= Kenneth MacMillan =

British ballet dancer and choreographer (1929–1992)

MacMillan towards the end of his life

Sir Kenneth MacMillan (11 December 1929 – 29 October 1992) was a British ballet dancer and choreographer who was artistic director of the Royal Ballet in London between 1970 and 1977, and its principal choreographer from 1977 until his death. Earlier he had served as director of ballet for the Deutsche Oper in Berlin. He was also associate director of the American Ballet Theatre from 1984 to 1989, and artistic associate of the Houston Ballet from 1989 to 1992.

From a family with no background of dance or music, MacMillan was determined from an early age to become a dancer. The director of Sadler's Wells Ballet, Ninette de Valois, accepted him as a student and then a member of her company. In the late 1940s, MacMillan built a successful career as a dancer, but, plagued by stage fright, he abandoned it while still in his twenties. After this he worked entirely as a choreographer; he created ten full-length ballets and more than fifty one-act pieces. In addition to his work for ballet companies he was active in television, musicals, non-musical drama, and opera.

Although he is mainly associated with the Royal Ballet, MacMillan frequently considered himself an outsider there and felt driven to work with other companies throughout his career as choreographer. His creations for the Stuttgart Ballet and the Deutsche Opera ballet include some of his most frequently revived works.

== Life and career ==
=== Early years ===
MacMillan was born in Dunfermline, Scotland, the youngest of four surviving children (Note: A fifth died in infancy.) of William MacMillan (1891–1946), who was a labourer and, from time to time, cook, and his wife, Edith (née Shreeve; 1888–1942).

His father had served in the army in the First World War, and suffered permanent physical and mental damage. In search of work he moved with his family to his wife's home town, Great Yarmouth in Norfolk. After attending a local primary school, Kenneth studied from 1940 at Great Yarmouth Grammar School, to which he won a scholarship. As Great Yarmouth was a target for German air raids in the Second World War, the school was evacuated to Retford in Nottinghamshire.

In Retford, MacMillan was introduced to ballet by a local dance teacher, Jean Thomas. He had already had lessons in Scottish dancing in Dunfermline and tap dancing in Great Yarmouth, and he took to ballet immediately. In 1942, his mother died, which caused him acute and lasting distress. His father was a distant figure, and the boy's only close family relationship was with an elder sister. His obituarist in The Times suggests that the feeling of being an outsider, displayed in many of MacMillan's ballets, had its roots in his childhood.

When the grammar school returned to Great Yarmouth in 1944, MacMillan found a new ballet teacher, Phyllis Adams. With her help, MacMillan, aged fifteen, secured admission to the Sadler's Wells Ballet School (later the Royal Ballet School). He saw his first performances of ballets, given by Ninette de Valois' Sadler's Wells company, at the New Theatre in London.

=== Dancer ===
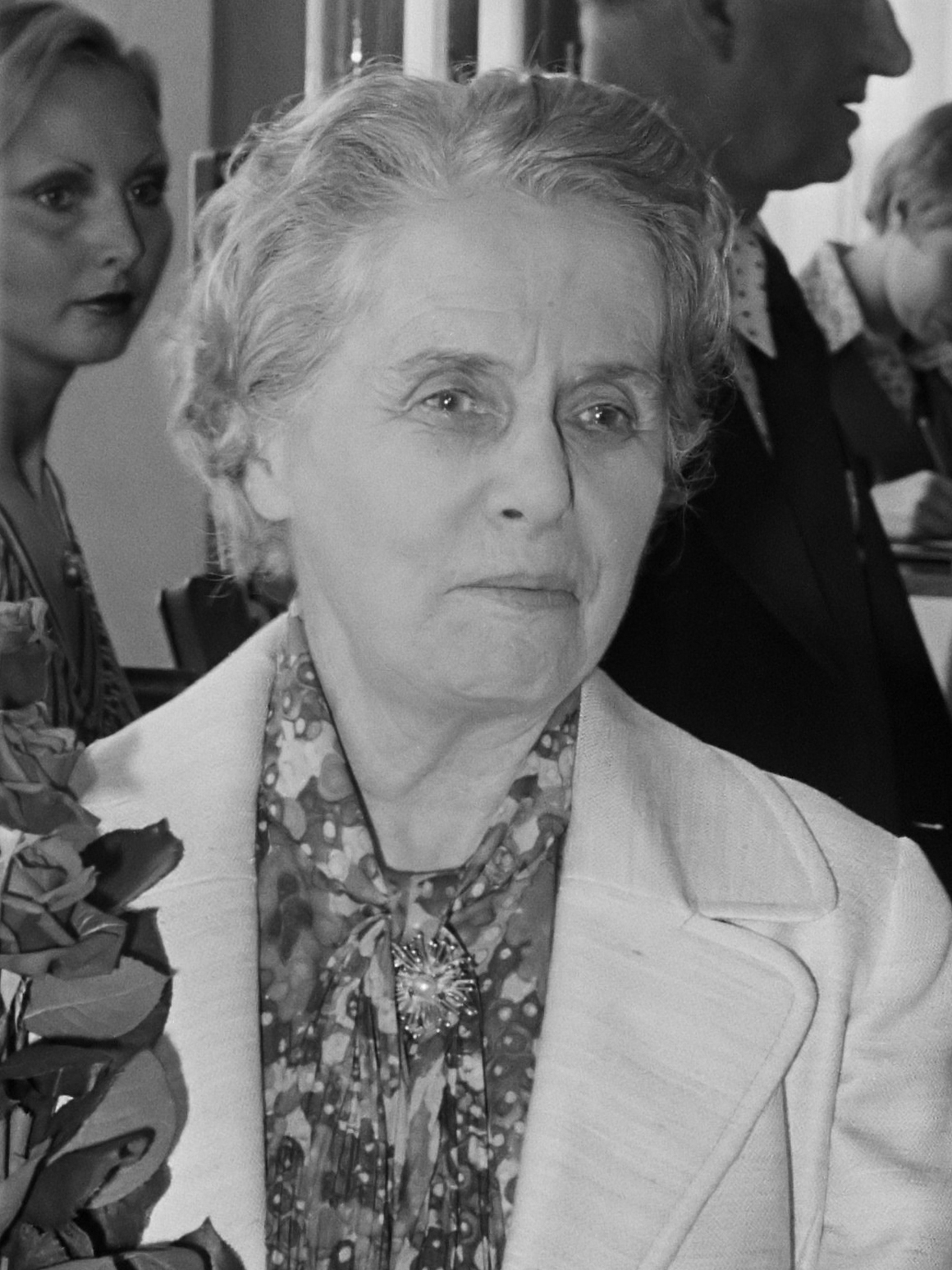
Ninette de Valois, who recruited and encouraged the young MacMillan

When David Webster was appointed chief executive of the Royal Opera House, Covent Garden at the end of the war, (Note: Webster's official title was General Administrator.) his assignment was to establish permanent opera and ballet companies for the house. He set about building the opera company from scratch but persuaded de Valois to make Covent Garden the main base for her ballet company. In 1946, while still a student, MacMillan appeared in the production of The Sleeping Beauty with which Webster and de Valois reopened the opera house. At first he was a non-dancing extra, and later he was promoted to a small dancing role. With the main company now resident at Covent Garden, de Valois established a smaller ensemble to perform at Sadler's Wells and act as a training ground for young dancers and choreographers. In April 1946 MacMillan was a founder member, and quickly made progress. He was cast by Frederick Ashton, de Valois' principal choreographer, in a leading role in a new ballet, Valses nobles et sentimentales, in October 1946. The success of the piece encouraged Ashton to revive his 1933 Les Rendezvous.

Although initially only in the corps de ballet for this work, MacMillan was unexpectedly promoted to the male lead because of injuries to all the eligible company principals. His biographer Jann Parry comments that he was able to take over without notice because he had a rare ability to remember and reproduce the steps of every dancer in any piece in which he appeared. He was promoted to the senior Covent Garden company at the start of the 1948–49 season, touring in Europe and dancing Florestan in the third act pas de trois of The Sleeping Beauty in the company's opening gala in New York in October 1949. The first new role he created was The Great Admirer of Mademoiselle Piquant in John Cranko's ballet Children's Corner (1948). He appeared in the British film Tread Softly, in 1950. Then followed his Sherlock Holmes and Professor Moriarty in Margaret Dale's The Great Detective (1953); and Moondog, in Cranko's The Lady and the Fool, (1954)

"I stopped dancing when I was about 23 mainly because I had just terrible stage fright and I hated performing. I turned to choreography as a release from dancing and I was lucky enough that the first thing I did everyone liked."

— MacMillan interviewed by the BBC in 1990

Despite his rise within the company, MacMillan became unhappy as a performer. He suffered from severe stage fright, and his leading roles became an ordeal for him. (Note: Parry comments that the only role MacMillan enjoyed performing in this period was as half of the comic drag duo of the Ugly Step-sisters in Ashton's Cinderella; there, MacMillan felt less exposed under the grotesque makeup and costume.) De Valois gave him three months' leave of absence, during which he spent some time dancing with his friend John Cranko's small group in the little Kenton Theatre, away from the spotlight, in Henley-on-Thames. Cranko, himself a former dancer who had moved to choreography, concluded that MacMillan might well follow the same course. When MacMillan returned to work, his confidence as a dancer somewhat restored, he took part in de Valois' new Choreographers Group, set up in response to Marie Rambert's "Ballet Workshops". (Note: Unknown to de Valois, MacMillan had already attended some of the rival sessions under Rambert's auspices.) For this group, MacMillan choreographed his first ballet, Somnambulism, which was first given on 1 February 1953. It was well received, and the next year he followed with another small-scale work, Laiderette. This introduced the "outsider" character that became a hallmark of his ballets, in this case a female clown who attends a ball at which her host falls in love with her until she loses the mask that has made her attractive. MacMillan's eclectic choice of music was evidenced in these two early works; the first was danced to jazz composed by Stan Kenton, and the second was to the harpsichord music of Frank Martin.

On the strength of the workshop successes, de Valois commissioned the 25-year-old MacMillan to create a ballet for performance at Sadler's Wells. Danses concertantes, to music by Stravinsky, was first produced in January 1955, with designs by Nicholas Georgiadis, with whom MacMillan collaborated extensively over the next years. Parry counts among MacMillan's early influences the modernism of choreographers such as Roland Petit, Jerome Robbins and Antony Tudor, and the craftsmanship of Ashton, from whom MacMillan said he learned how a ballet was made. The Times commented that with this piece it was clear that a powerful choreographic talent had arrived. The critic Clement Crisp has described the piece as "a bravura display using a witty, allusive classical vocabulary, remade by a creator who knew the cinema and spoke the movement language of his generation". With the success of Danses concertantes MacMillan concluded that his future lay in choreography rather than dancing. After a fierce argument with de Valois, who wanted him to continue in both capacities, he got his way, and from 1955 his contract with the company (on a slightly reduced salary) was purely as a choreographer. His only Covent Garden appearances as a dancer after that were two performances as an Ugly Step-sister in Cinderella alongside Ashton in 1956.

=== Choreographer ===
MacMillan next produced a series of one-act ballets. For the junior company he choreographed House of Birds (1955), based on the Grimm brothers' Jorinde and Joringel, and for Covent Garden he created Noctambules (1956) about a Svengali-like hypnotist. He also worked in television, with Punch and the Child (1954), The Dreamers, a television adaptation of Sonambulism, and Turned Out Proud (1955). In 1956 he took leave of absence to spend five months in New York, working with American Ballet Theatre, choreographing Winter's Eve and Journey for the dramatic ballerina Nora Kaye. For the Covent Garden opera company he staged the Venusberg ballet in Tannhäuser, regarded by some critics as the best part of a disappointing production.

MacMillan was the first of his generation of choreographers to have an entire evening of his works presented by the Sadler's Wells Ballet. In June 1956 his new "divertissement ballet" Solitaire was given in a quadruple bill with Somnambulism, House of Birds and Danses concertantes. His 1958 work, The Burrow, with its menacing echoes of war, oppression and concealment, won praise for venturing into territory seldom explored in ballet. The critic in The Times admitted that its dramatic impact was strong enough "to make one glad when it ends". The work marked the beginning of MacMillan's association with Lynn Seymour, who was his muse for many subsequent ballets. The company had by now been granted a royal charter and was known as the Royal Ballet, with the smaller company based at Sadler's Wells called the Royal Ballet Touring Company.

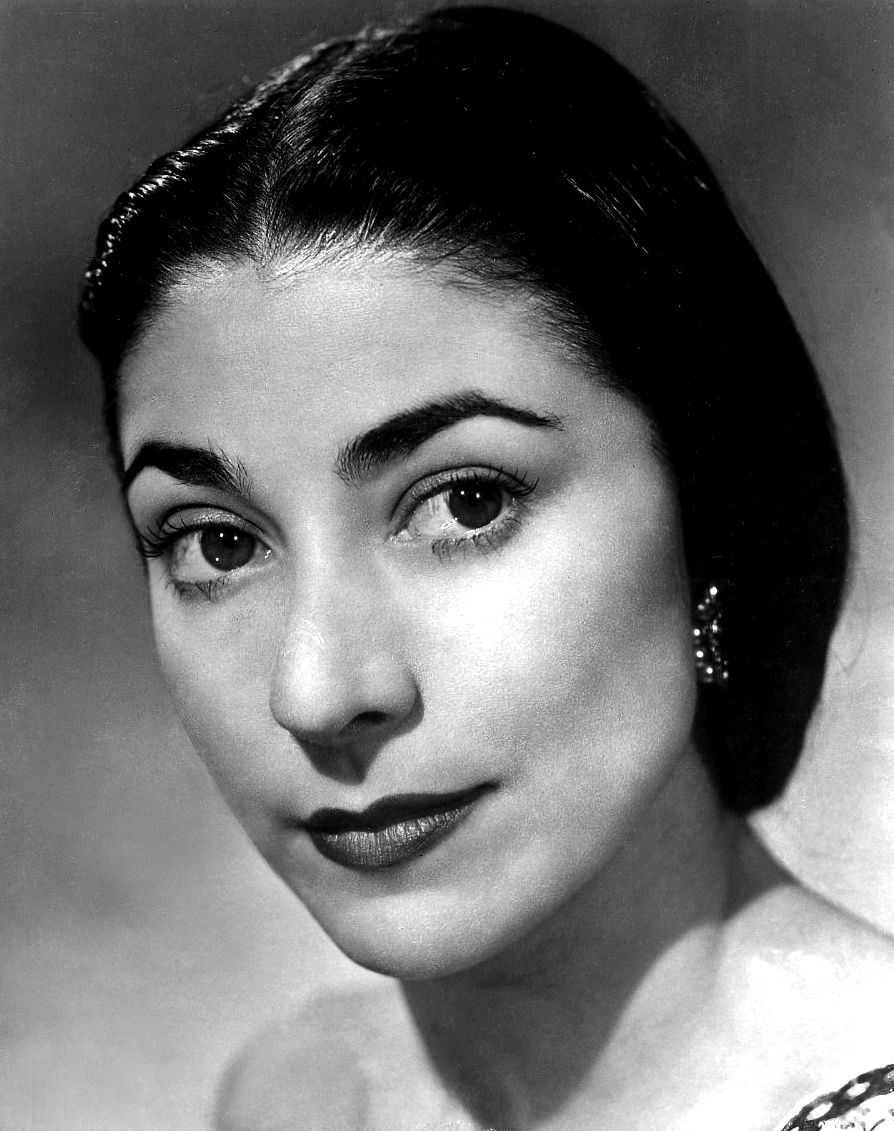
Margot Fonteyn, whose casting as Juliet dismayed MacMillan despite public acclaim

In the late 1950s MacMillan choreographed two musicals: one for the stage (The World of Paul Slickey, 1958) and one for the cinema (Expresso Bongo, 1959). The Invitation, first shown at the Royal Opera House on 30 December 1960, is probably MacMillan's most controversial ballet. This one-act work about rape was interpreted by Lynn Seymour and Desmond Doyle and provoked, at the time, mixed reactions in the press and the audience. Among MacMillan's works for the Royal Ballet in the early 1960s was The Rite of Spring (1962); he selected an unknown junior dancer, Monica Mason, to dance the lead role of the chosen maiden who dances herself to death in a primitive ritual. Dance and Dancers described it as "a singular and signal triumph"; Mason's performance was judged "brilliantly done ... one of British ballet's most memorable performances". In The Times John Percival commented that ever since Nijinsky's original attempt in 1913 The Rite had been waiting for a choreographer who could make it work on stage, and MacMillan's was the most successful version to date.

In the mid-1960s two of his ballets, though both immensely successful, strained relations between MacMillan and the Royal Opera House management. In 1964 Webster and the Covent Garden board turned down MacMillan's proposal to create a ballet using the music of Mahler's Das Lied von der Erde The Song of the Earth; the decision was made on the grounds that the score was unsuitable for use as a ballet. (Note: This was the second time the board had vetoed the proposal: MacMillan had been refused in 1959, despite support from de Valois.) Cranko, by now in charge of the Stuttgart Ballet, invited MacMillan to create the work there in 1965. It was a huge success, and within six months the Royal Ballet had taken the piece up. MacMillan's first full-length, three-act ballet, Romeo and Juliet (1965), to Prokofiev's score, was choreographed for Seymour and Christopher Gable, but at Webster's insistence the gala premiere was danced by Margot Fonteyn and Rudolf Nureyev. The decision was made for commercial rather than artistic reasons: Fonteyn and Nureyev were internationally known stars and guaranteed a full house at premium prices, as well as huge publicity. In Parry's words, MacMillan and his two chosen dancers felt betrayed.

=== Berlin, 1966–69 ===
Disillusioned with Covent Garden, MacMillan accepted an invitation from the Deutsche Oper in Berlin to run its ballet company. Parry describes this as an unhappy experience. Though at Covent Garden Webster may sometimes have been suspected of favouring the opera at the expense of the ballet, MacMillan discovered that at the Berlin house there was no doubt that the ballet was given distinctly lower priority. He did not speak German, which reduced his enjoyment from watching films (of which he was a great devotee) and theatre and limited him generally in everyday life. Although he had taken several colleagues with him, including Seymour, many moved away over the course of his nearly four years in charge, and MacMillan became increasingly isolated. It was the first time he had been in a managerial as well as a creative role, and the strain affected his physical and mental health. He smoked and drank heavily and suffered a minor stroke.

For the Berlin company, MacMillan created seven ballets: Valses nobles et sentimentales, Concerto, Anastasia (one act version), The Sleeping Beauty, Olympiad, Cain and Abel and Swan Lake. The critic Jane Simpson considers that some of MacMillan's finest work was done for Berlin and Stuttgart.

=== Royal Ballet: director 1970–77 ===
In 1970 Ashton, who had been artistic director of the Royal Ballet since de Valois stepped down in 1963, retired, somewhat reluctantly. Webster retired in the same year and wanted a wholesale change of management to coincide with his own departure. For the opera he arranged the joint directorship of Colin Davis and Peter Hall, and for the ballet he secured MacMillan and John Field as co-directors. Neither of the joint directorships succeeded. Hall did not take up his post, instead moving to run the National Theatre, and Field, who had run the junior Royal Ballet company under de Valois and Ashton, found the split directorship untenable and left within months to become director of ballet at La Scala, Milan.

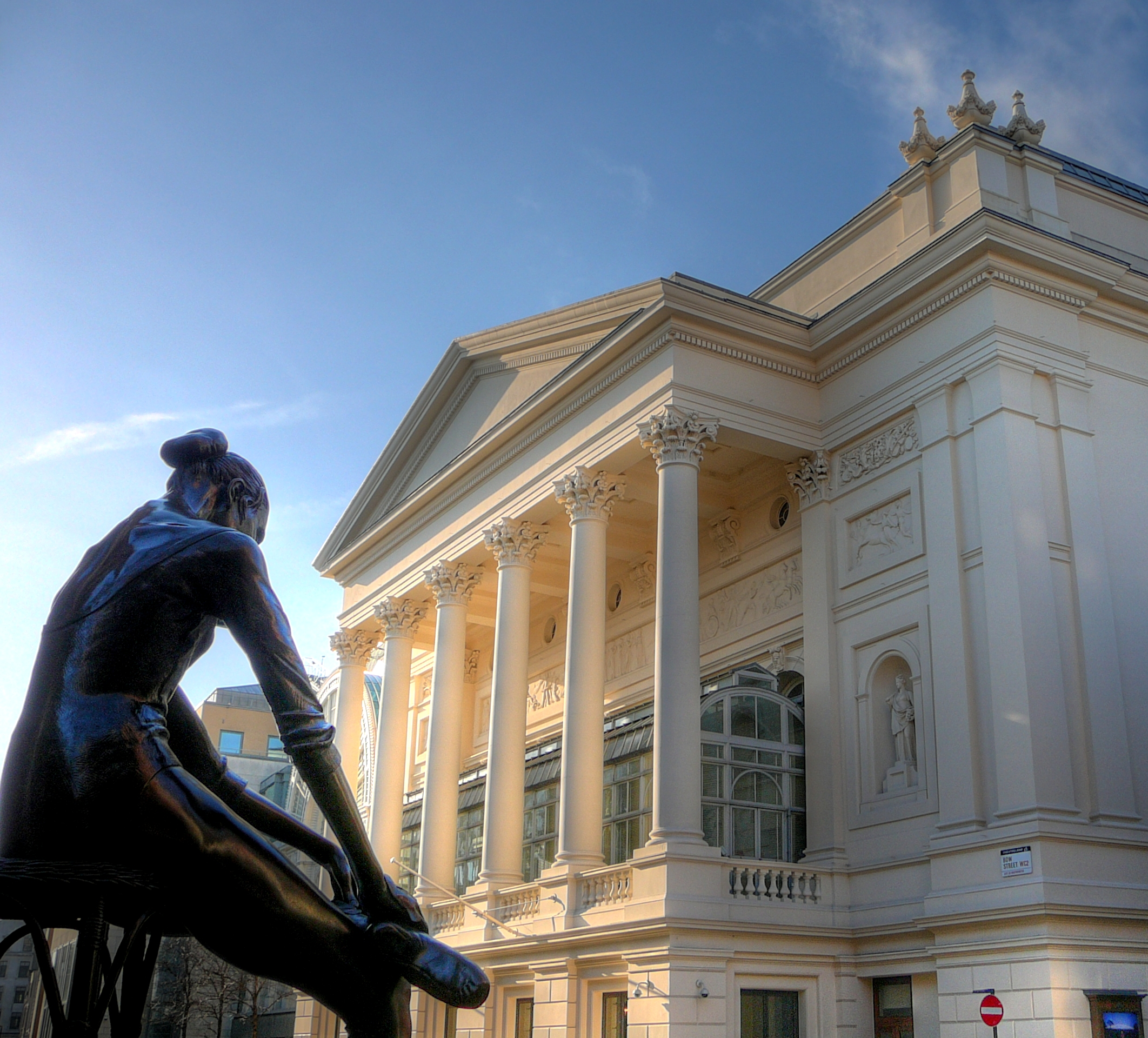
The Royal Opera House, with statue of Katie Pianoff.

MacMillan was in an awkward position. It was widely known that Ashton had been forced out, and many resented it. Company morale was lowered by an announcement, to which MacMillan and Field were party, that the two ballet companies would merge, with numerous job losses. The managerial side of the post was no more congenial to MacMillan than it had been in Berlin, and some felt that his creative work suffered during his seven-year term. His expansion of Anastasia into a three-act version (1971) and the other full-length work from this period, Manon (1974), divided opinion, receiving fiercely adverse reviews as well as laudatory ones. His Joplin ballet Elite Syncopations (1974) and Requiem (1976) were immediately successful and have been regularly revived. The latter was dedicated to the memory of Cranko, who had died suddenly in 1973. It was premiered at Stuttgart, because as with Song of the Earth the Royal Opera House board thought the chosen music – Fauré's Requiem – inappropriate for a ballet. The work was not given at Covent Garden until 1983.

At the age of 42 MacMillan, hitherto unmarried and enigmatic about his personal life, married the 26-year-old Australian painter Deborah Williams. The writer John Percival comments that MacMillan's marriage "saved him, both physically and mentally [and] gave him stability in his private life and seems to have resolved his confused sexuality". There was one daughter of the marriage.

=== Royal Ballet: principal choreographer 1977–92 ===
After seven years as director of the Royal Ballet, MacMillan resigned in 1977, wishing to concentrate on choreography. He was succeeded as artistic director by Norman Morrice, whose background was the more avant garde Ballet Rambert. MacMillan took up the post of principal choreographer. His fourth full-length ballet, Mayerling (1978), was a dark work, portraying the suicides of the Austrian Crown Prince Rudolf and his young mistress. Parry comments that some scenarios for his new one-act ballets featured similarly dark themes: "a disturbed family in My Brother, My Sisters, a lunatic asylum in Playground; Valley of Shadows ... included scenes in a Nazi concentration camp." Different Drummer (1984) was a balletic version of Georg Büchner's Woyzeck, familiar to Covent Garden audiences from Berg's 1925 opera Wozzeck: all three depict the brutal fate of the downtrodden. Even the lighter of MacMillan's ballets could have their serious side: La fin du jour (1979), to Ravel's Piano Concerto in G, depicts a way of life of the 1930s soon to be shattered by the Second World War, and is described by Crisp as "a requiem for the douceur de vivre of an era".

In the 1980s MacMillan ventured into non-balletic theatre, directing productions of Strindberg's The Dance of Death (Royal Exchange Theatre, Manchester, 1983) and Tennessee Williams's Kingdom of Earth (Hampstead Theatre, 1984). Parry, writing in The Observer, thought that the drama in the first play failed to spring fully to life; Michael Billington of The Guardian praised MacMillan's "immensely detailed, atmospheric production" of the second piece. From 1984 to 1989, while remaining chief choreographer of the Royal Ballet, MacMillan was associate director of the American Ballet Theatre. For that company he staged new works, Wild Boy and Requiem (this time to Andrew Lloyd Webber's music rather than Fauré's), restaged his Romeo and Juliet, and created a new production of The Sleeping Beauty.

Despite a serious heart attack in 1988 MacMillan continued to work intensely. In 1989 he made his first new ballet for Covent Garden for five years, a new version of Britten's The Prince of the Pagodas. The company had never found the original 1956 Cranko version satisfactory, and it was neglected during the composer's lifetime. MacMillan thought the piece could be successfully reworked with some cuts to the score, but the Britten estate refused to allow any alterations. MacMillan reverted to classical ballet for the piece, creating a fairy-tale work far from his accustomed style. The result was not judged among his best works, but it marked the emergence of the 19-year-old Darcey Bussell, whom he picked to dance the young heroine. Along with the former Bolshoi principal dancer Irek Mukhamedov, who joined the Royal Ballet in 1991, Bussell was MacMillan's final important muse. For the two of them he created Winter Dreams (1991), inspired by Chekhov's Three Sisters. Mukhamedov was the brutish male leading character in MacMillan's last ballet, The Judas Tree (1992).

MacMillan's Houston Ballet connection began under Artistic Director Ben Stevenson, an old friend from their Sadler's Wells days, who brought him on as Artistic Associate in 1989. In just three years, MacMillan enriched the repertoire with Song of the Earth, Gloria, Elite Syncopations, and Solitaire. He was preparing to stage Manon L'histoire_de_Manon in Houston before his death in 1992. Manon premiered on stage posthumously in 1994, and Mayerling followed in 2017, cementing his lasting legacy at Houston Ballet.

MacMillan died from a heart attack backstage at the Royal Opera House during a performance of Mayerling. Jeremy Isaacs, the general director of the Royal Opera House, announced the death from the stage after the performance and asked the audience to rise and bow their heads and leave the theatre in silence. On the same night the junior company was presenting MacMillan's Romeo and Juliet in Birmingham. MacMillan had nearly finished work on the dances for a new production of Carousel by the National Theatre, which opened at the Lyttelton Theatre six weeks later, with his family and many of his friends in the audience.

== Honours and awards ==
MacMillan was knighted in 1983, and he received honorary degrees from the University of Edinburgh (1976) and the Royal College of Art (1992). His awards include the Evening Standard Ballet Award (1979); Society of West End Theatre Managers Ballet Award, 1980 and 1983; and, posthumously, the Laurence Olivier Award for Best New Dance Production in 1993 for The Judas Tree; the Society of London Theatre Special Award in 1993; and the Tony Award for Best Choreography in 1994 for Carousel.

== Choreography ==
=== Full-length ballets ===
Title	Year	Company	Composer asterisk denotes specially-written works	Principal performers	Designer	Notes
Romeo and Juliet	1965	Royal Ballet	Prokofiev	Rudolf Nureyev, Margot Fonteyn, David Blair, Desmond Doyle, Anthony Dowell, Derek Rencher, Michael Somes	Nicholas Georgiadis	Made on Lynn Seymour and Christopher Gable, but the premiere was danced by Fonteyn and Nureyev
The Sleeping Beauty	1967	Deutsche Oper Ballet	Tchaikovsky	Lynn Seymour, Rudolf Holz, Vergie Derman, Hannelore Peters, Marion Cito,	Barry Kay	Production after Marius Petipa
Swan Lake	1969	Deutsche Oper Ballet	Tchaikovsky	Lynn Seymour, Frank Frey, Gerhard Bohner	Nicholas Georgiadis	Production after Marius Petipa and Lev Ivanov
Anastasia	1971	Royal Ballet	Tchaikovsky, Symphonies No 1 and No 3; Martinů, Fantaisies symphoniques; and Electronic music by Fritz Winckel and Rüdiger Rüfer	Lynn Seymour, Svetlana Beriosova, Antoinette Sibley, Derek Rencher, Anthony Dowell, Gerd Larsen, Vergie Derman, Jennifer Penney, Lesley Collier, David Wall	Barry Kay	Expanded version of one-act ballet of the same name (1967) – see below
The Sleeping Beauty	1973	Royal Ballet	Tchaikovsky	Antoinette Sibley, Anthony Dowell, Leslie Edwards, Gerd Larsen, Deanne Bergsma, Jennifer Penney	Peter Farmer	Production after Marius Petipa
Manon	1974	Royal Ballet	Massenet, music from various operas, arranged by Leighton Lewis	Antoinette Sibley, Anthony Dowell, David Wall, Monica Mason, Derek Rencher, David Drew	Nicholas Georgiadis	
Mayerling	1978	Royal Ballet	Liszt, orchestral and piano works, arr John Lanchbery	David Wall, Lynn Seymour, Merle Park, Georgina Parkinson, Michael Somes	Nicholas Georgiadis	
Isadora	1981	Royal Ballet	Richard Rodney Bennett*	Merle Park, Derek Deane, Julian Hosking, Derek Rencher	Barry Kay	Mary Miller, acting, non-dancing role
The Sleeping Beauty	1987	American Ballet Theatre	Tchaikovsky	Susan Jaffe, Robert Hill, Leslie Browne, Victor Barbee, Marianna Tcherkassky, Johan Renvall	Nicholas Georgiadis	Production after Marius Petipa
The Prince of the Pagodas	1989	Royal Ballet	Britten	Darcey Bussell, Jonathan Cope, Tetsuya Kumakawa, Fiona Chadwick, Anthony Dowell	Nicholas Georgiadis	

=== Shorter works ===
Title	Year	Company	Composer asterisk denotes specially-written works	Principal performers	Designer	Notes
Somnambulism	1953	Choreographers Group	Stan Kenton, arr John Lanchbery	Maryon Lane, David Poole, Kenneth MacMillan		MacMillan danced in this at short notice.
Fragment	1953	Choreographers Group	Stan Kenton	Sara Neil, Donald Britton, Annette Page		
Punch and the Child	1954	BBC Television	Richard Arnell, Punch and the Child	Kenneth MacMillan, Susan Handy		
Laiderette	1954	Choreographers Group	Frank Martin, Petite symphonie concertante	Maryon Lane, David Poole, Johaar Mosavaal		
Steps into Ballet	1954	BBC Television	Richard Arnell	Peggy van Praagh, Maureen Bruce, Donald Britton, Susan Solomon, Kenneth MacMillan	Michael Yates	
Danses concertantes	1955	Sadler's Wells Theatre Ballet	Stravinsky, Danses concertantes	Maryon Lane, Donald Britton, David Poole, Sara Neil, Gilbert Vernon, Annette Page, Donald MacLeary, Bryan Lawrence	Nicholas Georgiadis	MacMillan's first collaboration with Georgiadis
House of Birds	1955	Sadler's Wells Theatre Ballet	Mompou, Variations on a Theme of Chopin	Maryon Lane, David Poole, Doreen Tempest	Nicholas Georgiadis	
Turned Out Proud	1955	BBC Television	Englund, Sibelius, Françaix and others	Violette Verdy, Annette Chappell, Sonia Hana, Sheila O’Neil, Gilbert Vernon		
Tannhäuser: Venusberg Ballet	1955	Covent Garden Opera Ballet	Wagner	Julia Farron, Gilbert Vernon	Ralph Koltai	
Noctambules	1956	Sadler's Wells Ballet	Humphrey Searle, Noctambules*	Leslie Edwards, Maryon Lane, Nadia Nerina, Desmond Doyle, Brian Shaw	Nicholas Georgiadis	
Solitaire	1956	Sadler's Wells Theatre Ballet	Malcolm Arnold, English Dances; Sarabande* and Polka*	Margaret Hill, Sara Neil, Donald Britton, Michael Boulton, Donald MacLeary	Desmond Heeley	
Fireworks pas de deux	1956	Ballet Highlights	Stravinsky, Feu d'artifice	Nadia Nerina, Alexis Rassine		Commissioned by Nerina and Rassine for a touring ballet show
Valse eccentrique	1956	Sadler's Wells Theatre Ballet	Ibert, Valse from Divertissement	Anya Linden, Brian Shaw, Alexander Grant		Single performance only, at a gala evening; described by The Times as "a burlesque pas de trois on an old-fashioned aquatic scene … new and comic, though insubstantial
Winter's Eve	1957	American Ballet Theatre	Britten, Variations on a Theme of Frank Bridge	Nora Kaye, John Kriza	Nicholas Georgiadis	
Journey	1957	American Ballet Theatre, Choreographic Group	Bartók, Music for Strings, Percussion and Celeste, arr Joseph Levine	Nora Kaye, John Kriza, Erik Bruhn, Scott Douglas		
The Burrow	1958	Royal Ballet Touring Company	Frank Martin, Concerto for seven wind instruments, kettledrums and strings	Anne Heaton, Donald Britton, Lynn Seymour, Donald MacLeary, Edward Miller, Noreen Sopwith	Nicholas Georgiadis	MacMillan's first work made on Lynn Seymour
Agon	1958	Royal Ballet	Stravinsky, Agon	David Blair, Anya Linden, Pirmin Trecu, Shirley Graham, Annette Page, Maryon Lane, Graham Usher, John Stevens, Deidre Dixon, Ronald Hynd, Judith Sinclair, Georgina Parkinson, Antoinette Sibley, Doreen Wells	Nicholas Georgiadis	
The World of Paul Slickey	1959	Palace Theatre	Christopher Whelen*	Adrienne Corri and cast	Hugh Casson (sets); Jocelyn Rickards (costumes)	West End show
Expresso Bongo	1959	Val Guest Productions	Robert Farnon*	Laurence Harvey, Sylvia Syms, Yolande Donlan, Cliff Richard		Cinema film loosely based on West End show
Le Baiser de la fée	1960	Royal Ballet	Stravinsky, Le Baiser de la fée	Svetlana Beriosova, Meriel Evans, Donald MacLeary, Lynn Seymour, Jacqueline Daryl	Kenneth Rowell	
The Invitation	1960	Royal Ballet Touring Company	Mátyás Seiber*	Lynn Seymour, Christopher Gable, Shirley Bishop, Barbara Remington, Sheila Humphrey, Anne Heaton, Desmond Doyle	Nicholas Georgiadis	
Orpheus	1961	Royal Opera Ballet	Gluck	Anne Heaton, Alexander Bennett		Dances for revival of Gluck's opera Orfeo ed Euridice
The Seven Deadly Sins	1961	Western Theatre Ballet	Weill, The Seven Deadly Sins	Anya Linden	Ian Spurling	Ballet chanté – lyrics by Berthold Brecht, translated by W H Auden. Singer, Cleo Laine
Diversions	1961	Royal Ballet	Bliss, Music for Strings	Svetlana Beriosova, Donald MacLeary, Maryon Lane, Graham Usher	Philip Prowse	
The Rite of Spring	1962	Royal Ballet	Stravinsky, The Rite of Spring	Monica Mason	Sidney Nolan	
Dance Suite	1962	Royal Ballet School	Milhaud, Suite Provençale	Vergie Derman, Richard Cragun		
Fantasia in C minor	1962	–	Bach, Fantasia in C minor	Rudolf Nureyev		Single performance, for Royal Academy of Dancing gala at Drury Lane
Symphony	1963	Royal Ballet	Shostakovich, Symphony No 1	Antoinette Sibley, Donald MacLeary, Georgina Parkinson, Desmond Doyle	Yolanda Sonnabend	MacMillan's first collaboration with Sonnabend
Las Hermanas	1963	Stuttgart Ballet	Frank Martin, Concerto for harpsichord and small orchestra	Marcia Haydée, Birgit Keil, Ray Barra¸ Ruth Papendick	Nicholas Georgiadis	Based on Lorca's The House of Bernarda Alba
Dark Descent	1963	ITV	Carlos Chavez, Milhaud	Marcia Haydée, Ray Barra	James Goddard	Version of the Orpheus myth, made for television
La Création du monde	1964	Royal Ballet Touring Ballet	Milhaud, La Création du Monde	Doreen Wells, Richard Farley, Elizabeth Anderton, Adrian Grater, Ronald Emblen	James Goddard	
Divertimento	1964	Bath Festival	Bartók, Sonata for Solo Violin	Margot Fonteyn, Rudolf Nureyev		Solo violin, Yehudi Menuhin, for whom Bartók wrote the work
Images of Love	1964	Royal Ballet Touring Company	Peter Tranchell*	Svetlana Beriosova, Lynn Seymour, Donald MacLeary, Rudolf Nureyev	Barry Kay	
Song of the Earth	1965	Stuttgart Ballet	Mahler, Das Lied von der Erde	Marcia Haydée, Ray Barra, Egon Madsen, Ana Cardus	Nicholas Georgiadis for the London premiere in 1966, no designer mentioned at Stuttgart	Margarethe Bence (mezzo-soprano), James Harper (tenor)
Albertine, or The Crimson Curtain	1966	BBC Television	not known	Lynn Seymour, Desmond Doyle		
Valses nobles et sentimentales	1966	Deutsche Oper Ballet	Ravel, Valses nobles et sentimentales	Didi Carli, Falco Kapuste, Vergie Derman, Silvia Kesselheim, Gert Schulze, Gerhard Bohner	Jürgen Rose	
Concerto	1966	Deutsche Oper Ballet	Shostakovich, Piano Concerto No 2	Didi Carli, Falco Kapuste, Lynn Seymour, Rudolf Holz, Silvia Kesselheim	Jürgen Rose	
Anastasia, one-act version	1967	Deutsche Oper Ballet	Martinů, Fantaisies symphoniques; and electronic music by Fritz Winckel and Rudiger Rufer*	Lynn Seymour, Rudolf Holz, Vergie Derman, Gerhard Bohner	Barry Kay	Later became Act III of full-length version
Olympiade	1968	Deutsche Oper Ballet	Stravinsky, Symphony in Three Movements	Lynn Seymour, Hennelore Peters, Klaus Beelitz, Rudolf Holz, Falco Kapuste		
The Sphinx/Der Sphinx	1968	Stuttgart Ballet	Milhaud, Five Small Symphonies	Marcia Haydée, Egon Madsen, Richard Cragun, Heinz Clauss	Elizabeth Dalton	
Cain and Abel/Kain und Abel	1968	Deutsche Oper Ballet	Panufnik, Sinfonia Sacra and Tragic Overture	Frank Frey, Daniel Job, Dorothea Binner, Rudolf Holz, Gerhard Bohner	Barry Kay	Music revised by the composer, with added material
Olympiad, reworking of Olympiade	1969	Royal Ballet	Stravinsky, Symphony in Three Movements	Deanne Bergsma, Keith Rosson, Robert Mead		
Miss Julie	1970	Stuttgart Ballet	Panufnik, Nocturne, Rhapsody, Autumn Music and Polonia	Marcia Haydée, Frank Frey, Birgit Keil	Barry Kay	Music revised by the composer, with added material
Checkpoint	1970	Royal Ballet New Group	Gerhard, Symphony No 3 (Collages)	Svetlana Beriosova, Donald MacLeary	Elizabeth Dalton	
Pas de sept	1971	Royal Ballet	Tchaikovsky, The Sleeping Beauty	Deanne Bergsma, Lesley Collier, Vergie Denman, Ann Jenner, Georgina Parkinson, Jennifer Penney, Diana Vere	Barry Kay	Adapted by MacMillan from his Deutsche Oper production of the full ballet
Triad	1972	Royal Ballet	Prokofiev, Violin Concerto No 1	Antoinette Sibley, Anthony Dowell, Wayne Eagling, David Ashmole, Peter O’Brien, Gary Sherwood	Peter Unsworth	Ralph Holmes, solo violin
Ballade	1972	Royal Ballet New Group	Fauré, Ballade for piano and orchestra	Vyvyan Lorrayne, Paul Clarke, Nicholas Johnson, Stephen Jefferies		
Side Show pas de deux	1972	Royal Ballet New Group	Stravinsky, Suites Nos 1 and 2 for small orchestra	Lynn Seymour, Rudolf Nureyev	Thomas O'Neil	
The Poltroon	1972	Royal Ballet New Group	Rudolf Maros, Studies for Orchestra and Musica di Ballo	Brenda Last, Stephen Jefferies, Donald MacLeary, David Gordon, Carl Myers, Graham Bart, Ashley Killar	Thomas O'Neil	
Pavane pas de deux	1973	Royal Ballet	Fauré, Pavane	Antoinette Sibley, Anthony Dowell	Anthony Dowell	
The Seven Deadly Sins	1973	Royal Ballet	Weill, The Seven Deadly Sins	Jennifer Penney	Ian Spurling	Georgia Brown, singer
Gala pas de deux	1974	Royal Ballet	Stravinsky, slow movement of Symphony in Three Movements	Natalia Makarova, Donald MacLeary		Gala to mark the retirement of Lord Drogheda as chairman of the ROH board
Elite Syncopations	1974	Royal Ballet	Scott Joplin, piano and orchestral rags, and pieces by Paul Pratt, James Scott, Joseph Lamb, Max Morath, Donald Ashwander and Robert Hampton	Merle Park, Donald MacLeary, Monica Mason, Michael Coleman, Jennifer Penney, David Wall, Vergie Derman, Wayne Sleep, Wayne Eagling, Jennifer Jackson, Judith How, David Drew, David Adams	Ian Spurling	
The Four Seasons	1975	Royal Ballet	Verdi, music from I vespri siciliani, I Lombardi and Don Carlo	Vergie Derman, Marguerite Porter, Donald MacLeary, Lesley Collier, Michael Coleman, David Ashmole, Wayne Eagling, Monica Mason, David Wall, Anthony Dowell, Jennifer Penney, Wayne Sleep	Peter Rice	
Rituals	1975	Royal Ballet	Bartók, Sonata for Two Pianos and Percussion	David Drew, Wayne Eagling, Stephen Beagley, Vergie Derman, David Wall, Lynn Seymour, Monica Mason, Graham Fletcher	Yolanda Sonnabend	
Requiem	1976	Stuttgart Ballet	Fauré Requiem	Marcia Haydée, Birgit Keil, Richard Cragun, Egon Madsen, Reid Anderson	Yolanda Sonnabend	In memory of John Cranko
Feux Follets solo	1976	Theatre of Skating	Liszt, Transcendental Study No 5	John Curry		created at MacMillan's suggestion for the ice-skater
Gloriana	1977	Royal Ballet	Britten, Dances from Gloriana	Lynn Seymour, Wayne Eagling, Michael Coleman, Stephen Beagley, Graham Fletcher	Yolanda Sonnabend	
My Brother, My Sisters	1978	Stuttgart Ballet	Schoenberg and Webern orchestral pieces	Birgit Keil, Richard Cragun, Lucia Montagnon, Reid Anderson, Jean Allenby, Sylviane Bayard, Hilde Koch	Yolanda Sonnabend	
6.6.78	1978	Sadler's Wells Royal Ballet	Barber, Capricorn Concerto	Marion Tait, Desmond Kelly	Ian Spurling	Homage to Dame Ninette de Valois
Métaboles	1978	Paris Opera Ballet	Dutilleux*	Dominique Khalfouni, Patrice Bart, Patrick Dupond	Barry Kay	
La Fin du jour	1979	Royal Ballet	Ravel, Piano Concerto in G major	Merle Park, Jennifer Penney, Julian Hosking, Wayne Eagling	Ian Spurling	piano soloist, Philip Gammon
Playground	1979	Sadler's Wells Royal Ballet	Gordon Crosse*	Marion Tait, Desmond Kelly, Stephen Wicks, Judith Rowann	Yolanda Sonnabend	
Gloria	1980	Royal Ballet	Poulenc, Gloria	Wayne Eagling, Julian Hosking, Jennifer Penney, Wendy Ellis	Andy Klunder	
Waterfalls pas de deux	1980	Charity gala	Paul McCartney, "Waterfalls"	Anthony Dowell, Jennifer Penney		
Wild Boy	1981	American Ballet Theatre	Gordon Crosse, Wildboy	Mikhail Baryshnikov, Natalia Makarova, Kevin MacKenzie, Robert La Fosse	Oliver Smith (costumes), Willa Kim (scenery)	
A Lot of Happiness	1981	Granada Television		Birgit Keil, Vladimir Klos	Deborah MacMillan	Documentary about the making of the ballet
Verdi Variations pas de deux	1982	Aterballetto	Verdi, String Quartet in E minor, first movement	Elisabetta Terabust, Peter Schaufuss		First part of Quartet
Quartet	1982	Sadler's Wells Royal Ballet	Verdi, String Quartet in E minor	Sherilyn Kennedy, David Ashmole, Galina Samsova, Desmond Kelly, Marion Tait, Carl Myers, Sandra Madgwick, Roland Price	Deborah MacMillan	Includes Verdi Variations pas de deux
Orpheus	1982	Royal Ballet	Stravinsky, Orpheus	Peter Schaufuss, Jennifer Penney, Wayne Eagling, Ashley Page, Derek Deane, Bryony Brind, Genesia Rosato, Michael Batchelor, Antony Dowson	Nicholas Georgiadis	
Valley of Shadows	1983	Royal Ballet	Martinů, Double Concerto; Tchaikovsky, Hamlet, Entr'acte and Elegy; Souvenir de Florence, 2nd movement	Alessandra Ferri, Sandra Conley, Julie Wood, Derek Deane, Guy Niblett, David Wall, Ashley Page	Yolanda Sonnabend	
Different Drummer	1984	Royal Ballet	Webern, Passacaglia for Orchestra, Op. 1; Schoenberg, Verklärte Nacht	Wayne Eagling, Alessandra Ferri, Stephen Jefferies, Guy Niblett, David Drew, Jonathan Burrows, Jonathan Cope, Antony Dowson, Ross MacGibbon, Bruce Sansom, Stephen Sheriff	Yolanda Sonnabend	
The Seven Deadly Sins of the Bourgeoisie	1984	Royal Ballet and Granada Television	Weill, The Seven Deadly Sins	Alessandra Ferri, Leslie Brown, David Taylor, Birgit Keil, Vladimir Klos, Peter Baldwin, Robert North, Christopher Bruce, April Olrich, Kim Rosato, Wayne Aspinall, Peter Salmon	Yolanda Sonnabend	Mary Miller (speaker), Marie Angel, Robin Leggate, Stephen Roberts, Robert Tear, John Tomlinson (singers)
Gala pas de deux	1984	Royal Ballet	Poulenc, Piano Concerto, slow movement	Alessandra Ferri	Deborah MacMillan	
Tannhäuser: Venusberg Ballet	1984	Royal Opera	Wagner		Yolanda Sonnabend	
Three Solos	1985	Contemporary Dance Trust	Bach, Rachmaninoff, Telemann	Christopher Bannerman, Linda Gibbs, Ross McKimn		
Requiem	1986	American Ballet Theatre	Andrew Lloyd Webber, Requiem	Alessandra Ferri, Gil Boggs, Cynthia Harvey, Susan Jaffe, Leslie Browne, Ross Stretton, Kevin McKenzie, Clark Tippet	Yolanda Sonnabend	
Le Baiser de la fée	1986	Royal Ballet	Stravinsky, Le Baiser de la fée	Fiona Chadwick, Sandra Conley, Jonathan Cope, Maria Almeida	Martin Sutherland	
Sea of Troubles	1988	Dance Advance	Webern and Martinů,	Michael Batchelor, Susan Crow, Jennifer Jackson, Sheila Styles, Russell Maliphant, Stephen Sheriff	Deborah MacMillan	
Soirées musicales	1988	Royal Ballet School	Rossini, arr Britten	Dana Fouras, Gary Shuker, Tetsuya Kumakawa, Benjamin Tyrrell	Ian Spurling	
Farewell pas de deux	1990	Royal Ballet	Tchaikovsky, Romance in F major	Darcey Bussell, Irek Mukhamedov		
Gala pas de deux	1990	Royal Ballet	Richard Rodgers	Darcey Bussell, Stuart Cassidy		
Winter Dreams	1991	Royal Ballet	Tchaikovsky, piano works; traditional Russian works (arr Philip Gammon)	Darcey Bussell, Nicola Tranah, Viviana Durante, Gary Avis, Genesia Rosato, Anthony Dowell, Irek Mukhamedov, Stephen Wicks, Adam Cooper, Derek Rencher, Gerd Larsen	Peter Farmer	based_on Anton Chekhov's "Three Sisters"
The Burrow	1991	Birmingham Royal Ballet	Frank Martin, Concerto for seven wind instruments, kettledrums and strings	Marion Tate, Desmond Kelly, Anina Landa	Nicholas Georgiadis	Restaging of 1958 work
Gala pas de deux	1991	Royal Ballet	Poulenc, Piano Concerto, slow movement	Leanne Benjamin, Stephen Jefferies		Reworking of 1984 gala pas de deux
The Judas Tree	1992	Royal Ballet	Brian Elias*	Irek Mukhamedov, Viviana Durante, Michael Nunn, Mark Silver, Luke Heydon	Jock McFadyen	
Carousel, posthumous	1992	National Theatre	Richard Rodgers, Carousel			

Sources: Royal Opera House performance database, Parry, and Kenneth MacMillan website.

== Notes, references and sources ==
=== Sources ===
- Haltrecht, Montague (1975). The Quiet Showman: Sir David Webster and the Royal Opera House. London: Collins. ISBN 978-0-00-211163-8.
- Parry, Jann (2009). Different Drummer: The Life of Kenneth MacMillan. London: Faber and Faber. ISBN 978-0-571-24302-0.
- Thorpe, Edward (1985). Kenneth MacMillan: The Man and the Ballets. London: Hamish Hamilton. ISBN 978-0-241-11694-4.
