= Jazz Calendar =

Jazz Calendar is a ballet created in 1968 by Frederick Ashton to the music of Richard Rodney Bennett. The ballet was first performed on 9 January 1968 by The Royal Ballet at the Royal Opera House, Covent Garden, with designs by Derek Jarman. The work was performed over 50 times up to 1979 by the Royal Ballet at Covent Garden but is not part of the current repertoire. It was also produced in October 1990 at the Birmingham Hippodrome by Birmingham Royal Ballet.

== History ==
The production was arranged at short notice to replace a new production of Aida, and at the suggestion of Nigel Gosling, Ashton asked Derek Jarman to create the designs.

Richard Rodney Bennett's score had been commissioned by the BBC and composed between 1962 and 1964. It encompasses a variety of traditional jazz forms and devices, from twelve-bar blues (in Friday's Child) to a fast jazz waltz (in Thursday's Child). Written "for 12 instruments", the scoring is flute, alto-, tenor-, and baritone saxophone, horn, two trumpets, bassoon, trombone, drums, piano, bass. The music is dedicated to the singer Jean Hart.

The rehearsals for the ballet's premiere were filmed at the Royal Opera House involving many of the original principals. The full score was recorded in 1971 by the London Jazz Ensemble conducted by John Lanchbery (Philips 6500 301).

=== Original cast ===
- Monday : Vergie Derman
- Tuesday : Merle Park, Anthony Dowell, Robert Mead
- Wednesday : Vyvyan Lorrayne, Paul Brown, David Drew, Ian Hamilton, Derek Rencher
- Thursday : Alexander Grant, six girls
- Friday : Antoinette Sibley, Rudolf Nureyev
- Saturday : Michael Coleman, Desmond Doyle, Lambert Cox, Frank Freeman, Jonathan Kelly, Keith Martin, Peter O'Brien, Wayne Sleep
- Sunday : Marilyn Trouson and cast.

== Story ==
The scenario, based on the children's poem Monday's Child follows the sequence of the poem. After Monday (a "hymn to narcissism"), Tuesday is a pas de trois in a style of Ashton's Monotones. Wednesday's woe is in the form of a "distortion of the Rose Adagio" from The Sleeping Beauty, Thursday depicts various forms of transport, Friday is a blues pas de deux. Saturday is a send-up of a male ballet class, while the finale mimicked the 'stage revolve' close of Sunday Night at the London Palladium.
