= Noctambules =

1956 ballet by Kenneth MacMillan and Humphrey Searle

- Choreographer: Kenneth MacMillan
- Music: Humphrey Searle
- Premiere: 1 March 1956; Royal Opera House, Covent Garden, London
- Original ballet company: Sadler's Wells Ballet
- Characters: The Hypnotist; His Assistant; The Faded Beauty; The Poor Girl; The Rich Man; The Soldier
- Genre: Neoclassical ballet
- Type: one act ballet

Noctambules is a ballet created in 1956 by Kenneth MacMillan for the Sadler's Wells Ballet. The ballet was choreographed to Humphrey Searle's Noctambules, Op. 30 written for the ballet. The set and costumes were designed by Nicholas Georgiadis. The ballet premiered on 1 March 1956 at the Royal Opera House, Covent Garden, London.

== Original cast ==
- The Hypnotist – Leslie Edwards
- His Assistant – Maryon Lane
- The Faded Beauty – Nadia Nerina
- The Poor Girl – Anya Linden
- The Rich Man – Desmond Doyle
- The Soldier – Brian Shaw

The corps de ballet was divided into "rich people" and "poor people". Notable dancers among the "rich" included Australian choreographer Ronald Hynd and South African dancer Gary Burne. Notable dancers among the "poor" included Merle Park, Doreen Wells and Pirmin Trecu.
