= The Rite of Spring (MacMillan) =

The Rite of Spring is a one-act ballet created by Kenneth MacMillan in 1962 for the Royal Ballet, set to Igor Stravinsky's The Rite of Spring (1913). The conductor was Colin Davis, and the designs were by Sidney Nolan.

The first performance was given at the Royal Opera House, Covent Garden on 3 May 1962. The central role of the Chosen One was danced by Monica Mason who continued to tale the part in revivals up to 1982. Mason supervised later revivals, in which the Chosen One was danced by, among others, Tamara Rojo (2005 and 2008), Mara Galeazzi (2005), Zenaida Yanowsky (2005), Steven McRae (2011) and Edward Watson (2011).

== Background ==
MacMillan had been invited to create a new production of The Rite of Spring for the Royal Ballet in 1959, but had declined. The company had little history of presenting Stravinsky ballets, with the exceptions of Ashton's Le baiser de la fée (1935) and Scènes de ballet (1948), and MacMillan's Dances concertantes (1955), Agon (1958) and Le baiser de la fée (1961). MacMillan took The Rite up in 1962, creating a work conspicuously removed from the Royal Ballet's classical tradition. His conception of the piece, supported by Sidney Nolan's designs, was what the commentator Stephanie Jordan calls "a generalized primitivism".

The scenario generally follows that of the original 1913 ballet, with minor changes such as the replacement of the Sage with three Elders, and bringing two key plot points forward in the action: the selection of the chosen one and the start of her sacrificial dance.

== Premiere ==
The premiere took place on Friday 3 May 1962 at Covent Garden. Notable audience members included Queen Elizabeth the Queen Mother and Princess Margaret.

=== Original cast ===
The Adolescents	Dorothea Zaymes	Margaret Lyons	Dudley Tomlinson
	Mavis Osborn	Virginia Wakelyn	Lawrence Ruffell
	Ann Howard	Susan Carlton	Keith Milland
	Jacqueline Haslam	Carla Attree	Keith Martin
	Maureen Maitland	Ann Jenner	David Morse
	Gloria Bluemel	Douglas Steuart	Michael Coleman
	Julie Wood	Austin Bennett	
The Men	Keith Rosson	Petrus Bosman	David Jones
	David Drew	Ronald Plaisted	Anthony Dowell
	Bryan Lawrence	Kenneth Mason	Lambert Cox
	Derek Rencher		
The Maidens	Deanne Bergsma	Pamela Moncur	Jane Robinson
	Vyvyan Lorrayne	Audrey Henderson	
The Women	Ann Kenward	Louanne Richards	Glynis Ellams
	Rosalind Eyre	Betty Kavanagh	Christine Anthony
	Heather Clipperton		
The Elders	Franklin White	Christopher Newton	Kenneth Barlow
The Chosen Maiden	Monica Mason		

Source: Royal Opera House archive.

=== Critical reception ===
Early reviews were mixed but generally positive; The Guardian concluded that the Royal Ballet had "made a brave musicianly and tasteful attempt" while questioning whether "the stage can really be its home – that remains unproven"; dance and dancers described it as "a singular and signal triumph"; Mason's performance was judged "brilliantly done", "one of British ballet's most memorable performances". In The Times John Percival commented that ever since Nijinsky's original attempt in 1913 The Rite had been waiting for a choreographer who could make it work on stage, and MacMillan's was the most successful version to date: "Mr MacMillan's invention can never have been more musical or assured. Time and time again Stravinsky's music, unaffectedly conducted by Mr Colin Davis, meets its match, as the choreography, with its blend of primitivism and modern jive, piles climax on climax."
