= Isadora (ballet) =

Isadora is a ballet created for the Royal Ballet by Kenneth MacMillan to music by Richard Rodney Bennett with a scenario by Gillian Freeman, based on the life and dance of Isadora Duncan.

In following the life of Isadora Duncan, the title role is taken jointly by a ballerina and by an actress, whose spoken text is drawn from sections of the memoirs of Duncan. Following the initial run at Covent Garden and performances New York, the ballet was not seen until revised in consultation with MacMillan's widow, and revived by the company in 2009. The scenario in the ballet concentrates on the dramatic events in Duncan's personal life and her relationships with four of her partners. Set in the United States, France, and Russia, events covered in the ballet include her relationships with Paris Singer and Edward Gordon Craig in the first two decades of the 20th century, and the tragic drowning of her three children fathered by those men in the River Seine in 1913, as well as her marriage to Sergei Yesenin in 1922-1923.

The first performance of Isadora was at the Royal Opera House, Covent Garden on 30 April 1981 with Merle Park in the title role. Designs were by Barry Kay.

The ballet was featured in the 50th anniversary BBC programme, 'Right Royal Company', in May 1981 and was filmed by Granada Television with the original cast and broadcast in 1982, subsequently being issued on DVD in 2011 by Odeon Entertainment, as the accompaniment to the 1968 feature film Isadora.

== Original cast ==
- Merle Park – Isadora (dancing)
- Mary Miller – Isadora Duncan (acting role)
- Derek Deane – Oskar Beregi
- Julian Hosking – Edward Gordon Craig
- Derek Rencher – Paris Singer
- Monica Mason – Nursey
- Graham Fletcher – A Sailor
- Laura Connor – Loie Fuller
- Ashley Page – Tango Boy
- Garry Grant – André Caplet
- David Drew – Max Merz
- Ross MacGibbon – Man on the Beach
- Stephen Jefferies – Sergei Esenin

The original score by Bennett was conducted by Barry Wordsworth.

== See also ==
- List of historical ballet characters
