= Gloria (ballet) =

Gloria is a ballet created by Kenneth MacMillan in 1980 for the Royal Ballet, London. The music is Francis Poulenc's Gloria for soprano, chorus and orchestra (1961).

The first performance was at the Royal Opera House, Covent Garden on 13 March 1980. The lead roles were danced by Wayne Eagling, Jennifer Penney, Julian Hosking and Wendy Ellis. The soprano soloist was Teresa Cahill; the conductor was Ashley Lawrence; designs (scenery and costumes) were by Andy Klunder, with lighting by Bill Besant. Also named among the first cast were Ross MacGibbon, Ashley Page, Fiona Chadwick and Genesia Rosato.
