= Different Drummer (ballet) =

Different Drummer is a one-act ballet created by Kenneth MacMillan in 1984 for the Royal Ballet. The music is by Anton Webern (Passacaglia for orchestra, Op. 1) and Arnold Schoenberg (Verklärte Nacht). The story is based on the play Woyzeck by Georg Büchner.

The first performance was on 24 February 1984, at the Royal Opera House, Covent Garden.

== Original cast ==
- Wayne Eagling
- Alessandra Ferri
- Stephen Jefferies
- Guy Niblett
- David Drew
- Jonathan Burrows
- Jonathan Cope
- Antony Dowson
- Ross MacGibbon
- Bruce Sansom
- Stephen Sheriff
