= Winter Dreams (ballet) =

Winter Dreams is a one-act ballet choreographed by Kenneth MacMillan to piano pieces by Pyotr Ilyich Tchaikovsky selected and arranged by Philip Gammon and traditional Russian music selected and arranged for guitar and mandolin ensemble by Thomas Hartman. With scenery and costumes designed by Peer Farmer and lighting designed by Clive Thomas, it was first presented by The Royal Ballet at the Royal Opera House, London, on 7 February 1991.

== Background ==
Macmillan's ballet was inspired by Anton Chekhov's play Three Sisters (1900), sometimes named as one of his four best plays, along with The Cherry Orchard, The Seagull, and Uncle Vanya. First performed in 1901 at the Moscow Art Theater, it concerns the intricate relationships of three sisters marooned in the stultifying atmosphere of a provincial Russian garrison town at the turn of the twentieth century. They all have "winter dreams" of returning to Moscow, where they imagine that their lives would be more interesting and fulfilling.

The action in the ballet does not mirror all the events and incidents in the play. MacMillan noted that "Although the characters in the ballet are named after those in the play, I have not attempted a balletic reworking of the whole story. Sometimes the choreography reflects the inner life of the characters, at other times the narrative. I have tried to capture the atmosphere and melancholy of Chekov's masterpiece."

== Scenario ==
Olga, the eldest of the three sisters, is the matriarchal figure of the Prozorov family, though she is still a young woman. She has given up hope of marriage and has dedicated herself to the exhausting life of a high-school teacher. Masha, the middle sister, finds herself trapped in an unbearable marriage to a boring schoolmaster. She falls passionately in love, for the first time, with the idealistic Colonel Vershinin, the commander of the local army garrison. They begin a clandestine affair. When he is transferred away, she is crushed but returns to life with her forgiving husband. Irina, the youngest sister, has a romantic view of life. While longing for the excitement of Moscow, she works in a dreary job with the local town council. Just as she is about to escape to a marriage of convenience with Baron Tusenbach, he is killed in a duel with a rival suitor. The sisters' brother, Andrey, is married to Natasha, a social climber who has ambitions of taking over the family home. Observing the passions and disappointments of them all are Doctor Chebutykin, a family friend, and Anfisa, the sisters' former nanny.

== Original cast ==
- Darcey Bussell – Masha Kulgina, the middle sister
- Nicola Tranah – Olga Prosorova, the eldest sister
- Viviana Durante – Irina Prosorova, the youngest sister
- Gary Avis – Andrey Prosorov, their brother
- Genesia Rosato – Natasha Prosorova, Andrey's wife
- Anthony Dowell – Fyodor Kulygin, Masha's husband
- Irek Mukhamedov – Lieutenant Colonel Vershinin, Masha's lover
- Stephen Wicks – Lieutenant the Baron Tusenbach, Irina's fiancé
- Adam Cooper – Captain Solyony, a rival suitor
- Derek Rencher – Doctor Chebutykin, an army doctor
- Gerd Larsen – Anfisa, elderly family retainer and former nurse
- Jacqui Tallis – Maid
- Luke Hayden, Philip Mosley, David Pickering, Alistair Marriott – Soldiers

== Digital video disc ==
A performance by the original cast can be seen on a DVD distributed by Kultur International Films Ltd. Produced and directed for BBC Television by Derek Bailey, it was recorded at the Royal Opera House, Covent Garden, in 1990.
