= La Fin du jour (ballet) =

La Fin du jour is a one-act ballet created by Kenneth MacMillan in 1979 for the Royal Ballet, London. The music is Maurice Ravel's Piano Concerto in G (1931).

In MacMillan's words, "La Fin du jour draws its inspiration from the style of the 'thirties'; the designs and choreography are inspired by the fashion plates of an era and a way of life shattered forever by the Second World War."

The first performance was at the Royal Opera House, Covent Garden on 15 March 1979. The leading roles were danced by Merle Park, Jennifer Penney, Julian Hosking and Wayne Eagling. The solo pianist was Philip Gammon, the conductor was Ashley Lawrence, and the designs were by Ian Spurling.
