= Requiem (MacMillan) =

Requiem is a one-act ballet created by Kenneth MacMillan in 1976 for the Stuttgart Ballet. The music is Gabriel Fauré's Requiem (1890). The designer was Yolanda Sonnabend, who had first collaborated with him on 1963's Symphony.

In MacMillan's words, "This danced Requiem is dedicated to the memory of my friend and colleague John Cranko, Director of the Stuttgart Ballet 1961–1973." The first performance was given at Stuttgart on 28 November 1976. MacMillan recreated the piece for the Royal Ballet, London, at the Royal Opera House, Covent Garden on 3 March 1983.

MacMillan's decision to set a ballet to Fauré's Requiem met with opposition from the board of the Royal Ballet. Catholic members of the board felt that sacred music should not be used for ballet. MacMillan wrote to the Archbishop of Canterbury to seek his opinion. Although the response was favourable to MacMillan the board remained unpersuaded. MacMillan then contacted the artistic director of the Stuttgart Ballet who had previously expressed an interest in commissioning a ballet from him. They reacted with enthusiasm. The piece was a portrait of the ballet company coming to terms with the death of Cranko, their much-loved artistic director.

Many of the choreographic images in Requiem were based on drawings and paintings by William Blake, including illustrations for Dante's Inferno, Milton's Paradise Lost and the Old Testament Book of Job. The ballet begins with a group of mourners entering to the accompaniment of the Introitus. A central figure is raised aloft like an offering. She then dances two pas de deux with different men during the Offertorium and the Sanctus, returning to comfort a young woman during the Agnus Dei. In the final section, In Paradisum, the women appear from the wings before all the dancers leave the stage bathed in light and with their backs to the audience.

The ballet was met with acclaim by audiences and critics. Stuttgart Ballet had exclusive rights to perform the ballet for six years, after which it entered the repertory of the Royal Ballet in 1983.

== Original cast ==
Württembergische Staatstheater, Stuttgart, 28 November 1976:

- Marcia Haydée
- Birgit Keil
- Richard Cragun
- Egon Madsen
- Reid Anderson

== Reception ==
Reviewing the Stuttgart premiere for The Times, John Percival rated the piece as MacMillan's best ballet to date, and criticised the Royal Ballet for failing to secure the piece for itself. When the work was staged at Covent Garden in 1983 Percival again praised it, though he was less convinced by the company's dancing, much of which he found too reserved. In The Observer, Jann Parry wrote of, "A beautiful ballet, reminding us that MacMillan can use a corps de ballet as a community rather than a crowd of extras." In Dance Now in 2002 the former Royal Ballet dancer Bruce Sansom, who had appeared in three roles in the work over the years, wrote that the merging of human voices, orchestral playing, and dance was a powerful combination, and that MacMillan "draws them seamlessly together offering equal fulfillment for viewer and performer".
