= Maryon Lane =

South African ballet dancer (1931–2008)

- Born: Patricia Mills; 15 February 1931; Natal Province, South Africa (now Zululand, KwaZulu-Natal, South Africa)
- Died: 13 June 2008 (aged 77); Kyrenia, Cyprus
- Occupation: Ballet dancer
- Spouse: David Blair
- Children: 2

Maryon Lane (15 February 1931 – 13 June 2008) was a South African ballet dancer who became well known in Britain as a ballerina of the Sadler's Wells Theatre Ballet and as a soloist with the Royal Ballet.

== Early life and training ==
Maryon Lane was born as Patricia Mills in Zululand, a district of Natal province (now KwaZulu-Natal) on the Indian Ocean coast of South Africa. When she was about 13 years old, in 1944, her family took her to Johannesburg, in the northern province of Transvaal (now Gauteng). There she studied with the best ballet teachers in the city, including Marjorie Sturman, a specialist in the Cecchetti method, and Reina Berman, who had been trained by the Cecchetti method before switching to the syllabus of the Royal Academy of Dancing (RAD).

In 1946, soon after World War II had ended and peace had returned to Europe, Mills left South Africa and emigrated to the UK, having won an RAD scholarship to attend the Sadler's Wells Ballet School in London. After only a year's tuition there, she was taken into the corps of the Sadler's Wells Theatre Ballet. It was at this point that she adopted her professional name. The company then included a South African dancer named Patricia Miller, so a name change from Patricia Mills was essential: Maryon Lane, distinctively spelled, was her choice.

== Professional career ==
The Sadler's Wells Theatre Ballet was then a small, young troupe founded by Ninette de Valois to nurture dancers and choreographers after the parent company, the Sadler's Wells Ballet, became resident at the Royal Opera House, Covent Garden. Owing to the need to replenish the depleted roster of leading dancers, Lane rose rapidly through the ranks. By 1948, at age 17, she had been named a principal dancer and was appearing in prominent roles in works by de Valois and Frederick Ashton, the chief choreographer of the company. Petite, with dark hair, a pretty, oval face, and ideal proportions, she possessed a vivid personality, a firm technique, and an innate musicality.

De Valois considered Lane the type of dancer that was most valuable of all: not a great star but a repertory dancer capable of demi-caractère and dramatic work as well as the purely classical.

Throughout her career, Lane was admired for her musicality, attack, and sheer domination of the stage. In repertory works, she displayed great charm in such lighthearted roles as Swanilda in Coppélia, Lise in Ashton's La Fille Mal Gardée, and the title characters in John Cranko's Pineapple Poll and Léonide Massine's Mam'zelle Angot, but she was also effective as the vapid Ballerina in Michel Fokine's Petrushka, as the Betrayed Girl in de Valois's The Rake's Progress, and as the adulterous, runaway Bride in Alfred Rodrigues's Blood Wedding. She was praised for her execution of the notoriously demanding and often unrewarding fairy variations in the prologue to The Sleeping Beauty as well as for her performance as the Princess Aurora, the title role. Her greatest contribution at the time, however, was the part she played in the creation of new ballets, in particular those of the young Kenneth MacMillan.

In 1955, MacMillan cast Lane in a principal role in Danses Concertantes, set to the Stravinsky score and with designs by Nicholas Georgiadis, then also at the beginning of a great career. The success of the ballet was such that de Valois immediately transferred it, and Lane, to the main company at the Royal Opera House in Covent Garden. Lane would finish her performing career there as a solo dancer in 1968.

== Roles created ==
Among the roles that Lane created in new works or productions are the following.

- 1947. Valses Nobles et Sentimentales, choreography by Frederick Ashton, music by Maurice Ravel. Role: principal dancer.
- 1950. Trumpet Concerto, choreography by George Balanchine, music by Franz Joseph Haydn. Role: principal dancer, with Svetlana Beriosova, David Blair, Elaine Fifield, David Poole, Pirmin Trecu, and corps de ballet.
- 1951. Casse Noisette (The Nutcracker), choreography by Frederick Ashton, music by Pyotr Ilyich Tchaikovsky. Role: Crystallized Flower, leader of the corps de ballet in "Waltz of the Flowers."
- 1953. Somnamabulism, choreography by Kenneth MacMillan, music by Stan Kenton, arranged by John Lanchbery. Role: pas de trois with David Poole and Kenneth MacMillan.
- 1954. Café des Sports, choreography by Alfred Rodrigues, music by Antony Hopkins. Role: Urchin.
- 1954. Laiderette, choreography by Kenneth MacMillan, music by Frank Martin. Role: Clown, dancing an extended pas de deux with David Poole and a pas de trois with Poole and Johaar Mosaval; an all-South African cast.
- 1955. Danses Concertantes, choreography by Kenneth MacMillan, music by Igor Stravinsky. Role: principal dancer.
- 1955. House of Birds, choreography by Kenneth MacMillan, music by Federico Mompou, arranged by John Lanchbery. Role: pas de trois with David Poole and Doreen Tempest.
- 1955. Madame Chrysanthème, choreography by Frederick Ashton, music by Alan Rawsthorne. Role: Madame Chrysanthème, at the New York premiere at the Metropolitan Opera House.
- 1956. Noctambules, choreography by Kenneth MacMillan, music by Humphrey Searle. Role: Hypnotist's Assistant, with Leslie Edwards as the Hypnotist, Nadia Nerina as the Faded Beauty, Desmond Doyle as the Rich Man, Anya Linden as the Poor Girl, and Brian Shaw as the Soldier.
- 1957. The Prince of the Pagodas, choreography by John Cranko, music by Benjamin Britten. Role: Belle Rose.
- 1958. Ondine, choreography by Frederick Ashton, music by Hans Werner Henze. Role: dancer in lead couple, with Brian Shaw, of a divertissement with Merle Park, Doreenb Wells, Peter Clegg, Pirmin Trecu, and corps de ballet.
- 1958. Agon, choreography by Kenneth MacMillan, music by Igor Stravinsky. Role: principal dancer.
- 1961. Diversions, choreography by Kenneth MacMillan, music by Arthur Bliss. Role: a pas de quatre with Svetlana Beriosova, Donald MacLeary, and Graham Usher.

== Personal and later life ==
Lane was married to her Royal Ballet colleague David Blair, with whom she had twin daughters in 1960. In 1961, Blair was promoted to be Margot Fonteyn's regular partner but was soon overshadowed by the arrival of Rudolf Nureyev in 1962. Both Lane and Blair, along with other leading dancers of the company, sank into relative obscurity in the blaze of publicity about the partnership of Fonteyn and Nureyev.

After leaving the Royal Ballet in 1968, Lane occasionally made guest appearances with London Festival Ballet, Ballet Rambert, and her former home company. She found a new vocation, however, as an inspired and inspiring teacher at the London Ballet Centre. She then taught at the Royal Ballet and Ballet Rambert schools and with other companies, schools and seminars.

In middle age, after her husband died in 1976, she went to live in Cyprus, a former British stronghold in the eastern Mediterranean. There she settled in the Greek Cypriot town of Kyrenia, a thriving cultural centre and popular tourist destination on the northern coast of the island, where she founded her own small school, the Maryon Lane Ballet Academy. After some years of teaching local students, she died in 2008, at age 77.
