= Bruce Sansom =

Bruce Edward Sansom (born September 1963) is a British former ballet dancer, and assistant artistic director and ballet master at San Francisco Ballet.

Bruce Sansom was born in September 1963 in Newbury, trained at the Royal Ballet School, and joined the Royal Ballet in 1982, following performances as Colas in La Fille mal gardée at the Royal Ballet School's Annual Performance in 1981, and a solo in Here We Come in 1982. He became a principal dancer in 1987. He retired from dancing in 2000.

In his early years with the Royal Ballet Sansom danced small roles such as a cavalier in The Sleeping Beauty, a cast member in Dances of Albion: Dark Night Glad Day and Voluntaries, a Mountaineer in Façade, Sailor Boy in Enigma Variations, Mandolin Dance in Romeo and Juliet and a soldier in the premiere of Different Drummer. He then progressed to more prominent roles such as Colas in La Fille mal gardée, Oberon in The Dream and a cast member in Symphonic Variations as well as participating in the premieres of Number Three, Half the House and Galanteries.

From 1990 Sansom expanded his repertoire with principal roles in Gloria, Song of the Earth (The Messenger of Death), The Nutcracker (The Prince), Manon (Des Grieux), A Month in the Country (Beliaev) and the Princes in Swan Lake and Cinderella. He created further roles in Bloodlines, The Planets, Cyrano (Christian), Tombeaux, Tidelines, The Turn of the Screw (Miss Jessel), A Stranger's Taste (Dancer) and There Where She Loves (Five songs). His final performance was his first as Lescaut in Manon, on 25 July 2000.

In May 2000 Sansom took Nijinsky's old role in a reconstruction at the Royal Opera House of the original Jeux.

He retired, after 16 years with the Royal Ballet company, described at the time as "the company's most classical dancer... always reliable, always committed to his roles, he had a wider range than might be expected, taking the leads in almost all the old classics and in many ballets by Ashton, MacMillan, Bintley, Balanchine and Tetley. No fewer than a dozen choreographers picked him to create new roles."

In 2006, he was appointed as director of London's Central School of Ballet, but after three and a half years in post, returned in July 2009 to San Francisco Ballet as Ballet Master and Assistant to the Artistic Director.

On film he may be seen in a Gala for Tchaikovsky (Anastasia: Pas de deux), Still life at the Penguin Café (Texan Kangeroo Rat) and The Prince of the Pagodas (The King of the East). He also appeared in the 1985 television broadcast of The Nutcracker, and the television programme Bintley's Mozart (the ballet Galanteries) in 1987, both on the BBC.
