= My Brother, My Sisters =

German ballet

My Brother, My Sisters is a one-act ballet created by Kenneth MacMillan in 1974 for the Stuttgart Ballet, under the title Mein Bruder, meine Schwestern. The music is by Arnold Schoenberg (Five Pieces for Orchestra, Op. 16) and Anton Webern (Five Pieces for Orchestra, Op. 10 and Six Pieces for Orchestra, Op. 6). The story is loosely based on the lives of the Brontë family. The designer was Yolanda Sonnabend, who had first collaborated with him on 1963's Symphony.

The first performance was on 21 May 1978, at Stuttgart. MacMillan recreated the work for the Royal Ballet in April 1980 at the Royal Opera House, Covent Garden.

== Original cast ==
- Birgit Keil
- Richard Cragun
- Lucia Montagnon
- Reid Anderson
- Jean Allenby
- Sylviane Bayard
- Hilde Koch
