= Corey Baker =

Corey Baker may refer to:

- Corey Baker (baseball) (born 1989), Israeli-American baseball player
- Corey Baker (choreographer) (born 1991), New Zealand choreographer
