= The Invitation (ballet) =

The Invitation is a one-act ballet with choreography and libretto by Kenneth MacMillan, created in 1960 for the Royal Ballet. The music, composed for the work, is by Mátyás Seiber. Featuring Lynn Seymour as The Girl and Desmond Doyle as The Husband, seduction and rape are at the heart of this piece which generated controversy at the time; particularly the scene of the rape. Lynn Seymour contributed greatly to the success of the performance. "If the Invitation is MacMillan's ballet, it is also Miss Seymour's" was written in The Times. The first performance was on 10 November 1960 by the Royal Ballet Touring Company at the New Theatre Oxford. It was first given at the Royal Opera House on 30 December 1960.

Composer Mátyás Seiber was killed in a car crash in September 1960 during a lecture tour of South Africa. The Invitation was his last completed work. An orchestral suite lasting 23 minutes was extracted from the score, and has been recorded.

== Original cast ==
New Theatre, Oxford, 10 November 1960:

- Lynn Seymour
- Christopher Gable
- Shirley Bishop
- Barbara Remington
- Sheila Humphrey
- Anne Heaton
- Desmond Doyle
