= Yolanda Sonnabend =

British theatre and ballet designer and painter (1935–2015)

- Sonnabend in 1985
- Born: 26 March 1935; Bulawayo, Southern Rhodesia (now Zimbabwe)
- Died: 9 November 2015 (aged 80); London, England
- Education: Slade School of Fine Art
- Occupations: Stage designer; portrait painter
- Relatives: Joseph Sonnabend (brother)

Yolanda Paulina Tamara Sonnabend (26 March 1935 – 9 November 2015) was a British theatre and ballet designer and painter, primarily of portraits.

== Early life ==
Sonnabend was born in Bulawayo, Southern Rhodesia (present-day Zimbabwe), the younger child of a sociologist, Dr Henry Sonnabend, and a physician, Dr Fira Sonnabend, both Jewish. Her father was of German-Jewish descent and her mother was of Russian-Jewish descent. They met at Padua University in the 1920s and emigrated to South Africa in 1930. Her brother Joseph Sonnabend (1933–2021) was a scientist and HIV/AIDS researcher.

== Theatre design ==
Sonnabend settled in England in 1954. From 1955 to 1960 she studied painting and stage design at the Slade School of Fine Art. She subsequently taught at the Camberwell School of Art, the Slade, the Central School and at the Wimbledon School of Art.

Sonnabend worked as a theatre and ballet designer for the Royal Opera House and the Royal Ballet, as well as Sadler's Wells, the Oxford Playhouse and Stuttgart Ballet. She designed her first ballet, "A Blue Rose" by Peter Wright, in 1957 when she was a student at the Slade School of Fine Art. She first collaborated with Kenneth MacMillan in 1963 on Symphony and worked with him for over thirty years, including Rituals (1975), Requiem (1976), My Brother, My Sisters (1978) and Valley of Shadows (1983). Swan Lake (1987) and La Bayadère (1980) are some of her key achievements with the Royal Ballet. She was also a painter with Kenneth MacMillan and Physicist Stephen Hawking being two of her most noteworthy subjects.

== Art career ==
In 2001, Sonnabend won the inaugural Garrick/Milne Prize for theatrical painting and portraiture. She was the subject of three National Portrait Gallery portraits. In 2000 she was awarded the Garrick/Milne Prize for theatrical portraiture. Nine of her pieces are in the collection of London’s National Portrait Gallery. A retrospective of her work was held at the Serpentine Gallery in London in 1985-86.

== Death ==
Sonnabend died in England on 9 November 2015, aged 80. She was unmarried and survived by her brother Joseph. Earlier in the year, the siblings had been profiled in the documentary film Some Kind of Love.
