= Nicholas Georgiadis =

- Born: 14 September 1923; Athens
- Died: 10 March 2001 (aged 77); London
- Education: Slade School of Fine Art
- Known for: Scenic design; Costume designer
- Awards: Order of the British Empire; Evening Standard Awards

Nicholas Georgiadis CBE (Greek: Νίκος Γεωργιάδης; 14 September 1923 – 10 March 2001) was a Greek painter, stage and costume designer, best known for his work in ballet, particularly in collaboration with Sir Kenneth MacMillan.

== Early life ==
Georgiadis studied architecture at the National Metsovian University, receiving his degree in 1946, and later won a Fulbright Post-Graduate Scholarship to Columbia University, New York (1952). The following year, he came to London to study Painting and Stage Design at the Slade School of Fine Art, on a grant from the British Council.

== Professional career ==
In 1955, he won the school’s First Prize for Stage Design, which led to his discovery by Dame Ninette de Valois and his commission to design for the Sadler's Wells Theatre, London. This marked the beginning of a professional partnership between Georgiadis and Kenneth MacMillan that was to last for almost four decades.

From 1956 to his death in 2001, Georgiadis worked on some of the most acclaimed productions in ballet, opera and theatre. For MacMillan, he designed a great number of ballets, including Noctambules (1956), Romeo and Juliet (1965), Manon (1974), Mayerling (1978), Orpheus (1982) and The Prince of the Pagodas (1989). Many of these productions continue to be performed to this day, both at the Royal Opera House, London, and internationally. He also collaborated closely with Rudolf Nureyev on such works as Sleeping Beauty (1966), The Nutcracker (1968), The Tempest (1982) and Michael Conway Baker's Washington Square (1985).

Sir John Tooley, former General Director of the Royal Opera House (1970–1988), described him as "one of the most outstanding stage designers of the past century ... a giant and a poet amongst designers [who] dominated the second half of the twentieth century in the way that Léon Bakst and Alexandre Benois had done in the first part." Georgiadis worked actively up until his death on 10 March 2001 in London. He was never married.

Outside his work in the theatre, he was an accomplished painter who had exhibited in Venice and London. He also had a passion for cinema and worked on a number of film projects, the most famous of which is The Trojan Women (1971), starring Katharine Hepburn, Vanessa Redgrave and Irene Papas.

== Achievements and awards ==
He received the CBE for his contribution to the arts in 1984. He had been awarded the London Evening Standard Ballet Award the previous year for his work on Orpheus and The Tempest — the first time a designer had received this outstanding achievement award. In 1999, he was admitted to the Greek Academy of Arts.
