= Johaar Mosaval =

South African ballet dancer (1928–2023)

Johaar Mosaval (8 January 1928 – 16 August 2023) was a South African ballet dancer who rose to prominence as a principal dancer with the Royal Ballet. He was among the first "persons of color" to perform major roles with an internationally known ballet company during the 1960s.

== Early life and training ==
Johaar Mosaval was born in Cape Town, Union of South Africa. He was the eldest of ten children. His family lived in District Six, a largely Coloured community made up of descendants of former slaves, artisans and merchants, as well as many Cape Malays, descendants of South-East Asians brought to South Africa by the Dutch East India Company during its administration of the Cape Colony. Like the vast majority of Cape Malays, Mosaval's family was Muslim.

When Mosaval was a youth, he was noticed by Dulcie Howes, the doyenne of South African theatrical dance, while he was performing gymnastics. She invited him to attend the university of Cape Town Ballet School. Despite the disapproval of his Muslim parents and the white ("European") community, Mosaval accepted her invitation and began his dance training at the ballet school in 1947. He later explained, "It was the height of apartheid and there was no scope for me. She broke the race barrier by taking me to ballet classes. [...] I had to stand at the back of the class. The white boys in the class would give me sideways glances if I happened to grand jeté myself to the front." (Note: Apartheid was in fact only formally instituted in 1948. However, institutionalised apartheid began long before the National Party won the 1948 parliamentary elections. After the establishment of the Union of South Africa in 1910, apartheid laws were on the statute books.) In the classes of Jasmine Honoré, Mosaval advanced quickly, as his strong, flexible physique and iron determination to succeed reinforced his natural facility for classical ballet technique.

Apartheid prevented Mosaval from pursuing a dance career in his home country, but in 1950 he was noticed by visiting ballet celebrities Alicia Markova and Anton Dolin, after he was smuggled into Cape Town's Alhambra Theatre for an audition. They arranged for him to receive a scholarship to attend the Sadler's Wells Ballet School in London. Travel to London was paid with money gathered from friends and fundraising by the local Muslim Progressive Society. His parents never paid a cent towards his education in dance, either because they were too poor or because they never approved of it. "I had many obstacles in terms of my religion; my family was against me," he told the Cape Times in 2018. "As the eldest of 10 children and being a male dancer, my decisions were frowned upon because they were unheard of."

== Performing career ==
Mosaval was recruited by Sadler's Wells Theatre Ballet in 1951.

In 1956, Mosaval was promoted to soloist in the company, which was soon renamed the Royal Ballet. He became a principal dancer in 1960 and a senior principal in 1965. Mosaval toured extensively with the Royal Ballet, dancing in continental Europe, Australia, New Zealand, the Middle East, the Far East, Canada, and the United States as partner to such famous ballerinas as Margot Fonteyn, Svetlana Beriosova, Elaine Fifield, Lynn Seymour, Merle Park, Doreen Wells and fellow South African Nadia Nerina in ballets choreographed by Frederick Ashton, Kenneth MacMillan, Ninette de Valois, and two South Africans, David Poole and John Cranko.

Noted for his performances as Jasper the Pot Boy in Pineapple Poll and as Bootface in The Lady and the Fool, both choreographed by Cranko, Mosaval was also acclaimed as the Blue Boy in Les Patineurs and as Puck in The Dream, both choreographed by Ashton, as well as the Blue Bird in The Sleeping Beauty. He developed a global reputation as a brilliant character dancer with impeccable technique. One Scottish critic wrote about his performance as Puck in 1967: "Puck seems tailor-made for Johaar Mosaval. His apparent ability to pause in the middle of a stupendous scene makes one think of the similar claim made for Nijinsky."

== Later life ==
After twenty-five years with the Royal Ballet, Mosaval retired from performing and returned to Cape Town, settling there permanently in 1976. He did make a guest appearance with CAPAB Ballet in the title role of Michel Fokine's Petruskha, thus becoming the first black dancer to perform on the stage of the Nico Malan Opera House. He was also the first black South African to appear on local television. He opened his own ballet school in 1977 and was employed as the first black Inspector of Schools of Ballet under the Administration of Coloured Affairs. When he discovered that he could share his expertise only with a certain segment of the population, he resigned this position. Subsequently, his school was shut down by apartheid powers when it was discovered to be multiracial. Following the principles of his mentor, Dulcie Howes, Mosaval wanted to share his knowledge and love of ballet with students of all races, so he continued to find ways to dance and to teach.

Johaar Mosaval died from complications of osteoarthritis on 16 August 2023, at the age of 95.

== Honours and awards ==
In 1975, Mosaval was the first dancer to earn a Professional Dancer's Teaching Diploma at the Royal Opera House, Covent Garden. Then, receipt of a Winston Churchill Award allowed him to travel to New York to study modern dance at the Martha Graham School and jazz dance at the Ailey School. In 1977, Mosaval received a Queen Elizabeth II Silver Jubilee Medal for his services to ballet in the United Kingdom. Other awards came to him in recognition of his contributions to South African arts and culture. For his contribution to the performing arts, he was given the Western Cape Arts, Culture, and Heritage Award in 1999; for exemplary conduct, he received a Premier's Commendation Certificate in 2003; and for lifetime achievement, he was awarded the Cape Tercentenary Foundation's Molteno Gold Medal in 2005. For his contribution to the performing arts, and to uplifting young dancers through his teaching, the City of Cape Town then awarded Mosaval its Civic Honours. It had taken almost three decades of exile and personal, artistic triumph in faraway lands before he was allowed to dance in his own country for his own people.

Order of Ikhamanga in gold

The Arts and Culture Trust bestowed on him a Lifetime Achievement award for Dance in 2016.
