= Donald Britton =

Donald Gene Britton (17 August 1929 – 31 May 1983) was a principal dancer with the two Royal Ballet companies, the Sadler's Wells Theatre Ballet and the Sadler's Wells Ballet from 1945 to 1965.

Donald Britton was born in London in 1929. He originally started as a tap dancer "wandering into ballet" at the age of six. His family were living over a ballet school and young Donald became fascinated with the activities downstairs. He studied ballet with the Maddock School in London and then with Lilian Godwin in Bristol before joining the Sadler's Wells Ballet School during the second world war. In 1945 at the age of sixteen he was chosen as one of the founding members of the Sadler's Wells Theatre Ballet. During his early years there he achieved critical acclaim for his performances in Carnaval and Spectre de la Rose.

Following a period of military service he rejoined the Sadler's Wells Theatre Ballet as a principal dancer in 1951. Known for his masculine, aggressive style, a number of leading solo parts were created for Britton by the leading choreographers of their time - Frederick Ashton (Valses Nobles et Sentimentales), Kenneth MacMillan (Danses Concertantes, Solitaire (1956) and The Burrow (1958)), Walter Gore (Carte Blanche) and John Cranko (the title role in Sweeney Todd). Britton also had a mischievous, lighthearted side which was seen to good effect in his portrayals of Captain Belaye in Pineapple Poll and Pierrot in Cranko's Harlequin in April.

Britton left the Royal Ballet in 1965 and taught at the Royal Ballet School. He continued to dance during this time in a number of West End musicals including The Grand Waltz then went on to further teaching in the Arts Educational Schools in London. Britton moved to France and founded the New Danse Studio in Brive in 1978.

Following a serious illness as a result of which he returned to England, Donald Britton died in hospital in Birmingham on 31 May 1983.
