= Michael Coleman (dancer) =

British ballet dancer

Michael Bruce Coleman MBE (born 10 June 1940) is a British ballet dancer, a former dancer of The Royal Ballet and a character artist with the English National Ballet.

== Early life ==
Coleman, was born in Southend-on-Sea, Essex, England. He worked as a photographer's assistant then joined The Royal Ballet School, aged 15 before joining The Royal Ballet touring company in 1959 and then The Royal Ballet at Covent Garden.

== Career ==
Coleman's notable stage performances with The Royal Ballet included Romeo and Juliet (Mercutio), "The Concert" (Husband), Giselle, (Hilarion), Cinderella (Ugly Sister), "Song of the Earth" (Death), "La Fille Mal Gardee" (Colas), "Manon" (Lescaut), "The Sleeping Beauty" (Bluebird), "The Firebird", "Symphonic Variations", "Concerto", "Dances at a Gathering", "Monotones". Coleman has also appeared in the televised performances of The Tales of Beatrix Potter (as Mr. Jeremy Fisher), The Slipper and The Rose, and as Drosselmeyer in The Nutcracker.

Coleman was also part of the original cast of Kenneth Macmillan's Elite Syncopations which premiered on 7 October 1974 in Covent Garden.

Coleman first appeared with The English National Ballet in 1995 as a Guest Artist and continues to work with them in character roles in the UK and abroad.

He danced 'The Husband' in Jerome Robbins' The Concert., when the ballet was first staged at Covent Garden in a gala performance to celebrate the 80th birthday of Queen Elizabeth the Queen Mother.

Coleman was appointed Member of the Order of the British Empire (MBE) in the 2022 Birthday Honours for services to ballet.
