= David Blair (dancer) =

British ballet dancer (1932–1976)

- Born: David Butterfield; 27 July 1932; Halifax, Yorkshire, England
- Died: 1 April 1976 (aged 43); London, England
- Occupation: Ballet dancer
- Spouse: Maryon Lane

David Blair (27 July 1932 – 1 April 1976) was a British ballet dancer and a star of England's Royal Ballet during the 1950s and 1960s.

== Early life and training ==
Born David Butterfield in Halifax, Yorkshire, he started taking ballet lessons after watching his sister in a class at their local dance school. He won a scholarship to the Sadler's Wells Ballet School in London and began training there in 1946, when he was 14. As he was very short in comparison with many of his classmates, Blair's acceptance into the school was on the understanding that he had to grow significantly during his first term or he would receive injections of growth-inducing hormones. Although he grew enough to satisfy the staff of the school, he was still one of the shortest boys in his class. Consequently, his teachers thought that he would become a character dancer.

== Professional career ==
In 1947, at the age of 15, Butterfield joined the Sadler's Wells Theatre Ballet, changing his name to David Blair for theatrical purposes. In 1953, he joined the main company, the Sadler's Wells Ballet (later the Royal Ballet), as a soloist and began performing at the Royal Opera House in Covent Garden. In 1955, he was promoted to principal dancer. After the retirement of Michael Somes, Blair became for a time the regular partner of Margot Fonteyn, prima ballerina of the company, who was nearing the end of her career. He left the company, however, in 1962, shortly after the arrival of Rudolf Nureyev, which had rejuvenated and prolonged Fonteyn's career. There is speculation that Blair's departure was due to the focus of the company administration on the Fonteyn-Nureyev partnership. He, along with other members of the company, slipped into relative obscurity in the blaze of publicity in the media and the clamor of the ballet-going public.

During his career, Blair worked with some of the most notable choreographers of the twentieth century, including Anton Dolin, George Balanchine, John Cranko, Frederick Ashton, and Kenneth MacMillan. Besides Fonteyn, he also partnered leading ballerinas of the company, including Nadia Nerina, Lynn Seymour, and Svetlana Beriosova. His partnership with Nerina is perhaps the most notable. They had danced together as Swanilda and Franz in Coppélia and had won critical acclaim, but it was as Lise and Colas in Ashton's new version of the old French ballet La fille mal gardée that forever solidified them as a pair of young lovers. Ashton made the work for the couple in 1960, with Alexander Grant and Stanley Holden in supporting roles. Set to a new arrangement of Frederick Hérold's music, with much new material by John Lanchbery, and with stunning décor designed by Osbert Lancaster, it was a spectacular success. Both Nerina and Blair are still remembered for it more than fifty years after its premiere.

Blair danced a wide range of roles during his performing days. In his early years, he appeared in Cranko's Pineapple Poll (1951), Harlequin in April (1951), The Prince of the Pagodas (1957), and Antigone (1959). Then came Ashton's La Fille Mal Gardée (1960) and MacMillan's Romeo and Juliet (1965), in which he created the dazzling role of Mercutio. He also danced in classic works—Swan Lake, The Sleeping Beauty, The Nutcracker, and Giselle—and other contemporary ballets in the company repertory. He toured widely abroad with various groups from the Royal Ballet and often appeared on British television programs.

During the mid-1960s Blair expanded his activities to include work as a répétiteur (rehearsal director) and producer. He staged productions of classic ballets for a number of companies worldwide, including Swan Lake and The Sleeping Beauty for the Atlanta Civic Ballet and Swan Lake and Giselle for the American Ballet Theatre. He retired as a dancer in 1973 and became a freelance teacher and coach.

== Personal and later life ==
Blair was married to fellow Royal Ballet principal dancer Maryon Lane, with whom he had twin daughters. In 1976, he was due to become artistic director of the Norwegian Ballet in Oslo, but he died of a heart attack before he could take up the post. He was 43 years old. In 1978, the David Blair Memorial Scholarship was established, allowing a boy to attend the Yorkshire Ballet Seminars, a residential ballet summer school held annually in England.
