= Corey Baker (choreographer) =

New Zealand dancer and choreographer

- Born: 6 June 1990 (age 36); Christchurch, New Zealand
- Dancing career
- Dances: Classical, contemporary
- Website: coreybakerdance.com

Corey Baker (born 6 June 1990) is a New Zealand creative director, choreographer, filmmaker and former dancer.

== Early life ==
Baker was born in Christchurch, New Zealand, on 6 June 1990. He grew up in Hornby and attended Yaldhurst School. In his teens he attended Ao Tawhiti school, then known as Unlimited Paenga Tawhiti.

At age fourteen, he was aspiring to be a musical theatre actor. His English teacher, who ran a ballet class in central Christchurch, saw him tap dancing in the corridor because of his interest and said, "Ballet will help with that." Baker left high school at fifteen to join the International Ballet Academy (IBA) in Christchurch; he danced full time for a year. His lead teacher at IBA was Carl Myers.

== Career ==
Baker has been Resident Choreographer at the Royal New Zealand Ballet and Associate Artist of the Royal Albert Hall. In 2018, Baker created the first professional dance performance in Antarctica, which was filmed for Channel 4 (UK) and aired on Earth Day 2018.

In 2020, Baker received a "Culture in Quarantine" commission from the BBC and remotely directed and choreographed a 3-minute film titled Swan Lake Bath Ballet, filmed by 27 elite ballet dancers in their homes during COVID-19 lockdowns. The film was released in July 2020 and went viral, with over 4 million views by the following month. The film won the 2021 Prix Italia award for web fiction.

In 2021, Baker created two dance films focusing on climate justice: Blown for the BBC and Leaders of a New Regime, which uses Lorde's track of the same title. Dance Race, a commission for the BBC's Dance Passion season, was broadcast on BBC3 in March 2022.

Baker was chief choreographer and movement director for the opening ceremony of the 2022 Commonwealth Games in Birmingham. In 2023, he was creative director for the United Nations's Human Rights 75 Concert in Geneva.

Baker created "The Dead Dance" for Lady Gaga's song of the same name, originally created for season 2 of Netflix's Wednesday and later used for the music video of the single. His other TV credits include choreographing Julianne Nicholson's "Dance Mom" in season 4 of Hacks, Strictly Come Dancing, Ru Paul's Drag Race Down Under, Joe Lycett vs the Oil Giant, The National Lottery's Paralympics GB Homecoming, and advertisements for O2/Dua Lipa, Marks & Spencer and EE. He was choreographer of the 2024 Tim Burton movie Beetlejuice Beetlejuice and movement director of the music promo for Lola Young's 2025 single "One Thing".

== Personal life ==
Baker was in a relationship with American actor Jonathan Groff from 2018 to 2020.

== Filmography ==
=== Film ===
Year	Title	Credited as			Notes
Year	Title	Director	Producer	Choreographer	Notes
2018	Antarctica: The First Dance	Yes	Yes	No	Short film
2020	Spaghetti Junction Dance Film	Yes	Yes	Yes	Short film
2020	Swan Lake Bath Ballet	Yes	Yes	No	Short film
2020	Lying Together Dance Film	Yes	Yes	Yes	Short film
2021	Blown	Yes	Yes	No	Short film
2021	Leaders of a New Regime	Yes	Yes	No	Short film
2022	Dance Race	Yes	No	No	Short film
2024	Beetlejuice Beetlejuice	No	No	Yes	

=== Television ===
Year	Title	Credited as	Notes
Year	Title	Choreographer	Notes
2025	Hacks	Yes	3 episodes
2025	Wednesday	Yes	Episode: "Woe Me the Money"

=== Music video ===
Year	Title	Credited as	Artist(s)	Director
Year	Title	Choreographer	Artist(s)	Director
2025	The Dead Dance	Yes	Lady Gaga	Tim Burton

== Accolades ==
Award	Year	Category	Work	Result
Astra Creative Arts Awards	2025	Best Choreography	Wednesday	Won
Primetime Emmy Award	2026	Outstanding Choreography for Scripted Programming	Wednesday	Nominated
