= Annette Page =

English ballerina

Annette Page (December 1932 – 4 December 2017) was an English ballerina. She was a principal dancer with the Royal Ballet, and was usually partnered onstage by her husband, Ronald Hynd.

== Life ==
Brought up in Manchester, Page began to take ballet classes when she was about four. This led to her taking Royal Academy of Dance exams, and seeing the Royal Ballet in Manchester persuaded her to pursue a dance career.

When she was twelve she auditioned for Ninette de Valois, who offered her a scholarship to attend the Royal Ballet School, at which she began during the final year of the Second World War.

At the age of seventeen she was given a contract by Sadlers Wells, the Royal Ballet's touring company, and a year later joined the Royal Ballet.

Page's debut in 1949 was as the balletic dog "Pepe" in a revival of the 1930s one-act ballet A Wedding Bouquet, based on a play by Gertrude Stein, which was first produced by the Vic-Wells Ballet (later the Sadler's Wells Ballet) on 27 April 1937; choreographed by Frederick Ashton. Dance Magazine promptly reported a rumour that she was being "groomed to succeed Fonteyn in the distant future. ... The rumour ... may be mere wishful thinking, but it is sincerely wishful."

She did, however, rise to become a principal ballerina dancing all the great classical and romantic roles, usually partnered by her husband Ronald Hynd. Other partners included Christopher Gable, Donald MacLeary, Anthony Dowell and Rudolf Nureyev, with whom she danced The Sleeping Beauty and La Bayadere.

Her farewell performance was in April 1967 at the Royal Opera House, Covent Garden where she danced the role of Lise in Ashton's La fille mal gardée. And her final performance was as Cinderella with the Royal Ballet in Seattle, in which she had created a record by dancing the role twice in one day at the Royal Opera House.

== Family ==
Page was later to assist her husband, Ronald Hynd, during his directorship of The Bavarian State Ballet, Munich and was a Member of The Arts Council of Great Britain. Hynd and Page had a daughter, Louise (born 1968).

== Death ==
Page died of motor neurone disease on 4 December 2017, at age 84.
