= Desmond Doyle (dancer) =

South African ballet dancer

Desmond Doyle (16 January 1932 – July 1991) was a South African ballet dancer who performed in England in the 1950s and 1960s before becoming ballet master of The Royal Ballet.

== Early life and training ==
Desmond Doyle was born in Cape Town, South Africa. Dulcie Howes (1908-1993), a ballet dancer, choreographer and teacher, established the University of Cape Town Ballet School in 1934. Among her most promising students during the 1940s were Johaar Mosaval and Doyle. After some years' study with her, and performing under her direction in the University of Cape Town Ballet, both of them went to London to continue their training at the Sadler's Wells Ballet School.

== Professional career ==
In 1951, Doyle was accepted into the Sadler's Wells Ballet, under the direction of Ninette de Valois, and was promoted to soloist in 1953. During his years with the company, renamed the Royal Ballet in 1956, he created roles in a number of new ballets by Frederick Ashton, Kenneth MacMillan, and John Cranko. MacMillan often cast him in "cruel, overbearing roles because of his height and narrow face, as lethal as a knife blade." He was not always villainous, however. He danced many roles in classical and romantic works already in the active repertory, including Les Sylphides, Swan Lake, The Sleeping Beauty, Coppélia, and Sylvia, and took prominent roles in such important ballets as de Valois's The Rake's Progress, Ashton's 'Symphonic Variations, and Alfred Rodrigues's The Miraculous Mandarin. Upon his retirement, he served as the company's ballet master from 1970 to 1975.

== Roles created ==
Among the ballets in which Doyle created roles are the following.

- 1947. Les Diversions, choreography by Dulcie Howes, music by Giaochino Rossini, arranged by Benjamin Britten.
- 1951. Daphnis and Chloë, choreography by Frederick Ashton, music by Maurnce Ravel.
- 1953. The Shadow, choreography by John Cranko, music by Ernõ Dohnányi.
- 1953. Veneziana, choreography by Andrée Howard, music by Gaetano Donizaetti, arranged by Denis Aplver.
- 1955. Madame Chrysanthème, choreography by Frederick Ashton, music by Alan Rawsthorne. Role: Yves, brother of Pierre, danced by Alexander Grant, with Elaine Fifield in the title role.
- 1955. The Lady and the Fool, choreography by John Cranko, music by Giuseppe Verdi, arranged by Charles Mackerras. Role: Signor Midas.
- 1956. Noctambules, choreography by Kenneth MacMillan, music by Humphrey Searle. Role: The Rich Man, with Leslie Edwards as the Hypnotist, Nadia Nerina as the Faded Beauty, Anya Linden as the Poor Girl, Brian Shaw as the Soldier, and Maryon Lane as the Hypnotist's Assistant.
- 1956. Birthday Offering, choreography by Frederick Ashton, music by Alexander Glazunov, arranged by Robert Irving. Role: principal dancer.
- 1960. The Invitation, choreography by Kenneth MacMillan, music by Mátyás Seiber. Role: Older Man, who rapes the Girl, danced by Lynn Seymour.
- 1960. Sweeney Todd, choreography by John Cranko, music by Malcolm Arnold. Role: Mark Ingestre, the hero who destroys the "demon barber" in the end.
- 1963. Symphony, choreography by Kenneth MacMillan, music by Dmitri Shostakovich. Role: dancer in one of the two lead couples, with Georgina Parkinson.
- 1965. Romeo and Juliet, choreography by Kenneth MacMillan, music by Sergei Prokofiev. Role: Tybalt.
- 1968. Jazz Calendar, choreography by Frederick Ashton, music by Richard Rodney Bennett. Role: Saturday, with Michael Coleman, Wayne Sleep, and others.
- 1968. Enigma Variations (My Friends Pictured Within), choreography by Frederick Ashton, music by Edward Elgar. Role: A.J. Jaeger (Nimrod), an Anglo-German music publisher and close friend. Elgar called him Nimrod, described in the Old Testament as "a mighty hunter," because jäger is German for "hunter." The variation recalls a summer's evening stroll while Jaeger and Elgar (Derek Rencher) discuss Beethoven's music before being joined by Alice Elgar (Svetlana Beriosova). Ashton's deceptively simple choreography is based on walking, which has caused the variation to be known as "the walking trio." It wonderfully evokes the meaning of affection and friendship.

== Personal and later life ==
Doyle married fellow dancer Brenda Taylor. They had two children, Philip and Anthony, and five grandchildren who live in Brazil. He died in the seacoast municipality of Maricá, Brazil, in 1991, at the age of fifty-nine. His reason for being in Maricá, a small city about forty miles north of Rio de Janeiro, is not known. If he had traveled from Cape Town, directly across the South Atlantic from Brazil, he had possibly gone there in search of work. He was ballet master at Teatro Municipal in Rio.
