= Carl Myers =

British ballet dancer

Carl Myers is a British former professional ballet dancer now living in Rangiora, New Zealand, and a former Principal of The Royal Ballet and Birmingham Royal Ballet.

Myers originally trained with Sissie Smith, a student of the founder of the Royal Academy of Dance, Adeline Genée. He also trained with Rosella Hightower and at the Royal Ballet School. He was contacted to the Royal Ballet company, performing works by leading choreographers, including work created for him by Sir Frederick Ashton. He later moved to the Sadler's Wells Ballet, today's Birmingham Royal Ballet, where he danced leading roles in Swan Lake, Giselle, Sleeping Beauty, Coppélia, La fille mal gardée, and many more. He has danced works by leading British choreographers including Ninette de Valois, Sir Frederick Ashton, Sir Kenneth MacMillan, and Sir Peter Wright, as well as works by Jerome Robbins, Léonide Massine, Glen Tetley, Hans van Manen, Roland Petit

After retiring from the stage, Carl Myers became the Director of the Yorkshire Ballet Scholarship Centre, established by the American ballet dancer Louise Browne. He holds registered teacher status with the Royal Academy of Dance and has been a teacher at Laine Theatre Arts, as well as numerous summer schools in the UK, Australia and Internationally.
