= Vyvyan Lorrayne =

South African ballet dancer (1939–2022)

Vyvyan Lorrayne (20 April 1939 – August 2022) was a South African ballet dancer. Noted as a "softly classical stylist," she won acclaim as a principal dancer for England's Royal Ballet during the 1960s and 1970s.

== Early life and training ==
Lorrayne was born in Pretoria, the executive capital of South Africa, located in the northern province of Transvaal (now Gauteng). Her parents were Anglophones of British stock, although Pretoria was at the time largely populated by Afrikaners. Having contracted polio when she was four and a half years old, she was sent to numerous dance classes to help in her recovery. Upon finding that only the strict Russian systems of ballet training really helped, she became a pupil of Faith de Villiers, a popular teacher of the Cecchetti method in Johannesburg, not far from her home town. In the early 1950s, the teenage Lorrayne danced with the Johannesburg City Ballet, directed by de Villiers, and, in Natal (now KwaZulu-Natal), with the Durban Civic Ballet, where she studied with Poppins Salomon, a specialist in remedial dance work. In 1956, at age eighteen, she immigrated to England, settled in London, and enrolled in the Royal Ballet School on Barons Court Road. After a year's study there, she was hired as an artist of the Covent Garden Opera Ballet.

== Performing career ==
Lorrayne spent only a few months with the opera company. Later in 1957, she was taken into The Royal Ballet, where she would remain for the next 22 years. During her first decade with the company, she rose slowly through the ranks, until she was appointed a principal dancer in 1967. Favored by Sir Frederick Ashton, chief choreographer of The Royal Ballet, she created memorable roles in four of his later works. With Anthony Dowell and Robert Mead, she danced in the premiere of Monotones (1965), a mesmerizing pas de trois of amazing plasticity and coordination set to the gently haunting Gymnopédies of Erik Satie as orchestrated by Claude Debussy and Alexis Roland-Manuel. In Jazz Calendar (1968), set to music by Richard Rodney Bennett, she led the Wednesday ensemble, and in Enigma Variations (My Friends Pictured Within) (also 1968), set to music by Sir Edward Elgar, she portrayed Isabel Fitton (Ysobel), a viola student of Elgar's. Dancing to Variation VI (Andantino), she created a pensive and, for a moment, romantic image of a pretty young girl. In 1972, she danced with Barry McGrath in Siesta, a sultry, erotic pas de deux set to the music of Sir William Walton and created as a pièce d'occasion for his seventieth birthday.

Other dancemakers also created roles for Lorrayne. American director and choreographer Joe Layton, known primarily for his work on Broadway, cast her in two works staged for the Royal Ballet: The Grand Tour (1971), set to music of Noěl Coward, arranged by Hershey Kay, and O.W. (1972), concerning Oscar Wilde and set to music by Sir William Walton. Ronald Hynd also cast her in two works, both quintessentially English: In a Summer Garden (1972), set to music by Frederick Delius, and Charlotte Brontë (1974), to music by Douglas Young, in which she danced the title role. Peter Wright looked to France and Spain for inspiration in creating Arpège (1974), set to the Harp Concerto in C by François-Adrien Boieldieu, and El Amor Brujo (1975), set to the famous score by Manuel de Falla. In the latter work, identified as a "ballet pantomimico" by its composer, Lorrayne danced the role of the Andalusian gypsy girl Candela, who is haunted by the ghost of her dead husband. Finally, shortly before she left the company, David Bintley created a fitting farewell role for her in the lightly lyrical Meadow of Proverbs (1979), set to music of Darius Milhaud.

Because of her pure classical technique, Lorrayne was cast in many major works in the Royal Ballet repertory, including The Sleeping Beauty, Swan Lake, Cinderella, and The Nutcracker. Besides frequent appearances on the stage of the Royal Opera House, she toured with the company around the world, to Europe, the United States, Canada, South Africa, and Australia. She was often partnered by the male stars of the company, including Anthony Dowell, Donald MacLeary, and Rudolf Nureyev. In 1980, she left the Royal Ballet to form her own company, Ballet Imperiale. A small troupe devoted to presenting works in the Russian classical style, Ballet Imperiale toured the English provinces, Wales, and Scotland. Lorrayne served as administrator, manager, artistic director, and principal dancer all rolled into one. Given the burdens of running the company, not to mention the expense, it is little wonder that the troupe was short-lived.

== Filmography ==
On film and DVDs, Lorrayne's dancing can be seen in two ballet movies made for television by the British Broadcasting Corporation (BBC). She appeared as a lead Snowflake in Rudolf Nureyev's staging of The Nutcracker (1968) and as the Fairy Summer in Frederick Ashton's Cinderella (1969). As an actress, she had a featured role as Madam Bergeron in the Paramount film Top Secret! (1984). An action comedy starring Val Kilmer, it is a parody of Elvis Presley musicals and the spy movies of the Cold War era.

- The Nutcracker (1968) - Snowflake Lead Girl 2 (uncredited)
- Cinderella (1969) - The Fairy Summer
- Top Secret! (1984) - Madam Bergeron

== Death ==
Lorrayne died in August 2022.
