= Vladimir Klos =

Czech-born German former ballet dancer

Vladimir Klos is a Czechoslovakia-born German former ballet dancer.

He was born in Prague.

Klos was a principal dancer with Stuttgart Ballet from 1972-97.

Since 1968, Klos has been in "a private as well as professional partnership" with fellow dancer Birgit Keil.
