= Jennifer Penney =

Canadian ballerina

Jennifer Penney (born 1946) is a Canadian ballerina and a former principal dancer with the Royal Ballet.

Jennifer Penney was born in 1946 in Vancouver, British Columbia, Canada. She studied there with Gweneth Lloyd and Betty Farrally, and then at the Royal Ballet School from 1962–63. Penney joined the Royal Ballet in 1963 and became a principal in 1970.

Dancing one of the four lead roles in Kenneth MacMillan's 1980 Gloria for the Royal Ballet, the critic Clement Crisp wrote of "her beautiful line, her always easy technical command".

Penney retired in 1988 and returned to British Columbia.
