= The Judas Tree (ballet) =

The Judas Tree is a one-act ballet created by Kenneth MacMillan in 1992 for the Royal Ballet. The music is by Brian Elias and the set and costumes were designed by Jock McFadyen.

The first performance was on 19 March 1992, at the Royal Opera House, Covent Garden.

The only clue MacMillan gave in order to understand his intentions is a programme note quoting Kahlil Gibran's poem "On Crime and Punishment": ‘[A]s a single leaf turns not yellow but with the silent knowledge of the whole tree, so the wrongdoer cannot do wrong without the hidden will of you all’.

According to the information at MacMillan's official website, this ballet is about "betrayal and guilt, individual and communal". The plot references the biblical betrayal story of the Kiss of Judas, which leads directly to the arrest of Jesus and his later crucifixion. In this same source it is said that MacMillan was also thinking of contemporary "instances of betrayal, such as the Tiananmen Square massacre in 1989." Since the protesting students demanding democratic reforms were taken down by the Chinese army, "in spite of politicians’ assurances that there would be no violence".

The Royal Ballet website describes it like this: "The Judas Tree is MacMillan's final ballet, and still his most controversial. MacMillan commissioned a score from Brian Elias for the ballet, which had its premiere in 1992. Both MacMillan and Elias were inspired not only by Biblical stories of betrayal but also by contemporary events – the violence in Tiananmen Square; the creation of the financial district in Canary Wharf. As MacMillan admitted of the finished work, ‘There are things in me that are untapped and that have come out in this ballet that I find frightening’."

The current production of the ballet is staged in a way that is reminiscent of West Side Story. A single woman is in the presence of three main male dancers in a bleak urban landscape. Although it is not explicit in the choreography, the woman is physically abused at several points, raped, and eventually murdered by a wider gang. Although she is sometimes portrayed as a victim, she is not always a passive participant, but also wields what power she has to attract, rebut or humiliate some of her suitors. The narrative ends with one of her lovers being blamed for her death, and betrayed by a kiss from the real culprit. The man is murdered by the gang, and the culprit then hangs himself from the scaffolding. The programme notes recommend that this is not a ballet for children under the age of 12.

== Original cast ==
- Irek Mukhamedov
- Viviana Durante
- Michael Nunn
- Mark Silver
- Luke Heydon
