= Jann Parry =

British ballet critic and writer

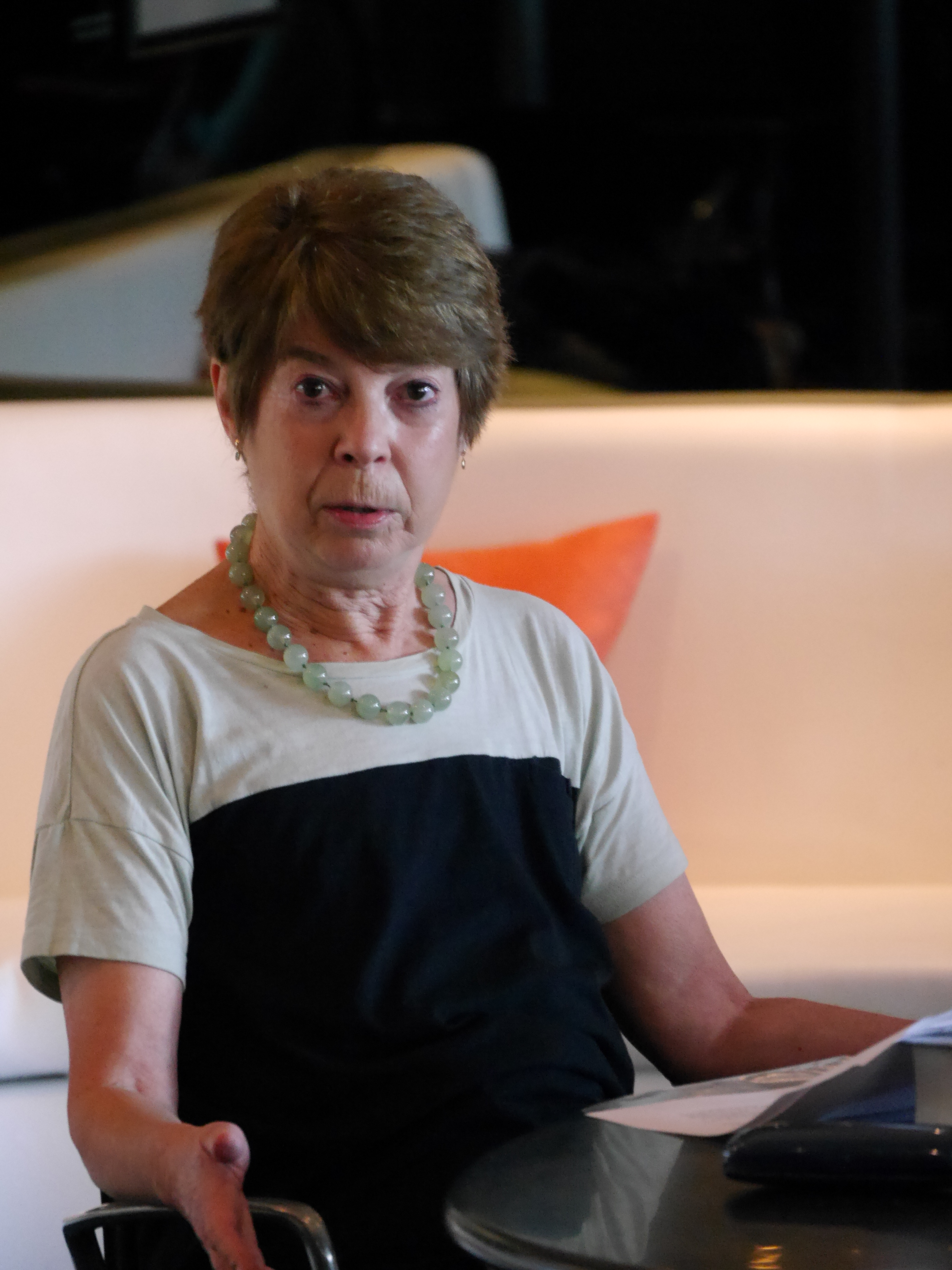
Jann Parry in October 2014

Jann Parry is a British ballet critic and writer. She was ballet critic of The Observer from 1983 to 2004. Her biography, Different Drummer: a Life of Kenneth MacMillan, was the Society for Theatre Research’s book of the year in 2010.
