= Brian Shaw (dancer) =

British ballet dancer (1928–1992)

Brian Shaw (28 June 1928 – 2 April 1992) was a British ballet dancer and teacher. As a leading dancer with the Royal Ballet during the 1950s and 1960s, he was widely regarded as "one of the finest classical male dancers of his generation".

== Early life and training ==
Brian Earnshaw was born in Huddersfield, England, a large market town in West Yorkshire, halfway between Leeds and Manchester. Having begun his dance studies in his home town, he moved to London as a teenager and continued his training at the Sadler's Wells Ballet School. In the summer of 1943, in the midst of World War II, Londoners were "keeping calm and carrying on," as they were advised to do by the British Ministry of Information. In July, the Production Club of the Royal Academy of Dancing arranged a matinee performance of Sadler's Wells students in Suite of Dances, set by resident choreographer Andrée Howard to Handel's jauntily life-affirming Water Music. Among the talented students dancing that afternoon were Philip Chatfield and Brian Earnshaw, both of whom were destined to have distinguished careers with the Sadler's Wells Ballet, later known as the Royal Ballet.

== Professional career ==
With a truncated surname, Brian Shaw joined the Sadler's Wells Ballet upon graduation from its school in June 1944, when he was still only fifteen years old, and was soon promoted to soloist. The shortage of male dancers during the war years doubtless played a part in his quick advancement. Barely two years later, at age seventeen, he was cast by Frederick Ashton in Symphonic Variations (1946), a pure ballet for just six dancers. One observers wrote, "There was nothing virtuoso about the dancing; it was unceasingly lovely and created an impression of effortless lyricism and almost godlike serenity which at moments quickened under the urgent tempo of the music to blaze 'like splendor out of heaven.'"

After being promoted to principal dancer, Shaw went on to create roles in other new ballets by Ashton, John Cranko, and Kenneth MacMillan. His virtuoso technique made him ideal for bravura roles in the standard repertory, where he dazzled audiences at the Blue Bird in The Sleeping Beauty and as the Blue Boy in Les Patineurs. He was known as a brilliant classicist, a dancer who combined purity of line, secure control, spirit, and musicality. His career as a classical dancer virtually ended, however, when he collapsed on stage at the Metropolitan Opera House in New York City in 1967 after tearing an Achilles tendon during a performance of the Blue Bird. Upon recovering from this injury, he continued to perform in character and dramatic roles with the Royal Ballet on the opera house stage. A fine comic actor, he was applauded as an Ugly Sister in Cinderella and as a particularly waspish Widow Simone in La Fille Mal Gardée.

== Roles created ==
- 1946. Symphonic Variations, choreography by Frederik Ashton, music by César Franck. Role: principal dancer. The six dancers in the cast were Margot Fonteyn, Pamela May, Moira Shearer, Michael Somes, Henry Danton, and Shaw.
- 1951. Tiresias, choreography by Frederick Ashton, music by Constant Lambert. Role: Snake, with Pauline Clayden as his partner.
- 1952. Sylvia, choreography by Frederick Ashton, music by Léo Delibes. Role: Slave.
- 1952. Bonne-Bouche: A Cautionary Tale, choreography by John Cranko, music by Arthur Oldham. Role: The Lover, partnering Nadia Nerina.
- 1953. Homage to the Queen, choreography by Frederick Ashton, music by Malcolm Arnold. Role: pas de trois with Julia Farron and Rowena Jackson.
- 1956. Birthday Offering, choreography by Frederick Ashton, music by Alexander Glazunov, arranged by Robert Irving. Role: principal dancer.
- 1956. Noctambules, choreography by Kenneth MacMillan, music by Humphrey Searle. Role: The Soldier.
- 1957. The Prince of the Pagodas, choreography by John Cranko, music by Benjamin Britten. Role: The Prince.
- 1957. Les Patineurs (enlarged version), choreography by Frederick Ashton, music by Giaomo Meyerbeer, arranged by Constant Lambert. Role: Blue Boy, also known as the Blue Skater, a role famously created in 1937 by Harold Turner.
- 1958. Ondine, choreography by Frederick Ashton music by Hans Werner Henze. Role: dancer in lead couple, with Maryon Lane, in a divertissement with Merle Park, Doreen Wells, Peter Clegg, Pirmin Treu, and corps de ballet.
- 1966. Monotones (later known as Monotones I), choreography by Frederick Ashton, music by Erik Satie, orchestrated by John Lanchbery. Role: a pas de trois with Antoinette Sibley and Georgina Parkinson.
- 1968. Enigma Variations (My Friends Pictured Within), choreography by Frederick Ashton, music by Edward Elgar. Role: Richard Baxter Townshend, Oxford don and author of a series of books about the Wild West of America.

== Later life ==
Appointed principal teacher at the Royal Ballet in 1972, Shaw continued to teach there for many years after his accident and was a popular guest teacher with other companies in Europe and America. He was also in demand to assist in revivals of Ashton ballets throughout the world, especially those in which he had created roles, such as Symphonic Variations, or in which he had danced to particular acclaim, such as Les Patineurs. With his longtime companion, Royal Ballet dancer Derek Rencher, he lived a quiet, domestic life. When Ashton died in 1988, he left the "royalties and profits in his copyrights" to a small group of friends, including Shaw, who became owner of the rights in Les Patineurs and Les Rendezvous. in 1992, Shaw himself died in hospital after a short illness. Rencher was his sole survivor. He is buried in Friston, East Sussex.
