= Donald MacLeary =

British ballet dancer

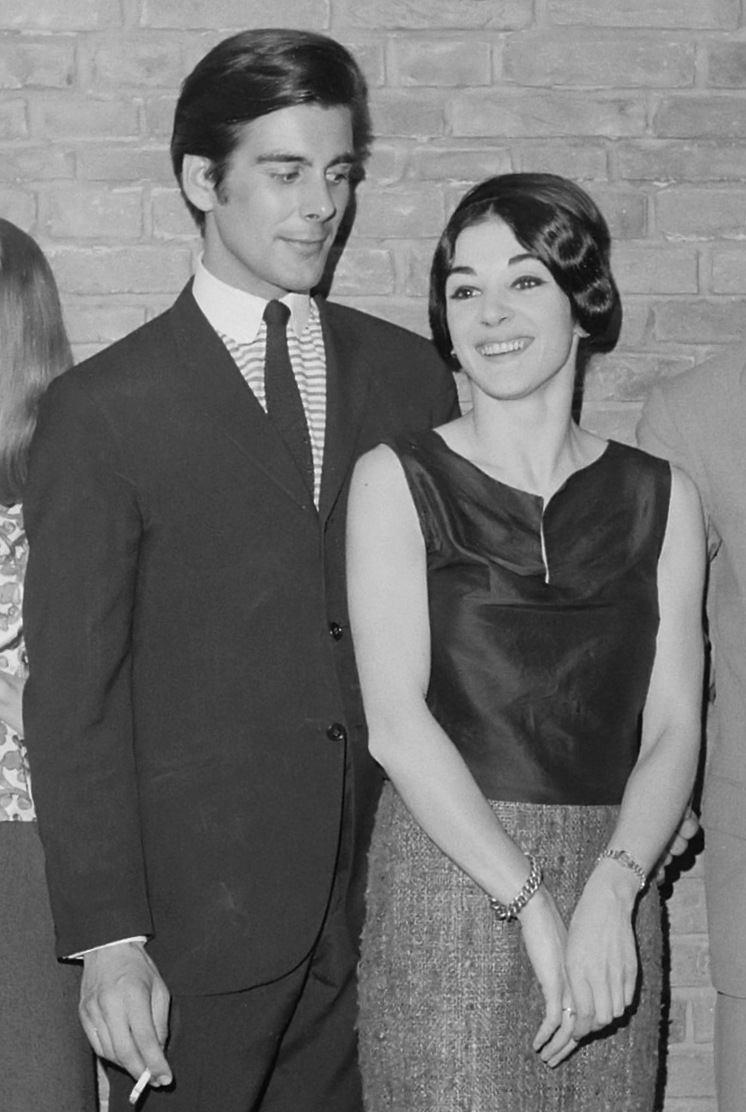
Donald MacLeary and Elizabeth Anderton in 1964

Donald Whyte MacLeary OBE (born 22 August 1937) is a retired British ballet dancer, a former principal dancer and a ballet master with the Royal Ballet, where he was a member of the company for 48 years.

Born in Glasgow, Donald MacLeary studied with Sheila Ross from 1950 to 1951 and at the Sadler's Wells Ballet School. He joined Sadler's Wells Theatre Ballet in 1954. In 1955, he was promoted to soloist. In 1959, he became the Royal Ballet's youngest principal dancer, when Svetlana Beriosova requested that he become her regular partner.

According to Encyclopædia Britannica, MacLeary was "noted for his strong finesse and natural romanticism".

MacLeary created roles in:

- Works by John Cranko
  - The Angels (1957)
  - Antigone (1959)
  - Brandenburg 2 & 4 (1966)
- Works by Kenneth MacMillan
  - Solitaire (1956)
  - The Burrow (1958)
  - Baiser de la fée (1960)
  - Diversions (1961)
  - Symphony (1963)
  - Images of Love (1964)
  - Checkpoint (1970)
  - The Poltroon (1972)
  - Elite Syncopations (1974).

MacLeary was ballet master of the Royal Ballet from 1975 or 1976 to 1979 and repetiteur to principal dancers from 1984. MacLeary retired at the end of the 2001/2002 season after 48 years with the Royal Ballet. He was appointed Officer of the Order of the British Empire (OBE) in the 2004 New Year Honours for services to dance.
