= Julian Hosking =

English ballet dancer (1953–1989)

Julian Hosking (1953–1989) was an English ballet dancer and principal with The Royal Ballet. Trained at the Royal Ballet School from 1964, he joined the company in 1970 and was promoted to principal in 1980. He was noted for roles in Kenneth MacMillan’s La Fin du jour (1979), Gloria (1980), and Isadora (1981), in which he portrayed Edward Gordon Craig; he later appeared as Paris in the Royal Ballet’s 1984 film of Romeo and Juliet. Hosking retired in 1986 and died in London in 1989.

== Early life and training ==
Hosking was born in Cornwall in 1953 of a Viennese mother and Cornish father. He entered White Lodge aged 11 and progressed to the Royal Ballet School. In the 1970 Annual Royal Ballet School Performance at the Royal Opera House, he took the male lead in Les Sylphides.

== Career ==
Hosking joined The Royal Ballet in 1970 and was promoted to principal dancer in 1980, performing a wide range of roles across the Royal Ballet repertoire at Covent Garden from 1971 to 1986.

He danced prominently in premieres and revivals of Kenneth MacMillan’s works, including La Fin du jour (world premiere, 15 March 1979, Royal Opera House) and Gloria (premiere, 13 March 1980).

Between 1975 and 1977 Hosking took leave from the company to study Egyptology and art history in Italy. During this period and afterwards he developed a close personal and artistic partnership with the painter André Durand, who created portraits and mythological works featuring Hosking and later wrote of Hosking’s influence on his art.

=== Film and television ===
He may be seen as Edward Gordon Craig (a role he created) in the television filmed version of Isadora from 1982 (issued on DVD in 2011 by Odeon Entertainment, with the 1968 feature film Isadora) and as Paris in the 1984 Royal Ballet film of Romeo and Juliet.

== Selected roles ==
- Edward Gordon Craig in MacMillan’s Isadora (1981; role creator)
- Featured roles in MacMillan’s La Fin du jour (1979) and Gloria (1980)
- Paris in MacMillan’s Romeo and Juliet (Royal Ballet, 1984 film and stage revival)
