= Vergie Derman =

South African-born British ballet dancer (born 1942)

Vergie Derman (born 18 September 1942 in Johannesburg) is a South African-born British former ballet dancer.

With The Royal Ballet, Derman was promoted to a soloist in 1968, and principal in 1972.
