= Fiona Chadwick =

British ballerina

Fiona Chadwick is a British ballerina and a former principal dancer with the Royal Ballet. She is now a ballet teacher.

Fiona Chadwick was born in Morecambe, Lancashire. She began her training at the Sandham Fitchett school in Preston. Chadwick continued at the Royal Ballet School, and joined The Royal Ballet in 1978. She was promoted to Soloist in 1981 and Principal in 1984.

Chadwick created the role of The Queen in Matthew Bourne’s production of Swan Lake, playing the role in both the West End and in the film.

Chadwick was Head of Dance at White Lodge, the Royal Ballet Lower School, for some years.
