= Genesia Rosato =

English ballet dancer

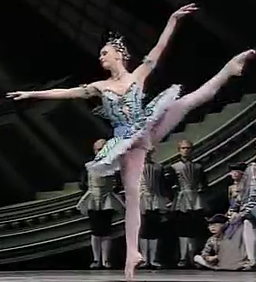
- Genesia Rosato as Fairy Candide in Sleeping Beauty (1994)
- Born: 29 September 1957 (age 68); Surrey, England
- Occupation: Ballet dancer

Genesia Rosato (born 29 September 1957) is a retired British ballerina. She was a principal character artist with the Royal Ballet, Covent Garden, where her career lasted four decades from 1976 to 2016.

== Early life ==
Genesia Rosato was born in Surrey and is of Italian descent. She attended St Maur's Convent in Weybridge. As suggested by Worthing dance teacher Joan Watts, Rosato joined Royal Ballet School in 1972 at age 15.

== Career ==
Genesia Rosato joined the Royal Ballet in 1976. In 1978, she created the role of Princess Louise in Kenneth MacMillan's ballet Mayerling. Her other appearances in recorded performances include fairy Candide and Carabosse in Sleeping Beauty, respectively in 1994 and 2006, and the dancing mistress in The Nutcracker in 2015.
