= Ross MacGibbon =

Ross MacGibbon (born 29 January 1955) is a British former ballet dancer, and now a film maker, especially for ballet and opera.

Ross MacGibbon danced with the Royal Ballet from 1973 to 1986.

MacGibbon won the 1998 International Emmy Award for his film of Kenneth MacMillan's final ballet, The Judas Tree.
