= Birgit Keil =

German ballet dancer

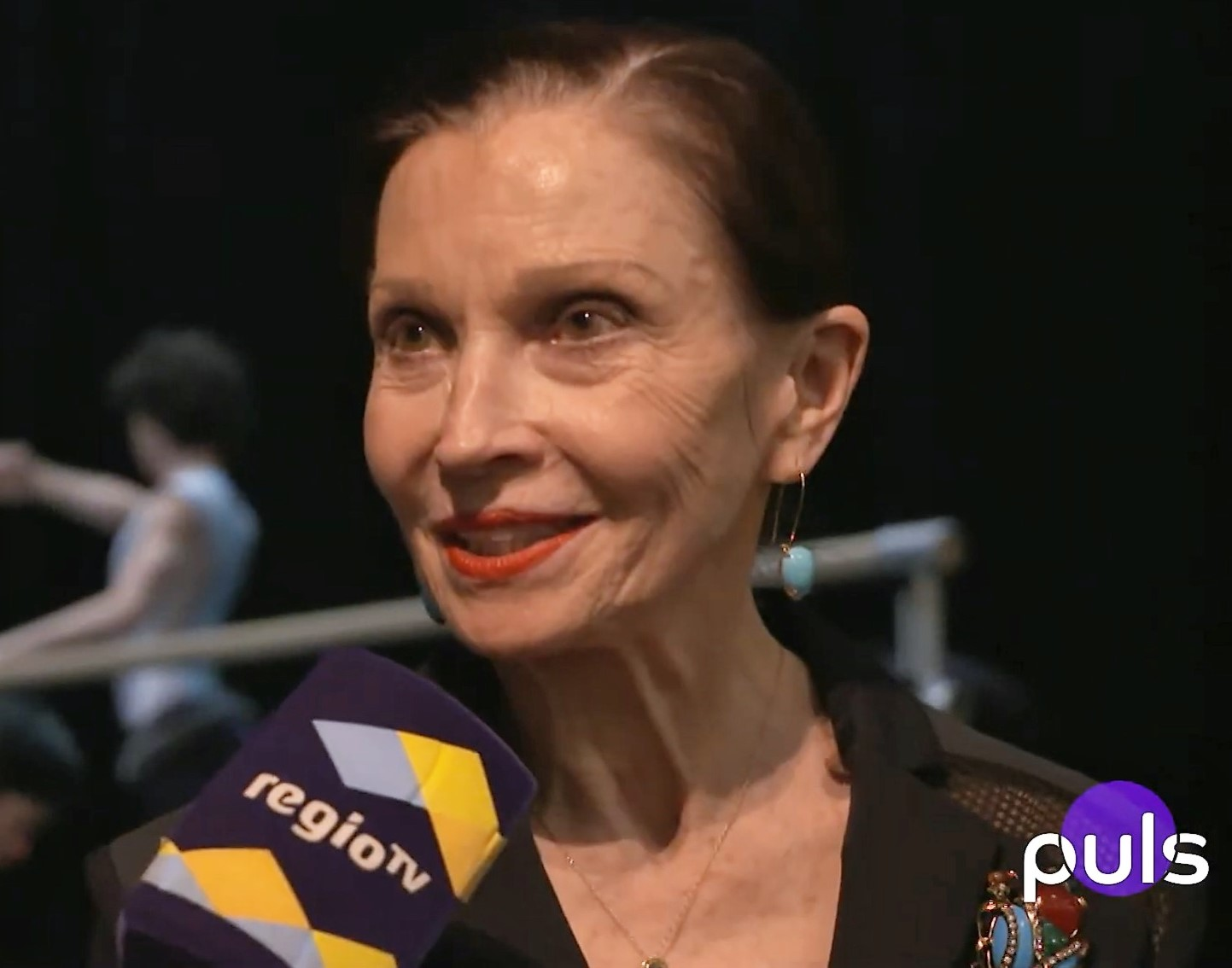
- Keil interviewed by Regio TV Stuttgart in 2017
- Born: 22 September 1944 (age 81); Kowarschen, Occupied Czechoslovakia
- Education: Royal Ballet School
- Occupations: Prima ballerina; Academic teacher
- Years active: 1961–present
- Organizations: Stuttgart Ballet; Musikhochschule Mannheim; Badisches Staatstheater Karlsruhe

Birgit Keil (born 22 September 1944) is a German ballet dancer. She was prima ballerina of the Stuttgart Ballet and was internationally known as The German Ballerina, She has been teaching at the Hochschule für Musik und Darstellende Kunst Mannheim and directing the ballet ensemble of the Badisches Staatstheater Karlsruhe.

== Career ==
Keil was born in Kowarschen. She was trained as ballet dancer in Bad Kissingen and in Stuttgart at the ballet school of the Staatstheater Stuttgart. She studied in London at the Royal Ballet School for one year on a scholarship. In 1961, she became a member of the company Stuttgart Ballet, in 1963 she was appointed soloist by John Cranko. She performed major parts of classical as well as modern ballet, as a partner of dancers such as Richard Cragun, Rudolf Nureyev and Mikhail Baryshnikov. Choreographers John Cranko, Eliot Feld, Marcia Haydée, Jirí Kylián, Kenneth MacMillan, Hans van Manen, John Neumeier, Uwe Scholz, Heinz Spoerli, Glen Tetley and Peter Wright created choreographies for her. She was known internationally as "die deutsche Ballerina" (The German Ballerina), dancing at the Paris Opéra, La Scala, with the American Ballet Theatre, the Royal Ballet and the Vienna State Opera, among others.

Keil retired from the stage in 1995. She has been director and professor of the Akademie des Tanzes (Academy of Dance) at the Hochschule für Musik und Darstellende Kunst Mannheim, teaching classical ballet, repertory, variations and pas de deux. She is convinced that a classically trained dancer is able to dance in a wide range of styles. From 2003, Keil has been director of the ballet ensemble of the Badisches Staatstheater Karlsruhe in Karlsruhe, called Staatsballett Karlsruhe from 2013.

== Awards ==
Keil was awarded the Order of Merit of Baden-Württemberg in 1979 and was named Kammertänzerin in 1980. She received the Preis des Verbands der deutschen Kritiker in 1981, an Emmy Award in 1984, the John Cranko Medal in 1985, the Order of Merit of Germany in 1985, the Deutscher Tanzpreis in 1998, and the Großer Sudetendeutscher Kulturpreis in 1999.

== Personal life ==
Since 1968, Keil has been in "a private as well as professional partnership" with Vladimir Klos, who was a principal dancer with the Stuttgart Ballet from 1972–97.

== Literature ==
- Clive Breez: Birgit Keil: Porträt einer Ballerina. Neske, Pfullingen 1991, ISBN 3-7885-0334-3.
