= Elaine Fifield =

Australian ballerina

- Born: 28 October 1930; Sydney, New South Wales, Australia
- Died: 11 May 1999 (aged 68); Perth, Western Australia, Australia
- Occupation: Ballerina
- Spouse(s): John Lanchbery; Les Farley
- Children: 3 daughters

Elaine Fifield (28 October 1930 - 11 May 1999) was an Australian ballerina, perhaps best known for creating the title role in John Cranko's comic ballet Pineapple Poll in 1951.

== Early life ==
Elaine Fifield was born in Sydney, New South Wales on 28 October 1930. She trained at the Scully School and with Leon Kelloway, in Australia. In 1945, she won a Royal Academy of Dance scholarship, and trained at the Royal Ballet School.

== Career ==
In 1947, Fifield joined Sadler's Wells Theatre Ballet. Her work there included lead dancer in Selina (1948), a ballet choreographed by Andrée Howard to the music of Rossini, scenario and design by Peter Williams. She also appeared as a dancer in the 1948 Crown Film Unit film, Steps of the Ballet, also with choreography by Howard, and music by Arthur Benjamin, directed by Muir Mathieson.

In 1954 moved to The Royal Ballet, where the following year she danced in the Frederick Ashton ballet (to music by Benjamin Britten) Variations on a Theme of Purcell, portraying the oboe. In 1957, she returned to Australia and joined the Borovansky Ballet, which was to form the basis of The Australian Ballet. In 1964, she returned as a principal artist with The Australian Ballet, having been invited to do so by its artistic director, Peggy van Praagh.

== Personal life ==
Fifield married the Director of the Royal Ballet, John Lanchbery, in 1951, but their marriage was dissolved in 1960. They had a daughter, Margaret Lanchbery, who lived in Melbourne and survived both of her parents. Lanchbery became an Australian citizen in 2002, and resided in Melbourne, where he died on 27 February 2003. In 1960, she married the plantation owner Les Farley, by whom she had two more daughters.
