= David Drew (dancer) =

English ballet dancer (1938–2015)

David Drew MBE (12 March 1938 – 16 October 2015) was an English ballet dancer and Principal Character Artist of The Royal Ballet.

== Biography ==
Drew was born in London in 1938. He received his early training in dance at the Westbury School of Dancing in Bristol, before entering professional ballet training at the Royal Ballet School. He was a dancer with The Royal Ballet for the entire duration of his career: he joined the company in 1955 and was promoted to Soloist in 1961 and to Principal in 1974. He retired from The Royal Ballet as a Principal dancer following the 2002/2003 season, but continued to dance with the company as a Principal Character Artist and, in recognition of his long service to the company, he was also awarded the honorary title of Guest Artist. He contributed significantly to the improvement of the working conditions of the dancers notably during the redevelopment of the Royal Opera House between 1997 and 1999. He was the union representative of The Royal Ballet for 40 years. He retired as a dancer in 2012. Drew was a teacher of pas de deux at the Royal Ballet School, the founder President of the Ballet Association, and in 2006, he was awarded the MBE for services to dance. He was married to actress June Ritchie.

He died on 16 October 2015.

== Repertoire ==
=== Created roles ===
- The Captain in Different Drummer, choreographed by Sir Kenneth MacMillan
- Colonel Middleton in Mayerling, choreographed by Sir Kenneth MacMillan
- Demetrius in The Dream, choreographed by Sir Frederick Ashton
- The Gaoler in L'histoire de Manon, choreographed by Sir Kenneth MacMillan
- Giles in The Crucible, choreography by William Tuckett
- Grand Master in Rituals, choreographed by Sir Kenneth MacMillan
- Max Merz in Isadora, choreographed by Sir Kenneth MacMillan

=== Other roles ===
- Anastasia – The Husband
- La Bayadère – The Rajah and The Brahmin
- Cinderella – Ugly Sister and Cinderella's Father
- Cyrano – de Guiche
- Don Quixote
- Enigma Variations – Nevinson
- The Firebird – Kostcheï
- Giselle – Hilarion and the Duke of Courtland
- Job – Satan
- La fille mal gardée – Thomas
- Manon – Monsieur G.M.
- Marguerite and Armand – The Father
- Mayerling – Emperor Franz-Josef
- A Month in The Country – Yslaev
- Petrushka – The Conjurer
- The Prince of the Pagodas – The Emperor's Chancellor
- Romeo and Juliet – Friar Laurence, Mercutio, Lord Capulet and Tybalt
- The Sleeping Beauty – Catalabutte and The King
- Swan Lake – Baron von Rothbart
- The Tales of Beatrix Potter – Mrs Pettitoes
- Winter Dreams – Doctor Chetbutkin
