= Derek Rencher =

British ballet dancer

Rencher as Paris in MacMillan's Romeo and Juliet

Derek Rencher (6 June 1932 – 20 December 2014) was a British ballet dancer. A commanding figure among Royal Ballet character dancers for more than four decades, he was probably the most prolific performer in the company's history.

== Early life and training ==
Rencher was born in Birmingham, an industrial, commercial, academic, and cultural center in the West Midlands of England. He grew up in a working-class family, as his father was employed by the toolmakers John Rabone & Sons. An industrious student, he won a scholarship to the Royal College of Art in London, where he pursued a course of study in design and art history. In the early 1950s, at age nineteen, he took a job as an extra during filming of Invitation to the Dance, a Gene Kelly movie intended to educate mainstream audiences about the world of professional dancing. Besides Kelly himself, and such musical theater dancers as Carol Haney and Tommy Rall, the cast included international ballet stars Igor Yousekevitch, Claire Sombert, Tamara Toumanova, Diana Adams, David Paltenghi, and Claude Bessy. Enchanted by the experience, Rencher decided to switch to a dance career and began to take ballet classes with Igor Schwezoff at his private studio and with Jill Gregory and George Goncharov, who taught alongside Vera Volkova at the Sadler's Wells Ballet School.

== Professional career ==
Within two years, Rencher had been recruited by Ninette de Valois into the Sadler's Wells Ballet, mainly because of his impressive height, trim physique, noble bearing, and remarkably good looks. A quick learner, he made his mark in mid-1950s ballets by rising young choreographers Kenneth MacMillan, Alfred Rodrigues, and John Cranko. Over the next forty years, during which the Sadler's Wells Ballet was renamed the Royal Ballet, he would originate roles in ballets by Frederick Ashton, Robert Helpmann, Antony Tudor, and Rudolf Nureyev, as well as appearing in character roles in the company repertory.

Tall and lithe, with a Roman profile, Rencher cut an imposing figure on stage. He made a strong impression in his early appearances at Covent Garden in 1956, dancing in MacMillan's Noctambules and Rodgrigues's The Miraculous Mandarin. He was promoted to soloist in 1957 and to principal dancer in 1969. Almost thirty years later, as a "guest principal character artist," he danced his last season with the company in 1997–98. In his long career with the Royal Ballet, he won acclaim particularly for his powerful stage presence and for his versatility as a mime, as he was able to convey villainy, authority, and comedy with equal effectiveness. He often played a neglected or unlikeable "other man" in romantic triangles alongside the great actress-ballerinas Svetlana Beriosova, Natalia Makarova, and Lynn Seymour, to whom he provided strong but courteous emotional opposition. In 1965, when he danced Paris in Romeo and Juliet, with Margot Fonteyn and Rudolf Nureyev, he was so strikingly seductive that one viewer was moved to remark that Juliet had shown singularly poor judgment in her choice of Romeo.

Rencher was highly valued by audiences for his portrayals of antagonistic characters in classic ballets, as he was able to invest them with unexpected dimensions. His Von Rothbart in Swan Lake was a formidable evil force; his High Brahmin in La Bayadère was aloof and complex, not merely a melodramatic villain; and his Kostchei in The Firebird was inhumanly frightening. He was equally appealing to audiences in comic roles. As one of the suitors of the Ugly Sisters in Cinderella, he was highly amusingly in a small role that usually went unnoticed, and he gave a hilarious performance as a gigantic, bonneted Mrs. Pettitoes, the old sow who is the mother of Pigling Bland in The Tales of Beatrix Potter. In addition to these roles, his repertory included character parts in The Sleeping Beauty, Sylvia, Giselle, and The Nutcracker, as well as in Ashton's Les Illuminations, Helpmann's Hamlet, Cranko's The Lady and the Fool, and Léonide Massine's Mam'zelle Angot.

Besides his appearances on stage, Rencher occasionally exercised his talent for costume design. For the Australian Ballet, he dressed the dancers in two ballets by Ray Powell: One in Five (1961), a lighthearted work set to music by Johann Strauss, and A Fool's Tale (1962). For the Royal Ballet, he made designs for costumes in two Ashton ballets: Lament of the Waves (1970) and Siesta (1972), a pas de deux for Vyvyan Lorrayne and Barry McGrath. For the Pennsylvania Ballet, he designed stage wear for act 3 of a 1972 production of Swan Lake, the court scene with a series of national dances and the famous Black Swan pas de deux.

== Roles created ==
Among the many roles that Rencher created in his long career are the following.

- 1957. The Prince of the Pagodas, choreography by John Cranko, music by Benjamin Britten. Role: The Emperor.
- 1961. Persephone, choreography by Frederick Ashton, music by Igor Stravinsky. Role: Demaphoön, earthly husband of Persephone, danced by Svetlana Beriosova.
- 1963. Elektra, choreography by Robert Helpmann, music by Malcolm Arnold. Role: Aegisthus, lover of Clytemnesta, danced by Monica Mason.
- 1964. The Dream, choreography by Frederick Ashton, music by Felix Mendelssohn-Bartholdy, arranged by John Lanchbery. Role: Lysander, in love with Hermia, danced by Vergie Derman.
- 1964. Hamlet (revival of 1942 work), choreography by Robert Helpmann, music by Pyotr Ilyich Tchaikovsky. Role: Claudius, king of Denmark, with Rudolf Nureyev as Hamlet, David Drew as Laertes, and Monica Mason as Gertrude, Hamlet's mother and queen of Denmark.
- 1965. Romeo and Juliet, choreography by Kenneth MacMillan, music by Sergei Prokofiev. Role: Paris, with Rudolf Nureyev and Margot Fonteyn in the title roles.
- 1967. Shadowplay, choreography by Antony Tudor, music by Charles Koechlin. Role: Terrestrial, with Merle Park as Celestial and Anthony Dowell as the Boy with Matted Hair.
- 1968. Enigma Variations (My Friends Pictured Within), choreography by Frederick Ashton, music by Edward Elgar. Role: Edward Elgar.
- 1971. Anastasia (three-act version), choreography by Kenneth MacMillan, music by Pyotr Ilyich Tchaikovsky and Bohuslav Martinů, with electronic music by Fritz Winckel and Rüdiger Rüfer. Role: Tsar Nicholas II, father of Anastasia, danced by Lynn Seymour.
- 1972. The Walk to the Paradise Garden, choreography by Frederick Ashton, music by Frederick Delius. Role: Death, in a pas de trois with Merle Park and David Wall.
- 1974. Manon, choreography by Kenneth MacMillan, music by Jules Massenet, arranged by Leighton Lucas with Hilda Graunt. Role: Monsieur G.M., a wealthy old man, a debauchee who ruins Manon, danced by Antoinette Sibley with Anthony Dowell as her lover the Chevalier des Grieux.
- 1976. A Month in the Country, choreography by Frederick Ashton, music by Frédéric Chopin. Role: Ratikin, admirer of Natalia Petrovna, danced by Lynn Seymour.
- 1978. Mayerling, choreography by Kenneth MacMillan, music by Franz Liszt, orchestrated by John Lanchbery.. Role: Prince Philipp of Coberg, friend of Crown Prince Rudolph, portrayed by David Wall.
- 1981. Isadora, choreography by Kenneth MacMillan, music by Richard Rodney Bennett. Role: Paris Singer, lover of Isadora, danced by Merle Park.
- 1982, The Tempest, choreography by Rudolf Nureyev, music by Pyotr Ilyich Tchaikovsky, arranged by John Lanchbery. Role: Alonso, king of Naples and father of Ferdinand.
- 1991. Winter Dreams, choreography by Kenneth MacMillan, music by Pyotr Ilyich Tchaikovsky, arranged by Philip Gammon, traditional Russian music arranged for guitar ensemble by Thomas Hartman. Role: Dr. Chebutykin.
- 1993. Don Quixote, original choreography by Marius Petipa and Alexander Gorsky, modified by Mikhail Baryshnikov in 1978, and staged for the Royal Ballet by Anthony Dowell; music by Ludwig Minkus. Role: Don Quixote.

== Personal life ==
Rencher's first serious relationship was with Anthony Dowell, his young costar in Tudor's Shadowplay (1967). Dowell had joined the Royal Ballet immediately after graduating from the Royal Ballet School and was soon attracted to the older, more experienced, and very handsome Rencher. The attraction was mutual, as Dowell was a bright, beautiful, and charming young man. After their romance cooled, Rencher formed a more lasting relationship with Brian Shaw (1928-1992), a fine classical dancer, like Dowell, with the Royal Ballet. Upon Shaw's death, Rencher inherited the rights to two Ashton ballets, Les Patineurs and Les Rendezvous, that the choreographer had left to Shaw. In his last will and testament, Rencher bequeathed the rights to these important works to the Royal Ballet School.

He is buried in Margravine Cemetery in Hammersmith, West London.
