= Enigma Variations (ballet) =

Ballet by Frederick Ashton

- Choreographer: Frederick Ashton
- Music: Edward Elgar
- Premiere: 25 October 1968; Royal Opera House, London
- Original ballet company: The Royal Ballet
- Design: Julia Trevelyan Oman
- Setting: Worcestershire, England, 1899

Enigma Variations (My Friends Pictured Within) is a one-act ballet by Frederick Ashton, to the music of the Variations on an Original Theme (Enigma Variations), Op. 36, by Edward Elgar. The work was first given by the Royal Ballet at the Royal Opera House, Covent Garden, London, on 25 October 1968. It has been revived in every subsequent decade.

== Background ==
Elgar's variations portray, in his words, "My friends pictured within", celebrating, and in some cases caricaturing, members of his circle. He commented to one of them, Troyte Griffith, years after the premiere that if the variations had been written by a Russian rather than an Englishman they would long ago have been turned into a ballet. It was not until six years after the composer's death that an attempt was made to do so, by the choreographer Frank Staff for Ballet Rambert in 1940. Staff's ballet focused on the mood of the variations rather than on the personalities who inspired it.

The idea for Ashton's ballet originated in the early 1950s, when the designer Julia Trevelyan Oman, then still a student, submitted designs for a ballet to be based on Elgar's music. At the time the idea was not taken up, but in the 1960s Ashton had come round to it, and invited Trevelyan Oman, by then a rising star of theatre design, to collaborate.

Ashton used the whole of Elgar's published score, with the exception of the finale, for which he went back to the composer's original ending. When completing the score in 1898, Elgar had been persuaded by his publisher (portrayed as "Nimrod" of the variations) to add a further 96 bars to the ending. With the permission of the Elgar estate, Ashton used the shorter version, previously unheard by even the most dedicated Elgarians. The playing time of the ballet is about half an hour.

== Synopsis ==
The piece shows an imaginary gathering of Elgar and his friends at the Elgars' house in Worcestershire. The composer, at this point in his career struggling and little known, is awaiting a message from London. While they are waiting, the Elgars and their friends are portrayed in dances representing their personalities. After the last of these, Ashton contributes his own "enigma"; a telegram arrives: the characters know, but the audience does not, that it is from the celebrated conductor Hans Richter agreeing to conduct Elgar's new work. There is an exuberant finale.

Ashton, drawing on a commentary written by the composer in 1929, (Note: Notes for the Aeolian Company's piano rolls of a transcribed score of the piece. Posthumously republished in 1946 as My Friends Pictured Within.) included in the programme alongside the cast list the notes in the third column, below. The words in quotation marks are by Elgar.

Theme (andante)	Edward Elgar (E.D.U.)	
Var. I.	The Lady – Elgar's wife (C.A.E.)	"Whose life was a romantic and delicate inspiration."
Var. II.	Hew David Steuart-Powell (H.D.S-P.)	One of Elgar's chamber-music cronies.
Var. III.	Richard Baxter Townshend (R.B.T.)	An amiable reedy-voiced eccentric who rode about on a tricycle.
Var. IV.	William Meath Baker (W.M.B.)	"With a slip of paper in his hand forcibly read out the arrangements for the day and hurriedly left with a bang."
Var. V.	Richard Penrose Arnold (R.P.A.)	Son of Matthew Arnold, a quiet contemplative scholar.
Var. VI.	Isabel Fitton (Ysobel)	Charming and romantic
Var. VII.	Arthur Troyte Griffith (Troyte)	A very close friend, outspoken and brusque though "the boisterous mood is mere banter."
Var. VIII.	Winifred Norbury (W.N.)	"Her gracious personality is sedately shown."
Var. IX.	A.J. Jaeger (Nimrod)	This variation recalls a summer evening's talk about Beethoven and, further, reveals the depth of a friendship.
Var. X.	Dora Penny (Dorabella)	"The movement suggests a dance-like lightness." An intimate portrait of a gay but pensive girl with an endearing hesitation in her speech.
Var. XI.	George Robertson Sinclair (G.R.S.)	Or rather "his bulldog Dan who fell into the river and barked rejoicing on landing. G.R.S. said 'Set that to music.' I did; here it is."
Var. XII.	Basil G. Nevinson (B.G.N.)	"An amateur cello player of distinction – a serious and devoted friend."
Var. XIII.	*** (Lady Mary Lygon)	"The asterisks take the place of the name of a lady who was, at the time of the composition, on a sea voyage."
Var. XIV.	Finale "E.D.U. (Edward Elgar) "	"Written at a time when friends were dubious and generally discouraging as to the composer's musical future", this variation is merely to show what he intended to do. References to Alice Elgar and to Nimrod, two great influences on the life and art of the composer, are entirely fitting to the intention of the piece.

== Original cast ==
- Edward Elgar (E.D.U.) – Derek Rencher
- The Lady (C.A.E.) – Svetlana Beriosova
- Hew David Steuart-Powell (H.D.S-P.) – Stanley Holden
- Richard Baxter Townshend (R.B.T.) – Brian Shaw
- William Meath Baker (W.M.B.) – Alexander Grant
- Richard P. Arnold (R.P.A.) – Robert Mead
- Isabel Fitton (Ysobel) – Vyvyan Lorrayne
- Arthur Troyte Griffith (Troyte) – Anthony Dowell
- Winifred Norbury (W.N.) – Georgina Parkinson
- A.J. Jaeger (Nimrod) – Desmond Doyle
- Dora Penny (Dorabella) – Antoinette Sibley
- George Robertson Sinclair (G.R.S.) – Wayne Sleep
- Basil G. Nevinson (B.G.N.) – Leslie Edwards
- *** (Lady Mary Lygon) – Deanne Bergsma
- Schoolgirl – Patricia Linton
- Country girl – Lesley Collier
- Country boy – Donald Kirkpatrick
- Sailor girl – Christine Aitken
- Sailor boy – Frank Freeman
- Housekeeper – Julie Wood
- Gardener – Ronald Plaisted
- The carrier – Gary Sinclaire
- Country woman – Lois Strike
- Telegraph boy – John Haynes

Source:Royal Opera House performance database.

== Critical reception ==
In The Times, John Percival wrote, "There have been plenty of ballets about love, but friendship as a subject is rare, and Ashton finds rare and moving expression for it. … What a pleasure it is, after so many ballets about fairytale characters and melodramatic situations, to see credible, adult characters like these on the stage of the Opera House." In The Observer, Alexander Bland found the character of Elgar himself remained ill-defined, but thought the work ideal for "Ashton's delicate water-colour talent and his inimitable gift for inventing short flowing variations, and it is a fine vehicle for the smooth, soft Royal Ballet style."

One dissenting voice was that of Bernard Levin in The Times, who wrote that the choreography did not enhance one's appreciation of the characters depicted in the music, but impeded it: "it was like those television sports commentators who carefully tell us what we have just seen." In 2002, Joan Acocella wrote in The New Yorker of "a number of central-casting English eccentrics running around in tweeds and brandishing ear trumpets. But the center of the piece is Elgar, and Ashton has fleshed out his portrait. … No other ballet choreographer has examined normal emotions with such sophistication."

== Revivals ==
The ballet has been revived by the Royal Ballet in each decade since the premiere. As of 2020 the most recent Royal Ballet production was in December 2019 as part of a heritage program featuring Kenneth MacMillan's Concerto and Act III of Rudolf Nureyev's Raymonda. One of the performances was relayed in cinemas and later released on a DVD. This cast featured Laura Morera as the Lady Elgar, Christopher Saunders as Edward Elgar, Francesca Hayward as Dorabella and Matthew Ball as Troyte.

Outside of The Royal Ballet and Birmingham Royal Ballet, the only other Ballet Company that has been given permission to perform Frederick Ashton's Enigma Variations is The Sarasota Ballet, which most recently performed the ballet in honor of the piece's 50th Anniversary in December 2018 alongside Frederick Ashton's Les Patineurs and George Balanchine's Diamonds.

== See also ==
- List of historical ballet characters

== Notes and references ==
Notes
