= Makhateli =

Makhateli is a surname. Notable people with the surname include:

- David Makhateli, Georgian ballet dancer
- Maia Makhateli, Georgian ballet dancer
