= Tamara Rojo =

Spanish ballet dancer, artistic director (born 1974)

Tamara Rojo CBE
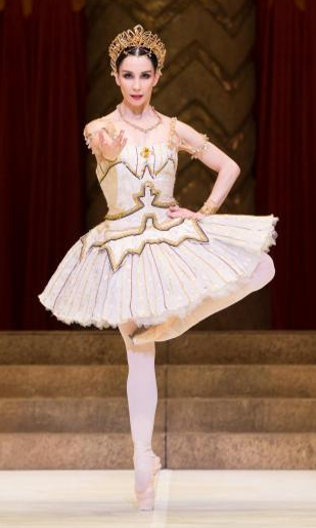
- Rojo as Raymonda, Festival de Granada, 2014
- Born: 17 May 1974 (age 52); Montreal, Quebec, Canada
- Education: Rey Juan Carlos University
- Occupations: Ballet dancer, director and choreographer
- Title: Artistic director, San Francisco Ballet
- Spouse: Isaac Hernández
- Children: 1
- Tamara Rojo's voice from the BBC programme Front Row, 23 April 2013
- Website: www.tamara-rojo.com

Tamara Rojo CBE (born 17 May 1974) is a Spanish ballet dancer. She was the English National Ballet's artistic director and a lead principal dancer with the company between 2012 and 2022. She was previously a principal dancer with The Royal Ballet. She became the artistic director of San Francisco Ballet in late 2022.

== Early life and training ==
Rojo was born in Montreal, Quebec, Canada, to Spanish parents who returned with her to Spain when she was 4 months old. At the age of 5 she began dance classes in Madrid and became a full-time student age 11 at Madrid's Royal Professional Conservatory of Dance, Mariemma studying with Víctor Ullate and Karemia Moreno.

Though her parents were pleased at her developing balletic talent, they insisted Rojo also complete an academic education through evening classes she could attend after studio rehearsals. Having graduated from the Conservatory at 16, she completed her secondary studies over the next two years. She went on to complete further degrees including a bachelor of dance, master of scenic arts and a PhD in performing arts, becoming DA magna cum laude in 2016 from King Juan Carlos University.

== Career ==
Rojo began her professional career in 1991 with the Ballet de la Comunidad de Madrid, under the direction of Víctor Ullate. In 1994, she was awarded a gold medal at the Paris International Dance competition, together with a Special Jury Award from a panel including Natalia Makarova, Galina Samsova and Vladimir Vasiliev, three outstanding figures in the ballet world at that time.

=== Early career in Britain ===
In 1996 Galina Samsova, artistic director of Scottish Ballet, invited Rojo to join the company. There she performed principal roles in Swan Lake, The Nutcracker, La Sylphide and Cranko's Romeo and Juliet. Derek Deane, then English National Ballet artistic director, asked her to join ENB the following year. For her he created the roles of Juliet in "Romeo and Juliet" and Clara in "The Nutcracker" for which The Times named Rojo "Dance Revelation of the Year" in 1997. She also danced principal roles in Swan Lake, Paquita, Coppelia and Glen Tetley's The Sphinx.

=== Royal Ballet ===
Rojo approached Royal Ballet director Anthony Dowell in 2000 with a view to joining the company, and was invited to become a principal dancer when a contract became available later in the year. Over the next 12 years, she performed major roles in most of the company's repertoire including ballets choreographed by Kenneth MacMillan and Frederick Ashton, Dowell's Swan Lake, Makarova's La Bayadere, Rudolph Nureyev's Don Quixote, and Peter Wright 's The Nutcracker. She danced in the world premiere of Snow White, created for her by choreographer Ricardo Cué. The title role in Isadora was recreated for her by MacMillan's widow, the artist and set designer Deborah MacMillan, custodian of the late choreographer's ballets.

==== Major injuries ====
In 2000, Rojo was asked at short notice to replace the injured Royal Ballet principal Darcey Bussell in the title role in Giselle. Ignoring her own sprained ankle, Rojo learned the role in a fortnight and went on to receive rave reviews. In 2002, while dancing Clara in Nutcracker, Rojo began to tremble on stage. Sent to a private hospital after the performance, she learned her appendix had burst and was told to take six weeks off. However, she resumed dancing after only two, relapsed and returned to hospital. Rojo admitted some years later it was "completely wrong [to continue dancing while injured or ill] and I do not feel that anyone should do this. It really is not worth it."

In 2003, while preparing for the Royal Ballet's Australian tour, Rojo suffered an infected bunion so serious that her foot swelled to the size of a tennis ball. Doctors recommended surgery on her foot, a potentially career-ending operation. Months later, after countless hours of rehabilitation, she resumed dancing and said the injury changed her perspective on life, her body and dance. She felt that she valued each and every day more and learned that nothing in life should be taken for granted.

After this experience, she and her father developed a device to stretch pointe shoes in order to reduce pressure on bunions, and formed a company in 2017 to market it.

=== English National Ballet ===
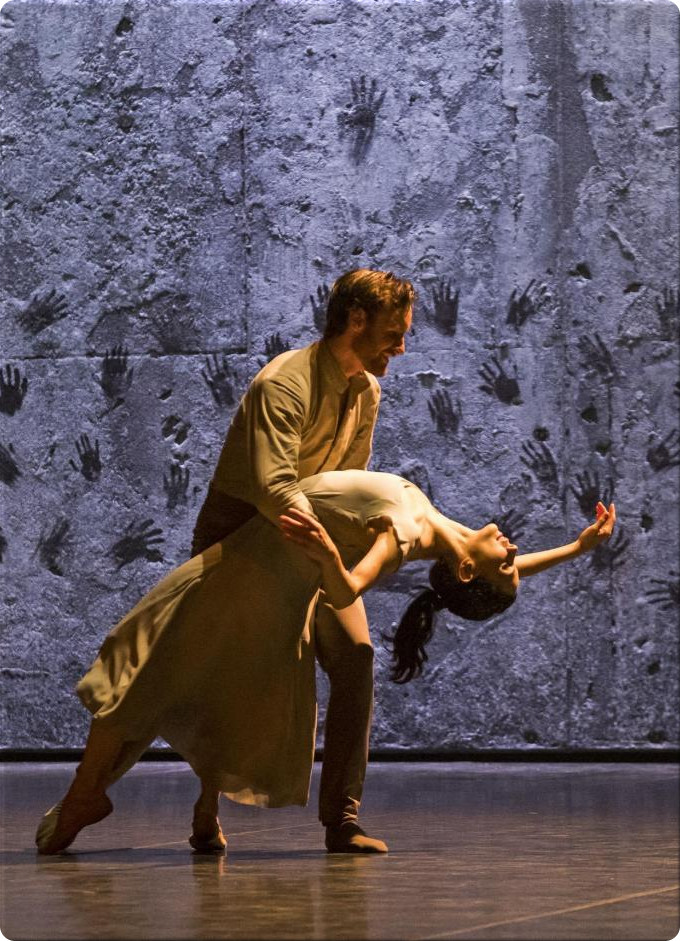
Rojo as Giselle in ENB's full length ballet Giselle choreographed by Akram Khan

In 2012, Rojo became the artistic director of English National Ballet, replacing Wayne Eagling.

Under her direction, the English National Ballet, for the first time in history, was invited to dance at the Paris Opera Palais Garnier. Appearing from 21 to 25 June 2016, ENB performed one of the most famous ballets in its repertoire: the Petipa and Sergeyev version of Le Corsaire in a revival by Anna-Marie Holmes.

In 2014, she presented a documentary entitled Good Swan, Bad Swan: Dancing Swan Lake for the BBC. She followed up with Giselle: Belle of the Ballet in 2017, which included the history of both the original production and the new ballet created for the ENB by Akram Khan. She had commissioned Khan to re-imagine the story: Khan won the Critics' Circle National Dance Awards 2017 for Best Classical Choreography, Alina Cojocaru won Outstanding Female Performance (Classical) as Giselle, and the company as a whole won an Olivier Award for Outstanding Achievement in Dance.

Rojo made her choreographic debut with a Florence Nightingale-inspired version of Raymonda, set during the Crimean War. It premiered in January 2022 at the London Coliseum.

=== San Francisco Ballet ===
In January 2022, it was announced that Rojo will become the artistic director of San Francisco Ballet at the end of the year, succeeding Helgi Tómasson. Upon taking the position, she became the first woman to serve as artistic director of the company.

== Repertoire ==
The following is a list of repertoire of Rojo's performance in various ballet companies.

Role	Choreographer	Company
Les Sylphides	Michel Fokine	B.Com.Madrid, Royal Ballet
Clara (The Nutcracker)	Wayne Eagling	English National Ballet
Ondine (Ondine)	Frederick Ashton	Royal Ballet
Theme and Variations	George Balanchine	B.Com.Madrid-Ullate, Royal Ballet
Allegro Brillante	George Balanchine	B.Com.Madrid-Ullate
Grossa Fuga	Hans van Manen	B.Com.Madrid-Ullate
In the Future	Glen Tetley	B.Com.Madrid-Ullate
Arraigo	Victor Ullate	B.Com.Madrid-Ullate
Simum	Victor Ullate	B.Com.Madrid-Ullate
Three Cornered Hat	Léonide/Massine	Bal.Opera de Nice
Le Beau Danube	Léonide Massine	Bal.Opera de Nice
Rite of Spring	Kenneth MacMillan	English National Ballet, Royal Ballet
Clara (The Nutcracker)	Derek Deane	English National Ballet
Paquita	Marius Petipa	English National Ballet
Juliet (Romeo and Juliet)	Derek Deane	English National Ballet
Cinderella (Cinderella)	Ben Stevenson	English National Ballet
Three Preludes	Hans van Manen	English National Ballet
Nascita di Orfeo	Luca Veggetti	E. P. Arena de Verona
Odette/Odile (Swan Lake)	Deane / Makarova / M.Mason / Nureyev	Kirov Ballet
Blancanieves	Ricardo Cué	Teatro Arriaga
Odette/Odile (Swan Lake)	Marius Petipa / Lev Ivanov	English National Ballet, Scottish Ballet
Consolations & Liebestraum	Christopher Bruce	ROH2
Tatiana (Onegin)	John Cranko	Royal Ballet
Cinderella (Cinderella)	Frederic Ashton	Royal Ballet
Marguerite (Marguerite and Armand)	Frederick Ashton	Royal Ballet
Juliet (Romeo and Juliet)	Kenneth MacMillan	Royal Ballet
Isadora	Kenneth MacMillan	Royal Ballet
Mary Vetsera (Mayerling)	Kenneth MacMillan	Royal Ballet
Manon (Manon)	Kenneth MacMillan	Royal Ballet
Song of the Earth	Kenneth MacMillan	Royal Ballet
Requiem	Kenneth MacMillan	Royal Ballet
Winter Dreams	Kenneth MacMillan	Royal Ballet
My Brother, My Sisters	Kenneth MacMillan	Royal Ballet
Symphony in C	George Balanchine	Royal Ballet
Jewels	George Balanchine	Royal Ballet
Tzigane	Balanchine	Royal Ballet
Dances at a Gathering	Jerome Robbins	Royal Ballet
Rushes	Wayne McGregor	Royal Ballet
Chroma	Wayne McGregor	Royal Ballet
Kitri (Don Quixote)	Vladimir Vasiliev	Tokyo Ballet
Sugar Plum Fairy (Nutcracker)	Peter Wright	Royal Ballet
Nikiya (La Bayadere)	Natalia Makarova	Royal Ballet
Juliet (Romeo and Juliet)	John Cranko	Scottish Ballet
La Sylphide	Bournonville/Sorella Englund / J.Covalli / J.Perrot	Scottish Ballet, Royal Ballet
Giselle (Giselle)	Petipa	Royal Ballet, Ullate, B.N.Cuba
Kitri (Don Quixote)	M. Petipa / R. Nureyev	Royal Ballet, Ballet alla Scala
Aurora (The Sleeping Beauty)	M. Petipa / Wright	Birmingham Royal Ballet
Medora (Le Corsaire)	A-M Holmes after M. Petipa and Sergeyev	English National Ballet
Frida Kahlo (Broken Wings)	Annabelle Lopez Ochoa	English National Ballet
Dust	Akram Khan	English National Ballet

== Awards ==
- Honoured by the South Bank Sky Arts Outstanding Achievement Award 2022, for her ten transformational years as artistic director of the English National Ballet.
- Gold Medal of the Academy of Performing Arts of Spain 2021.
- 2016 Commander of the Order of the British Empire (CBE) for services to ballet.
- 2013 Spanish-British Relationships of II Fundación Banco Santander Prize.
- 2012 The Gold Medal for Fine Arts 2012 of the John F. Kennedy Center for Performing Arts.
- 2011 Encomienda de número de Isabel la Católica.
- 2010 Laurence Olivier "Best New Dance Production" award for her collaboration with choreographer Kim Brandstrup in "Goldberg: The Brandstrup-Rojo Project."
- 2008 Prix Benois de la Danse
- 2008 Comunidad de Madrid's International Medal of the Arts
- 2007 City of Madrid's Interpretation Award
- 2005 Premio Principe de Asturias a las Artes
- 2004 Premio Positano "Leonid Massine"
- 2002 Medalla de Oro al Mérito en las Bellas Artes – Consejo de Ministros del Reino de España.
- 2002 Gold Medal of Fine Arts from King Juan Carlos
- 2002 London's Critic's Circle Dance Awards
- 2001 Sherringtons Awards Best Female Dancer of the Year
- 2000 Barclays Theatre Awards: Outstanding Achievement in Dance
- 1996 First prize of Italian Critics as Best Dancer of the Year
- 1994 Grand Prix Femme et Medaille Vermeille de la Ville de Paris (à l'unanimité) – Concours International de Danse de Paris

== Personal life ==
Rojo lives in Bloomsbury, London. Her husband is ballet dancer Isaac Hernández. Per an interview with Hernández in the New York Times, the couple have since separated. They have a son, born in 2021.
