= Aaron S. Watkin =

Canadian ballet dancer and director

- Born: 1969 or 1970 (age 54–55); Duncan, British Columbia, Canada
- Education: Canada's National Ballet School
- Occupations: ballet dancer; company director
- Career
- Current group: English National Ballet
- Former groups: Dresden Semperoper Ballett; National Ballet of Canada; Dutch National Ballet; Frankfurt Ballet; Spanish National Dance Company

Aaron S. Watkin (born 1969 or 1970) is a Canadian ballet company director and former dancer. He became the artistic director of the English National Ballet in 2023.

He began his dance career in 1988 at the National Ballet of Canada, and went on to perform at the English National Ballet, the Dutch National Ballet, the Frankfurt Ballet and the Spanish National Dance Company. Between 2006 and 2023, he served as the artistic director of Dresden Semperoper Ballett.

== Early life and training ==
Watkin was born and raised in Duncan, British Columbia. He began training at Canada's National Ballet School in 1983 and graduated in 1988. He received the first Erik Bruhn Memorial Award in 1988.

== Career ==
Watkin began dancing with the National Ballet of Canada in 1988, after graduating. He left Canada for Europe at age 20, and danced at English National Ballet, where he remained for two seasons, Dutch National Ballet, William Forsythe's Frankfurt Ballet and Nacho Duato's Spanish National Dance Company. In 2002, he became the associate artistic director at Victor Ullate Ballet. After he retired from performing, he worked as Forsythe's choreographic assistant and staged his works across the world, including at the Kirov Ballet and Paris Opera Ballet.

In 2006, Watkin became the artistic director of Dresden Semperoper Ballett, after staging a Forsythe program there the previous year. At the time, Watkin was relatively unknown, and was offered the position when then-Semperoper general director Gerd Uecker asked Forsythe's advice on a candidate who could shift the ballet company's direction from a classical company to one with a more diverse repertoire, and Forsythe recommended Watkin. In order to pursue his vision, he let go of 25 dancers, half of the company, and recruited new ones across Europe. He also appointed David Dawson as resident choreographer and acquired works by contemporary ballet choreographers such as Forsythe, Jiří Kylián, Mats Ek, Alexander Ekman and Stijn Celis, as well as older works by George Balanchine, Martha Graham, Pina Bausch and John Neumeier. Watkin also staged his own productions of classical ballets for the company, including Swan Lake, The Sleeping Beauty, The Nutcracker and Don Quixote.

In August 2022, Watkin was announced as the incoming artistic director of the English National Ballet the following year, three decades after he first danced there, succeeding Tamara Rojo. In March 2023, whilst still artistic director designate, he announced the programming his first season at the company. He officially took role in August 2023.
