= Caroline Mathilde =

Caroline Mathilde may refer to:

- Caroline Matilda of Great Britain (1751–1775)
- Princess Caroline-Mathilde of Denmark (1912–1995)
- Caroline Mathilde (ballet), a ballet to music by Sir Peter Maxwell Davies
