= The Prospect Before Us (ballet) =

- Choreographer: Ninette de Valois
- Music: William Boyce, arranged by Constant Lambert
- Premiere: 4 July 1940
- Original ballet company: Vic-Wells Ballet
- Design: Roger Furse
- Type: Comic ballet

The Prospect Before Us is a one act comic ballet in seven scenes, choreographed for the Vic-Wells Ballet by Ninette de Valois to music by William Boyce arranged by Constant Lambert.

== Overview ==
With its premiere in 1940, the first year of the war, de Valois set out to produce a light-hearted and jolly piece of escapism. Inspired by an eponymous 18th century engraving by Thomas Rowlandson, it has an intricate plot about the rivalry of two 18th-century theatrical managers who fight over a troupe of dancers that includes Didelot, Noverre, and Vestris. The final scene with Robert Helpmann as Mr. O'Reilly doing a "drunk dance" is well known.

== Premiere cast ==
- Robert Helpmann as Mr. O'Reilly of the Pantheon
- Claude Newman as Mr. Taylor of the King's Theatre
- Frederick Ashton as Monsieur Noverre
- Alan Carter as Monsieur Didelot
- John Hart as Monsieur Vestris
- John Field
- Deryk Mendel
- Michael Somes
- Leslie Edwards
- Pamela May

== See also ==
- List of historical ballet characters
