= Noelle Rose Andressen =

American ballet dancer and choreographer

- Born: December 30, 1968; New Jersey, U.S.
- Died: October 1, 2021 (aged 52); Los Angeles County, California, U.S.
- Other names: Noelle Andressen, Noelle Rose, Dance Warrior (nick name)
- Occupation(s): Ballet dancer, choreographer, filmmaker, author, model, actress
- Years active: 1989 - Current
- Notable work: Red Ribbons, STORM!, Shattered Innocence, ROSEWOOD, art of brokenness, RoseWater, Coeur de Verre, The Silent Rose and Fight for Love.

Noelle Rose Andressen (December 30, 1968 – October 1, 2021) was an American professional contemporary ballet dancer and choreographer who broke her silence about being sexually abused by creating her dance piece: "Red Ribbons". Andressen danced and choreographed for over 25 years with over 75 choreographic works that combined her Emmy Award-nominated skills to form her professional dance company Rubans Rouges Dance which produced events on both coasts. She was also art director and producer for the annual international "Awakenings & Beginnings International Dance Festival".

== History ==
Andressen was nominated for performing artist of the year in 2012 with a section from Red Ribbons called Coeur de Verre. Her choreography was considered for Emmy Awards. She was active in supporting women's and children's rights and the prevention of their abuse. She performed for the GLAAD Awards, ABC's Modern Family, and at renowned dance festivals globally. Andressen was also an actress known for various film works: Baby Doe's Heartbeat (2004), Profile (2008), Beauty from Ashes (2007), and Without Him...Entropy (2013) In 2018, she made the cover of Lois Greenfield's Dance Weingarten Calendar and featured for the month of January.

== Rubans Rouges Dance ==
In 2008, Andressen founded the contemporary ballet dance company Rubans Rouges Dance (French translation: Red Ribbons). The company performs internationally, presenting dance drama utilizing multimedia.

She was artistic director and lead female dancer for Rubans Rouges Dance in which she celebrates 10 years in 2019 as both classifications as the dance company also celebrates its 10th year with Tour Ten.

== Cancer ==
Andressen was a breast cancer survivor.

== Death ==
Andressen died in a traffic collision in Los Angeles on October 1, 2021, at the age of 52. Her husband and son were injured but survived. A man was later arrested for DUI in relation to the crash.

== Media ==
=== Articles ===
Noelle was featured in several articles in the Associated Press, LAWeekly, Celebrate Woman Today, Romper, The Roundup, and The Weekend Go Go.

=== Magazines ===
Andressen was also featured in articles in many newspapers and magazines such as Millennial Mom, The Roundup, and Valley Star.

=== Broadcasts ===
Andressen was also featured in many audio broadcasts such as Stand Out Women, Millennial Mom, and The Daily Author.

== Works ==
=== Choreography ===
- Rubans Rouges Dance performed the full edition of their repertory piece Red Ribbons, at a self-produced show called Red Ribbons and Memories. It was later further lengthened into a full two act dance-drama and musical production with dance, drama, music, singing, and theater which included the sections "Shattered Innocence" and "STORM!" Red Ribbons the dance and film "debuted in 2018 at the Ailey Citigroup Theater in Manhattan, New York City off Broadway in which Noelle Rose continued in the principal role dancing and singing.
- The Silent Rose
- Coeur de Verre
- Fight for Love

=== Films ===
- Actress, Baby Doe’s Heartbeat, Encopa Productions, 2004
- Actress/Dancer, Beauty from Ashes, Encopa Productions, 2007
- Actress/Dancer, Profile, Encopa Productions, 2008
- Dancer, Without Him, Entropy, 2013

=== Books ===
- Dance Warrior - From Cancer to Dancer
- Dance Warrior - Red Ribbons (Shattered Innocence)
- Dance Warrior Inspirations Strength of a Rose

== Performances ==
Andressen performed her pieces at

- “UNITY” Five Year Anniversary Show & Celebration
- San Pedro Tri-Arts Festival
- HHII Dance Festival
- Choreographer's Showcase
- So-Cal Dance Invitational
- UCLA 2016 Season of Performing Arts
- SFMAF

== Productions ==
=== Awakenings and Beginnings Dance Festival ===
- Awakenings and Beginnings Dance Festival 2016
- Awakenings and Beginnings Dance Festival 2017

=== Summer Showcases ===
Summer Showcase 1: Red Ribbons and Memories
