= Chabukiani–Balanchine Festival =

Ballet-festival contest held in Georgia

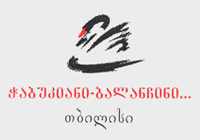
The emblem of the festival

The Chabukiani-Balanchine International Festival of Ballet Art — festival-contest, the first in history of the Georgian ballet, was founded by choreographer, People's Artist of Georgia Tamaz Vashakidze in 2001.

The author of the Festival logo was Zviad Tsikolia, and the author of the Grand Prix statuette was Gia Japaridze.

== I Festival (June 2001) ==
The first Festival was held in June 2001 and was dedicated to the 85th anniversary of the V. Chabukiani Tbilisi Ballet Art State School. The co-director and presenter of the Festival was the People's artist of Georgia Kote Makharadze.

Countries-participants of the I Festival: France, Russia, Japan, Azerbaijan, Lithuania, Albania, Georgia.

The Tbilisi Ballet Art State School named after genius creative personality Vakhtang Chabukiani is celebrating its eighty-fifth jubilee. It is remarkable, that the First “Chabukiani-Balanchine...” International Ballet Art Festival is dedicated to this event. If we may speak today about Georgian contribution in the treasury of the world ballet, then first of all it is the merit of the Vakhtang Chabukiani Tbilisi Ballet Art State School. I’m sure that the First “Chabukiani-Balanchine...” International Ballet Art Festival will write interesting pages in the history of world arts. (Sesili Gogiberidze, Georgian Minister of Culture. Speech at the Festival opening ceremony)

I am happy to congratulate the remarkable team of the Vakhtang Chabukiani Tbilisi Ballet Art State School with its 85th anniversary. The name of the great dancer that your School has is much obliging. And it’s joyful to realize that due to everyday efforts of the teachers the glory of Georgian choreography art does not fade away still nowadays. Your students shine not only on Georgian stage, but on many famed stages of the world, including the stages of the Bolshoi Theatre of Russia and Mariinsky Theatre. I wish you much success in this noble field. Today is your holiday. I am sure that the First “Chabukiani-Balanchine...” International Ballet Art Festival held in Tbilisi and dedicated to this memorable anniversary will bring you real joy of meeting with fine art." (M. Shvydkoy, Minister of Culture of the Russian Federation. Speech at the Festival opening ceremony)

=== Jury members ===
- Vera Tsignadze, People's Artist of Georgia – president of the jury
- Georgy Alexidze, People's Artist of Georgia
- Vyacheslav Gordeev, People's Artist of the USSR
- Eteri Gugushvili, Merited Art Worker of Georgia
- Tamaz Vashakidze, Merited Artist of Georgia
- Zurab Kikaleishvili, People's Artist of Georgia
- Maka Makharadze, Merited Artist of Georgia
- Liliana Mitaishvili, People's Artist of Georgia
- Irina Jandieri, People's Artist of Georgia
- Tsiskari Balanchivadze, Merited Artist of Georgia
- Anna Tsereteli, Merited Artist of Georgia
- Vitaly Akhundov, Merited Artist of Azerbaijan
- Leonid Nadirov, Rector of the St. Petersburg Ballet Art Academy

=== Grand Prix winners ===
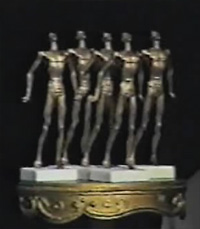
Grand Prix of the “Chabukiani-Balanchine...” International Festival of Ballet Art

- Soloist of the Bolshoi Theatre of Russia Morihiro Iwata
- Legend of the Georgian ballet, People's Artist of Georgia Vera Tsignadze
- Legend of the Georgian ballet, People's Artist of Georgia Zurab Kikaleishvili

=== Award and diploma winners ===
- Daniel Larios, France
- Leonid Flegmatov, Russia
- Nino Gogua, Georgia
- Gabriel Gogua, Georgia
- Maia Makhateli, Georgia
- Lasha Khozashvili, Georgia
- Temur Suluashvili, Georgia
- Olga Kuznetsova, Georgia
- Victoria Kikabidze, Georgia
- Maia Iluridze, Georgia
- Shorena Khaindrava, Georgia
- Nino Makhashvili, Georgia
- Anna Tsereteli, Georgia – in nomination “Best teacher-tutor”
- Larisa Chkhikvishvili, Georgia – in nomination “Best teacher-tutor”
- Rusudan Abashidze, Georgia – Ajaria – in nomination “Best teacher-tutor”
- Vasiko Abashidze, Georgia – Ajaria – in nomination “Best teacher-tutor”
- Eka Marshania, Georgia – in nomination “Best debut”
- Tamara Jashiashvili, Georgia – in nomination “Best debut”
- Giorgi Mshvenieradze, Georgia – in nomination “Best debut”
- Ladio Agaleu, Albania – in nomination “Best male dancer”
- Naira Ramazanova, Azerbaijan – in nomination “Best ballerina”
- Tamara Gibuti, Georgia – in nomination “Best ballerina”
- Morihiro Iwata, Japan-Russia – in nomination “Best production”
- Tamaz Vashakidze, Georgia – in nomination “Best production”
- Jurgita Dronina, Lithuania – Audience Choice Award
- Tamaz Vashakidze, Georgia – special Award of the Balanchine's Family
