= The Chairman Dances (ballet) =

The Chairman Dances is a ballet made by New York City Ballet ballet master in chief Peter Martins to John Adams' eponymous music from 1985. The music was originally written for Adams' opera, Nixon in China, but not used in production: the scene is that in which Mao Zedong dances with his future bride, movie star Chiang Ch'ing. The premiere took place on 14 May 1988, as part of City Ballet's American Music Festival at New York State Theater, Lincoln Center, with scenery and costumes by Rouben Ter-Arutunian, and lighting by Mark Stanley.

== Original cast ==
- Darci Kistler

== See also ==
- List of historical ballet characters
