= List of historical ballet characters =

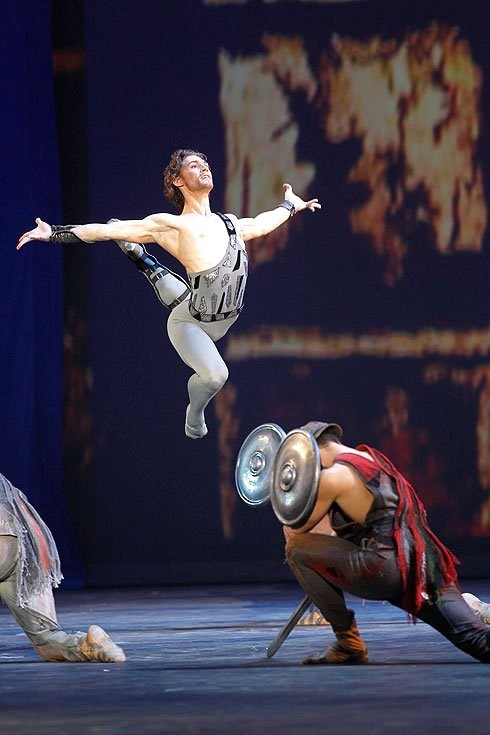
Spartacus who appears as a character in the 1958 ballet Spartacus by Aram Khachaturian

This is a list of historical figures who have been characters in ballets.

== List of historical figures ==
=== A ===
Hans Christian Andersen, Danish author

- Lera Auerbach: The Little Mermaid (as the Poet)

Anna Anderson, impostor of Grand Duchess Anastasia Nikolaevna of Russia

- Ballet to music by Bohuslav Martinů, Pyotr Ilyich Tchaikovsky: Anastasia

Andrew II of Hungary, King of Hungary

- Alexander Glazunov: Raymonda

=== B ===
Bahram V, King of Persia

- Gara Garayev: Seven Beauties

Giovanni Boldini, Italian genre and portrait painter

- Lorenzo Ferrero: Franca Florio, regina di Palermo

William H. Bonney (Billy the Kid), frontier outlaw in the American Old West

- Aaron Copland: Billy the Kid

Lizzie Borden, American woman who was acquitted for murder

- Morton Gould: Fall River Legend

=== C ===
Marie Anne de Cupis de Camargo, French/Belgian dancer

- Ludwig Minkus: Camargo

Caravaggio, Italian Baroque painter

- Ballet to music by Bruno Moretti based on Claudio Monteverdi: Caravaggio

Caroline Matilda of Great Britain, Queen of Denmark and Norway, the wife of Christian VII of Denmark

- Peter Maxwell Davies: Caroline Mathilde

Fanny Cerrito, Italian ballet dancer and choreographer

- Ballet to music by John Field: Pas des Déesses

Cleopatra, last ruler of Ptolemaic Egypt

- Anton Arensky et al.: Cleopatra

Marcus Licinius Crassus, Roman general and politician

- Aram Khachaturian: Spartacus

Cyrano de Bergerac, French dramatist

- Marius Constant: Cyrano de Bergerac

=== D ===
Hugh Despenser the Younger, royal chamberlain and a favourite of Edward II of England

- John McCabe: Edward II

Sergei Diaghilev, Russian art critic, ballet impresario, and founder of the Ballets Russes

- Ballet to music by Chopin, Schumann, Rimsky-Korsakow and Shostakovich: Nijinsky
- Ballet to a collage of existing music arranged by Bob Zimmerman: Nijinsky – Dancer, Clown, God

Charles Didelot, French dancer and choreographer

- Ballet to music by William Boyce, arranged by Constant Lambert: The Prospect Before Us

Isadora Duncan, American dancer

- Richard Rodney Bennett: Isadora

=== E ===
Edward II of England, King of England

- John McCabe: Edward II

Edward III of England, King of England

- John McCabe: Edward II

Caroline Alice Elgar, English author

- Ballet to music by Edward Elgar: Enigma Variations

Edward Elgar, English composer

- Ballet to music by Edward Elgar: Enigma Variations

Empress Elisabeth of Austria, Empress consort of Austria

- Ballet to music by Franz Liszt: Mayerling

Elizabeth I of England, Queen of England and Ireland

- Ballet to music by Anton Webern: Episodes

=== F ===
Franca Florio, Italian noblewoman, socialite and a prominent protagonist of the Belle Époque

- Lorenzo Ferrero: Franca Florio, regina di Palermo

Ignazio Florio Jr., Italian entrepreneur

- Lorenzo Ferrero: Franca Florio, regina di Palermo

Saint Francis of Assisi, founder of the Franciscans

- Paul Hindemith: Nobilissima Visione

Franz Joseph I of Austria, Emperor of Austria and King of Hungary

- Ballet to music by Franz Liszt: Mayerling

=== G ===
Piers Gaveston, 1st Earl of Cornwall, English nobleman

- John McCabe: Edward II

Archduchess Gisela of Austria, second daughter of Emperor Franz Joseph I of Austria

- Ballet to music by Franz Liszt: Mayerling

Lucile Grahn, Danish ballerina

- Ballet to music by John Field: Pas des Déesses

Alfred Grünfeld, court pianist of Emperor Franz Joseph I of Austria

- Ballet to music by Franz Liszt: Mayerling

=== H ===
James Hepburn, 4th Earl of Bothwell, Lord High Admiral of Scotland and 3rd husband of Mary, Queen of Scotland

- Ballet to music by Anton Webern: Episodes

Herodias, a princess of the Herodian Dynasty

- Paul Hindemith: Hérodiade

E. T. A. Hoffmann, German Romantic author

- Ballet to music by Jacques Offenbach: Tales of Hoffmann

=== I ===
Isabella of France, Queen of England as the wife of Edward II

- John McCabe: Edward II

Ivan the Terrible, Tsar of Russia

- Ballet to music by Sergei Prokofiev: Ivan the Terrible

=== J ===
August Jaeger, Anglo-German music publisher

- Ballet to music by Edward Elgar: Enigma Variations

Jiang Qing, Chinese figure, 4th wife of Mao Zedong

- John Adams: The Chairman Dances (as Chiang Ch'ing)

=== K ===
Frida Kahlo, Mexican painter

- Peter Salem: Broken Wings

Mathilde Kschessinska, Russian prima ballerina

- Ballet to music by Pyotr Ilyich Tchaikovsky and Bohuslav Martinů: Anastasia

Andrey Kurbsky, Russian figure, political opponent of Ivan the Terrible

- Ballet to music by Sergei Prokofiev: Ivan the Terrible

=== L ===
Countess Marie Larisch von Moennich, niece of Empress Elisabeth of Austria

- Ballet to music by Franz Liszt: Mayerling

Louis XVI, King of France

- Boris Asafyev: Flames of Paris

Princess Louise of Belgium, wife of Prince Philipp of Saxe-Coburg and Gotha

- Ballet to music by Franz Liszt: Mayerling

=== M ===
La Malinche, Aztec mistress of Hernán Cortés

- Norman Lloyd: La Malinche

Mao Zedong, Chinese leader

- John Adams: The Chairman Dances

Marie Antoinette, Queen of France and Navarre

- Boris Asafyev: Flames of Paris

Archduchess Marie Valerie of Austria, third daughter of Emperor Franz Joseph I of Austria

- Ballet to music by Franz Liszt: Mayerling

Mary, Queen of Scots, Queen of Scotland

- Ballet to music by Anton Webern: Episodes

Léonide Massine, Russian ballet dancer and choreographer

- Ballet to music by Chopin, Schumann, Rimsky-Korsakow and Shostakovich: Nijinsky

George "Bay" Middleton, English horseman

- Ballet to music by Franz Liszt: Mayerling

Roger Mortimer, 1st Earl of March, English nobleman

- John McCabe: Edward II

=== N ===
Vaslav Nijinsky, Russian ballet dancer and choreographer

- Ballet to music by Pierre Henry and Pyotr Ilyich Tchaikovsky: Nijinsky, clown de Dieu
- Ballet to music by Johann Sebastian Bach: Vaslav
- Ballet to music by Chopin, Schumann, Rimsky-Korsakow and Shostakovich: Nijinsky
- Ballet to a collage of existing music arranged by Bob Zimmerman: Nijinsky – Dancer, Clown, God

Jean-Georges Noverre, French dancer and ballet master

- Ballet to music by William Boyce, arranged by Constant Lambert: The Prospect Before Us

=== P ===
Niccolò Paganini, Italian violinist, violist, guitarist, and composer

- Ballet to music by Sergei Rachmaninoff: Paganini

Denis Papin, French physicist, mathematician and inventor

- Romualdo Marenco: Excelsior

Philippa of Hainault, Queen of England as the wife of King Edward III

- John McCabe: Edward II

Prince Philipp of Saxe-Coburg and Gotha, Prince of Saxe-Coburg and Gotha

- Ballet to music by Franz Liszt: Mayerling

=== R ===
Jacques Renaudin (Valentin le désossé), French can-can dancer

- Ballet to music by Emmanuel Chabrier: Bar aux Folies-Bergère

Arthur Rimbaud, French poet

- Ballet to music by Benjamin Britten: Illuminations

Diego Rivera, Mexican painter

- Peter Salem: Broken Wings

Anastasia Romanovna, Tsaritsa consort, first wife of Ivan the Terrible

- Ballet to music by Sergei Prokofiev: Ivan the Terrible

Salvator Rosa, Italian Baroque painter, poet, and printmaker

- Cesare Pugni: Catarina or La Fille du Bandit

Rudolf, Crown Prince of Austria, Crown Prince of Austria

- Ballet to music by Franz Liszt: Mayerling

=== S ===
Arthur Saint-Léon, French dancer and choreographer

- Ballet to music by John Field: Pas des Déesses

Katharina Schratt, Austrian actress

- Ballet to music by Franz Liszt: Mayerling

Clara Schumann, German musician

- Ballet to music by Robert Schumann: Robert Schumann's Davidsbündlertänze

Robert Schumann, German composer

- Ballet to music by Robert Schumann: Robert Schumann's Davidsbündlertänze

George Robertson Sinclair, English cathedral organist

- Ballet to music by Edward Elgar: Enigma Variations

Princess Sophie of Bavaria, Archduchess of Austria

- Ballet to music by Franz Liszt: Mayerling

Spartacus, Thracian gladiator

- Aram Khachaturian: Spartacus

Princess Stéphanie of Belgium, Crown Princess of Austria, Hungary and Bohemia

- Ballet to music by Franz Liszt: Mayerling

Henry Stuart, Lord Darnley, King consort of Scotland

- Ballet to music by Anton Webern: Episodes

=== T ===
Eduard Taaffe, 11th Viscount Taaffe, Austrian statesman

- Ballet to music by Franz Liszt: Mayerling

Marie Taglioni, Italian/Swedish ballet dancer

- Ballet to music by John Field: Pas des Déesses

Tancred, Prince of Galilee, Norman Crusade leader

- Ballet to music by Raffaello de Banfield: Le combat

=== V ===
Baroness Mary Vetsera, Crown Prince Rudolf of Austria's mistress

- Ballet to music by Franz Liszt: Mayerling

François Villon, French poet

- Robert Starer: Villon

Alessandro Volta, Italian physicist

- Romualdo Marenco: Excelsior

=== W ===
Louise Weber (La Goulue), French can-can dancer

- Ballet to music by Emmanuel Chabrier: Bar aux Folies-Bergère

=== Z ===
George Zorbas, Greek miner

- Ballet to music by Mikis Theodorakis: Zorba the Greek (ballet)

== See also ==
- List of ballets by title
- List of historical opera characters
