= Pirates of Penzance – The Ballet! =

Pirates of Penzance – The Ballet! is a comic ballet adapted from Gilbert and Sullivan's 1879 Savoy Opera The Pirates of Penzance. The plot is the same as in the opera, and the music is arrangements of Arthur Sullivan's original music for the opera.

== Scenario ==
After the music begins, an usher leads four people (who turn out to be opera singers) on stage as they loudly discuss mundane matters. As the audience begins showing its irritation, the singers are seated as an onstage audience. During the ballet, they sing part of the original score of Pirates, sometimes using new lyrics, as the dancers act out the story. In character as audience members, the singers interact with the pirates and police at times.

== Productions ==
The work, originally titled Pirates! The Ballet, was created for the Queensland Ballet. The choreographer was Daryl Gray, with orchestration by Henry Aronson and design by Christopher Smith. The world première took place at the Suncorp Theatre in Brisbane, Queensland, Australia, on 12 April 1991.

Between 1991 and 1995, Gray slightly restructured the ballet and added 4 singers with musical staging to its cast. The Queensland Ballet performed the revised work in 1996, following which the company took it on an extended tour to the United States presented by Columbia Artists Management. Gray largely re-choreographed the work for Ballet San Jose for a 2004 revival and retitled Pirates of Penzance – The Ballet!. In 2008, Orlando Ballet, under the direction of Bruce Marks, toured the ballet in Florida. It was again revived in November 2009 at Ballet San Jose. The San Francisco Chronicle reviewer wrote of the revival, "the show is a perpetual motion machine. ... Ebullient, athletic, bright as a picture book and blurrily overstuffed, Ballet San Jose's Pirates of Penzance is a crowd pleaser by default. With all that's happening onstage, how can you not be entertained?" However, "the libretto, score and theatrical elements tend to combine without much mutual enrichment." Rita Felciano of San Jose Mercury News called the production "delightfully wacky", writing: "this laugh-out-loud comedy is guaranteed to cure you of the vapors!"

The San Francisco Chronicle commented that the audience focus is split between the singers and the dancers, and that the ballet "proudly flies under the more-is-more flag. From the steps packed into each dancer's arsenal to dauntingly busy crowd scenes, the show is a perpetual motion machine. Now and then, as if they didn't have enough to do, the dancers break into tap, jazz, Broadway shimmies or moonwalk riffs, as if in tribute to the late Michael Jackson." The review added, "In the famous 'Major General' patter song, for example, the singers offer some of the deliciously impacted wordplay while the character ... runs through a whirling dumb show. Eventually, as if the lyrics were superfluous, the singers leave off". Nevertheless, according to a 2004 review by the same paper, "the audience happily allows itself to be taken prisoner."
