= Raymonda =

Ballet choreographed by Marius Petipa and with music by Alexander Glazunov

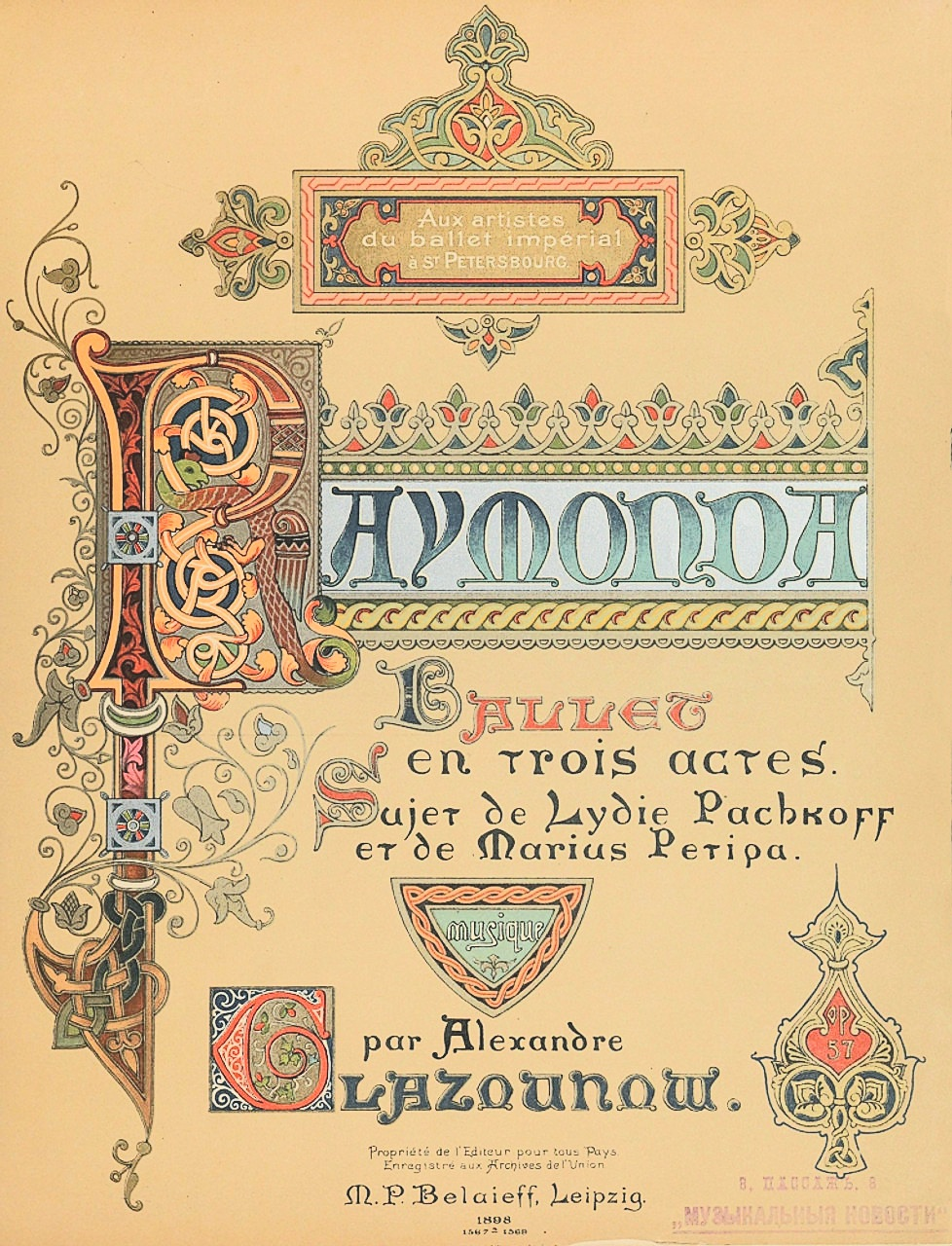
- Frontispiece of the piano score for Raymonda published by M.P. Belaieff, 1898.
- Choreographer: Marius Petipa
- Music: Alexander Glazunov
- Libretto: Countess Lidiya Pashkova
- Premiere: 19 January [O.S. 7 January] 1898; Imperial Mariinsky Theatre, Saint Petersburg, Russia
- Original ballet company: Imperial Ballet
- Design: O. Allegri, K. Ivanov, Pyotr Lambin
- Genre: Grand ballet

Raymonda (Russian: Раймонда) is a grand ballet in three acts, four scenes with an apotheosis, originally choreographed by Marius Petipa to the music of Alexander Glazunov (his opus 57) and libretto by Lydia Pashkova. Raymonda was created especially for the benefit performance of the prima ballerina Pierina Legnani, and first presented by the Imperial Ballet at the Imperial Mariinsky Theatre on 19 January [O.S. 7 January] 1898 in Saint Petersburg, Russia. Among the ballet's most celebrated passages is the Pas classique hongrois (a.k.a. Raymonda Pas de dix) from the third act, which is often performed independently.

Today Raymonda is performed by many ballet companies throughout the world with choreography that is derived primarily from the Kirov Ballet's 1948 revival as staged by Konstantin Sergeyev. Sergeyev greatly altered, and in some cases changed entirely, Marius Petipa's choreography, particularly in the dances for the corps de ballet. The choreography as revised by Sergeyev remains the traditional text for most of the world's productions of Raymonda, among them Rudolf Nureyev's version for the Paris Opéra Ballet and Anna-Marie Holmes's version for American Ballet Theatre, respectively.

The choreography and mise-en-scène of the Imperial Ballet's original production of Raymonda was recorded in 1905 in the method of Stapanov choreographic notation during rehearsals for performances starring the renowned Russian ballerina Olga Preobrajenskaya in the title role. Today, this notation is part of Harvard University's Sergeyev Collection.

In 2011 Sergei Vikharev utilized the notation to stage a new version of Raymonda for the Ballet of the Teatro alla Scala. The production also restored the original décor and costumes from designs prepared for the first production of 1898.

== History ==
=== Composition history ===
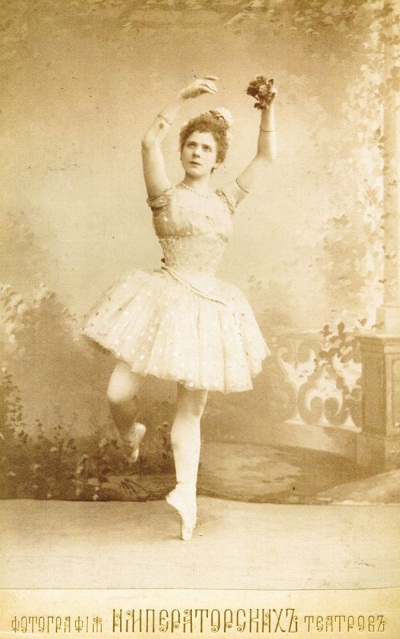
Pierina Legnani—creator of the title role—costumed for Act I of Raymonda. She is shown in a pose from the celebrated Entrée de Raymonde, in which the heroine collects a series of flowers placed on the floor. St. Petersburg, 1898

Raymonda was the creation of Marius Petipa (the renowned Maître de Ballet to the St. Petersburg Imperial Theatres), the composer Alexander Glazunov, the director of the St. Petersburg Imperial Theatres Ivan Vsevolozhsky, and the author and columnist Countess Lidiya Pashkova.

=== Performance history ===
==== St. Petersburg Premiere (World Premiere) ====
- Date: 19 January [O.S. 7 January] 1898
- Place: Mariinsky Theatre, St. Petersburg
- Ballet master: Marius Petipa
- Conductor: Riccardo Drigo
- Scene Designers: O. Allegri, K. Ivanov, Pyotr Lambin

==== Moscow Premiere ====
- Date: 5 February [O.S. 24 January] 1900
- Place: Bolshoi Theatre, Moscow
- Ballet master: Ivan Khlyustin, Aleksandr Gorsky
- Conductor: Andrey Arends
- Scene Designers: Karl Valts (Waltz), Lütke-Meyer, P. Isakov

==== 1908 production ====
Natalia Bessmertnova as Raymonda and Gediminas Taranda as Abderakhman in the Grand Pas d'action from the Bolshoi Ballet's production of the Petipa/Glazunov Raymonda. Moscow, 1980

- 1908, Moscow, Bolshoy Theatre, ballet master Gorsky, conductor Arends, décor by Konstantin Korovin

== Roles and original cast ==
Role	St. Petersburg 1898	Moscow 1900	Moscow 1908
Raymonda	Pierina Legnani	Adelaide Giuri	Yekaterina Geltser
Jean de Brienne	Sergey Legat	Mikhail Mordkin	Vasiliy Tikhomirov
Henrietta	Olga Preobrajenska		
Clémence	Klavdiya Kulichevskaya		
Béranger	Nikolai Legat		
Bernard	Georgy Kyaksht		
Abderakhman	Pavel Gerdt		M. Shchipachov
Countess Sybille	Giuseppina Cecchetti		

=== Revivals ===
The full-length Raymonda has been revived many times throughout its performance history, the most noted productions being staged by Mikhail Fokine for the Ballets Russes (1909); Anna Pavlova for her touring company (1914); George Balanchine and Alexandra Danilova for the Ballet Russe de Monte-Carlo (1946); Konstantin Sergeyev for the Kirov Ballet (1948); Rudolf Nureyev for American Ballet Theatre (1975) and for the Paris Opera Ballet (1983); Yuri Grigorovich for the Bolshoi Ballet (1984, DVD ArtHaus 100719); Anna-Marie Holmes (in a 2-act reduction) for the Finnish National Ballet (2004), a version which was then staged for American Ballet Theatre (2004) and the Dutch National Ballet (2005).

There have been many productions around the world of only extracts from the full-length Raymonda, for the most part taken from the Grand Pas Classique hongrois from the third act, which is considered to be among Marius Petipa's supreme masterpieces. The most noted of these productions have been staged by George Balanchine for the New York City Ballet (1955, 1961, 1973); Rudolf Nureyev for the Royal Ballet Touring Company (1964); and Mikhail Baryshnikov for American Ballet Theatre (1980, 1987).

In 2005 the Australian Ballet Company performed a modern version of Raymonda set in the 1950s, where Raymonda is a Hollywood star who has filmed her last film before marrying a European prince. It was choreographed by Stephen Baynes and bears no resemblance to the original ballet.

In January 2022, the English National Ballet presented a new version of this ballet choreographed by Tamara Rojo at the London Coliseum. Rojo has relocated the story to the 19th-century Crimean War, drawing on the figure of Florence Nightingale to create a Raymonda who redefines the role of women in wartime and society. This Raymonda is not content to stay at home and sew, so she hot-foots it from England across the Black Sea to Sevastopol. There, she tends to injured soldiers, and is reacquainted with John de Bryan, a family friend, who has joined the Light Brigade. As he leaves for battle, he persuades Raymonda to accept his hand in marriage. His friend, Abdur Rahman, an ally from the Ottoman army, promises to take care of Raymonda until de Bryan returns.

== Synopsis ==
=== Act I ===
Scene 1: Raymonda's feast

At the castle of Doris, preparations are under way for the celebrations of the young countess Raymonda's name day. Countess Sybille, her aunt, chides those who are present, including Raymonda's two friends Henrietta and Clémence, and the two troubadours Béranger and Bernard, for their idleness and their passion for dancing, telling them of the legendary White Lady, the protector of the castle, who warns the Doris household every time one of its members is in danger and casts punishment on those who do not fulfil their duties. The young people laugh at the countess's superstitions and continue to celebrate. The seneschal of the Doris castle announces the arrival of a messenger, sent by Raymonda's fiancé, the noble crusader knight, Jean de Brienne, bearing a letter for his beloved. Raymonda rejoices when she reads that King Andrew II of Hungary, for whom Jean de Brienne has fought, is returning home in triumph and Jean de Brienne will arrive at the Doris castle the next day for their wedding. Suddenly, the celebrations are interrupted when the seneschal announces the arrival of an uninvited Saracen knight, Abderakhman and his entourage, who have stopped at the castle seeking shelter for the night. Captivated by Raymonda's beauty, Abderakhman falls in love with her at once and resolves to do anything to win her. The party lasts late into the night and, left alone and exhausted by the day, Raymonda lies down on a couch and falls asleep. As she sleeps, she begins to dream that the White Lady appears illuminated by the moonlight and, with an imperious gesture, orders Raymonda to follow her.

Scene 2: The Visions

The White Lady, without making a sound, advances along the terrace. Raymonda follows her in a state of unconsciousness. At a signal from the White Lady, the garden is wrapped in mist. A moment later, the mist vanishes and Jean de Brienne appears. Overjoyed, Raymonda runs into his arms and they are surrounded by glory, knights and celestial maidens. The garden is illuminated by a fantastic light and Raymonda expresses her joy to the White Lady, who interrupts her enthusiasm with a vision of what awaits her. Raymonda wants to return to her fiancé, but instead, she finds Abderakhman, who has taken Jean de Brienne's place. Abderakhman declares his passionate love for her, but Raymonda, though confused and upset, is quick to reject him. Imps and elves appear from everywhere surrounding Raymonda, who begs the White Lady to save her and Abderakhman tries to take Raymonda by force. Raymonda cries out and falls to the ground in a faint. The frightful vision disappears along with the White Lady.

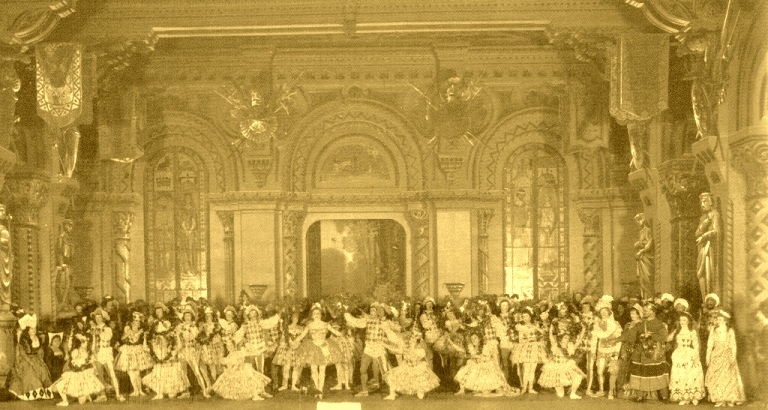
The stage of the Mariinsky Theatre with cast in act I of Raymonda. St. Petersburg, 1898.

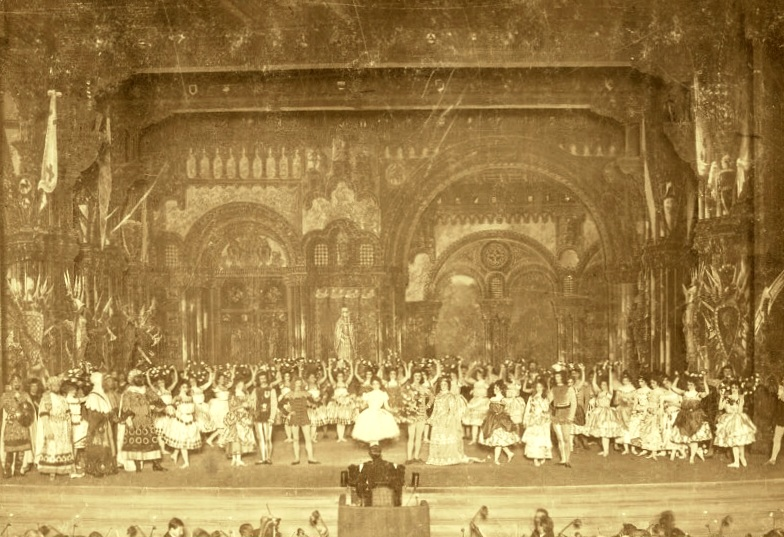
The stage of the Bolshoi Theatre with cast in act I of Raymonda. Moscow, 1900.

=== Act II ===
The Courtyard of the Castle

The feast in honour of Jean de Brienne's arrival is taking place. Raymonda welcomes her guests, but cannot hide her uneasiness caused by Jean de Brienne's delay. Abderakhman approaches her repeatedly and reveals his passion for her, but remembering the warnings of the White Lady, Raymonda rejects him with contempt. Abderakhman becomes even more insistent and realises the only way to possess Raymonda is by force. He calls his slaves to dance for her, after which he summons his cup bearers and they pour a potion into everyone's cup, causing all the guests to become drunk. Seizing his chance, Abderakhman grabs Raymonda in an attempt to abduct her, but luckily Jean de Brienne arrives just in time, accompanied by King Andrew II and his knights. Jean de Brienne saves Raymonda from the hands of the Saracens and tries to seize Abderakhman. The King commands the two rivals to put an end to the matter in a duel, during which the White Lady appears on the castle tower. Abderakhman is dazed and dies, slain by Jean de Brienne's sword. Raymonda joyfully embraces her fiancé and the two reaffirm their love as the King joins their hands.

=== Act III ===
The Wedding

Raymonda and Jean de Brienne are finally married and King Andrew II of Hungary gives the newly wedded couple his blessing. In his honour, everyone at court is dressed in Hungarian fashion and perform a range of Hungarian-style dances, ending in an Apotheosis where everyone comes together in a knightly tournament.

== Résumé of scenes and dances ==
Once the score for Raymonda was completed per Marius Petipa's meticulous instructions, Glazunov sent the manuscript to his publisher M.P. Belaieff. This occurred some time before Petipa was finished with the staging, a process which invariably required some editing and fine-tuning to be made to the score of any Grand ballet. Since Glazunov prematurely sent the score off for publication, any revisions Petipa required were not reflected in the score as issued by M.P. Belaieff. Even the titles of the various scenes and dances differ from those Petipa intended as reflected in the program for Pierina Legnani's benefit performance of 1898 and all subsequent performances at the Mariinsky Theatre. The most significant of these revisions are listed below.

Act I (scene 1) — La fête de Raymonde

- No. 01 Introduction
- No. 02 Jeux et danses —

—a Jeux
—b. La traditrice

- No. 03 Entrée de Raymonde
- No. 04 Scène
- interpolation: Entrée d'Abdéràme
- No. 05 Entrée des vassaux et des paysans
- No. 06 Pas d'ensemble —

—a. Valse provençale
—b. Pizzicato–Variation de Raymonde (Mlle. Legnani)
—c. Coda (reprise de la valse)

- No. 07 Départ des invités
- No. 08 La romanesque
- No. 09 "Une fantaisie"–Variation de Raymonde (Mlle. Legnani)
- No. 10 Clémence joue du luth
- No. 11 L'apparition de la Dame Blanche
- No. 12 Entr'acte symphonique

Act I (scene 2) — Visions

- No. 13 Scène du rêve
- No. 14 Grand pas d'action —

—a. Grand adage
—b. Valse fantastique
—c. Variation (Mlle. Rhykliakova)
—d. Variation (Mlle. Geltzer)
—e. Variation de Raymonde (cut by Petipa from the original production)
—interpolation: Variation pour Mlle. Legnani (arranged by Glazunov from the Valse of his 1894 Scènes de Ballet, op. 52)
f. Grande coda

- No. 16 Scène dramatique
- No. 17 Ronde des follets et des farfadets

Act I (scene 3) — L'aurore

- No. 18 Scène finale

Act II — Cour d'amour

- No. 19 Ouverture
- No. 20 Marche
- No. 21 Entrée d'Abdéràme
- No. 22 Pas d'action —

—a. Grand adage
—b. Variation d'Henriette (Mlle. Preobrajenskaya)
—c. Variation de Clémence (Mlle. Kulichevskaya)
—d. Variation de Béranger (Mons. Legat)
—e. Variation de Raymonde (Mlle. Legnani)
—f. Grande coda

- No. 23 Scène
- Grand divertissement —

—no.24 Pas des esclaves sarrasins
—no.25 Pas des mariscos
—no.26 Danse sarrasine
—no.27 Panadéros
—no.28 Les échansons
—no.29 Bacchanale

- No. 30 L'arrivée de Jean de Brienne et du Roi André II
- No. 31 Le combat et dénouement
- No. 32 Finale—Hymne

Act III — Le festival des noces

- No. 33 Entr'acte
- No. 34 Grand cortège hongrois
- No. 35 Rapsodie
- No. 36 Palotás
- interpolation: Mazurka (Insertion from Glazunov's 1894 Scènes de Ballet, op. 52)
- interpolation: Pas de caractère pour Mlle. Adelina Giuri (specially orchestrated by Glazunov from his piano piece Pas de caractère, Op. 68 for the Bolshoi Theatre production, 1905)
- No. 37 Pas classique hongrois —

—a. Entrée
—b. Grand adage
—c. Variation (Mlle. Johanssen)
—d. Variation (cut by Petipa from the original production)
—e. Variation pour quatre danseurs (Messrs. Legat II, Kyaksht, Legat III & Gorsky)
—f. Variation de Raymonde (Mlle. Legnani)
—interpolation: Variation (interpolation by Konstantin Sergeyev for his performance as Jean de Brienne, 1948. Originally the Variation de Béranger from the Pas d'action of Act II)
—g. Grande coda

- No. 38 Galop général
- No. 39 Apothéose – Tourney
