= The Wise Virgins =

The Wise Virgins is a one-act ballet based on the biblical Parable of the Ten Virgins. It was created in 1940 with choreography by Frederick Ashton, to a score of music by Johann Sebastian Bach orchestrated by William Walton.

== History ==
The music of the ballet was the first to be decided. Some years before, at an evening gathering in Cambridge with Boris Ord and Constant Lambert (musical director of the Sadler's Wells Ballet), those two musicians played some Bach at the piano. One of the pieces was "Sheep may safely graze" which comes from a secular cantata about hunting, Was mir behagt, ist nur die muntre Jagd, BWV 208. Ashton, wanting to use this music and believing it to be a religious subject, chose the parable of the wise and foolish virgins from Matthew 25. According to Michael Somes, it was a later meeting with Patrick Hadley where Hadley and Lambert played Bach's music which settled the sequence of musical numbers for the ballet. Walton was chosen by Ashton as the orchestrator in 1940. The movements were selected from Bach's cantatas and chorale preludes and orchestrated from piano transcriptions.

Designer Rex Whistler was chosen for his sympathy with Baroque art, from his studies in Rome. Ashton was also inspired by 18th century sculpture and architecture, and tried to depict with the dancers' bodies "the swirling, rich, elaborate contortions of the baroque."

The Wise Virgins was first performed on 24 April 1940 by the Vic Wells Company (The Royal Ballet) at Sadler's Wells Theatre, with Margot Fonteyn (the Bride), Michael Somes (the Bridegroom), Claude Newman (the Father), and Annabel Farjeon (the Mother) in the leading roles. It continued in the company's repertoire until 1944.

== Ballet Suite ==
The scoring is for 2 flutes (one doubling piccolo), 2 oboes, 2 clarinets, 2 bassoons, 4 horns, 2 trumpets, 3 trombones, harp, timpani and strings.

1. What God hath done, is rightly done (Cantata 99)
2. Lord, hear my longing (Chorale Prelude 'Herzlich tut mich')
3. See what His love can do (Cantata 85)
4. Ah! How ephemeral (Cantata 26)
5. Sheep may safely graze (Cantata 208)
6. Praise be to God (Cantata 129)

The suite was used for the ballet Cantus Firmus by the Ballet Vlaamderen, with choreography by Jeanne Brabants, in May 1970.

The suite has been recorded several times, including:

- His Master's Voice - Sadler's Wells Orchestra, conducted by William Walton (24 July 1940)
- Decca Records - London Philharmonic Orchestra at Kingsway Hall, conducted by Adrian Boult (19 October 1954)
- Capitol Records - Concert Arts Orchestra, conducted by Robert Irving (4 April 1961)
- Columbia Records - Cleveland Orchestra at the Masonic Auditorium in Cleveland, conducted by Louis Lane (3 April 1970)
- EMI Records - City of Birmingham Symphony Orchestra at Bedworth Civic Hall, conducted by Louis Frémaux (1–2 September 1976)
- Chandos Records - London Philharmonic Orchestra conducted by Bryden Thomson (March 1990)
- Naxos Records - English Northern Philharmonia, conducted by David Lloyd-Jones (11-12 July 2001)
