= Broken Wings (ballet) =

Ballet about Frida Kahlo

- Choreographer: Annabelle Lopez Ochoa
- Music: Peter Salem
- Premiere: 13 April 2016; Sadler's Wells Theatre
- Original ballet company: English National Ballet
- Characters: Frida Kahlo; Diego Rivera
- Design: Dieuweke van Reij
- Created for: Tamara Rojo; Irek Mukhamedov

Broken Wings is a one-act ballet about Mexican painter Frida Kahlo, choreographed by Annabelle Lopez Ochoa, dramaturged by Nancy Meckler and designed by Dieuweke van Reij. The music was composed by Peter Salem, and featured Mexican folk song "La Llorona" sung by Chavela Vargas. The ballet premiered on 13 April 2016 at the Sadler's Wells Theatre, danced by the English National Ballet, with Tamara Rojo as Kahlo and Irek Mukhamedov as Kahlo's husband, Diego Rivera. Lopez Ochoa then created a three-act version titled Frida for the Dutch National Ballet, premiered in 2020.

== Production ==
External videos
- Broken Wings: Frida and Diego (extract), YouTube video
- Broken Wings: Male Fridas (extract), YouTube video

Annabelle Lopez Ochoa was commissioned by English National Ballet to create a ballet as a part of She Said, an all-female choreographer triple bill, which was planned by artistic director Tamara Rojo, as she had never danced in piece by a woman. Lopez Ochoa said she was already interested in creating a ballet about Frida Kahlo prior to the invitation, and decided to use this opportunity to do so, but noted she intended the ballet to "tell the basic facts of Kahlo's life before letting her choreography loose into a more abstract, surreal treatment". She also brought in dramaturg Nancy Meckler, who had worked with Lopez Ochoa on another project. Rojo, who is also a lead principal dancer, was asked to dance Kahlo, as she is a "petite, Hispanic dancer". Irek Mukhamedov, then 56, was cast as Diego Rivera at Rojo's suggestion, as he was "old enough" but "fit enough". Kahlo's main costume in the ballet is inspired by her 1944 self-portrait, The Broken Column, and the dancer portraying Rivera wears a fat suit.

== Revivals ==
In 2019, Broken Wings was revived for another all-female choreographer mixed bill, She Persisted, with Katja Khaniukova taking over as Kahlo, and Mukhamedov reprising his role. Later that year, an excerpt of the ballet was performed at a gala in Guadalajara, Mexico, danced by Rojo and Yuri Possokhov. "La Llorona" was sung live by Geo Meneses. In 2020, in response to the impact of the COVID-19 coronavirus pandemic on the performing arts, the English National Ballet streamed the performance online. It was filmed during the show's original run, danced by Rojo and Mukhamedov.

== Frida ==
Dutch National Ballet's artistic director Ted Brandsen, who watched the original run of Broken Wings, said that he believed that Broken Wings "needed more space to breathe" but nevertheless was "impressed". Following the success of another piece by Lopez Ochoa in Amsterdam, Brandsen invited her to create a full-length version. The ballet premiered on 6 February 2020, with principal dancers Maia Makhateli and James Stout as Kahlo and Rivera respectively.

This ballet kept 25 minutes from Broken Wings, revised 13 minutes, and the rest of the piece was filled by new choreography. This version also used original music by Peter Salem, and two other songs, "Que te vaya bonito" and "Noches de Ahuatepec" were also used in addition to "La Llorona". Dramaturg Nancy Meckler and designer Dieuweke van Reij, both of whom had worked on Broken Wings, were also brought back for Frida.

== Awards and nominations ==
Year	Award	Category	Recipients and nominees	Result	Ref.
2016	Critics Circle National Dance Awards	Best Classical Choreography	Annabelle Lopez Ochoa	Nominated	
2016	Critics Circle National Dance Awards	Best Female Performance (Classical)	Tamara Rojo	Nominated	
2016	Critics Circle National Dance Awards	Best Male Performance (Classical)	Irek Mukhamedov	Nominated	
2019	Critics Circle National Dance Awards	Best Female Performance (Classical)	Katja Khaniukova	Won	

== See also ==
- List of historical ballet characters
