= Nobilissima Visione =

Ballet by Paul Hindemith

Nobilissima visione (The Noblest Vision) is a 50-minute ballet (or, more precisely, a "dance legend") in six scenes by Paul Hindemith, originally choreographed by Léonide Massine for the Ballet Russe de Monte Carlo. The libretto by Hindemith and Massine depicts episodes from the life of Saint Francis of Assisi. The work was completed in February 1938 and premiered at Theatre Royal, Drury Lane in London on 21 July 1938, with sets and costumes by Pavel Tchelitchew and under the baton of the composer. He led one performance of the new ballet at the Metropolitan Opera House in New York (for which the title was temporarily altered to Saint Francis) on 14 October of the same year.

After the ballet premiere, Hindemith extracted a 20-minute orchestral suite (retaining the Nobilissima visione name) in three movements, using five of the original eleven movements:

1. Introduction and Rondo
2. March and Pastorale
3. Passacaglia

The first performance of the suite in Venice was at Teatro La Fenice on 13 September 1938 and has become a regularly programmed orchestral work. Though the ballet was originally scored for a small orchestra, the suite was for a full symphony orchestra from the outset. The suite does not attempt to follow the action of the ballet, instead Hindemith extracted only those portions of the score which he felt would be most effective in the concert hall. Hindemith himself conducted the Philharmonia Orchestra in a 21 November 1956 stereophonic recording of the suite, which was released by EMI.

== See also ==
- List of historical ballet characters
