= Deanne Bergsma =

South African ballet dancer

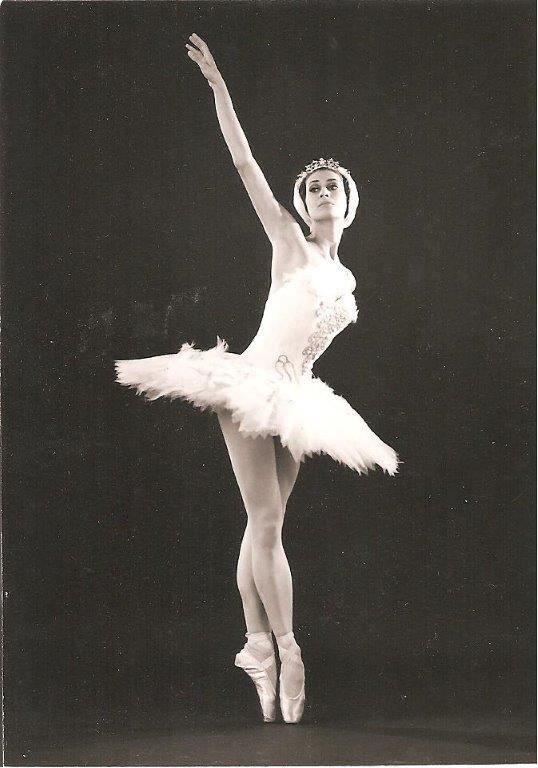
- Bergsma as Odette in Swan Lake
- Born: 16 April 1941 (age 85); Harrismith, South Africa
- Spouse: Keith Grant
- Children: 2
- Career
- Dances: Ballet

Deanne Bergsma (born 16 April 1941) is a South African ballerina, who made her career in the Royal Ballet at Covent Garden. She was born in 1941 and showed early promise as a dancer, She first came to London in 1957 to take up a place in the Royal Ballet School, having been talent-spotted by Claude Newman, former principal dancer and ballet-master of the Vic-Wells Ballet and now a visiting examiner of the Royal Academy of Dance. In two years she had graduated from the school and joined the Royal Ballet company in 1957. She climbed rapidly through the ranks to become a principal ballerina and appeared in a wide array of roles, both classical and contemporary, until her retirement in 1975. This eighteen-year career coincided with an exciting period for the Royal Ballet. Apart from the stream of new works from Ashton and Macmillan the company's resident director-choreographers, it was the heyday of the partnership of Margot Fonteyn and Rudolf Nureyev. The company was touring worldwide and was rarely out of the headlines.

== Early life ==
Born in Harrismith in 1941 in the Orange Free State. The daughter of a doctor and one of four children. In 1946 the family moved to Pretoria. By a happy chance the new family home had an adjoining studio which was used for dancing classes. Thus at an early age Deanne was introduced to ballet. Her development was supervised by one South Africa's most formidable dance teachers, Marjory Sturman. Deanne regularly took part in eisteddfods and school productions of the classics and was encouraged to take an RAD examinations. Hence she came to the notice of Claude Newman, as mentioned above, and made her way to London and the Royal Ballet School.

== Career ==
Deanne Bergsma's earliest opportunities to shine were in the classical repertoire, notably as Odette/Odile in Swan Lake, as the Lilac Fairy in Sleeping Beauty and as Myrtha, Queen of the Wilis, in Giselle. She was partnered variously by Donald MacLeary, Keith Rosson, Desmond Kelly and Rudolf Nureyev. She also made her mark in many ballets of Ashton and Balanchine. She had the benefit of personal coaching from Balanchine himself and from Bronislava Nijinska for the role of the Hostess in one of her best-known ballets, Les Biches. A new dimension was added to Bergsma's repertory and reputation in 1970, when the American choreographer Glen Tetley chose her and Desmond Kelly to create the leading roles in his new ballet Field Figures. Two years later Rudolf Nureyev and Bergsma danced together in filmed excerpts of this ballet. (See Films below).

She retired from the company in 1974, although she returned in 1988 to take the role of Berta in a revival of Ashton's Ondine.

Bergsma served on the judging panel for the Young British Dancer of the Year competition in 2011, and as a judge in the semi-finals of the Genée International Ballet Competition in 2010.

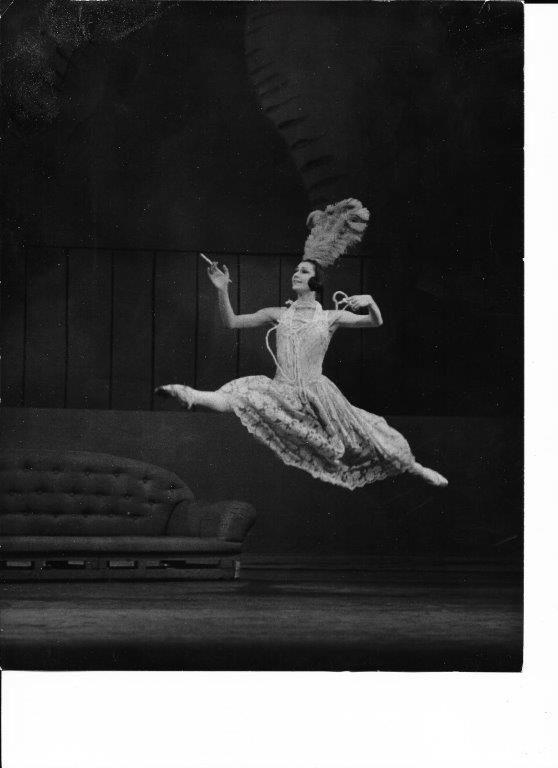
Deanne Bergsma as The Hostess in Les Biches

== Roles ==
Role	Ballet	Composer	Choreographer
Firebire / Tsarevna	The Firebird	Stravinsky, Igor	Fokine, Mikhail
Sylvia (Title Role)	Sylvia	Delibes, Léo	Ashton, Frederick
Lady Mary Lygon	Enigma	Elgar, Edward	Ashton, Frederick
The Lilac Fairy	Sleeping Beauty	Tchaikovsky, Pyotr Ilych	Petipa, Marius & Ashton, Frederick
Berta	Ondine	Werner-Henze, Hans	Ashton, Frederick
Lykanion	Daphnis and Chloe	Ravel, Maurice	Ashton, Frederick
Josephine	Wedding Bouquet	Berners, Lord Gerald Hugh Tyrwhitt-Wilson	Ashton, Frederick
The Polish Mother	Death in Venice	Britten, Benjamin	Ashton, Frederick
Winter Fairy	Cinderella	Prokofiev, Sergei	Ashton, Frederick
	Birthday Offering	Glazunov, Alexander	Ashton, Frederick
	La Valse	Ravel, Maurice	Ashton, Frederick
Girl with the Fan	Lord of Burleigh*	Mendelssohn, Felix	Ashton, Frederick
Odette / Odile	Swan Lake	Tchaikovsky, Pyotr Ilyich	Petipa, Marius (and others)
Myrtha	Giselle	Adam, Theo	Petipa, Marius & Wright, Peter
Prayer	Coppelia	Delibes, Léo	Petipa, Marius & Cecchetti, Enrico
	Field Figures	Stockhausen, Karlheinz	Tetley, Glen
Raymonda (Title Role)	Raymonda	Glazunov, Alexander	Petipa, Marius & Nureyev, Rudolf
Variation	La Bayadere	Minkus, Ludwig	Petipa, Marius
Choleric	Four Temperaments	Hindemith, Paul	Balanchine, George
The Siren	Prodigal Son	Stravinsky, Igor	Balanchine, George
Terpsichore	Apollon Musagete	Stravinsky, Igor	Balanchine, George
Pas de Trois	Ballet Imperial	Tchaikovsky, Pyotr Ilyich	Balanchine, George
	Serenade	Tchaikovsky, Pyotr Ilyish	Balanchine, George
The Hostess	Les Biches	Poulenc, Francis	Nijinska, Bronislava
The Bride	Les Noces	Stravinsky, Igor	Nijinska, Bronislava
	Requiem Canticles	Stravinsky, Igor	Robbins, Jerome
Allegro	Concerto	Shostakovich, Dmitri	MacMillan, Kenneth
Chosen Maiden	Rite of Spring	Stravinsky, Igor	MacMillan, Kenneth
Queen of Hearts	Card Game	Stravinsky, Igor	Cranko, John
	Brandenburg	Bach, Johann Sebastian	Cranko, John
Black Queen	Checkmate	Bliss, Arthur	Valois, Dame Ninette de

*Lord of Burleigh is usually performed to an orchestrated version of Mendelssohns' Songs Without Words. But at a gala performance in the Maltings in 1970 Benjamin Britten accompanied Deanne Bergsma on stage at the piano.

== Operas ==
In the later years of her career at Covent Garden Bergsma made appearances in non-singing roles in opera productions. Benjamin Britten asked her to create the role of the Polish Mother in what was to be his last opera Death in Venice. This production, directed by Colin Graham, with set designs by John Piper, costumes by Charles Knode and choreography by Frederick Ashton, was premiered at the Maltings in Snape in 1973 and later performed at Covent Garden, at the Fenice Theatre in Venice and at the Theatre de la Monnaie in Brussels. At Covent Garden she also appeared in John Schlesinger's production of Offenbach's The Tales of Hoffmann in the non-singing role of Stella. In Anthony Besch's production of Mozart's La Clemenza di Tito she made a mime appearance as Titus's inamorata Berenice.

== Film ==
Film	Year	Director/Choreographer	Cast inc.	Notes
I am a Dancer	1972	Pierre Jourdan	Deanne Bergsma, Rudolph Nureyev	Scenes from various ballets including Glen Tetley's Field Figures
Death in Venice	1981	Tony Palmer	Robert Gard, John Shirley-Quirk, James Bowman, Deanne Bergsma and Vincent Redmon	Opera by Benjamin Britten, conducted by Steuart Bedford

== Post-retirement ==
After retiring in 1975 at Anthony Dowell's invitation she returned to Covent Garden as a guest artist in revivals of Ondine, The Firebird and as the Queen Mother in Dowell's production of Swan Lake. She also coached younger dancers in several of her former roles. She served for eight years as a member of the Royal Ballet's Board of Governors, which has oversight of the Royal Ballet companies in London and Birmingham and of both the junior and senior Royal Ballet schools. Until 2020 she served as a leading external examiner for the Royal Ballet schools.

== Personal life ==
In 1968 she married Keith Grant, then General Manager of both the Royal Opera Company and the Benjamin Britten's English Opera Group. They have a son and a daughter.
