= New Georgian Ballet =

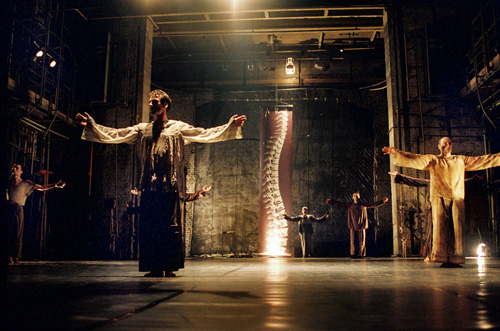
"New Georgian Ballet" theatre of modern dance. Scene from show

New Georgian Ballet (Georgian: ახალი ქართული ბალეტი; Russian: Нью Джорджиан Балет) is a non-repertory theatre of modern dance, founded by Georgian choreographer Tamaz Vashakidze in Tbilisi, Georgia, in 1993.

The Ballets Russes of Sergei Diaghilev was an aesthetic guideline for the newborn theatre. An organizing principle was non-repertory project.

== Overview ==
People’s Artist of Georgia Tamaz Vashakidze became its artistic director and tutors were People’s Artists of Georgia Vera Tsignadze and Zurab Kikaleishvili, and Merited Artist of Georgia Tsiskari Balanchivadze.

The first number which was produced in newborn theatre was a number “We begin” on medley from products of Bach, Beethoven, Mozart, Chopin, Wagner, Rimsky-Korsakov, Liszt (with sound of kremlin chimes at the beginning). The performers: artistic leader of “New Georgian Ballet” Tamaz Vashakidze and artist on light Vladislav Vlasov (who is technical director of Tovstonogov BDT today), artist on suit Eka Turmanidze. The first-night took place in 1993 in Tbilisi academic theatre of the opera and ballet, the first show outside Georgia — in the same year in St. Petersburg state conservatory.

The theatre’s debut took place in 1994 with the first performance of the production Class-Concert at the International Ballet Festival in Aspendos, Turkey. The debut featured ballet artists of the Tbilisi Z. Paliashvili State Academic Theatre of Opera and Ballet: M. Zurashvili, E. Bezirgani, Yu. Sorokin, K. Muhashavriya, L. Bakhtadze, L. Chkhikvishvili, M. Chikovani, K. Bakradze, L. Khozashvili, O. Kuznetsova, N. Ochiauri, C. Cholokashvili, P. Khelashvili, Amaglobeli, M. Alpaidze, N. Godziashvili, N. Lozovaya, I. Fomenko, N. Kupunia, M. Aleksidze, K. Kvitsiani, N. Dzhigauri, V. Tsignadze, G. Kukuladze, A. Tsereteli, P. Godziashvili, Z. Revazishvili, V. Vlasov. This was the first tour in Turkey through the whole history of Georgian ballet.

== Productions ==
From 1993 to 2008 director and choreography director of the theatre of modern dance "New Georgian Ballet" Tamaz Vashakidze produced 11 ballet performances:

- 1993: One-act performance "Loneliness to the music by Gustav Mahler
- 1993: Performance Class-Concert to the music by Pyotr Tchaikovsky, Gustav Mahler, Ludwig Minkus etc
- 1994: Variations to the theme by Alfred Schnittke
- 1995: Bolero to the music by Maurice Ravel
- 1996: Improvisations to the music by Ray Charles
- 1999: Suite Iavnana to the music by Pyotr Tchaikovsky
- 2002: One-act performance Prodigal Son to the music by Bidzina Kvernadze (co-directed by Kote Makharadze)
- 2004: Performance Mata Hari to the music by Sergei Prokofiev and Gogi Dzodzuashvili, and the songs by Edith Piaf
- 2004: Performance The Big Waltz to the music by Johann Strauss
- 2006: Polyphony to the music by Gogi Dzodzuashvili
- 2007: Performance The Knight — the first in Georgian history choreographic interpretation Shota Rustaveli's poem The Knight in Tiger Skin.

== Mata Hari ==
The year of 2004 was marked by production of the drama performance Mata Hari to the music by Sergei Prokofiev and Gogi Dzodzuashvili, as well as the songs by Edith Piaf. This production combined drama and classic ballet art.

Director-producer: Tamaz Vashakidze (the artistic director of “New Georgian Ballet” theatre of modern dance). Designers: Anka Kalatozashvili and Guga Kotetishvili. Starring: Mata Hari — winner of the International Ballet Artists Award, Georgian ballet star Lali Kandelaki. Other ballet performers: Irakli Shengelia, Michail Menabde, Irakli Bahtadze, Lasha Hozashvili. Drama artists: Nika Tavadze, Kaha Bakuradze, Zaal Chikobiva, Erik Bablidze.

== The Big Waltz ==
In 2004, the artistic director of “New Georgian Ballet” theatre of modern dance Tamaz Vashakidze produced the ballet The Big Waltz to the music by Johann Strauss. The first performance took place — for the first time ever! — in Balanchine’s home country on 22 January 2004 at the Tbilisi Z. Paliashvili State Academic Theatre of Opera and Ballet as part of “George Balanchine Memorial Night” and was dedicated to the 100th anniversary of his great compatriot, as well as to Vakhtang Chabukiani’s anniversary.

In 2005, by invitation of the Agency for Culture and Cinematography of Russia, the artistic director of “New Georgian Ballet” theatre Tamaz Vashakidze in co-operation with the “Russian Ballet” theatre (artistic director Vyacheslav Gordeev) produced the ballet “The Big Waltz”. Its world first night took place in Moscow in the Tchaikovsky Concert Hall.

In 2006, the first night of the ballet The Big Waltz took place at the Yekaterinburg State Academic Opera and Ballet Theatre.
