= Matz Skoog =

Swedish dancer and director (1957–2026)

Matz Skoog (10 April 1957 – 7 February 2026) was a Swedish ballet dancer and artistic director who was the artistic director of the Royal New Zealand Ballet from 1996 to 2001 and of the English National Ballet from 2001 to 2005.

== Life and career ==
Skoog was born in Stockholm on 10 April 1957. He trained with the Royal Swedish Ballet School.

He was married to Amanda, who was RNZB's managing director from 2007 to 2015, and they had two sons.

Skoog died from cancer on 7 February 2026, at the age of 69.
