= Edward II (ballet) =

Edward II is a ballet in two acts, with music by the English composer John McCabe.

Commissioned by Stuttgart Ballet, with a narrative conceived by choreographer David Bintley, the ballet largely follows the plot of Christopher Marlowe's play of the same name, rather than the life of the real Edward. Bintley incorporates elements of the 14th century satire Roman de Fauvel with the character of Edward, replacing that of the ass Fauvel, Piers Gaveston as the Fool, and Queen Isabella as the Virgin. As such, the narrative depicts the self-obsessed sexual relationships of the three main characters with the increasing civil unrest in the country as a backdrop.

Although McCabe's score uses motifs associated with music of medieval times, the treatment is modern, with the orchestra including a large battery of percussion as well as a celesta and electric guitar.

The ballet was premiered in Stuttgart on 15 April 1995. The UK première was given by the Birmingham Royal Ballet at the Birmingham Hippodrome on 9 October 1997. The score was recorded by Hyperion Records in 1999, with the Royal Ballet Sinfonia conducted by Barry Wordsworth.

== See also ==
- List of historical ballet characters
