= Maia Makhateli =

Georgian ballet dancer

- Born: November 5, 1985 (age 40); Tbilisi, Georgia
- Occupation: ballet dancer
- Children: 1
- Career
- Current group: Dutch National Ballet
- Former groups: Colorado Ballet; Birmingham Royal Ballet

Maia Makhateli (Georgian: მაია მახათელი; born November 5, 1985) is a Georgian ballet dancer. After terms with the Colorado Ballet and the Birmingham Royal Ballet, she joined the Dutch National Ballet in 2006, where she now is a principal dancer.

== Early life ==
Makhateli was born in Tbilisi, Georgia. Her parents, Nikoloz Makhateli and Marina Loladze, were dancers at the Georgian National Ballet. Her grandfather was a notable folk dancer and her grandmother was an opera singer. Her older brother David is also a dancer (formerly a principal with The Royal Ballet). Starting at age 9, she trained in ballet at the Vakhtang Chabukiani Choreographic Choreographic Institute in Tbilisi with Larisa Chkikvishvili.

== Career ==
When she was 15, her father was offered a job with the Sun Valley Ballet School in Ketchum, Idaho, US. Makhateli also attended the school, where she danced in The Nutcracker together with her brother David. Her parents now run the Makhateli Ballet Academy in Denver, Colorado. Maia trained in Colorado with German Zamuel and Valentina Mukhanova.

In 2002, she joined the Colorado Ballet. She made her full length principal role debut at age 19, dancing Aurora in The Sleeping Beauty. Hoping to dance for a bigger company and be closer to Europe, she joined the Birmingham Royal Ballet as a soloist in 2006. That year, paired with her brother, she danced Romeo and Juliet at the World International Ballet Festival in Tokyo, saying, "It's quite hard to be Juliet when Romeo is your brother." After finding England 'too cold and grey', she auditioned for the Dutch National Ballet in Amsterdam. She joined the DNB in 2007 as a grand sujet. Two years later, she became a soloist, and she was promoted to principal dancer in 2010. She has danced leading roles such as Aurora in The Sleeping Beauty and Odette/Odile in Swan Lake. In 2020, Makhateli originated the role of Frida Kahlo in Annabelle Lopez Ochoa's Frida.

She was a guest teacher at The Hague's 2014 Summerschool Den Haag program and a guest artist at the Oregon Ballet in Portland, Oregon.

== Personal life ==
When Makhateli was 40 weeks pregnant, a video was made of her balancing en pointe on one leg. This video was shared by American actress Jennifer Garner.

== Awards ==
Makhateli has received many awards for her dancing.

- 2020, Dance Europe Critic's Choice Dancer of the Year Award.
- 2019, Dance Europe Critic's Choice, Outstanding performance by a female dancer, twice.
- 2019, Prix Benois de la Danse, nomination.
- 2015, Alexandra Radius Award (Netherlands).
- 2011, Nina Ananiashvili & Gilbert Star Award (Georgia).
- 2002, Youth America Grand Prix (New York City, United States), finalist.
- 2002, Denver Ballet Guild's Young Dancers competition (United States), 1st.
- 2002, Youth America Grand Prix (Denver, United States), 2nd.
- 2001, Chabukiani-Balanchine Festival of Ballet, Award.
- 2001, International Ballet Festival (Kazan, Russia), 'diplomat'.
