= Frizak the Barber =

1879 comic ballet by Marius Petipa

Frizak the Barber (The Barber or Frizak or The Double Wedding) is a comic ballet in one act, with choreography by Marius Petipa and music adapted by Ludwig Minkus from themes derived from Italian opera (from the works of Giacomo Meyerbeer, Giuseppe Verdi, Vincenzo Bellini and Gioacchino Rossini).

The ballet was first presented by the Imperial Ballet on March 11/23 (Julian/Gregorian calendar dates) 1879 at the Imperial Bolshoi Kammeny Theatre in St. Petersburg, Russia.

The principal dancers at the première included Mariia Gorshenkova and Pavel Gerdt.

== Notes ==
- It has been conjectured by ballet historians that this work was a revival of a ballet of the same title originally produced by Petipa's father Jean for the Ballet du Théâtre de la Monnaie in Brussels, Belgium, where it was first performed on 19 February 1822.
