= Tamaz Vashakidze =

Artist, dancer, and choreographer

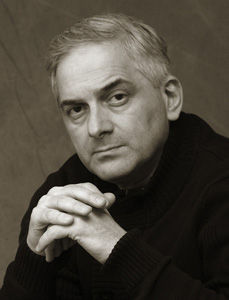
- Born: Tamaz Vashakidze; April 14, 1961; Tbilisi, Georgia
- Occupation: Choreographer

Tamaz Vashakidze (Georgian: თამაზ ვაშაკიძე; April 14, 1961, in Tbilisi) is an artist (People's Artist of Georgia), premier dancer of the State Georgian Ballet, choreographer, holder of the Order of Honor of Georgia (2001), founder and awardee of the Chabukiani-Balanchine International Festival of Ballet Art, founder of the New Georgian Ballet Theatre of Modern Dance, holder of Special Award of Balanchine's Family, and founder of the Foundation "Chabukiani-Balanchine".

== Biography ==
Tamaz Vashakidze was born in 1961 in Tbilisi, Georgia. In 1972, he entered Tbilisi Ballet Art State School. His teachers were Vivi Metreveli and Vakhtang Chabukiani."After graduating from the School in 1979, he was employed as the leading soloist at the Tbilisi Z. Paliashvili State Academic Theatre of Opera and Ballet."

In 1991 Vashakidze was awarded the title of People's Artist of Georgia.

From 1991 to 1993, Vashakidze was elected artistic director of the ballet company of the Tbilisi State Academic Opera and Ballet Theatre named after Paliashvili.

In 1993, he was appointed artistic director of the Tbilisi Choreographic School named after Chabukiani.

In 1993, Vashakidze founded a theatre of modern dance, New Georgian Ballet. The first number which was produced in newborn theatre was a number titled "We Begin"; a medley from products of Bach, Beethoven, Mozart, Chopin, Wagner, Rimsky-Korsakov, and Liszt, with the sound of kremlin chimes at the beginning. The performers included Vashakidze, artist on light Vladislav Vlasov and artist on suit Eka Turmanidze. The first night took place in 1993 in Tbilisi academic theatre of the opera and ballet. The first show outside Georgia in the same year in St. Petersburg state conservatory.

The theatre debut took place in 1994 with the first night of the Class-Concert performance at the International Ballet Festival in Aspendos, Turkey.

In 1995, he graduated from the St. Petersburg State Conservatoire in choreography. In 1999 Vashakidze produced the first Georgian performance in the manner of modern dance, Anbani. Later the same year, the ballet Anbani was presented at the International Modern Dance Festival in the French city of Montpellier. The French press tagged it as the "start of a new day".

In 2001, Vashakidze, in the function of the Director of the Tbilisi Ballet Art State School, had initiated the Chabuakiani-Balanchine International Ballet Art Festival. The first festival was dedicated to the 85th anniversary of the Tbilisi Ballet Art State School. The same year by Decree of the Georgian President Eduard Shevardnadze No. 892 from September 3, 2001, Tamaz Vashakidze was awarded with the Order of Honor for development and popularization of the Georgian ballet art and running the First International Ballet Art Festival Chabukiani-Balanchine.

In 2002, Vashakidze started the Foundation Chabukiani-Balanchine.

From 1993 to 2004 he was appointed artistic director of the Tbilisi Ballet Art State School by the Georgian Minister of Culture Dato Magradze. In 2001 Vashakidze was appointed director of the Tbilisi Ballet Art State School.

In 2005, by invitation of the Federal Agency for Culture and Cinematography of Russia, Vashakidze produced the ballet Big Waltz to music by Johann Strauss on the stage of the Concert Hall named after Tchaikovsky (Moscow), having become the first Georgian choreographer whose ballet first night took place on stage starring dancers from the Russian Ballet company. Following the first night of the production of Big Waltz in Moscow (1.5 years after Tamaz Vashakidze was fired from the Tbilisi Ballet Art School) he received an invitation to the General Prosecutor's Office in Georgia for testifying.

In September 2005, his name was put on the wanted list, although the Georgian authorities knew where he was. By the invitation of the Agency for Culture and Cinematography Vashakidze was in Ekaterinburg, where he negotiated the production of the Big Waltz ballet on the stage of the local Opera and Ballet Theatre (the production took place in 2006).

In 2006, Tamaz Vashakidze became the ballet master of the Ekaterinburg State Academic Opera and Ballet Theatre.

In 2007, after being arrested on Russian territory under the requisition of Georgian authorities, Tamaz Vashakidze asked the Russian Government for political asylum. In 2008 Russia granted his application and Vashakidze was given the status of political refugee. In 2008 the Ekaterinburg State Academic Opera and Ballet Theatre made Vashakidze a member of artistic management of the theatre as its ballet master.

In 2010, by invitation of the Russian State Circus Company Rosgostsirk, Vashakidze accepted the function of director-producer of Rosgostsirk.

On 27 May 2010, Tamaz Vashakidze became a member of the Theatre Union of Russian Federation.

== Parts In Ballet Performances ==
- Appassionata (Choreography: V. Chabukiani) — Youth
- Don Quixote (Choreography: V. Chabukiani) — Basil
- Don Quixote (Choreography: V. Chabukiani) — Torero
- The Sleeping Beauty (Choreography: V. Chabukiani) — Desiree
- Gorda (Choreography: V. Chabukiani) — Mamia
- The Vision Of Rose (Choreography: V. Chabukiani) — Youth
- Serenade (Choreography: G. Balanchine) — Youth
- Theme With Variations (Choreography: G. Balanchine) — Soloist
- Romeo And Juliet (Choreography: L. Lavrovsky) — Romeo
- Romeo And Juliet (Choreography: L. Lavrovsky) — Tybalt
- Porgy And Bess (Choreography: M. Lavrovsky) — Crown
- Pirosmani (Choreography: G. Alexidze) — Pirosmani
- Prodigal Son (Choreography: G. Alexidze) — Prodigal Son
- From Columbus To Broadway (Choreography: G. Alexidze) — Columbus
- Amazons (Choreography: G. Alexidze) — Chief
- Romeo And Juliet (Choreography: G. Alexidze) — Romeo
- Medea (Choreography: G. Alexidze) — Masque
- Seasons (Choreography: G. Alexidze) — Soloist
- One-Act Ballets (Choreography: G. Alexidze) — Soloist
- Francesco Da Rimini (Choreography: G. Alexidze) — Soloist
- One-Act Ballet (Choreography: G. Alexidze) — Centaur
- Mata Hari (Choreography: T. Vashakidze) — Officer
- Class-Concert (Choreography: T. Vashakidze) — Teacher

== Productions ==
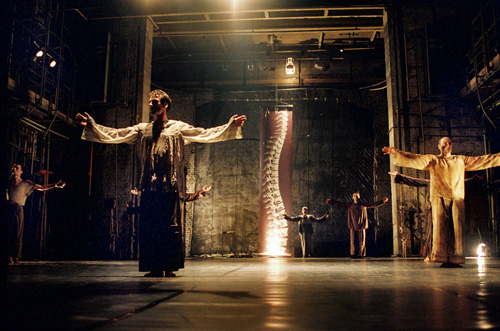
"New Georgian Ballet" theatre of modern dance. Scene from show

From 1993 to 2008 Tamaz Vashakidze produced 14 ballet performances as director and choreographer of the non-repertory theatre of modern dance New Georgian Ballet. Three of them (marked in the list with a *) were produced as part of side projects:

- 1993. One-act performance Loneliness to music by Gustav Mahler
- 1993. Performance Class-Concert to music by Pyotr Tchaikovsky, Gustav Mahler, Ludwig Minkus and others
- 1994. Variations to music by Alfred Schnittke
- 1995. Bolero to music by Maurice Ravel
- 1996. Improvisations to music by Ray Charles
- 1999. Suite Iavnana to music by Pyotr Tchaikovsky
- 1999. Anbani * to music by Gogi Dzodzuashvili
- 2000. The Morning Chant * to music by Gogi Dzodzuashvili
- 2002. Prodigal Son to music by Bidzina Kvernadze (co-directed by Kote Makharadze)
- 2004. Mata Hari to music by Sergei Prokofiev and Gogi Dzodzuashvili and songs by Edith Piaf
- 2004. The Big Waltz to music by Johann Strauss
- 2006. Polyphony to music by Gogi Dzodzuashvili
- 2007. The Knight — an interpretation of Shota Rustaveli's poem The Knight in Tiger Skin
- 2008. Shalom. The Return of the Prodigal Son * to music by Gustav Mahler and George Gershwin as well as national Georgian chants and songs by Frank Sinatra

== Academic Staging ==
Tamaz Vashakidze made over thirty productions in the leading academic theatres of Georgia in theatres named after Rustaveli, Marjanishvili, Griboyedov and others.

- In 1996 he was choreography director of the first international TV festival in Georgia Mana 96.
- In 2001 he produced the ballet The Nutcracker to music by Tchaikovsky for the ballet company Ballet RATI.
- In 2007, the performance Polyphony whose ballet master and producer was Tamaz Vashakidze and was awarded with theatre award named after Yivan Kyrla in nomination Grand Prix.
- In 2009 Vashakidze was choreographer and producer of the performance Khanuma in Sverdlovsk Academic Drama House (directed by Alexander Issakov and designed by Nino Kitia).

== Cinema and TV ==
Tamaz Vashakidze has acted as main characters in the following films:

- Odeon
- Ballet Master
- Night Dreams

Also, Tamaz Vashakidze acted in films:

- Ashik-Kerib
- Rivares
- Improvisation
