= Caroline Mathilde (ballet) =

Caroline Mathilde is a two-act ballet to music by Sir Peter Maxwell Davies. Its original choreographer was Flemming Flindt in 1991.

It tells the story of the eighteenth-century English princess Caroline Mathilde (sister of George III), who in 1766 was sent to Denmark aged 15 to be married to the 17-year-old schizophrenic Danish king, Christian VII. The ballet portrays her unhappy marriage, the king's growing madness and her fatal love-affair with Struensee, the king's influential physician, which ultimately leads to their arrest, his execution and her exile at the age of 20, separated from her two young children.

As with Davies' earlier ballet, Salome, it was a commission by the Royal Danish Ballet. It was first performed on 14 March 1991 at the Royal Danish Theatre, Copenhagen. The orchestra was conducted by Markus Lehtinen.

Davies prepared two concert suites, each based on an act of the ballet.

== See also ==
- List of historical ballet characters
