= David Makhateli =

Georgian retired ballet star

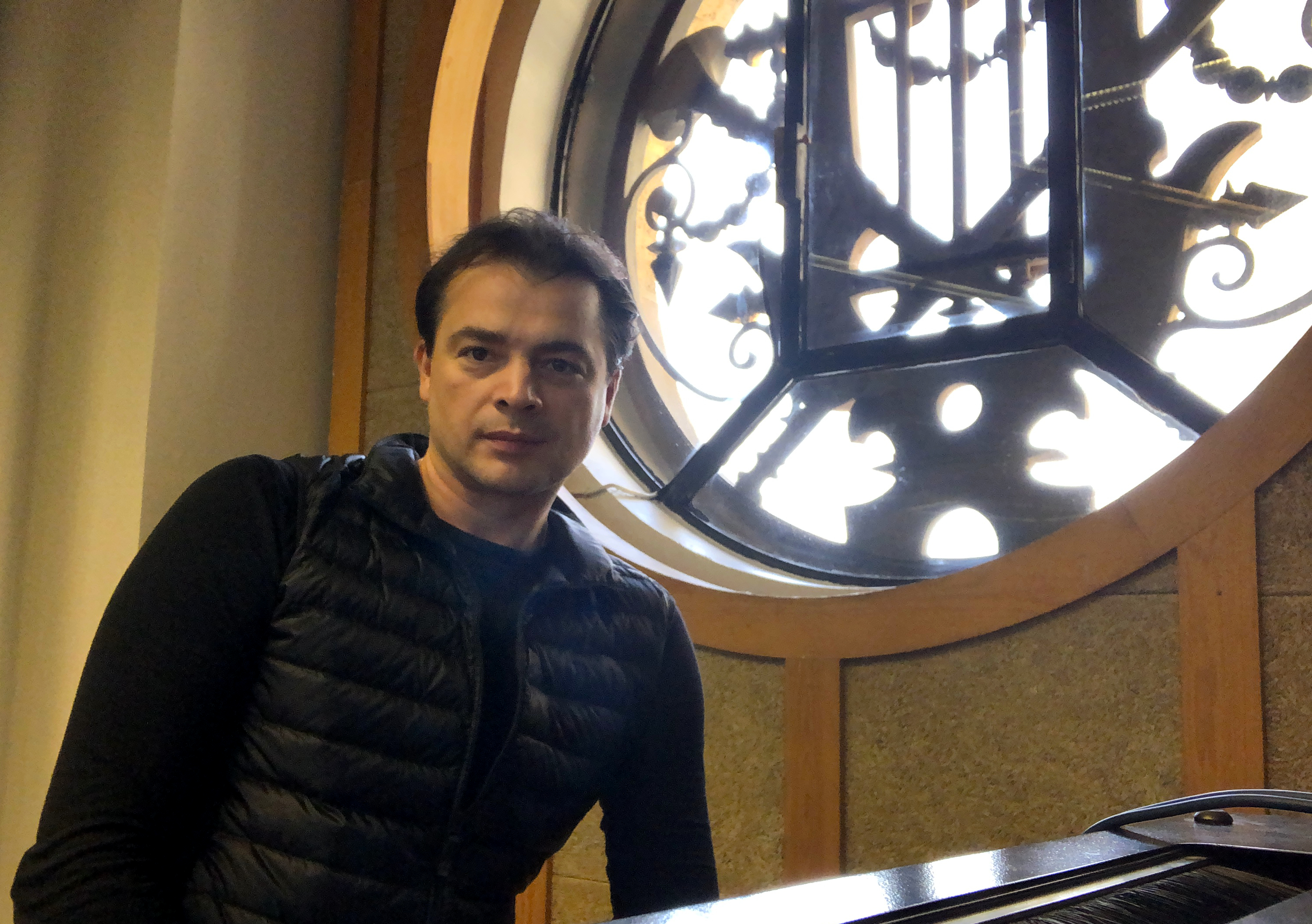
Photo: After class at the Paris Opera

David Makhateli (Georgian: დავით მახათელი) is a Georgian retired ballet dancer. He was a Principal Dancer of the Royal Ballet in London, England. David Makhateli is a founding director of D&D Art Productions and Grand Audition. He is also a guest teacher for the Royal Ballet, Dutch National Ballet, Paris Opera, Finnish National Ballet, Swedish Royal Ballet.

== Biography ==
David Makhateli was born in Tbilisi, Georgia and began training in classical ballet at the State Choreographic Institute in Tbilisi. He started training at the age of ten with his father Nikoloz Makhateli (Ex-Principal Dancer Tbilisi Opera Ballet Theatre and now Choreographer and Teacher) and later Levan Mkhitaryan, Boris Rakhmanin, Vakhtang Chabukiani and German Zamuel.

Makhateli is a winner of International Ballet Competitions in Lausanne (Switzerland) "Prix Espoir", Moscow Diaghilev International Ballet Competition (Russia) 1st Place Junior division and Diploma at the International Ballet Competition in Paris (France). He was later awarded a place to study professionally at the Royal Ballet School in London. After graduating from the school, he danced with a number of companies, including Birmingham Royal Ballet, Dutch National Ballet and companies in Europe, Japan, China, Central America and the United States. He has also taught at the Tbilisi State Choreographic Institute and National Ballet of Panama. In 1996, Makhateli was offered a contract to dance with Houston Ballet, one of the leading ballet companies in the United States. He was later promoted to the rank of Principal dancer in 2001. Whilst contracted to Houston Ballet, in 2003 Makhateli made a guest appearance with the Royal Ballet in the ballet Manon by Sir Kenneth MacMillan. He joined the Royal Ballet later the same year as a First Soloist, being promoted to Principal in 2007.

In February 2008 he was a recipient of a "Brilliance of the 21st Century" award with a fellow dancers at the Gala des Etoiles du XXIe Siecle – in New York, Lincoln Center.

Before joining The Royal Ballet in 2003 he was invited as a Guest Artist to dance the roles of Des Grieux opposite to Jamie Tapper's Manon and Romeo to Miyako Yoshida's Juliet in Kenneth MacMillan's Manon and Romeo and Juliet at the Royal Opera House, Covent Garden. Makhateli has performed for the Queen and the Royal family.

His repertory includes ballets such as:"Don Quixote", "Swan Lake", "Sleeping Beauty", Giselle, La Sylphide, The Nutcracker, Coppelia, La Bayadere, Sylvia, 'Cinderella, Cleopatra, Romeo and Juliet, Onegin, Manon, Le Corsaire, Esmeralda, Grand Pas Classique (Chor. Gzovsky), Thais (Chor. Ashton), Le Presage (Chor.Massine), Etudes (Chor. Lander), Miraculous Mandarine (Chor. Stevenson), Four Last Songs & Five Poems (Chor. Stevenson), In the Middle Somewhat Elevated (Chor. W. Forsyth) Without Words (Chor.N. Duato), Swan (Chor. Ricardo Cue).

After retiring from the Royal Ballet in 2012, Makhateli established D&D Art Productions (Dance Agency) and later co-founded Grand Audition (International Ballet Audition Platform for Multiple Ballet Companies) with his wife, Daria Makhateli, in 2016.

Makhateli has taught at the Royal Ballet, Paris Opera Ballet, Dutch National Ballet, Royal Swedish Ballet, Finnish National Ballet, Polish National Ballet, National Ballet of Panama, American Ballet Theatre Studio Company, and Slovenian National Ballet.

David Makhateli's younger sister, Maia, is a principal dancer with the Dutch National Ballet.

== Awards ==
- Prix de Lausanne, 1992
- International Diaghilev Ballet Competition, 1992
- Diploma de Concours International de Danse de Paris
