= Anna-Marie Holmes =

Canadian-born ballet dancer, educator and choreographer

Anna-Marie Holmes (born April 17, 1942) is a Canadian-born ballet dancer, educator and choreographer. Holmes received an Emmy Award in 2000 for her staging of Le Corsaire for PBS. She was the founder and co-artistic director for the International Academy of Dance Costa do Sol in Portugal.

== Early life and education ==
Holmes was born to George Ellerbeck and Maxine Botterill, as Anna-Marie Ellerbeck, in Mission City, British Columbia. She studied piano at the Royal Conservatory of Music in Toronto and ballet with Heino Heiden and Lydia Karpova in Vancouver, with Wynne Shaw in Victoria, with Audrey de Vos and Errol Addison in London, with Felia Doubrovska in New York City, with Natalia Dudinskaya in Leningrad and with Karel Shook in Amsterdam.

== Career ==
Holmes was a soloist with the Royal Winnipeg Ballet. During the 1960s she was the first North American dancer invited to perform as a guest with the Kirov Ballet. Holmes also performed with the London Festival Ballet, the Scottish Ballet, the Berlin State Opera, the Dutch National Ballet, the Chicago Ballet and Les Grands Ballets Canadiens. In 1985, after retiring from performing, she joined the Boston Ballet as ballet mistress and was named that company's artistic director in 1997. She also served as dean of faculty for the Boston Ballet's Center for Dance Education. She left the Boston Ballet in 2001. Holmes received an Emmy Award in 2000 for her staging of Le Corsaire for PBS.

Holmes has taught at The Royal Ballet in London, the Ballet du Capitole in Toulouse, the Norwegian National Opera and Ballet in Oslo and the Royal Danish Ballet in Copenhagen. Holmes was founder and co-artistic director for the International Academy of Dance Costa do Sol in Portugal. She has been artistic director for the school of the USA International Ballet Competition in Jackson, Mississippi. Holmes has also been artistic director for the Jacob's Pillow dance festival. In 2006, she was co-founder of Ballet Adriatico, a summer festival in Italy.

Holmes danced a pas de deux with her husband in Norman McLaren's award-winning film Ballet Adagio. The pair were also featured in Grant Munro's documentary Tour en l'air, which won first prize in its category at the American Film Festival.

Holmes is known for her restagings of classic ballets, particularly those from Russia, such as Swan Lake, Giselle, Don Quixote, The Sleeping Beauty, La Bayadère and The Nutcracker. Various choreographers including Agnes de Mille, Peter Darrell and Ruth Page have created works for her.

Holmes later became co-manager of Editions Anna-Marie Holmes, a publishing house for ballet music.

== Personal life ==
In 1960, she married dancer David Holmes. The couple had a daughter but later separated.
