= English National Ballet =

Classical ballet company

General information
- Name: English National Ballet
- Previous names: Festival Ballet; London Festival Ballet
- Year founded: 1950
- Founders: Dame Alicia Markova; Sir Anton Dolin
- Website: www.ballet.org.uk

Senior staff
- Executive director: Anu Giri

Artistic staff
- Artistic director: Aaron S. Watkin
- Music Ddrector: Maria Seletskaja

Other
- Official school: English National Ballet School
- Formation: Lead Principal; Principal; First Soloist; Soloist; First Artist; Artist

English National Ballet is a classical ballet company founded by Dame Alicia Markova and Sir Anton Dolin as London Festival Ballet and based in London, England. Along with The Royal Ballet, Birmingham Royal Ballet, Northern Ballet and Scottish Ballet, it is one of the five major ballet companies in Great Britain. English National Ballet is one of the foremost touring companies in Europe, performing in theatres throughout the UK as well as conducting international tours and performing at special events.

The company employs approximately 67 dancers and a symphony orchestra, the English National Ballet Philharmonic. In 1984, Peter Schaufuss became director and changed the name to English National Ballet and founded the school English National Ballet School, which is independent from the ballet company but joining the company premises in the new building. The company regularly performs seasons at the London Coliseum and has been noted for specially staged performances at the Royal Albert Hall. In 2014 English National Ballet became an Associate Company of Sadler's Wells.

== History ==
English National Ballet was founded in 1950 as Gala Performances of Ballet by the British dance couple, Alicia Markova and Anton Dolin. The Company later adopted the name Festival Ballet, then London Festival Ballet, and in June 1989, English National Ballet.

Markova and Dolin were leading stars of the Ballets Russes, one of the most influential ballet companies of the 20th century. After the death of its director Serge Diaghilev in 1929, the company was disbanded and in 1931, one of its dancers, Ninette de Valois, founded the Vic-Wells Ballet Company in London, with Markova and Dolin as Principal dancers, Markova becoming Prima Ballerina in 1933. Following the success of their performances as the Markova-Dolin Company, Markova and Dolin decided to start their own company with the sole objective of touring both nationally and internationally, bringing ballet to audiences who had not previously had the opportunity to experience the art form. Markova and Dolin left the Vic-Wells Ballet in 1935.

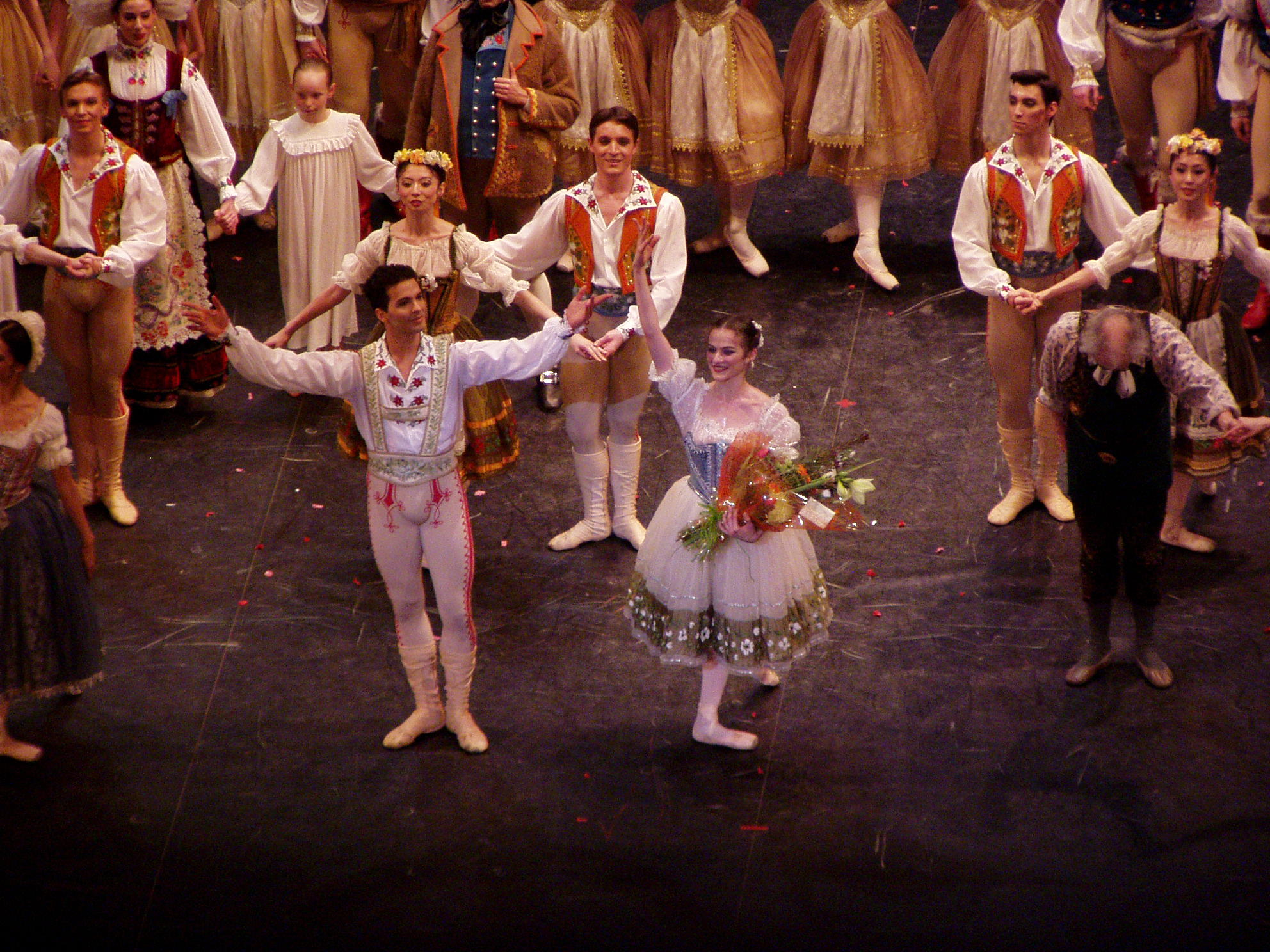
Elena Glurdjidze as Swanilda & Aroniel Vargas as Franz in the English National Ballet's production of Coppélia. Southampton's Mayflower Theatre. Also in the picture (bowing) is Michael Coleman as Dr. Coppelius.

London Festival Ballet was founded in 1950 with the financial backing of the Polish impresario Julian Braunsweg. The name was inspired by the then imminent Festival of Britain, however the company would later be renamed to today's English National Ballet. Dolin was the company's first artistic director and established the company as a touring group both nationally in the UK and Internationally, touring abroad for the first time in 1951. Dolin also introduced a number of educational programs in the early years, designed to make ballet accessible to new audiences. Dolin remained as artistic director until 1962, succeeded by John Gilpin, who was also principal dancer with the company from 1950 to 1960 and 1962 to 1971. The Company grew in size and status, undertaking extensive national and international tours, presenting a new generation of dancers—all while repeatedly facing bankruptcy. Braunsweg left in 1965 and Donald Albery took over until 1968, stabilising the budget with safer programming. Former Royal Ballet dancer Beryl Grey directed the company (now named London Festival Ballet) from 1968 to 1979, raising technical standards, touring widely and inviting prominent guest stars and choreographers including Leonide Massine and Rudolf Nureyev, who picked ballerina Eva Evdokimova to be his first Princess Aurora in his production of The Sleeping Beauty in 1975. In 1979 John Field became director of the company until 1984.

In 1984 Peter Schaufuss who had won both the Olivier and Evening Standard Awards as a dancer and for his production of La Sylphide with the company, became its director and revitalised the company. During his directorship he succeeded in changing the name to English National Ballet, founding the school, inviting Diana, Princess of Wales as patron and presenting many important choreographers ballets with the company for the first time such as Sir Frederick Ashton, Sir Kenneth MacMillan, Christopher Bruce, Michael Clarke, John Neumeier, George Balanchine, Alvin Ailey, Roland Petit, Maurice Bejart, and John Cranko. This period is considered by many the golden age where the company reached a new and higher level.

In 1990 Ivan Nagy became director (until 1993), Derek Deane (until 2001) and Matz Skoog (until 2006) and directed the company before Wayne Eagling, former head of Dutch National Ballet who took over in 2006. In April 2012, following the February sudden announcement of resignation by Eagling, principal dancer for The Royal Ballet Tamara Rojo was announced to become his successor at the end of the 2012 season, in August of that year.

In November 2019, Prince Andrew, who had served as Patron of the English National Ballet since 2001, resigned amid the Jeffrey Epstein scandal.

In January 2022, Rojo announced that she will leave the company at the end of the year to lead the San Francisco Ballet. Aaron S. Watkin, who performed with the company three decades prior, took over as artistic director in August 2023, after his appointment was announced in August 2022.

In June 2024, the company announced Queen Camilla as its new royal patron.

== People ==
Artistic directors:

- Sir Anton Dolin, 1950–1962
- John Gilpin, 1962–1968
- Dame Beryl Grey, 1968–1979
- John Field, 1979–1984
- Peter Schaufuss, 1984–1990
- Ivan Nagy, 1990–1993
- Derek Deane, 1993–2001
- Matz Skoog, 2001–2006
- Wayne Eagling, 2006–2012
- Tamara Rojo, 2012–2022
- Aaron S. Watkin, 2023–

== Dancers ==
The company's dancers are listed on the official website with photographs and linked biographies.

=== Lead principals ===
- Aitor Arrieta
- Gareth Haw
- Emma Hawes
- Shiori Kase
- Sangeun Lee
- Fernanda Oliveira

=== First soloists ===
- Ivana Bueno
- Julia Conway
- Katja Khaniukova
- Daniel McCormick
- Angela Nakaaki
- Rentaro Nakaaki
- Anna Nevzorova
- Haruhi Otani
- Fabian Reimair
- Ken Saruhashi
- Junor Souza
- James Streeter
- Emily Suzuki
- Lorenzo Trossello
- Erik Woolhouse

=== Soloists ===
- Alice Bellini
- Georgia Bould
- Henry Dowden
- Noam Durand
- Hatice Çağla Ertürk
- Minju Kang
- Swanice Luong
- Miguel Angel Maidana
- Skyler Martin
- Elvis Nudo
- Rodrigo Pinto
- Paulo Rodrigues
- Eric Snyder
- Francesca Velicu
- Rhys Antoni Yeomans

=== First Artists ===
- Matthew Astley
- Claire Barrett
- Isabelle Brouwers
- Emilia Cadorin
- Jung ah Choi
- Ashley Coupal
- Eireen Evrard
- Shunhei Fuchiyama
- Carolyne Galvao
- Giorgio Garrett
- Chloe Keneally
- Adriana Lizardi
- Jose María Lorca Menchón
- Thiago Silva
- Anri Sugiura
- Anna-Babette Winkler

=== Artists of the Company ===
- Zai Calliste
- Thalina Chaplin
- Anna Ciriano
- Lois Fraiz
- Taela Graff
- Tara Millard
- Nathaniel Ritter-Magot
- Martinho Santos
- William Simmons
- Lucinda Strachan
- Sacha Venkatsawmy
- Jakob Wheway Hughes

== Notable productions ==
Rudolf Nureyev's production of Romeo & Juliet was especially created for the English National Ballet (then the London Festival Ballet) in 1977 to celebrate the Queen's Silver Jubilee.

ENB gave the world premieres of Christopher Bruce's Land, The World Again, Swansong and Symphony in Three Movements.

English National Ballet commissioned Akram Khan, who had never worked with any ballet companies before, to create a one-act ballet about World War I. His ballet, titled Dust, premiered in 2014 and received critical praise. It was brought to Glastonbury Festival later that year, making it English National Ballet's debut at Glastonbury.

In 2016, in collaboration with the Manchester International Festival and Sadler's Wells, English National Ballet performed the world premiere of Akram Khan's critically acclaimed production Giselle, a choreographic mix of classical ballet, Kathak, and contemporary dance, at the Palace Theatre, Manchester.

In 2016, English National Ballet presented She Said, an all-female choreographer mixed bill including Annabelle Lopez Ochoa's Broken Wings, based on the life of artist Frida Kahlo.

English National Ballet also performs Derek Deane's Swan Lake in-the-round, featuring 60 swans, which has been filmed for BBC iPlayer at the Royal Albert Hall.
