= Derek Deane =

British dancer and choreographer

Derek Deane OBE (born 18 June 1953) is a British dancer and choreographer.

== Biography ==
Derek Deane was raised in Redruth, Cornwall and trained in the Royal Ballet School. As a dancer, he eventually became a Principal Dancer with The Royal Ballet, later retiring from the stage and working as Deputy Artistic Director and Resident Choreographer at Teatro dell'Opera di Roma and Artistic Director of English National Ballet (1993–2001). He was awarded the OBE (Officer of the Order of the British Empire) in the 2000 Queen's Birthday Honours for his services to dance as artistic director of the English National Ballet.

== Dance career ==
After his training at The Royal Ballet School, Derek Deane went on to join The Royal Ballet in 1972. Deane was promoted to Soloist in 1977, Principal Dancer in 1980 and then to Senior Principal Dancer in 1982. There, Deane danced some of ballet's most memorable roles, including Prince in Swan Lake; Romeo, Benvolio, and Tybalt in Romeo and Juliet; and Prince Rudolf in Mayerling. Deane worked with some of the era's most respected choreographers, including Kenneth MacMillan, Frederick Ashton, George Balanchine, Hans van Manen, John Neumeier, Glen Tetley, Rudolf Nureyev, Peter Wright, and David Bintley.

== Post Dance ==
After retiring from the stage, he went on to become the resident choreographer and Assistant to the Director of Teatro Del Opera Di Roma in 1990, before rising to Artistic Director of English National Ballet in 1993.

Ballets Deane has created for English National Ballet include, Giselle, Alice in Wonderland, Swan Lake, The Sleeping Beauty, Paquita, Strictly Gershwin and Romeo and Juliet. Many of these works Deane has re-created for the "in the round" productions for the Royal Albert Hall, including Swan Lake, seen by over 500,000 people worldwide. Deane has twice been nominated for Laurence Olivier Awards.

Other projects have included Hamlet (Shanghai Ballet Company), Swan Lake (English National Ballet) and The Lady of the Camellias (Teatro San Carlo, Naples), as well as Strictly Gershwin with Queensland Ballet and Tulsa Ballet.
