= Narrative ballet =

Type of dance

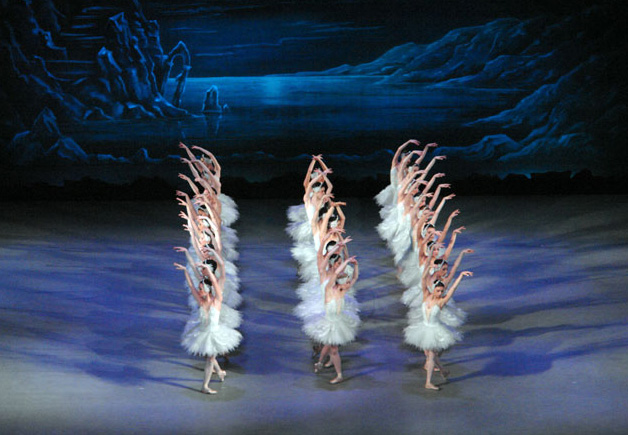
Scene from the ballet Swan Lake

A narrative ballet, also known as classical ballet or story ballet, is a form of ballet that has a plot and characters. It is typically a production with full sets and costumes. It was an invention of the eighteenth century.

Most romantic and classical ballets of the 19th century are narrative ballets. Among the most popular are Swan Lake, The Sleeping Beauty, and Cinderella. For such works, it is common for ballet directors to create their own choreography, while maintaining the plot and music used by the original 19th-century choreographer. Kenneth MacMillan and Frederick Ashton were neoclassical ballet choreographers who created original narrative ballets in the 20th century.

Plots frequently revolve around intense love, expression, fantasy, and tragedy. The most popular classic ballets are based on fairytales and magical myths.

For example, in Swan Lake, the main character Odette is put under a spell by an evil sorcerer who turns her into swan until she recovers her human form at midnight. The spell can only be broken by true love from a man who has not promised his heart to another. She meets a prince and they both fall in love. In the end, the prince is tricked by the evil sorcerer to propose to his daughter. Destined to be a swan forever, Odette plunges herself into the lake from despair. The prince followers her and they are united for eternity in death.

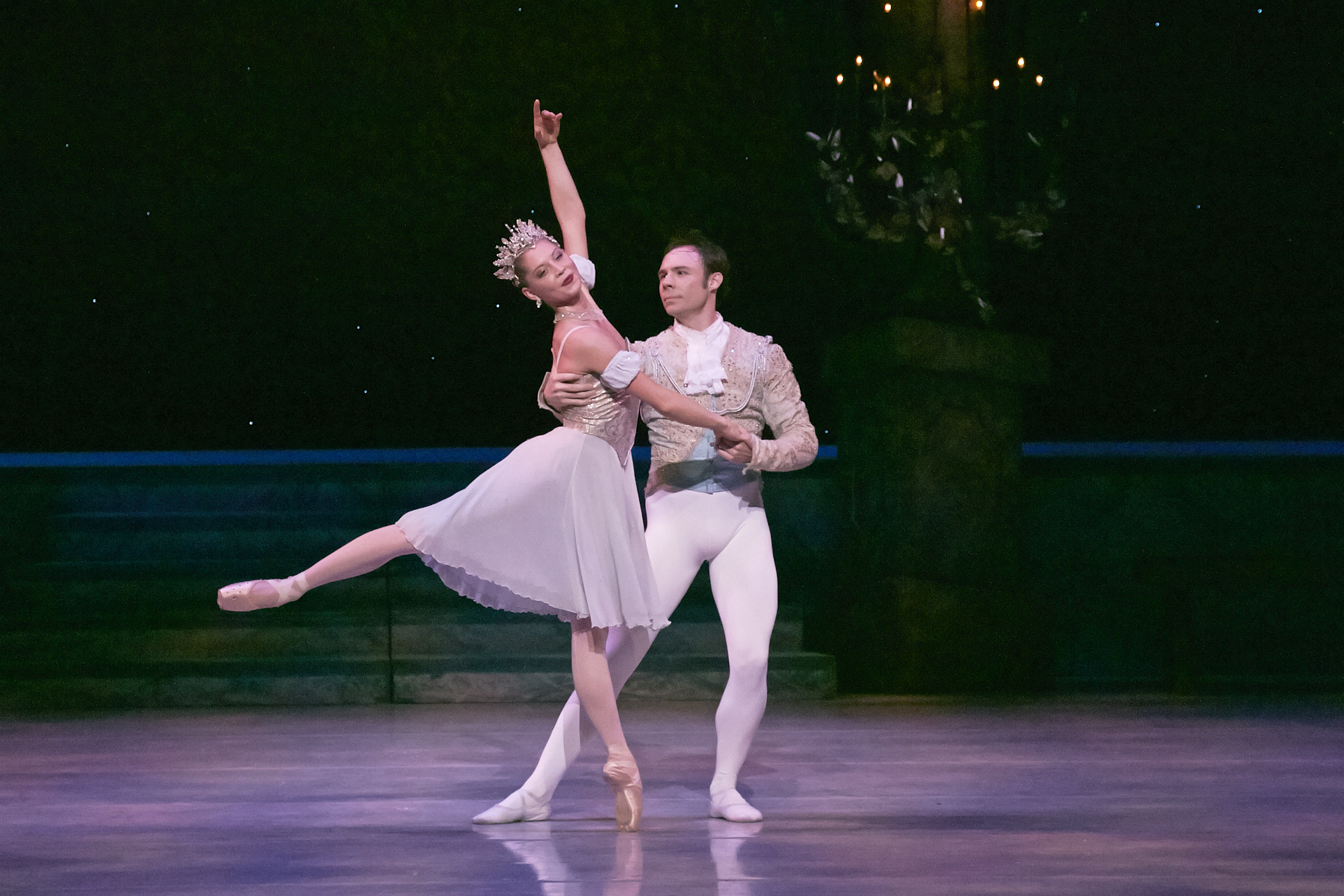
Scene from Cinderella, Pas de Deux

In ballet, there are no spoken words, so the dancer must use their movements and facial expressions to the communicate their feelings to the audience. Essentially, classical ballet is a form of mime.

Full-length narrative ballets form an important part of a ballet company's repertoire, often generating the highest ticket sales. Many newer narrative ballets are adapted from familiar stories or literature because they are recognizable to audiences.

== Notable narrative ballets ==
Narrative ballets are essential to a ballet company's repertoire, because they tend to generate the highest sales and bring families with children to see the ballet. People enjoy watching an art form where they are transformed into a different world. It's entertaining and exciting. Many newer narrative ballets are adapted from familiar stories or literature because they are recognizable to audiences. As mentioned above Swan Lake is one of the most famous examples of narrative ballet, other famous narrative ballets include: Giselle, The Nutcracker, Romeo and Juliet, and L'histoire de Manon. The story of Giselle is a romantic tale of innocent love and betrayal; of philandering Count Albrecht and a trusting peasant maid, Giselle. Although she has a weak heart, Giselle loves to dance. The Nutcracker is the story of how a young girl named Clara falls in love with a Nutcracker that magically comes to life and defeats an army of evil rats to save her life. Clara and the nutcracker then travel to the land of the sweets where Clara is introduced to the Sugar Plum Fairy and her Cavalier, and beautiful Arabian Princesses, Russian Cossacks, French ballet dancers and even exotic flowers, who all dance in her honor. The ballet Romeo and Juliet follows the same story as the famous Shakespearean play it is based on, the only difference between the two being the medium used is dance rather than acting. Lastly, the ballet L'histoire de Manon follows the love story of Manon and Grieux and their search for love and fortune.

== Other forms of ballet ==
While narrative ballet is easily the most well-known and appreciated form of ballet, there are many others that are important as well. There are considered to be four main styles of ballet: Classical, Neoclassical, Contemporary, and Romantic. Neoclassical ballet evolved from classical ballet, distinguishing itself for typically being abstract. The music of choice tends to be neoclassical as well, from musicians such as Roussel and Stravinsky. Contemporary ballet takes inspiration from classical ballet elements and adding modern techniques of jazz and other dance forms, and focuses more on athleticism and bigger and swifter tempos. Finally the last style of ballet is Romantic, which is very similar to Classical ballet in the fact that drama, emotion, and a strong storytelling are key components of the style. The main difference between the two styles lies within the costuming. The longer bell-shaped skirts of Romantic ballets are a far cry from the short, stiff, platter-style tutus worn in Classical pieces.

== Creating narrative ballets in the 21st century ==
Christopher Wheeldon, composer of The Winter's Tale, states that in today's age, "Design and the use of technology are important tools in storytelling... such as the well integrated use of projection in his ballet 'Alice' and 'Winter's tale'". While we love the classics such as Swan Lake, The Sleeping Beauty, and Cinderella, modern ballets should reflect the modern days changing technology. While classic ballets are interesting to the audience because of its unique plot and characters, it's a good idea to make minor tweak to the original work to hold the audiences' attention. This could mean adding a new character or making changes to a character's costume. However, any changes need to still reflect the original storyline. For example, costumes need to be appealing and reflect a character's personality. The lighting and staging needs to complement the storyline to keep it engaging.

== Notable narrative ballets ==
- Swan Lake
- Giselle
- The Nutcracker
- Romeo and Juliet
- L'histoire de Manon
- Cinderella
- Sleeping Beauty

== See also ==
- Ballet d'action
- Comic ballet
- List of ballets by title
- List of historical ballet characters
