= Claude Newman =

British ballet dancer

Claude Newman was a British ballet dancer with the Vic-Wells Ballet.

He had lead roles in Frederick Ashton's The Wise Virgins and Ninette de Valois' The Prospect Before Us.

By 1943, Newman was the company's ballet master.

In 1943, he danced The Lepidopterist in de Valois' Promenade.
