= Comic ballet =

Category of narrative ballet

Comic ballet is a subcategory of narrative ballet, and denotes a dramatic work of a light or comic nature. Catherine d'Medici enjoyed the Italian custom of staging entertainments where classical or allegorical legends were retold through music and dancing, and she introduced this custom to France. It was Catherine's court festival director, Baltazarini da Belgiojoso who staged and choreographed the 'Ballet Comique de la Reine'. This ballet was presented at the Petit Bourbon on 15 October 1581, and related the story of Circe.

Comic ballets include:

- Cinderella (Ashton)
- Coppélia
- Don Quixote
- La Fille Mal Gardée
- La fille mal gardée (Ashton)
- Frizak the Barber
- The Kermesse in Bruges
- The Lady and the Fool
- The Magic Flute
- The Parisian Market or Le Marché des Innocents
- Pineapple Poll
- Pirates of Penzance - The Ballet!
- Punch and the Judy
