= Annabelle Lopez Ochoa =

Belgian ballet dancer and choreographer (born 1973)

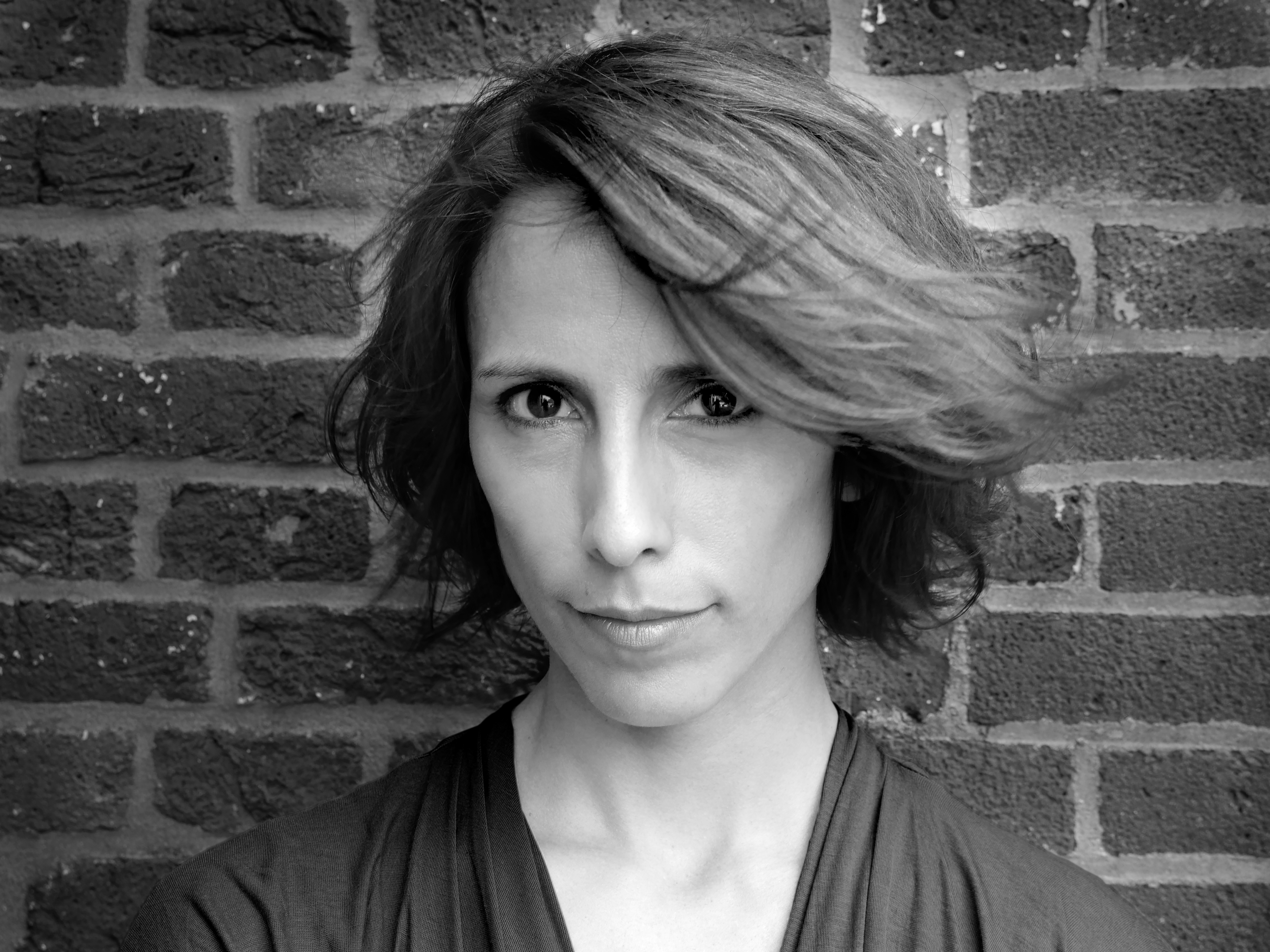
- Born: 30 April 1973 (age 53); Antwerp, Belgium
- Occupations: Dancer, choreographer

Annabelle Lopez Ochoa (born 30 April 1973) is a Belgian-Colombian international ballet dancer and choreographer based in Amsterdam, Netherlands.

== Dance background ==
Born in Antwerp to a Colombian father and a Belgian mother, Lopez Ochoa completed her dance training at the Koninklijke Balletschool Antwerpen, Belgium. She appeared with various German companies before eventually joining Djazzex, a contemporary dance company, in 1993. In 1997, she joined Scapino Ballet in Rotterdam, where she was a soloist for seven years.

== Choreographic style ==
Overall, Lopez Ochoa's work relates emotional experience through an abstract but intently connected style of choreography, which occasionally relies on virtuosic technique. Her movement is contemporary, however, she occasionally displays classical virtuosity, such as a soaring grand jeté. Because she uses the abstract form, her works do not have established plot lines or characters. She does, however, want the dancers to "tell a story" within the work. She achieves this by emphasizing the eyes, using them as a connecting point among the dancers on stage as well as with the audience. To organize her movement, she is interested in "constructed chaos", a carefully structured work that appears to lack structure. This method makes her creations insightfully detailed while remaining well organized. Lopez Ochoa enjoys working with a wide range of dancers, and also enjoys working with actors. She finds inspiration primarily from art and music, not from the dancers or from other choreographers.

== Before After ==
Lopez Ochoa's first critically acclaimed work in the United States is Before After in 2006, a seven-minute duet which "delineates the last moments of a relationship". The New York Times described the number as short and simple, but also "the most moving, the most mysterious, the most heartily cheered". Laura Bleiberg suggested that the piece was not unique in its themes or structure, and that "Ochoa added few insights". Before After is at this date on the repertoire of Dutch National Ballet, Finnish National Ballet, Gothenborg Ballet, Ballet Hispanico, Whim Whim, Ballet Nacional Dominicano, and Pacific Northwest Ballet.

== Awards ==
Lopez Ochoa won the International Choreographic Competition Hannover in 2001 with her work Clair/Obscur. She also won first prize at the Bornem International Choreographer's Competition in 2002 with Replay. In the fall of 2007, she participated in the New York Choreographic Institute, working for two weeks with the New York City Ballet. In January 2013, Lopez Ochoa was awarded the 'Best Classical Choreography' award by The Critics' Circle of the National Dance Awards UK for the production A Streetcar Named Desire, her first full-length ballet which she choreographed for the Scottish Ballet. In that same year the production received the South Bank Awards 2012 and was nominated for a Laurence Olivier Award. In January 2015, her work Sombrerisismo, created for Ballet Hispanico and one of the three commissions by the 2014 Fall for Dance Festival in New York City, is awarded with the Villanueva Critics' Award in Cuba.

== List of works ==
Lopez Ochoa has choreographed more than hundred works for 80 dance companies around the world such as: New York City Ballet, San Francisco Ballet, Atlanta Ballet, Royal New Zealand Ballet, Hong Kong Ballet, Scapino Ballet Rotterdam, Dutch National Ballet, Djazzex, The Royal Ballet of Flanders, Ballet du Grand Theatre du Genève, Ankara Modern Dance Theater, BalletX, Pennsylvania Ballet, Luna Negra Dance Theater, Istanbul Modern Dance Theater, BJM-Danse Montreal, Le Jeune Ballet du Québec, Gothenborg Ballet, Pennsylvania Ballet, Ballet National de Marseille, Ballet Hispanico, Jacoby & Pronk, Saarbrücken Ballett, Chemnitzer Ballett, Whim W'him, Incolballet, Pacific Northwest Ballet, Finnish National Ballet, Compañía Nacional de Danza, Scottish Ballet, Smuin Ballet, Ballet Austin, The Washington Ballet, Grand Rapids Ballet, Ballet Augsburg, Ballet Nacional Dominicano, Incolballet de Cali, Ballet Nacional de Cuba, Ballet Moscow, West Australian Ballet, Ballet Manila, Joffrey Ballet, Ballet Nacional de Chile, Ballet del Municipal de Santiago, and Danza Contemporanea de Cuba.

Lopez Ochoa has created a number of narrative ballets of which two are based on the life of Mexican painter Frida Kahlo, Broken Wings (2016) and Frida.

Other ballets based on existing material are Dangerous Liaisons (2016), and The Little Prince (2019). Her ballets based on the life of history-making women include Callas, La Divina (2023), Doña Perón (2022). Her ballet based on the life of Coco Chanel, Coco Chanel, the Life of a Fashion Icon, was commissioned by Hong Kong Ballet where it premiered in 2023, Atlanta Ballet where it was shown in February 2024, and Queensland Ballet which showed it in October that year.

In 2025 the choreographer became Artist in Residence engaged by the Theater Dortmund in Germany. Her brand new choreography Frida, plumbing the depths of the life of Frida Kahlo, premiere February 13, 2026, had very positive acclaim.

In 2025, Ochoa also worked with dance nonprofit vildwerk., which aims to increase environmental conservation awareness through dance, choreographing Symbiotic Twin at the organization's Dancing For Our Wonderful World program at New York Live Arts . Symbiotic Twin was performed by Benjamin Freemantle and Renan Cerdeiro.
