= Claire Calvert =

English ballet dancer

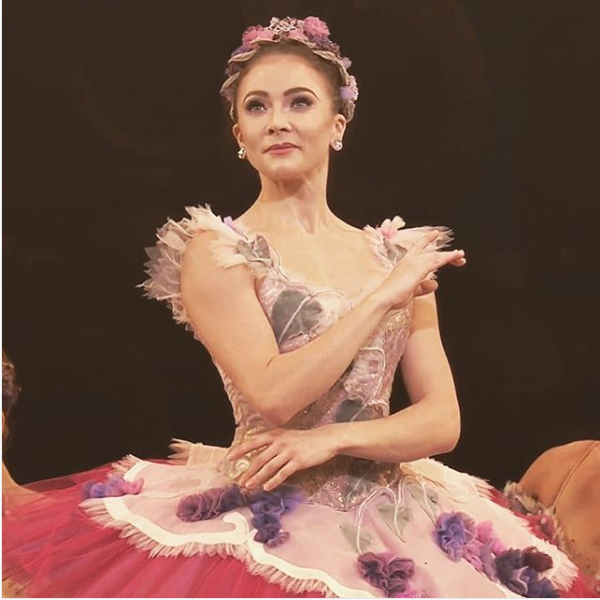
- Calvert as the Lilac Fairy in Sleeping Beauty (Royal Opera House, 2017)
- Born: 1988 (age 37–38); Bath, Somerset, England
- Occupation: Ballet dancer
- Spouse: Alexander Campbell (m. 2022)
- Children: 1
- Career
- Current group: The Royal Ballet

Claire Louise Calvert (born 1988) is an English ballet dancer and is a first soloist at the Royal Ballet.

== Early life and training ==
Calvert started ballet training at the age of three. She started attending The Royal Ballet School when she was 11, where she was coached by Darcey Bussell. She danced lead roles Raymonda Act III and Jabula on her graduation year. While she was a student, she danced roles such as a swan in Swan Lake, a nymph in The Sleeping Beauty and a snowflake in The Nutcracker at The Royal Ballet.

== Career ==
Calvert graduated into The Royal Ballet in 2007. In 2009, while she was still an Artist, she made her principal role debut, as The Lilac Fairy in The Sleeping Beauty. She was subsequently named First Artist in 2010, Soloist in 2012 and First Soloist in 2016. She has since other principal roles such as the Queen of Dryads and Mercedes in Don Quixote, Lescaut’s Mistress in Manon, Queen of the Willis in Giselle, Hermione in The Winter's Tale, Gypsy Girl in The Two Pigeons, Sugar Plum Fairy and Rose Fairy in The Nutcracker and Mitzi Caspar in Mayerling. She has created roles in works including Aeternum and Charlotte Edmonds’s dance film The Indifferent Beak (Deloitte Ignite 14).

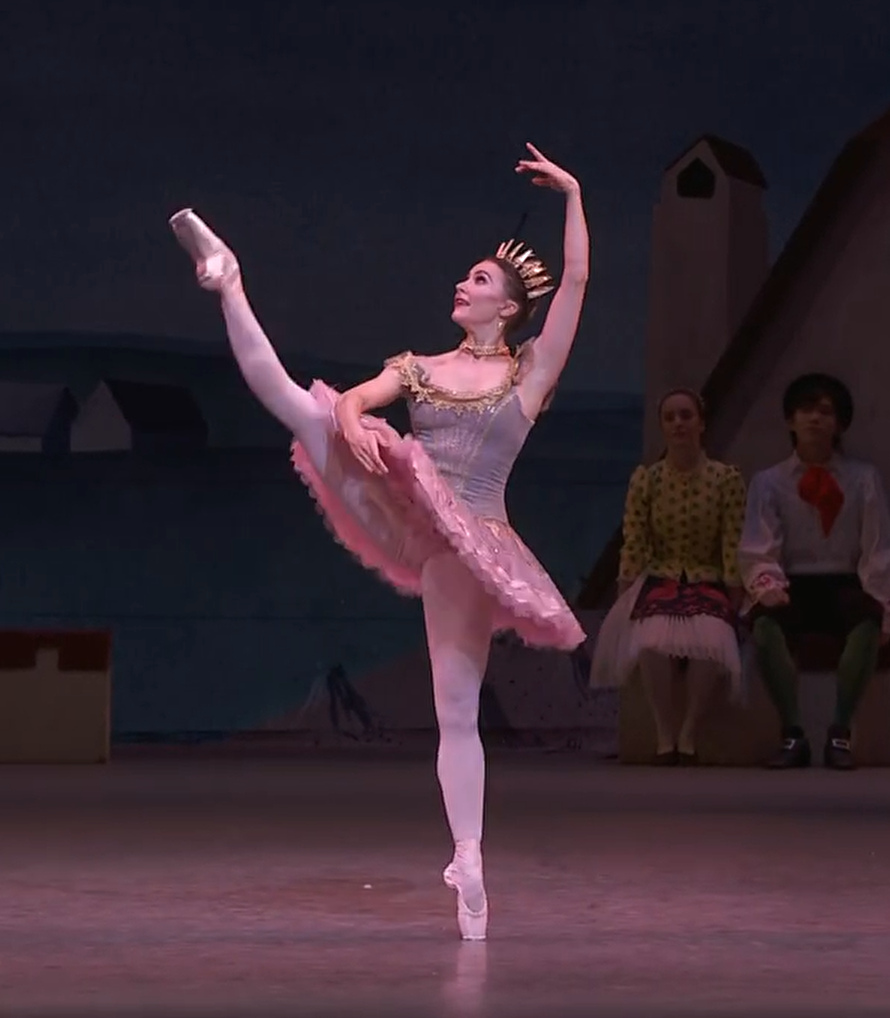
Claire Calvert in Coppèlia

== Personal life ==
In 2022, Calvert married Royal Ballet principal dancer Alexander Campbell. The couple has a daughter, born in 2023.

== Selected repertoire ==
- The Lilac Fairy in The Sleeping Beauty
- Hermione in The Winter’s Tale
- Sugar Plum Fairy and Rose Fairy in The Nutcracker
- Gamzatti in La Bayadère
- Mother/Queen of Hearts in Alice’s Adventures in Wonderland
- Odette/Odile in Swan Lake
- Olga in Winter Dreams
- Tsarevna in The Firebird
- Gypsy Girl in The Two Pigeons
- Hermia in The Dream
- Myrtha and Zulme Giselle
- Mitzi Caspar Mayerling
- Olga Anastasia
- Harlot Romeo and Juliet
- Winter Fairy in Cinderella
- Lescaut’s Mistress Manon
- Mercedes Don Quixote
- The third movement of Concerto
- Swan Lake
- Aeternum
- After the Rain
