= Mara Galeazzi =

Italian ballet dancer (born 1973)

- Born: 1973 (age 52–53); Brescia, Italy
- Occupation: Ballet dancer
- Years active: 1992-present
- Children: 1
- Dancing career
- Former groups: The Royal Ballet
- Dances: Ballet

Mara Galeazzi (born 1973) is an Italian ballet dancer actress and choreographer. She was a Principal Dancer of The Royal Ballet.

== Early life ==
Galeazzi was born in Brescia, Italy. At age 10, she started ballet training at La Scala Theatre Ballet School, where she graduated with full marks.

== Career ==
In 1992, at age 18, Galeazzi joined The Royal Ballet as an Artist. At the time, she didn't speak any English or know anyone in the company. The following year, while the company was on tour, she replaced an injured Gillian Revie as Mary Vetsera in Mayerling, with the approval of choreographer Kenneth MacMillan. She was promoted to First Artist in 1995, Soloist in 1998 and Principal in 2003. Her most notable roles in the company include Juliet in Romeo and Juliet, the title role in Anastasia, Tatiana in Onegin, the title role in The Firebird and the title role in Giselle. She has worked with choreographer such as Cathy Marston, Christopher Wheeldon, Wayne McGregor, Mats Ek, Jiri Kylian and William Forsythe, though she had never originated roles in MacMillan's works. Some of her performances were broadcast by the BBC.

On Galeazzi's performance in Onegin, The Guardian noted her dancing "truly register the churning of the lovers' guts and the scorched sensitivity of their nerve endings." The Guardian also noted Galeazzi's portrayal of Mary Vetsera in Mayerling "is a terrifying blend of the naive and depraved"

As a guest artist, she performed in Italy, Germany and Scotland, including her hometown, Brescia. She has danced with Irek Mukhamedov, Carlos Acosta, Tetsuya Kumakawa and Edward Watson'

In 2013, Galeazzi left the Royal Ballet in order to move to Oman to be with her husband, focus on new projects, teaching and charity work. She performed her final performance at the Royal Opera House on 13 June, dancing Mary Vetsera in Mayerling, with Edward Watson as her Rudolf. However, her final performance with the company is Manon in Monaco.

In 2014, Galeazzi returned to the Royal Ballet to dance the role of the mother in Ludovic Ondiviela's Cassandra at the Linbury Studio Theatre. Later, Galeazzi was asked by Wayne McGregor to cover for the leading role in Woolf Works, which was created on Alessandra Ferri. Though the work premiered in 2015, Galeazzi did not perform it until 2017. She also founded dance company M&T in Motion with Australian choreographer Tim Podesta. In 2016, she made her choreographic debut, which is a piece called Remembrance. In 2017/18, guested with Wayne McGregor company with +/-Humans and Three of Codes.

2018 Choreographed "Interruped cadences"

In 2020 started persuading acting.

2020 “Sola” choreography video and film by Maia Ianesi

“Dolce Melodia” choreography for the Kings International Ballet Academy

2021 performed " Aspettando (Waiting)" acting stage Italy

2023 "Her bi chance" by Alan Bennet acting performance London and choreographed "Toujours" Pas de deux performed in UK

Galeazzi has also been a founding advisory board member of vildwerk., a nonprofit organization inspiring conservation awareness through dance, since 2022. She performed a Joshua Beamish’s The Golden Turtle solo at the organization's inaugural event in 2023, and at the El Museo del Barrio, in 2024.

BOOK & PHOTOGRAPHY

2020 National Portrait Gallery images by Jason Ashwood

2021 “Shadow Aspect” Mara’s memoir by Jason Ashwood

== Selected repertoire ==
Galeazzi's repertoire with The Royal Ballet includes:

- Lise in La fille mal gardée
- The Thaïs pas de deux
- Voices of Spring
- Diana in Sylvia
- Fairy Autumn in Cinderella
- Moth in The Dream
- Rhapsody
- Scènes de Ballet
- Juliet in Romeo and Juliet
- Manon and Lescaut's mistress in Manon
- Mary Vetsera and Countess Marie Larisch in Mayerling
- The title role and Mathilde Kschessinska in Anastasia
- Winter Dreams’ Farewell pas de deux
- The Chosen one in Rite of the Spring
- The Second Movement of Concerto
- Principal White Girl in Song of the Earth
- The Woman in The Judas Tree
- Tatiana in Onegin
- Chroma
- Symphony in C
- Agon
- Calliope in Apollo
- "Emeralds" in Jewels
- Aurora in Coppélia
- The Dryad Queen in Don Quixote
- Carmen
- Le Spectre de la rose
- Woolf Works

=== Created roles ===
- Infra
- Mr Worldly Wise
- Souvenir
- Puirt-A-Beul
- Two Part Invention
- When We Stop Talking
- Cheating, Lying, Stealing
- Tidelines
- This House Will Burn
- La Grêle in Les Saisons
- On Public Display
- Eden
- The Mother in Cassandra

== Charity work ==
In 2005, Galeazzi organised a fundraising gala in Brescia for the research into childhood leukaemia. In 2007, she founded Dancing for the Children to help children with HIV in Africa. She had since organised other galas in Africa, London and Italy, for causes including Syrian refugees.

== Personal life ==
Galeazzi is married and has a daughter. Her husband is the Head of Operations of Royal Opera House Muscat. They live in Muscat, Oman and Italy.

== Honours ==
- Honorary member of Soroptimist International, 2005
- DANZA E DANZA (best female dance from Italy) 2006
- POSITANO AWARD 2008
- Order of Merit of the Italian Republic, 2009
- SHE MADE A DIFFERENT WOMEN OF THE YEAR 2017
- MERENZINO D'ORO LUCA MARENZIO GOLDEN PRIZE 2018
