= Wendy Ellis Somes =

British ballerina

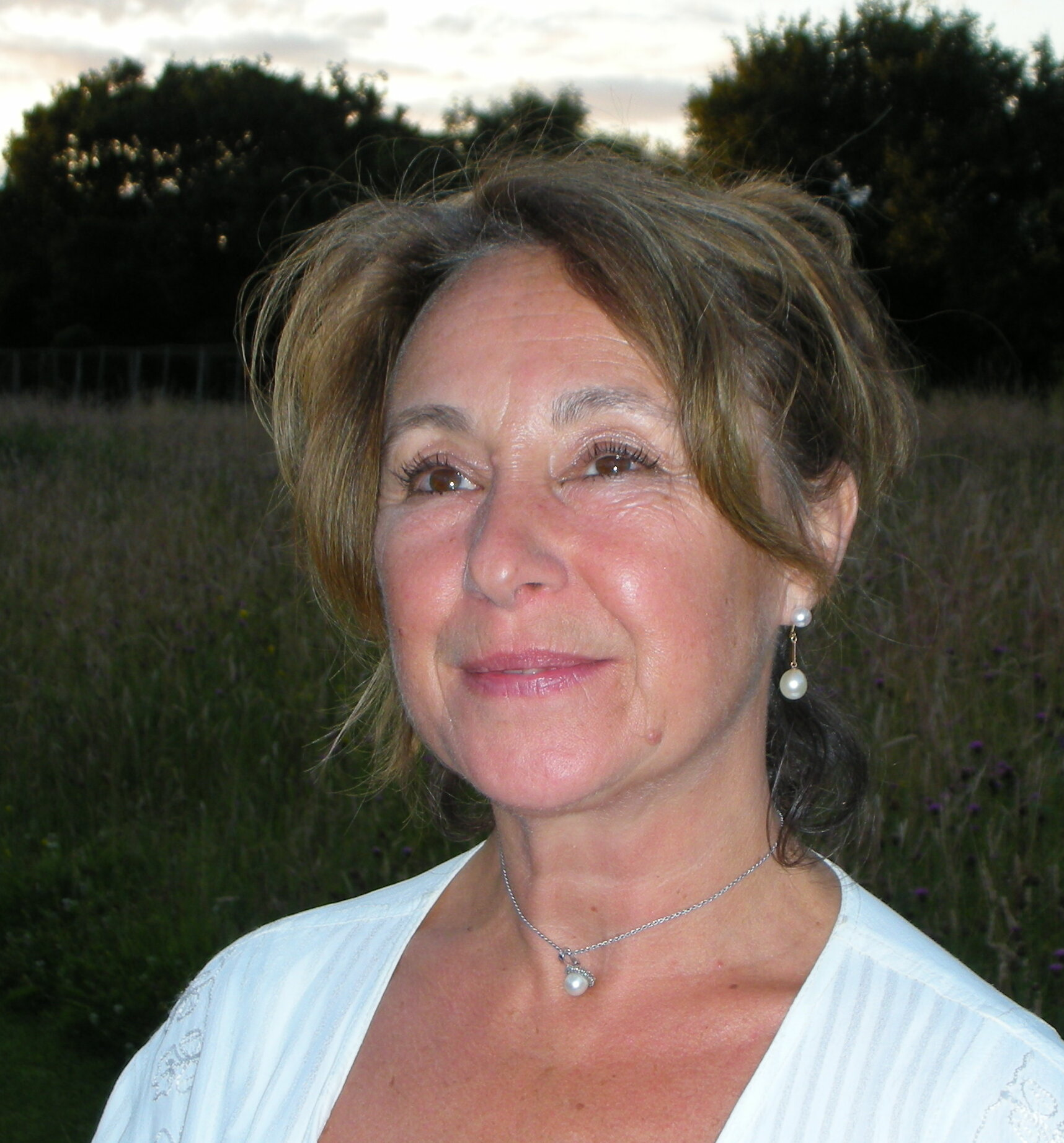
- Born: Wendy Rose Ellis; Blackburn, Lancashire, England
- Occupation: Ballerina
- Spouse: Michael Somes

Wendy Ellis Somes is a former principal ballerina with the Royal Ballet in London, and is now a worldwide producer of the Sir Frederick Ashton ballets Cinderella and Symphonic Variations.

== Early life ==
She was born Wendy Rose Ellis in Blackburn, and received her early training at the Carlotta School of Dance, later winning a British Ballet Organization scholarship. In 1963 she was selected to study at the Royal Ballet School, and moved to London with her parents to continue training. She started there in 1963 and joined the Royal Ballet in 1970.

== Career ==
=== Early career at the Royal Ballet ===
Initially part of the corps de ballet, Ellis quickly progressed to solo roles such as Princess Florine in Sleeping Beauty, the Young Girl in Ashton's The Two Pigeons, and Lise in another Ashton ballet, La fille mal gardée. It was during this time that she met her future husband Michael Somes.

=== Later career at the Royal Ballet ===
Ellis later danced in many Royal Ballet productions, with notable main/leading parts in ballets by Ashton (Cinderella, La fille mal gardée, Symphonic Variations, The Dream, Enigma Variations, A Month in the Country, Jazz Calendar, Les Patineurs, A Wedding Bouquet, Façade), alongside roles in his Les Rendezvous, Scènes de ballet, Birthday Offering, La Valse, and Monotones I). She danced main roles in the ballets of Sir Kenneth MacMillan (Romeo and Juliet, Mayerling, Gloria), with the role of Princess Stephanie in Mayerling, and her role in Gloria, created for her by MacMillan. Among the other MacMillan works, she performed in The Rite of Spring, The Invitation, Song of the Earth, Elite Syncopations and My Brother, My Sisters. She also danced in works by George Balanchine, Bronislava Nijinska, Hans van Manen, Jerome Robbins and John Neumeier, and in the classics, including the main role of Aurora in Sleeping Beauty. She retired from dancing in 1990.

=== Ballet producer ===
After retiring, Ellis began to work more closely with Somes on ballet production. Somes and Ashton had been friends and collaborators since before World War II in 1939, and Somes had staged many of Ashton's ballets at the Royal Ballet and elsewhere after his retirement from classical dancing in 1961 (he continued in character roles for a number of years afterwards). Ashton bequeathed his Cinderella and Symphonic Variations to Somes on his death in 1988. Ellis and Somes together produced Cinderella with the Royal Swedish Ballet in Stockholm, and Symphonic Variations with Dutch National Ballet in Amsterdam, followed by American Ballet Theatre in New York. Somes then willed his Ashton ballets to Ellis, and they passed to her on his death in 1994.

Ellis subsequently produced Ashton's Cinderella with the National Ballet of Japan at the New National Theatre in Tokyo, the Royal Ballet itself (creating a new production with designers Toer van Schayk and Christine Haworth in 2003, and a further new production collaboration in 2023 with sets by Tom Pye and costumes by Alexandra Byrne ), the Joffrey Ballet in Chicago and Los Angeles , the Polish National Ballet in Warsaw, Ballet West in Salt Lake City, Boston Ballet in Boston and American Ballet Theatre in New York. She produced Symphonic Variations again with the Dutch National Ballet after the passing of Somes, followed by the National Ballet of Canada in Toronto, the Royal Ballet , the San Francisco Ballet in San Francisco, the Birmingham Royal Ballet at Sadler's Wells Theatre in London, Sarasota Ballet in Sarasota, Florida, Australian Ballet in Sydney, Australia, Ballett am Rhein in Düsseldorf, Germany and the Washington Ballet in Washington, D.C.

== Media ==
Ellis was part of the 1978 The South Bank Show television documentary about Mayerling.

At the invitation of Margot Fonteyn, Ellis featured in the 1979 BBC Television series The Magic of Dance.
