= Neoclassical ballet =

20th-century ballet style

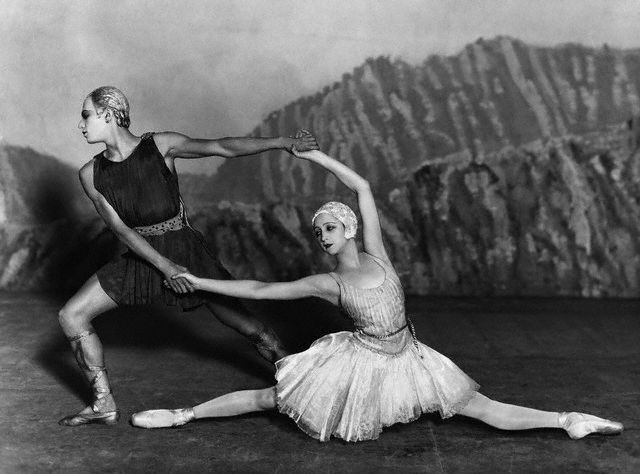
Alexandra Danilova and Serge Lifar, Apollon Musagète, 1928

Neoclassical ballet is the style of 20th-century classical ballet exemplified by the works of George Balanchine. The term "neoclassical ballet" appears in the 1920s with Sergei Diaghilev's Ballets Russes, in response to the excesses of romanticism and post-romantic modernism. It draws on the advanced technique of 19th-century Russian Imperial dance, but strips it of its detailed narrative and heavy theatrical setting while retaining many key techniques, such as pointe technique.

== History and development ==
Neoclassical ballet is a genre of dance that emerged in the 1920s and evolved throughout the 20th century. Artists of many disciplines in the early 1900s began to rebel against the overly dramatized style of the Romantic Period. As a result, art returned to a more simplistic style reminiscent of the Classical Period, except bolder, more assertive and free of distractions. This artistic trend came to be known as Neoclassicism. The ballet choreographer who most exemplified this new, clean aesthetic, was George Balanchine. As a child, the importance of classicism was imprinted on him when he was a student at the famed Imperial Ballet School, which was (and remains) steadfast in its firm commitment to classical ballet technique. Upon his graduation, Balanchine earned the privilege of choreographing for the Ballets Russes, where he had the opportunity to collaborate with Picasso, Matisse, Chanel, Debussy, Stravinsky and Prokofiev, who were all at the forefront of Neoclassicism. Rather than turning away from his classical training, Balanchine built upon the traditional ballet vocabulary. He extended traditional ballet positions, played with speed and freedom of movement, and incorporated new positions not traditionally seen in ballet. Balanchine's first foray into the neoclassical style was Apollon Musegete, choreographed in 1928 for the Ballets Russes, and set to a score by Stravinsky. Unlike many of his later neoclassical works, this ballet tells a story, which indicates that Balanchine had not yet completely broken free from the Romantic tradition. Moreover, when this ballet first premiered it featured large sets, costumes and props. However, Balanchine continually revised it as his neoclassical style evolved. For example, later versions of the ballet utilized white practice leotards and minimal sets and lights. Balanchine even renamed the ballet simply Apollo. The transformation of Apollo exemplifies Balanchine’s transformation as a choreographer. As Balanchine’s neoclassical style matured, he produced more plotless, musically driven ballets. Large sets and traditional tutus gave way to clean stages and plain leotards. This simplified external style allowed for the dancers’ movement to become the main artistic medium, which is the hallmark of neoclassical ballet.

Balanchine found a home for his neoclassical style in the United States, when Lincoln Kirstein brought him to New York in 1933 to start a ballet company. He famously decided to start a school, where he could train dancers in the style he wanted, and so the School of American Ballet was founded in 1934. Many of his most famous neoclassical ballets were choreographed in the United States, on both his school eventually his own company, the New York City Ballet, which he founded in 1948 and still exists today. Well-known neoclassical ballets like Concerto Barocco, (1941), Four Temperaments, (1946), Agon, (1957), and Episodes, (1959) were all choreographed in New York.

== Significant choreographers and works ==
Although much of Balanchine's work epitomized the genre, some choreographers like the British Frederick Ashton and Kenneth MacMillan were also great neoclassical choreographers.

- George Balanchine
  - Apollo (1928)
  - The Prodigal Son (1929)
  - Serenade (1934)
  - Concerto Barocco (1941)
  - Symphony in C (1947)
  - Agon (1957)
  - Jewels (1967)
- Serge Lifar
  - Les Créatures de Prométhée (1929)
  - Le Spectre de la rose (personal version) (1931)
  - L'Après-midi d'un faune (personal version) (1935)
  - Icare (1935)
  - Istar (1941)
  - Suite en Blanc (1943)
- Frederick Ashton
  - Symphonic Variations (1946)
  - Cinderella (1948)
  - Sylvia (1952)
  - Romeo and Juliet (1956)
  - Ondine (1958)
  - La Fille Mal Gardee (1960)
  - The Dream (1964)
- Roland Petit
  - Le jeune homme et la mort (1946)
  - Carmen (1949)
  - Notre-Dame de Paris (1965)
  - Proust, ou Les intermittences du coeur (1974)
  - Clavigo (1999)
- Kenneth MacMillan
  - Romeo and Juliet (1965)
  - Anastasia (1967)
  - L'histoire de Manon (1974)
- Jerome Robbins
  - Dances at a Gathering (1969)
- John Cranko
  - Onegin (1965)
  - The Taming of the Shrew (1969)
