= Georgina Parkinson =

English ballet dancer and ballet mistress

- Born: 20 August 1938; Brighton, England
- Died: 18 December 2009 (aged 71); Manhattan, New York City, U.S.
- Education: Sadler's Wells Ballet School
- Occupations: ballet dancer; ballet mistress
- Organizations: The Royal Ballet; American Ballet Theatre
- Spouse: Roy Round
- Children: 1

Georgina Parkinson (20 August 1938 – 18 December 2009) was an English ballet dancer and ballet mistress. She joined The Royal Ballet in 1957 and was promoted to principal dancer in 1962. Best known for dancing 20th-century works, she was a frequent collaborator of choreographer Kenneth MacMillan, and had also created roles for Frederick Ashton. In 1978, she accepted the invitation to become a ballet mistress at the American Ballet Theatre for a year, before assuming the position permanently in 1980. She also performed character roles with the American Ballet Theatre.

== Early life ==
Parkinson was born on 20 August 1938 in Brighton, England. She went to a convent school in Rottingdean, where she took weekly ballet classes. The nuns at the school noticed the shape of her feet and encouraged her parents to send her to pursue ballet training outside of the school. She trained with a local teacher before entering the Sadler's Wells Ballet School (now The Royal Ballet School) on scholarship, after an audition with Ninette de Valois, the founder of The Royal Ballet. At her graduation performance, she danced the role of Odette in Swan Lake.

== Career ==
=== 1957–1978: Royal Ballet ===
Parkinson joined The Royal Ballet in 1957, at age 19. When she joined the company, it was run by Frederick Ashton. In 1962, Ashton promoted her to principal dancer. The same year, she made a guest appearance with the Stuttgart Ballet to dance Cranko's version of Daphnis and Chloé as Chloé, partnering with Erik Bruhn. She created roles in some of Kenneth MacMillan's earlier works, including Symphony (1963) and as Rosaline in Romeo and Juliet (1965), in which she later danced the title role. In 1964, Ashton introduced Parkinson to Bronislava Nijinska, when the company acquired Nijinska's Les Biches. Nijinska chose Parkinson to dance the lead role of La Garconne, and the two spent weeks working rehearsing. In 1966, she worked with Nijinska again, this time for a revival of Les Noces. The same year, she created a role in Ashton's Monotones I.

In 1967, Parkinson was requested by MacMillan, who had become a close friend, to withdraw from the Royal Ballet's Canadian tour to take over as the lead in his new work Anastasia with the Berlin Opera Ballet, the company he was directing, as Lynn Seymour was injured. She learned the part within two and a half weeks in an apartment. Ultimately, Seymour decided to perform despite MacMillan's anger and Parkinson had to mediate between them. Instead of Anastasia, Parkinson danced Solitaire on the same program. The next year, she originated a role in Ashton's Enigma Variations, as Edward Elgar's friend Winifred Norbury. In 1969, when the Royal Swedish Ballet debut MacMillan's Romeo and Juliet, MacMillan cast her as Juliet on opening night. After MacMillan's term in Berlin ended, he returned to London and created a few more dramatic roles on her, including the Tsarina in the three-act version of Anastasia (1971) and the gaoler's mistress in Manon (1974).

Parkinson had also danced in the Royal Ballet premieres of Balanchine's Apollo, and as the episode from the past in Tudor's Jardin aux lilas. Other ballets she had performed include MacMillan's Song of the Earth, as the wife in The Invitation, Ashton's Birthday Offering, Cinderella, as Lykanion in Daphnis and Chloé, as Friday entry in Jazz Calendar, Symphonic Variations, Scènes de Ballet, as the Gypsy Girl in The Two Pigeons, Howard's La Belle Dame sans Merci, as the Aristocrat in Massine's Mam'zelle Angot, Robbins' The Concert. Despite being known for performing 20th-century works, she had also danced classical ballets such as Odette-Odile in Swan Lake, the title role in Raymonda, solos in La Bayadère, Myrtha in Giselle and Les Sylphides.

Parkinson was asked to teach MacMillan's Romeo and Juliet to Mikhail Baryshnikov and Leslie Browne, for Herbert Ross' 1977 film The Turning Point. In 1978, she created her last role for MacMillan, as Empress Elisabeth of Austria in Mayerling.

=== 1978–2009: American Ballet Theatre ===
In 1978, Nora Kaye, a former ballet dancer and Herbert Ross' wife, invited Parkinson to teach classes at the American Ballet Theatre. She returned to London in 1979 to stay with her family, before moving to New York in 1980 to assume the position permanently. She primarily worked with principal dancers and soloists. Julie Kent, a principal dancer at American Ballet Theatre, said she "learned everything from" Parkinson.

At the American Ballet Theatre, she had also performed character roles, including the Queen in The Sleeping Beauty, Madam Larina in Cranko's Onegin, and the Stepmother de Mille's Fall River Legend. She also created the role of Mrs. Harriman in Tharp's Everlast and the soldier's mother in Ratmansky's On the Dnieper.

In 2009, due to financial hardship, she was let go by the company. Prior to her death, she coached actresses Natalie Portman and Mila Kunis for the film Black Swan.

== Personal life and death ==
Parkinson was married to photographer Roy Round. Their son, Tobias, is married to Leanne Benjamin, a former Royal Ballet principal dancer.

In 2009, Parkinson was diagnosed with cancer. On 18 December the same year, she died from the disease in Manhattan. She was 71.
