= Anthony Dowell =

British ballet dancer

Sir Anthony James Dowell CBE (born 16 February 1943) is a retired British ballet dancer and a former artistic director of the Royal Ballet. He is widely recognized as one of the great danseurs nobles of the twentieth century.

== Early life and training ==
Born in London, Dowell began his dance training there in 1948, at the age of five. His first ballet teacher was June Hampshire, who nurtured her young pupil and instilled in him the discipline necessary for serious students of ballet. When he was ten years old, he enrolled in the Sadler's Wells Ballet School, then located in Barons Court, and embarked on a course of training for young people interested in pursuing a career in dance.

In 1955, the school moved to White Lodge, Richmond Park, and became residential, combining general education and vocational ballet training. In 1956, when a royal charter was granted to the Sadler's Wells Ballet, the school was renamed the Royal Ballet School. Dowell continued his training there, moving to the Barons Court studios for the final three years of his course of study. Upon his graduation in 1960, he was immediately taken into the Covent Garden Opera Ballet. After a year dancing with this company, he was invited to join The Royal Ballet.

== Performing career ==
Among the first to recognize Dowell's potential was the Danish dancer Erik Bruhn. As guest choreographer with the Royal Ballet, he gave Dowell a sparkling solo variation in his 1962 staging of the famous pas de six from August Bournonville's Napoli. Thereafter, Dowell's talent and extraordinary abilities could not be ignored. In 1964, Frederick Ashton, chief choreographer of the company, chose him to create the role of Oberon in The Dream, a balletic retelling of Shakespeare's A Midsummer Night's Dream. With his quicksilver technique and impeccable line, Dowell made the role his own and established himself in the top tier of the company's male dancers. Dancing to Mendelssohn's melodic "Nocturne" with Antoinette Sibley as Titania, he took the first steps in forming what became a lasting and legendary partnership, as their slender, blond looks and classical purity found a startling echo in each other. In 1965, Dowell was cast in Ashton's elegant and serene Monotones and then as the boisterous Benvolio in Kenneth MacMillan's historic production of Romeo and Juliet.

When Dowell was promoted to principal dancer in 1966, he was already the embodiment of the English classical style: cool, lyrical, aristocratic, and restrained. If the role of Oberon had drawn out a quality of magical glamour from him, the experience of working with Antony Tudor in 1967 on the leading role of Shadowplay considerably deepened his dramatic expression. He subsequently created dramatic roles in the ballets of Ashton, MacMillan, and others. Among the most important were Troyte in Ashton's Enigma Variations (1968), Des Grieux in MacMillan's Manon (1974), and Beliaev in Ashton's A Month in the Country (1976). In the classical repertory, he appeared in princely roles in Giselle, Swan Lake, The Sleeping Beauty, and The Nutcracker. He undertook more lighthearted roles in La fille mal gardée, Card Game, and Varii Capricci, with which, in 1983, Ashton celebrated his continued partnership with Sibley. He was also praised for the passion and musicality he brought to leading roles in Ashton's Cinderella, Daphnis and Chloe, and Symphonic Variations, in MacMillan's Song of the Earth and Romeo and Juliet, in Jerome Robbins's Dances at a Gathering and In the Night, and in George Balanchine's Agon.

In the early 1970s, Dowell began to explore activities away from the ballet stage. Trying his hand at costume design, he created stage wear for himself and Sibley in Ashton's Meditation from Thaïs and for dancers in MacMillan's Pavane, in Balanchine's Tchaikovsky Pas de Deux and Symphony in C, and in Robbins's In the Night. He also began to look for opportunities beyond Covent Garden. Between 1978 and 1980, he took leave of absence from the Royal Ballet to dance as guest artist with American Ballet Theatre in New York. There he added Solor in La Bayadère and Basilio in Don Quixote to his roster of leading roles. Along with experiencing the challenges of a new repertory, he partnered such bright stars as Natalia Makarova in Swan Lake and Gelsey Kirkland in Romeo and Juliet. After his official retirement from the Royal Ballet in 1984, he continued to make occasional dance appearances well into his fifties, creating roles in MacMillan's Winter Dreams in 1991 and in Peter Wright's production of The Nutcracker in 1999.

== Roles created ==
Among the many roles created by Dowell in his long career are the following.

- 1964. The Dream, choreography by Frederick Ashton, music by Felix Mendelssohn, arranged by John Lanchbery. Role: Oberon, with Antoinette Sibley as Titania.
- 1965. Monotones (later known as Monotones II), choreography by Frederick Ashton, music by Erik Satie, orchestrated by Claude Debussy and Roland-Manuel. Role: a pas de trois with Vyvyan Lorrayne and Robert Mead.
- 1965. Romeo and Juliet, choreography by Kenneth MacMillan, music by Sergei Prokofiev. Role: Benvolio.
- 1967. Shadowplay, choreography by Antony Tudor, music by Charles Koechlin. Role: The Boy with Matted Hair.
- 1968. Jazz Calendar, choreography by Frederick Ashton, music by Richard Rodney Bennett. Role: Tuesday, a pas de trois with Merle Park and Robert Mead.
- 1968. Enigma Variations (My Friends Pictured Within), choreography by Frederick Ashton, music by Edward Elgar. Role: Arthur Troyte Griffith (Troyte), Malvern architect and close friend.
- 1971. Anastasia (three-act version), choreography by Kenneth MacMillan, music by Pyotr Ilyich Tchaikovsky and Bohuslav Martinů, with electronic music by Fritz Winckel and Rũdiger Rûfer. Role: a pas de deux with Antoinette Sibley as ballerina Matilde Kchessinska.
- 1972. Meditation from Thaïs, choreography by Frederick Ashton, music by Jules Massenet. Role: a pas de deux with Antoinette Sibley.
- 1972. Triad, choreography by Kenneth MacMillan, music by Sergei Prokofiev. Role: Elder Brother, with Wayne Eagling as the Younger Brother and Antoinette Sibley as their love interest.
- 1974. Manon, choreography by Kenneth MacMillan, music by Jules Massenet, arranged by Leighton Lucas with Hilda Graunt. Role: Des Grieux, a student, with Antoinette Sibley as Manon.
- 1975. Four Schumann Pieces, choreography by Hans van Manen, music by Robert Schumann. Role: principal dancer.
- 1975. The Four Seasons, choreography by Kenneth MacMillan, music by Giuseppe Verdi. Role: Autumn.
- 1976. A Month in the Country, choreography by Frederick Ashton, music by Frédéric Chopin, arranged by John Lanchbery. Role: Beliaev, Kolias' tutor, with Lynn Seymour as Natalia Petrovna.
- 1980. Soupirs, choreography by Frederick Ashton, music by Edward Elgar. Role: a pas de deux with Antoinette Sibley.
- 1980. La Bayadère, choreography by Natalia Makarova after Marius Petipa, music by Ludwig Minkus. Role: Solor.
- 1982. The Tempest, choreography by Rudolf Nureyev, music by Pyotr Ilyich Tchaikovsky, arranged by John Lanchbery. Role: Prospero.
- 1982. Le Chant du Rossignol, choreography by Frederick Ashton, music by Igor Stravinsky. Role: The Fisherman, with Natalia Makarova as the Nightingale.
- 1983. Varii Capricci, choreography by Frederick Ashton, music by William Walton. Role: Lo Straniero, a gigolo, with Antoinette Sibley as his client.
- 1989. The Prince of the Pagodas, choreography by Kenneth MacMillan, music by Benjamin Britten. Role: The Emperor.
- 1991. Winter Dreams, choreography by Kenneth MacMillan, music by Pyotr Ilyich Tchaikovsky, arranged by Philip Gammon, traditional Russian music arranged for guitar ensemble by Thomas Hartman. Role: Kulygin, the betrayed husband, with Darcey Bussell as Masha.
- 1994. The Rime of the Ancient Mariner, a BBC Television production for Dance for the Camera, choreography by Will Tuckett. Role: The Mariner.
- 1999. The Nutcracker, produced by Peter Wright, music by Pyotr Ilyich Tchaikovsky. Role: Herr Drosselmeyer.

== Videography ==
The dancing of Anthony Dowell can be viewed on a number of commercially available DVDs, listed below. Those issued under the Kultur label were produced by BBC Television in association with NVC Arts, Warner Music Division.

- 1969. Cinderella, choreography by Frederick Ashton. The Royal Ballet, with Antoinette Sibley as Cinderella, Dowell as the Prince, and Ashton and Robert Helpmann as the Ugly Sisters. Kultur DVD, D0093, released 1976.
- 1977, Valentino. A film written and directed by Ken Russell, with Rudolf Nureyev as Valentino, Leslie Caron as Alla Nazimova and Dowell as Vaslav Nijinsky. United Artists, Chartoff-Winkler Productions.
- 1980. Swan Lake, original choreography by Marius Petipa and Lev Ivanov, additional choreography by Frederick Ashton and Rudolf Nureyev. The Royal Ballet, with Natalia Makarova as Odette/Odile and Dowell as Prince Siegfried. Kultur DVD, D1408, released 2003.
- 1982. Manon, choreography by Kenneth MacMillan. The Royal Ballet, with Jennifer Penney as Manon, Dowell as the Chevalier des Grieux, and David Wall as Lescaut, her cousin. Kultur DVD, D2096, released 1982.
- 1985. The Nutcracker, produced by Peter Wright. The Royal Ballet, with Lesley Collier as the Sugar Plum Fairy and Dowell as her prince. Kultur DVD.
- 1974–1985. Great Pas de Deux, a collection. Anthony Dowell appears in three selections: (1) the grand pas de deux (act 2) from Peter Wright's staging of The Nutcracker, with Lesley Collier; (2) the bedroom pas de deux (act 1, scene 2) from Kenneth MacMillan's Manon, with Jennifer Penney; and (3) the final pas de deux from Frederick Ashton's A Month in the Country, with Natalia Makarova. Kultur DVD, D2022, released 1997.
- 1990. The Prince of the Pagodas, choreography by Kenneth MacMillan. The Royal Ballet, with Darcey Bussell as Princess Rose, Jonathan Cope as the Prince, and Dowell as the Emperor. Kultur DVD.
- 1991. Winter Dreams, choreography by Kenneth MacMillan. The Royal Ballet, with Darcey Bussell as Masha, Dowell as Kulygin, her husband and Viviana Durante as Irina. Kultur DVD.
- 1994. The Sleeping Beauty, original choreography by Marius Petipa, additional choreography by Frederick Ashton, Kenneth MacMillan, and Feodor Lopukov. The Royal Ballet, with Viviana Durante as Aurora, Zoltán Solymosi as Prince Désiré, Benazir Hussein as the Lilac Fairy, and Dowell as Carabosse. Opus Arte DVD.
- 1999. The Nutcracker, produced by Peter Wright. The Royal Ballet, with Alina Cojocaru as Clara, Ivan Putrov as The Nutcracker/Hans-Peter, and Dowell as Drosselmeyer. Opus Arte DVD.

== Administrative career ==
In 1984, Dowell was appointed assistant to Norman Morrice, director of the Royal Ballet. A year later he was made associate director, and in 1986 he was promoted to the post of artistic director of the company. During his tenure, he succeeded in checking declining technical standards among the soloists and the corps de ballet, and he encouraged and nurtured many world-class talents, among them Darcey Bussell, Jonathan Cope, Sylvie Guillem, and Carlos Acosta. In 1987, his new production of Swan Lake drew sharp criticism from the press and audiences alike. A number of traditional dance passages, created by Marius Petipa and Lev Ivanov for their 1885 revival were cut, much to the displeasure of balletomanes. Additional choreography by Frederick Ashton and Rudolf Nureyev added a certain interest to the development of the story but could not make up for omissions of well-loved dances. Further, radical changes in sets and costume, designed by Yolanda Sonnabend, evoked muttering among viewers. Costumes for acts 1 and 3, set in the opulence of Romanov Russia in the 1890s, were "festooned with ribbons and golden squiggles" while those for acts 2 and 4 dressed the swans in "champagne ball-gowns rather than pristine white feathers". Thus, the mysterious beauty of the lake of the swans was lost. Despite these disagreeable features, the production remained in the Royal Ballet repertory for almost three decades.

The following season, in 1988, Dowell persuaded Ashton to allow Ondine to be revived after an absence from the repertory of more than twenty years. Maria Almeida was cast as Ondine, the role created in 1958 by Margot Fonteyn, and Dowell shared the stage with her as Palemon, the role originated by Michael Somes. Dowell's next major production of a classic ballet was The Sleeping Beauty, in 1994. Conceived, directed, and produced by him, it starred Viviana Durante as the Princess Aurora and featured Dowell himself in a glittering embodiment of evil as the wicked fairy Carabosse. The production was not popular with audiences and was considered a failure, largely owing to the irrational and unattractive designs by Maria Björnson. The negative reviews of his Swan Lake and The Sleeping Beauty did not, however, seriously affect Dowell's reputation, as he was held in high regard by all who worked with him. In 2001, a gala performance marking his farewell to the Royal Opera House ushered him into retirement in a volley of flowers and nostalgic acclaim. At age fifty-eight, he had served fifteen years as director of the Royal Ballet, and British theatregoers paid him well-deserved homage for what he had accomplished in that post as well as for his stage career as one of the most admired and beloved dancers in the company's history.

== Later life ==
After stepping down as artistic director of the company, Dowell staged productions of several works in his repertory, notably The Dream, which he mounted for American Ballet Theatre, Ballet West, the Joffrey Ballet, the Tokyo Ballet, and the Dutch National Ballet. He also appeared as the narrator of Igor Stravinsky's opera-oratorio Oedipus rex at the Metropolitan Opera House in New York and for the Joffrey and Royal Ballet productions of Ashton's A Wedding Bouquet, speaking the verses of Gertrude Stein. He remains active as a guest coach with the Royal Ballet, as a governor of the Royal Ballet School, and as a member of the Royal Academy of Dance and the Imperial Society of Teachers of Dancing.

== Honours and awards ==
In 1972, Dowell was presented with the annual Dance Magazine Award for the man whose contributions had made a lasting impact on the dance world. In 1973, in recognition of his services to ballet in the United Kingdom, he was named a Commander of the Most Excellent Order of the British Empire (CBE) in the Queen's Birthday Honours List. He was then the youngest dancer ever to be so honored. In 1995, he was the recipient of the Queen Elizabeth II Coronation Award for 1994, the highest honour bestowed by the Royal Academy of Dance, and, capping a lifetime of accolades, he was created a Knight Bachelor, again being named on the Queen's Birthday Honours List of 1995. Upon being knighted by the queen in a ceremony at Buckingham Palace, he was entitled to being addressed as Sir Anthony. In 2002, he was the recipient of the De Valois Award for Outstanding Achievement in Dance, given by the British Critics' Circle at a celebration of the national dance awards for the previous year.

== Personal life ==
Dowell has always been circumspect about his sexuality, but it is common knowledge that, soon after graduating from the Royal Ballet School in 1960, he began a romantic relationship with Derek Rencher (1932–2014), a handsome Royal Ballet dancer nine years his senior. They often shared the Covent Garden stage, as Rencher was a powerful and popular character dancer and actor. Some time after that affair ended, Dowell met Jay Jolley, a young American who had starred in London Festival Ballet. Dowell and Jolley formed a relationship, after which Jolley was invited to join The Royal Ballet as a principal dancer. The relationship has remained solid and steady to the present day. Jolley now serves as assistant director of the Royal Ballet School.

When Frederick Ashton died in 1988, he left "all royalties and profits from my copyrights" to a small group of friends. Those from The Dream and A Month in the Country were bequeathed to Anthony Dowell.
