= Laura Morera =

Spanish ballet dancer

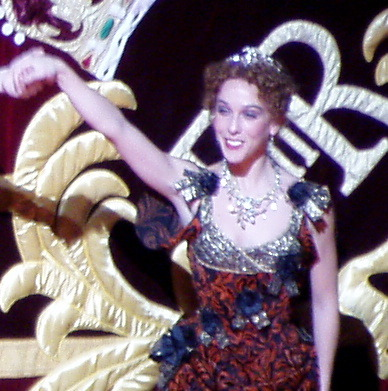
- Morera at the curtain call of MacMillan's Mayerling
- Education: Royal Ballet School
- Occupation: Ballet dancer
- Years active: 1995-present
- Spouse: Justin Meissner
- Career
- Current group: The Royal Ballet

Laura Morera is a Spanish ballet dancer who was a principal dancer with The Royal Ballet until her retirement in 2023.

== Early life and training ==
Morera was born in Madrid. She started attending the Royal Academy of Dance's summer programme in London at the age of seven. When she was 10, she auditioned for The Royal Ballet School by dancing a solo from Paquita in pointe shoes. She graduated in 1995.

== Career ==
Morera joined The Royal Ballet after graduating from the school. She became a First Artist in 1998, Soloist in 1999, First Soloist in 2002 and Principal Dancer in 2007. She has performed lead roles in ballets such as, the titular role in Giselle, the Sugar Plum Fairy in The Nutcracker, Natalia Petrovna in Ashton's A Month in the Country, the Gypsy Girl in The Two Pigeons, the title role in Manon, Mary Vetsera in Mayerling, the title role in Anastasia and Tatiana in Cranko's Onegin. She won the 2015 Critics' Circle National Dance Award for her performance as Lise in Ashton's La Fille mal gardée and the 2023 National Dance Award for Best Female Dancer.

Outside of the company, Morera and her husband and former Royal Ballet dancer Justin Meissner have a group named Dance Tour International which has held gala and workshops in different countries.

== Selected repertoire ==
Morera's repertoire with the Royal Ballet includes:

- Lise in La Fille mal gardée
- The titular role in Anastasia
- Diana in Sylvia
- Gypsy Girl in The Two Pigeons
- Effie in La Sylphide
- Masha and Irena in Winter Dreams
- Tatiana in Onegin
- The titular role in Giselle
- Kitri and Mercedes in Don Quixote
- Sugar Plum Fairy in The Nutcracker
- Gamzatti in La Bayadère
- The title role and Lescaut’s Mistress in Manon
- Mary Vetsera, Mitzi Caspar and Marie Larisch in Mayerling
- The Queen of Hearts in Alice's Adventures in Wonderland
- Paulina in The Winter’s Tale
- Titania in The Dream
- Wife in The Concert

=== Created roles ===
- Rushes – Fragments of a Lost Story
- 'See, even Night herself is here’ pas de deux
- Qualia
- Of Mozart
- Asphodel Meadows
- Sweet Violets
- Hansel and Gretel
- The Age of Anxiety
- Electric Counterpoint
- Frankenstein
- Tryst
- Mama Elena in Like Water for Chocolate
