= John Lanchbery =

English ballet conductor and composer

John 'Jack' Arthur Lanchbery OBE
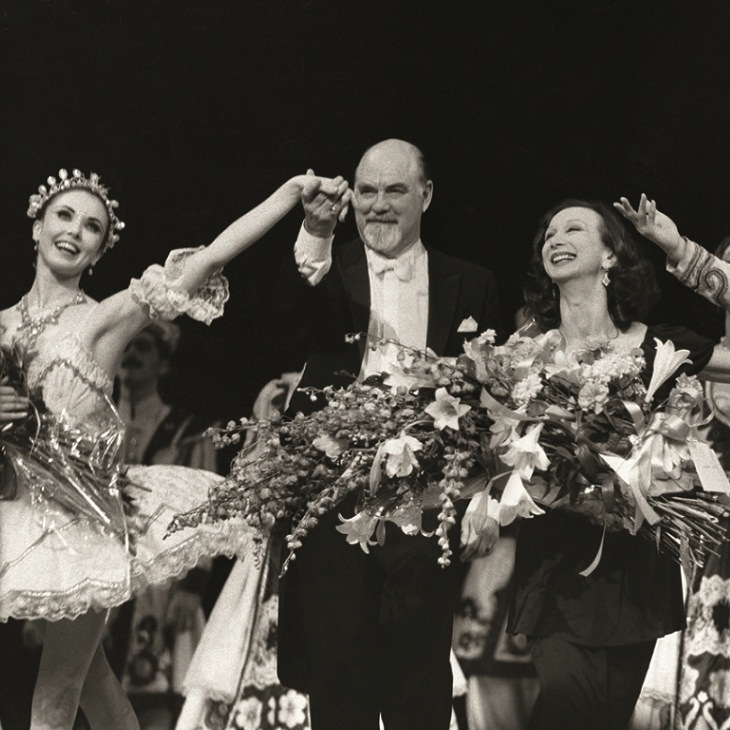
- Christine Walsh, Lanchbery, and Maina Gielgud, 1988.
- Born: 15 May 1923; London, England
- Died: 27 February 2003 (aged 79); Melbourne, Australia
- Education: Alleyn's School
- Occupations: Ballet Conductor; Composer
- Known for: Principal Conductor of the Royal Ballet (1959 to 1972); Principal Conductor of The Australian Ballet (1972 to 1977); Musical Director of the American Ballet Theatre (1978 to 1980)
- Spouse: Elaine Fifield (Married 1951. Divorced 1960)
- Partner: Thomas Han
- Musical career
- Genre: Ballet
- Instruments: Conductor; Keyboard.
- Years active: 1942 - 2001
- Military career
- Allegiance: United Kingdom
- Branch: Royal Armoured Corps
- Service years: Second World War

John 'Jack' Arthur Lanchbery (15 May 1923 – 27 February 2003) was an English conductor and composer who was known for his ballet arrangements, and for his ballet adaptations of non-ballet musical works.

He was the principal conductor of the Royal Ballet from 1959 to 1972, principal conductor of The Australian Ballet from 1972 to 1977, and musical director of the American Ballet Theatre from 1978 to 1980. He conducted for the Royal Ballet until 2001.

Rudolf Nureyev said that Lanchbery was "a conductor and music director of unmatched experience" who was "directly responsible for raising the status and the standards of musical performance". Maina Gielgud stated that he were "the finest conductor for dance of his generation and probably well beyond". One critic wrote that "the music was always on its best behaviour" when Lanchbery was conducting.

== Early life ==
Lanchbery was born in London on 15 May 1923, and began violin lessons and music composition when he was eight years of age. He was educated at Alleyn's School, where he formed a lifetime friendship with the renowned chorister Peter Stanley Lyons, and with Kenneth Spring, who was the founder of the National Youth Theatre and whose composer mother encouraged Lanchbery's musical talent. He was also a friend of Tchaikovsky's grandniece and translator Galina von Meck (1891–1985).

Lanchbery was in 1942 awarded the Henry Smart Composition Scholarship to the Royal Academy of Music, where he studied under Sir Henry Wood until the Second World War, during which he served in the Royal Armoured Corps, after which he returned to the Royal Academy of Music to study for two more years before he returned to his alma mater Alleyn's School to teach music. He was declined the job of director of music at Alleyn's School, and subsequently worked for a music publisher. He was a member of the Garrick Club.

== Musical career ==
=== Conductor of London Metropolitan Ballet and Sadler's Wells Theatre Ballet: 1948–1959 ===
Lanchbery was recommended to apply for the post of conductor of the Metropolitan Ballet. He obtained the position and made his debut with them at Edinburgh in 1948. Two years later the orchestra collapsed for lack of funds. However, working with choreographer Celia Franca, Lanchbery wrote The Eve of St Agnes (the story was based on John Keats' poem of the same name), one of the first commissioned ballets to be shown on BBC television. He composed film scores for Eric Robinson before joining the Sadler's Wells Theatre Ballet (later the Royal Ballet touring company) in 1951, with whom he proceeded to orchestrate, in 1953, the first professional ballet choreographed by Kenneth MacMillan: Somnambulism whose music was composed with music by Stan Kenton. Lanchbery also orchestrated The House of Birds (La Casa de los Pájaros) in 1955, with original music by Federico Mompou.

=== Principal Conductor of Royal Ballet: 1959–1972 ===
Lanchbery served as principal conductor of the Royal Ballet from 1959 from 1972. He arranged the music for the ballet La fille mal gardée, to choreography by Frederick Ashton, for the Royal Ballet in 1960. The pastiche score for Ashton's La fille mal gardée included music by Donizetti, Martini, Rossini, and Peter-Ludwig Hertel, as well as material composed by Lanchbery himself. The music for the famous Clog Dance, originally by Hertel, was used for many years as a theme tune for Home This Afternoon on BBC radio. In 1960 the dancer Rudolf Nureyev staged The Kingdom of the Shades scene from Marius Petipa's ballet La Bayadère for the Royal Ballet, and Lanchbery was commissioned to create a new arrangement of Ludwig Minkus's music.

In addition to the revenue from his recordings, Lanchbery had his income supplemented by the copyright he earned from his orchestral arrangements, which were used by ballet companies all over the world. With Ashton, he composed The Two Pigeons; A Month in the Country; The Dream; and one of the most critically acclaimed ballet versions of A Midsummer Night's Dream.

In 1966 Rudolf Nureyev asked Lanchbery to reorchestrate Ludwig Minkus's score for the ballet Don Quixote.

Although he resigned from the position of director of the Royal Ballet in 1972, he continued to conduct regularly for the company until 2001.

=== Principal Conductor of The Australian Ballet: 1972–1977 ===
Notable successes for Lanchbery included the arrangement of the Liszt music for Kenneth MacMillan's stormy multi-act Mayerling, which premiered at Covent Garden in 1978; and the arrangement of Franz Lehár's score for the first full-length ballet production of The Merry Widow, for The Australian Ballet in 1976. In 1971, he composed the music for the ballet film The Tales of Beatrix Potter. His sources were varied, including the operas of Michael William Balfe and Arthur Sullivan. He also arranged the music and conducted the orchestra for Nijinsky in 1980.

Lanchbery was the first composer to successfully convert operas into ballets (The Tales of Hoffmann, The Merry Widow, Die Fledermaus), and he also wrote music for some British films of the 1950s, including Deadly Nightshade (1953) and Colonel March Investigates (1955). He was involved in The Turning Point (1977), starring Mikhail Baryshnikov and Leslie Browne, and his score for Evil Under the Sun (1982) was based on songs by Cole Porter, a memorable rendition of "You're The Top" by Diana Rigg. He also wrote scores for two classic silent films: D. W. Griffith's The Birth of a Nation and John Ford's The Iron Horse.

During a 1976 visit to Australia, Lanchbery conducted the 27th Intervarsity Choral Festival choir's performance of Rossini's Petite messe solennelle and Gaudeamus igitur in Hobart.

=== Director of American Ballet Theatre: 1978–1980 ===
The American Ballet Theatre used 14 Lanchbery arrangements between 1962 and 2002: he was the musical director of the company between 1978 and 2002. Their productions included his arrangement, for Natalia Makarova, Minkus's La Bayadère in 1980. Lanchbery arranged more than 30 pieces by Franz Liszt for Macmillan's Mayerling, which premiered at Covent Garden in 1978. Nureyev staged the full-length La Bayadère for the Paris Opera Ballet in 1992, which was his final production before his death. Nureyev's version used Minkus's original orchestration, which Nureyev had photocopied from the Mariinsky Theatre's library. However, the poor photocopying required Lanchbery, whom Nureyev considered to be the greatest ballet conductor of his time, to interpolate the passages of the score that were missing, in accordance with his conception of Minkus's original intentions.

In addition to London, Australia, and Sweden, Lanchbery was a guest conductor at many of the world's leading opera houses, including Paris, Stockholm, Rio de Janeiro, New York, and Houston. He also toured Japan, Russia, and China.

== International reputation ==
Lanchbery was widely considered (including by Rudolf Nureyev) to be the greatest ballet-conductor of his time, and to be "a conductor and music director of unmatched experience" who was "directly responsible for raising the status and the standards of musical performance".

Maina Gielgud, artistic director of The Australian Ballet, stated that he was "the finest conductor for dance of his generation and probably well beyond". One critic wrote that "the music was always on its best behaviour" when Lanchbery was conducting.

Lanchbery was the first non-Soviet conductor to receive the Bolshoi Medal. He also received the Carina Ari Medal of Sweden and the Queen Elizabeth II Coronation Award, which was Britain's highest award for ballet. In 1990, he was appointed an Officer of the Order of the British Empire.

== Personal life ==
Lanchbery married the Australian-born Elaine Fifield (d. 1999), who was a principal of Sadler's Wells Ballet, in 1951, but their marriage was dissolved in 1960. They had a daughter, Margaret Lanchbery, who lived in Melbourne and survived both of her parents.

Lanchbery became an Australian citizen in 2002, and resided in Melbourne, where he died of cancer on 27 February 2003. He was also survived by his gay companion Thomas Han.

== Works ==
Some of the most popular ballet-scores are arrangements of non-ballet music. Lanchbery was the most successful adapter of non-ballet music for ballet:

- Title – original composer
- The Tales of Beatrix Potter – Michael William Balfe and others, but also included much original music by Lanchbery
- The Hunchback of Notre Dame – Hector Berlioz
- A Month in the Country – Frédéric Chopin
- Peer Gynt – Edvard Grieg (based on his Peer Gynt incidental music)
- La fille mal gardée – Ferdinand Hérold
- Somnambulism – Stan Kenton
- The Merry Widow – Franz Lehár
- Mayerling – Franz Liszt
- Dracula – Liszt
- The Dream – Felix Mendelssohn
- Don Quixote – Ludwig Minkus
- La Bayadère – Minkus
- Grand Pas Classique from Paquita – Minkus
- House of Birds – Federico Mompou
- The Tales of Hoffmann – Jacques Offenbach
- Le Papillon – Offenbach
- Cleopatra – Nikolai Rimsky-Korsakov
- Monotones – Erik Satie
- Rosalinda – Johann Strauss II (based on Die Fledermaus)
- Designs with Strings – Pyotr Ilyich Tchaikovsky (based on his Piano Trio in A minor)
- The Snow Maiden – Tchaikovsky
