= Mayerling (ballet) =

Ballet by Kenneth MacMillan

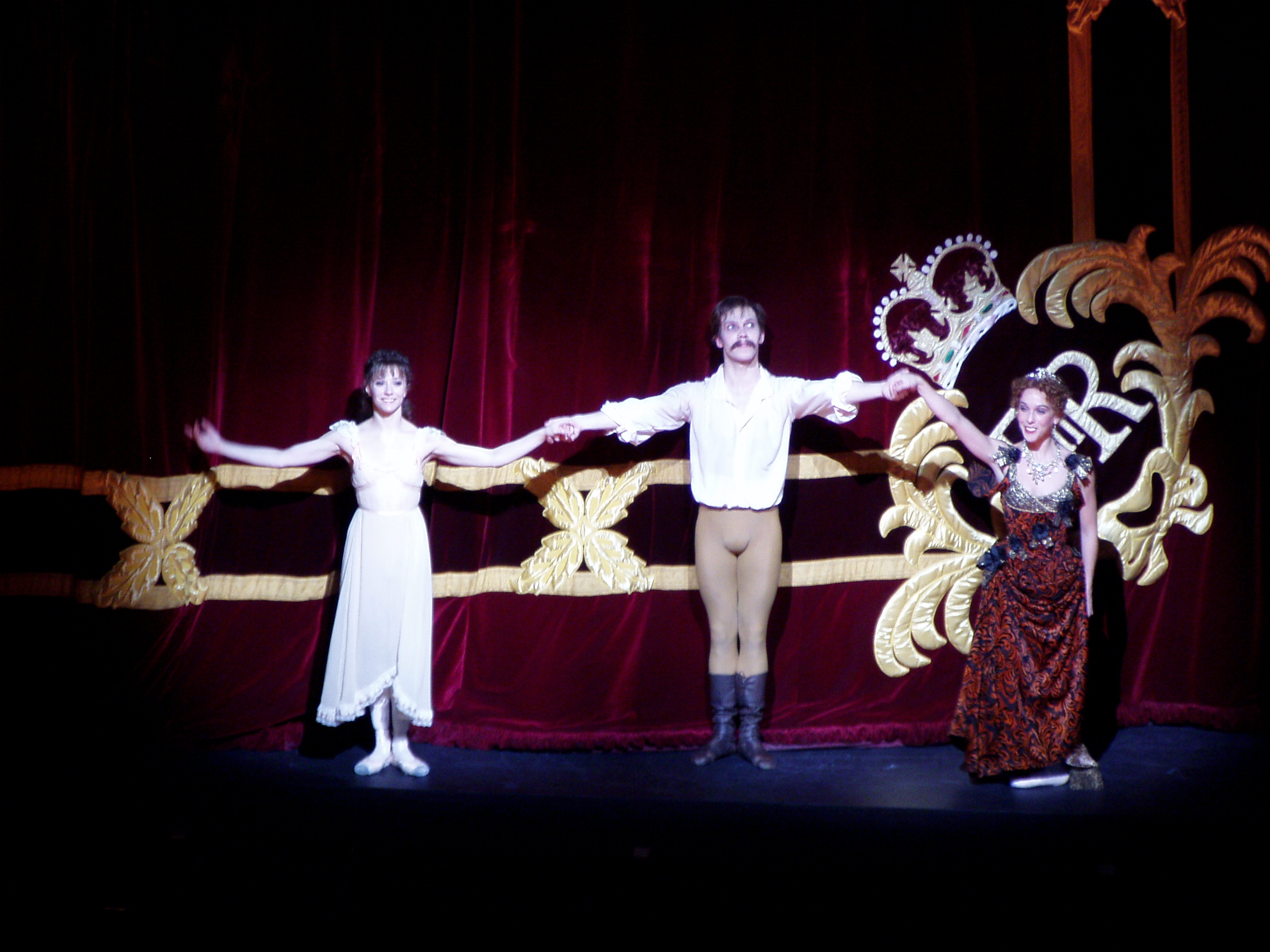
- Alina Cojocaru, Johan Kobborg and Laura Morera at the curtain call of Mayerling
- Choreographer: Kenneth MacMillan
- Music: Franz Liszt, arranged by John Lanchbery
- Premiere: 14 February 1978; Royal Opera House
- Original ballet company: Royal Ballet
- Setting: Austria
- Genre: Neoclassical ballet
- Type: classical ballet

Mayerling is a ballet choreographed by Kenneth MacMillan to the music of Franz Liszt, arranged by John Lanchbery, scenario by Gillian Freeman and designed by Nicholas Georgiadis. The ballet is based on the Mayerling incident, a series of events surrounding the apparent murder–suicide of Rudolf, Crown Prince of Austria (21 August 1858 – 30 January 1889) and his lover, Baroness Mary Vetsera (19 March 1871 – 30 January 1889). The ballet premiered on 14 February 1978, at the Royal Opera House, danced by The Royal Ballet, with David Wall as Prince Rudolf and Lynn Seymour as Vetsera.

== Synopsis ==
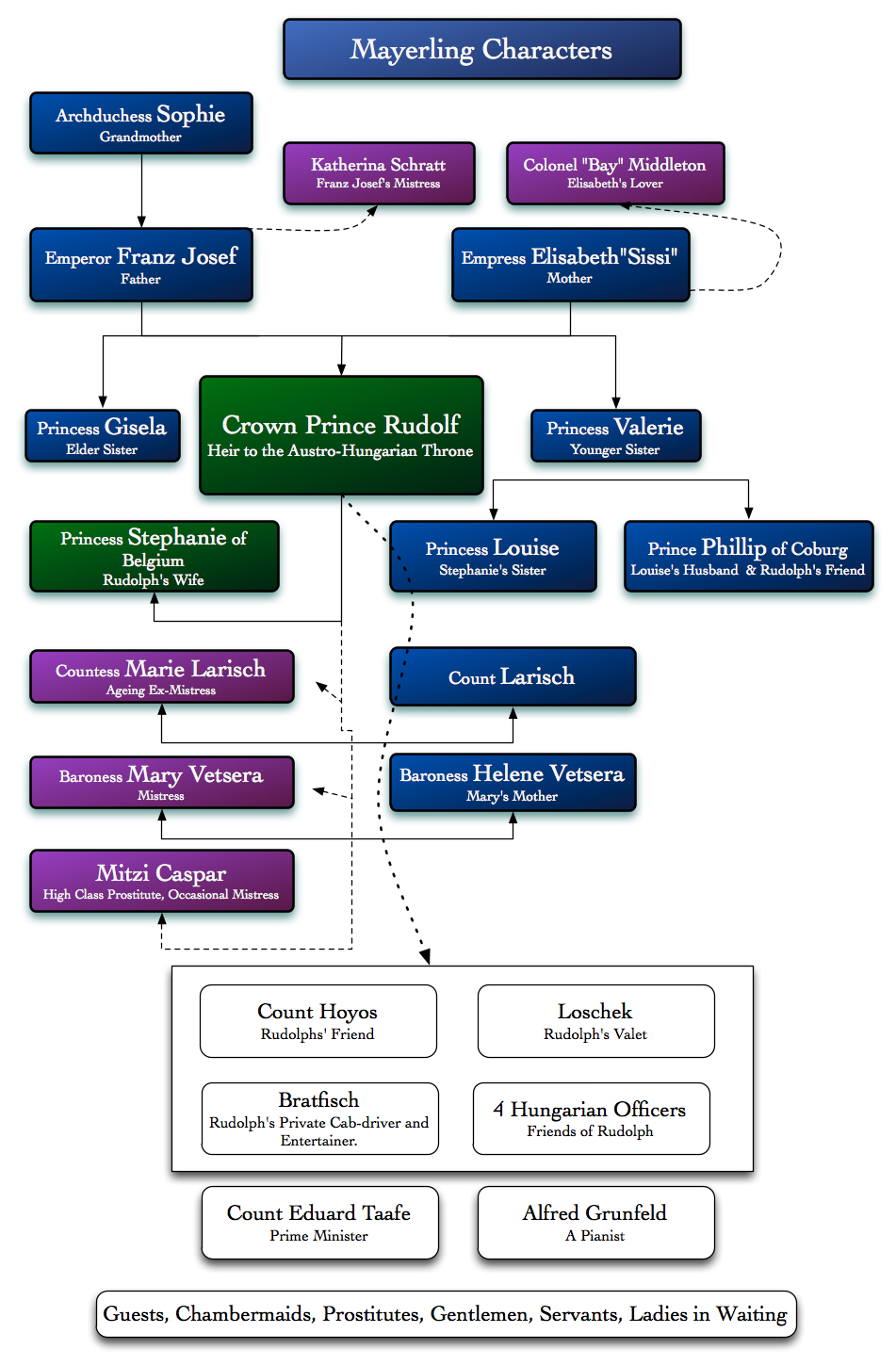
Characters from Kenneth MacMillan's Mayerling, via The Ballet Bag

Prologue: The cemetery at Heiligenkreuz before dawn

=== Act I ===
Scene 1: The ballroom at the Hofburg Palace, Vienna

A ball to celebrate the marriage of Crown Prince Rudolf of Austria-Hungary and Princess Stephanie of Belgium is in full swing. Rudolf flirts shamelessly with Stephanie's sister, Princess Louise, offending both his new bride and his parents, Emperor Franz Josef and Empress Elisabeth. Rudolf meets Countess Marie Larisch, a former mistress, and Baroness Vetsera. The Baroness introduces her 17-year-old daughter Mary Vetsera. Four Hungarian officers, friends of Rudolf, enter and forcefully argue the separatist cause of their country. Countess Larisch tries to rekindle her relationship with Rudolf. The pair are discovered by the Emperor, who demands that Rudolf return to his wife.

Scene 2: The Empress’s apartments at the Hofburg

Having retired from the ball, Empress Elisabeth is being attended by her ladies-in-waiting. Rudolf visits his mother, on his way to his new bride. He expresses his deep unhappiness at being pressured into marriage. Desperate for maternal affection he tries to embrace the Empress, only to be coldly rebuffed.

Scene 3: Rudolf’s apartments at the Hofburg

Princess Stephanie is getting ready for her wedding night. Rudolf enters and threatens Stephanie with a revolver before taking her forcibly.

=== Act II ===
Scene 1: A notorious tavern

Rudolf and Stephanie enter the tavern in disguise. They are accompanied by Rudolf's driver Bratfisch, who attempts to lighten Stephanie's spirits. Prostitutes compete for the men's attention and Stephanie flees the tavern in disgust. Rudolf turns his attention to his Hungarian friends and his regular mistress, the courtesan Mitzi Kaspar. The police burst in and Rudolf, Mitzi and the Hungarian officers hide. The police arrest several people before leaving. In a despairing mood, Rudolf proposes a suicide pact to Mitzi. The Prime Minister Count Taaffe enters the tavern, looking for Rudolf. Rudolf hides again but Mitzi tells the Count where he is hidden. The Count and Mitzi leave together.

Scene 2: Outside the tavern

Countess Larisch, ostensibly chaperoning Mary, presents the young girl to Rudolf as he leaves the tavern.

Scene 3: The Vetsera house

Countess Larisch calls on her friend Baroness Vetsera. She finds Mary absorbed by a portrait of Rudolf. Countess Larisch tells Mary's fortune using a pack of cards and informs her that her romantic dreams will come true. Mary gives the Countess a letter to deliver to Rudolf on her behalf.

Scene 4: The Hofburg

During the Emperor's birthday celebrations Count Taaffe confronts Rudolf over an incriminating political pamphlet on the Hungarian cause. Colonel 'Bay' Middleton hands the Count a joke cigar, to Rudolf's intense amusement. The Empress presents the Emperor with a portrait of his 'friend' Katherina Schratt. A firework display distracts everyone except the Empress and 'Bay.' Rudolf notices their amorous exchange and becomes bitterly resentful. Following a performance by Schratt and the pianist Alfred Grünfeld, Countess Larisch produces Mary's letter and teases Rudolf with it.

Scene 5: Rudolf’s apartments at the Hofburg

Mary and Rudolf meet in secret for the first time.

=== Act III ===
Scene 1: A royal shoot in the countryside

During a hunting expedition, Rudolf unaccountably shoots wildly. He kills a member of the court, narrowly missing his father.

Scene 2: Rudolf’s apartments at the Hofburg

The Empress discovers Countess Larisch and Rudolf alone together and angrily dismisses the Countess, unaware Mary is waiting outside. Mary enters after the Empress has left. Rudolf asks her to commit suicide with him.

Scene 3: The hunting lodge at Mayerling

Rudolf shares a drink with Count Hoyos and Prince Philipp of Coburg, attended by his valet Loschek. He asks them to leave, saying he is unwell. Bratfisch enters with Mary. Rudolf instructs Bratfisch to entertain him and Mary. Bratfisch, soon realizing he has lost their attention, leaves. In a mounting frenzy Rudolf has sex with Mary. He injects himself with morphine to calm his nerves and embraces Mary for the last time. He shoots her. Loschek, Hoyos and Philipp rush in, having heard the shot. Rudolf reassures them and instructs them to leave. Alone, he shoots himself. His friends rush in again, and collapse in despair when they find Rudolf's dead body.

Epilogue: The cemetery at Heiligenkreuz before dawn

== Original production ==
Mayerling was first produced for the Royal Ballet in 1978, by the British choreographer Sir Kenneth MacMillan, with a scenario written by Gillian Freeman, scenery and costume designs by Nicholas Georgiadis and lighting design by David Hersey. Music for the ballet was compiled from existing works by Franz Liszt, arranged and orchestrated by John Lanchbery who also conducted the orchestra during the ballet's first season. The ballet was dedicated to the Royal Ballet's founder choreographer Sir Frederick Ashton and premiered at the Royal Opera House, London, on 14 February 1978. The Royal Opera House collections have archive information from twelve performances of this ballet, including the premiere and subsequent revivals.

MacMillan died of a heart attack on 29 October 1992, backstage at Covent Garden at a revival of Mayerling.

=== Critical reception ===
The original production was, in general, well received by critics, however there were some reservations. Many reviewers found the ballet overly long and the historical background of the story difficult to follow. However, Mary Clarke in the Guardian defended the complexity of the work: "Easy, after one or two viewings, to say this or that scene must go. But patience and understanding bring rewards; every scene tells something about Rudolf and the Court of Vienna in his time."

== Other productions ==
In 2013, Stanislavsky Ballet danced Mayerling for the first time, with Sergei Polunin as Rudolf.

In 2017, Houston Ballet became the first North American company to perform Mayerling. The performance came shortly after Hurricane Harvey, which led to the company switching theatre. Connor Walsh danced Rudolf on the opening night.

In 2019, Stuttgart Ballet presented a new productions, with new sets and costumes by German designer Jürgen Rose It was the first time that Mayerling was performed in different sets and costumes. Friedemann Vogel was cast as Rudolf.

The Paris Opera Ballet was originally scheduled to debut Mayerling in May 2020, but the performances had to be cancelled due to the coronavirus pandemic. It was postponed to the autumn of 2022, with Hugo Marchand dancing Rudolf on the opening night.

In 2021, Polish National Ballet, Polish premiere, stagers: Karl Burnett and Wayne Eagling. Vladimir Yaroshenko danced Rudolf on the opening night.

In 2022, Scottish Ballet opened an adapted version of the ballet named The Scandal at Mayerling. Two scenes are omitted from this production: Emperor Franz Joseph’s birthday party and the imperial shooting party. New sets and costumes were designed by Elin Steele, and historian Lucy Coatman was interviewed in the program. Evan Loudon danced Rudolf on the opening night, with Sophie Martin as Mary Vetsera.

== Casts ==
Role	Character Description	World premiere by The Royal Ballet (1978)	New York premiere by The Royal Ballet (1983)	Moscow premiere by The Royal Ballet (2003)	Vienna State Ballet premiere (2008)	Moscow Stanislavsky Theatre premiere (2013)	Houston Ballet premiere (2017)	Stuttgart Ballet premiere (2019)	Polish National Ballet premiere, Warsaw (2021)	Paris Opera Ballet Premiere (2022)
Crown Prince Rudolf	Crown Prince of Austria-Hungary	David Wall	David Wall	Irek Mukhamedov	Robert Tewsley	Sergei Polunin	Connor Walsh	Friedemann Vogel	Vladimir Yaroshenko	Hugo Marchand
Baroness Mary Vetsera	Mistress of Crown Prince Rudolph	Lynn Seymour	Lesley Collier	Mara Galeazzi	Irina Tsymbal	Anna Ol	Karina Gonzalez	Elisa Badenes	Chinara Alizade	Dorothée Gilbert
Princess Stephanie	Wife of Crown Prince Rudolph	Wendy Ellis	Wendy Ellis	Laura Morera	Marija Kicevska	Anastasia Limenko	Melody Mennite	Diana Ionescu	Mai Kageyama	Silvia Saint-Martin
Emperor Franz Josef of Austria-Hungary	Father of Crown Prince Rudolph	Michael Somes	Michael Somes	David Drew		Alexei Karasev		Egon Madsen	Walery Mazepczyk	Yann Chailloux
Empress Elisabeth	Mother of Crown Prince Rudolph	Georgina Parkinson	Monica Mason	Nicola Tranah	Brenda Saleh	Natalia Krapivina	Jessica Collado	Miriam Kacerova	Rosa Pierro	Laura Hecquet
Countess Marie Larisch	Lady in waiting to Empress Elizabeth and former mistress of Crown Prince Rudolph	Merle Park	Merle Park	Genesia Rosato	Ketevan Papava	Anastasia Pershenkova	Sara Webb	Alicia Amatriain	Yuka Ebihara	Hannah O'Neill
Archduchess Sophie	Mother of Emperor Franz Josef	Julie Wood	Julie Wood	Gail Taphouse	Karina Sarkissova			Marcia Haydée	Renata Smukała	
Bratfisch	Private cab driver to Crown Prince Rudolph, also a popular entertainer	Graham Fletcher	Graham Fletcher	Ricardo Cervera	Mihail Sosnovschi	Dmitry Zagrebin	Christopher Gray	Adhonay Soares da Silva	Rinaldo Venuti	Marc Moreau
Mitzi Kaspar	A high-class prostitute, Crown Prince Rudolph's regular mistress	Laura Connor	Rosalyn Whitten	Marianela Nuñez	Karina Sarkissova	Oksana Kardash	Yuriko Kajiya	Anna Osadcenko	Palina Rusetskaya	Valentine Colasante
George "Bay" Middleton	Empress Elisabeth's lover	David Drew	David Drew	Christopher Saunders	Eno Peçi	Mikhail Pukhov	Ian Casady	Roman Novitzky	Wojciech Ślęzak	

== Videography ==
ITV's Mayerling, a television program showing the ballet's creation and production, won the Prix Italia.

The Royal Ballet released three DVDs of Mayerling. The first, recorded in 1994 and released in 2008, featured Irek Mukhamedov as Crown Prince Rudolf, Viviana Durante as Baroness Mary Vetsera, Lesley Collier as Countess Marie Larisch and Darcey Bussell as Mitzi Caspar. Another DVD, recorded in 2009 and released in 2010, starred Edward Watson as Crown Prince Rudolf and Mara Galeazzi as Baroness Mary Vetsera. The most recent one, released in 2019, with Steven McRae as Crown Prince Rudolf, Sarah Lamb as Baroness Mary Vetsera, Laura Morera as Countess Marie Larisch, Kristen McNally as Empress Elisabeth, Meaghan Grace Hinkis as Princess Stephanie and Mayara Magri as Mitzi Caspar. The recording with McRae was broadcast on BBC Four in 2020.

In addition, In light of the impact of the COVID-19 coronavirus pandemic on the performing arts, Stuttgart Ballet released a recording of a performance online, with Friedemann Vogel as Crown Prince Rudolf, Elisa Badenes as Baroness Mary Vetsera, Alicia Amatriain as Countess Marie Larisch, Miriam Kacerova as Empress Elisabeth and Adonhay Soares da Silva as Bratfisch.

== See also ==
- List of historical ballet characters
- Cultural depictions of Empress Elisabeth of Austria
