= Anastasia (ballet) =

Ballet by Kenneth MacMillan

Anastasia is a ballet created by Kenneth MacMillan. The first version in one act was premiered in 1967 by the Deutsche Oper Ballet. In 1971 MacMillan expanded the work to three acts for the Royal Ballet; the original one-act version became the final act of the 1971 work.

The 1967 version uses Bohuslav Martinů's Symphony No. 6 (1953) and untitled electronic music by Fritz Winckel and Rüdiger Rüfer. The three-act version also used Tchaikovsky's Symphony No. 1 and Symphony No. 3.

The ballet is based on the story of Anna Anderson, who purported to be the Grand Duchess Anastasia Nikolaevna of Russia. After MacMillan's death, DNA tests showed that Anderson was unrelated to the Russian imperial family, but at the time the ballet was created many, including MacMillan, were inclined to accept that she might be the lost Grand Duchess. Anderson was confined for a time to a mental institution in Berlin in 1920. The 1967 ballet depicts her there, painfully attempting to recover her memory. The first two acts of the 1971 version show Anastasia's life (or Anderson's mental image of it) in her privileged surroundings before the Russian Revolution. MacMillan chose Tchaikovsky's music for these acts, to provide a dramatic contrast with the musique concrète and the edgy Martinů score in the third act.

The first performance of the single-act version was given at the Deutsche Oper, Berlin on 25 June 1967. The title role of Anastasia/Anderson was danced by Lynn Seymour. The three-act version was premiered by the Royal Ballet at the Royal Opera House, Covent Garden on 22 July 1971. Barry Kay designed costumes and scenery for both productions. After MacMillan's death the ballet was revived, with minor changes, under the supervision of his widow Deborah MacMillan in May 1996. New costumes and scenery were designed by Bob Crowley. In that, and later revivals, the title role was performed by Viviana Durante, Leanne Benjamin, Gillian Revie, Mara Galeazzi, Lauren Cuthbertson, Laura Morera, and Natalia Osipova.

== Original cast (one-act version) ==
Deutsche Oper, Berlin, 25 June 1967

- Lynn Seymour
- Rudolf Holz
- Vergie Derman
- Gerhard Bohner

== Original cast (three-act version) ==
Royal Opera House, Covent Garden, 22 July 1971:

- Lynn Seymour
- Svetlana Beriosova
- Antoinette Sibley
- Derek Rencher
- Anthony Dowell
- Gerd Larsen
- Vergie Derman
- Jennifer Penney
- Lesley Collier
- Marilyn Trounson
- David Wall
- Michael Coleman
- Adrian Grater

== Videography ==
The 2016 production, starring Natalia Osipova, Marianela Nuñez, Federico Bonelli, Edward Watson, Thiago Soares, Christina Arestis and Christopher Saunders was released on a DVD. In light of the COVID-19 coronavirus pandemic and its impacts on the performing arts, the Royal Opera House released the recording online.

== See also ==
- List of historical ballet characters
