= Gillian Revie =

British ballerina (born 1969)

Gillian Revie Macleod
- Born: 1969 or 1970; Northern Ireland
- Occupation: Ballet dancer
- Website: Official website

Gillian Revie Macleod is a British ballerina. She was formerly a first soloist and later principal guest artist at the Royal Ballet, Covent Garden. She went on to start her own ballet school in Sydney called Classical Ballet 121, closing in 2021.

== Early life ==
Revie was born in either 1969 or 1970 in Bangor, County Down, Northern Ireland. She began dancing at the age of three.

== Career ==
Revie trained at the Royal Ballet School and joined the Royal Ballet company in 1987, where she worked for over two decades, undertaking roles such as Sugar Plum Fairy in The Nutcracker, Mary in Mayerling, Anastasia, and Manon.

In 2000, she became the first recipient of the Award for Outstanding Achievement in Dance Performance at Dance Northern Ireland's black-tie Gala Night Celebration.
