= Calvin Richardson (dancer) =

Australian ballet dancer

Calvin Richardson is an Australian ballet dancer and a principal dancer with The Royal Ballet.

Richardson grew up in Traralgon, Australia

He trained at The Royal Ballet School and joined the Company in 2014.

He was promoted to first artist in 2017, soloist in 2018, first soloist in 2021, and principal in 2024.
