= Monotones (ballet) =

Monotones is a one-act ballet in two parts choreographed by Frederick Ashton to music by Erik Satie.

Monotones II was created first as a gala piece for a gala performance in aid of the Royal Ballet Benevolent Fund in 1965. Ashton had long been inspired by the Gymnopedies by Erik Satie of 1888 and took orchestrations by Claude Debussy and Roland-Manuel as the basis of a pas de trois for two men and one woman. The premiere was on 24 March 1965 with Vyvyan Lorrayne, Anthony Dowell, and Robert Mead.

The piece was a great success – so much so that in 1966 Ashton enlarged the piece so that it would be long enough to be performed in the normal repertory, by the addition of Monotones I, which formed an overture to the earlier work. This piece in many ways forms a mirror image of Monotones II. Based on Satie's Gnossiennes, it is another pas de trois, but in this case for two women and one man; the premiere was given by Antoinette Sibley, Georgina Parkinson, and Brian Shaw.

Ashton took his cues in choreographing the ballet from the form, structure and inspiration of Satie's music. The ternary structure of the Gymnopedies and Gnossiennes supports what has been referred to as a "trinitarian obsession" of Ashton's. The two sections of the work also represent a contrast between the earthiness of the Gnossiennes in Monotones I – where the characters wear green costumes, engage in weighty and accented lunges, and shield their eyes from the sun – and the celestial, infinite and seamless qualities of the Gymnopedies in Monotones II, where the dancers are white-costumed, lit from above, and perform suspended arabesques, the men lifting the woman to "walk on air."

The work uses classical language in its choreography and, like his Symphonic Variations, represents a pinnacle of Ashton's own classicism.

== Sources ==
- Cohen, Selma Jeanne. International Encyclopedia of Dance, Vol 1. Oxford University Press, Oxford, 2004.
- Jordan, Stephanie. "Ashton and Satie". Programme of 12 February 2013. London: Royal Opera House.
- Kavanagh, Julie (1996). Secret Muses: The Life of Frederick Ashton. London: Faber and Faber.
- Vaughan, David (1999). Frederick Ashton and his ballets. London: Dance Books.
