= Eno Peçi =

Albanian dancer

Eno Peçi is an Albanian male ballet dancer, living in Austria.

== Biography ==
Born in Tirana, Albania, he was educated at the Tirana Academy of Ballet and the Ballet School of the Vienna State Opera. He joined the Vienna State Opera in 2000, becoming a Demi-soloist in 2003. He is recognised as the first Albanian dancer to perform live in concert in Vienna. In 2009 he was appointed soloist of the Ballett der Wiener Staatsoper und Volksoper (renamed Wiener Staatsballett in 2010). He began his career as a choreographer in 2009.

== Awards and honors ==
He was appointed to be an honourable ambassador of the Republic of Albania in 2008. In 2017 he received "The Key of Tirana." The president of Albania bestowed him with the "Knight of the Order of Skanderbeg" title. On December 13, 2019 he received the "Österreichisches Ehrenkreuz für Wissenschaft und Kunst“.
