= Natalia Roslavleva =

Soviet dance historian (1907–1977)

- Born: 1907; Moscow
- Died: 1977 (aged 69–70); Moscow
- Occupation: Historian, critic, translator, theatre critic, theatrologist

Natalia Petrovna Roslavleva was the pseudonym of Natalia Petrovna René (1907–1977), a Soviet dance historian and critic.

== Life ==
Natalia René was born in 1907 in Kyiv, Ukraine. She attended the Lunacharsky State Institute for Theatre Arts in Moscow.

Writing for the journal Ballet Today in the 1940s, she chose the name Natalia Roslavleva in hommage to the Russian dancer Lyubov Roslavleva (1874–1904).

Roslavleva died of cancer in Moscow on January 3, 1977.

== Works ==
- The "Beryozka" State Dance Company. Moscow: Foreign Languages Pub. House, 1960.
- Stanislavski and the ballet. New York: Dance Perspectives, 1965.
- Era of the Russian Ballet 1770–1965. London: Victor Gollancz, 1966.
- Prechistenka 20: the Isadora Duncan School in Moscow. New York: Dance Perspectives, 1975
