= Antoinette Sibley =

British ballerina

Dame Antoinette Sibley DBE (born 27 February 1939) is a British prima ballerina. She joined the Royal Ballet from the Royal Ballet School in 1956 and became a soloist in 1960. She was celebrated for her partnership with Anthony Dowell. After her retirement from dancing in 1989 she became President of the Royal Academy of Dance in 1991, and guest coach at the Royal Ballet (1991) and Governor, Royal Ballet Board (2000).

== Early years ==
Sibley was born in the London suburb of Bromley, the daughter of Edward G Sibley and his wife Winfred, née Smith. She was educated at the Arts Educational Schools and the Royal Ballet School. Her first appearance on the stage was as a swan in Swan Lake in January 1956, when still a student. In July of the same year she joined the Royal Ballet company.

Initially Sibley had small roles such as a friend of Swanhilda in Coppélia and Red Riding Hood in Sleeping Beauty. Joan Lawson in The Dancing Times wrote of Sibley's dancing, "lyrical qualities and beautifully flowing line". On 21 March 1959 Dame Ninette de Valois, artistic director of the Royal Ballet, allowed Sibley to undertake her first major role, at a matinée at the Royal Opera House. Sibley was cast as Swanhilda in Coppelia. During 1959 Sibley had the chance to be tutored by one of the greatest ballerinas of the twentieth century, Tamara Karsavina. Karsavina said to Sibley, "To get the full benefit from battements frappés we must train our muscles to give a quick reaction. This means that the dégagé must be sharp and in the nature of a 'hit out'."

On 24 October 1959, Sibley was unexpectedly allowed to dance the leading role in Swan Lake partnered by the principal dancer, Michael Somes. This was her big break. Tours to the United States and the Soviet Union quickly followed. Natalia Roslavleva, writing in The Ballet Annual, observed of Sibley and the Royal Ballet when dancing in Moscow, "Youthful charm, good technique and engaging personalities do part of the work for these dancers. To become great they will have to invest a lot of sweat and tears in the development of mature stagecraft."

== Major career ==
One of Sibley's first important roles was in Jabez and the Devil (1961), choreographed by Alfred Rodrigues, who was among the earliest to recognize her talents. She danced her first Aurora in The Sleeping Beauty on 27 December 1961, partnered by John Gilpin. The performance was praised: "Her Aurora, already enchanting, promises to be for her generation what Fonteyn's had been to mine." Sir Frederick Ashton's The Dream (1964), a balletic version of Shakespeare's A Midsummer Night's Dream was created for Sibley and the up-and-coming Anthony Dowell. Ashton cast Sibley as Titania and Dowell as Oberon. David Vaughan wrote that the production was "sure of a place in contemporary ballet history if only because it initiated a new partnership, Sibley and Dowell, that was to become second only to Fonteyn and Nureyev in popular esteem ..." Writing of Sibley's performance Vaughan commented, "no-one has managed to emulate Sibley's swiftness and her impersonation of a half-wild creature, nor the silken fluidity of Dowell's phrasing."

Sibley was renowned during her time at the Royal Ballet for her performances in MacMillan's Romeo and Juliet. She also danced the major roles of Odette and Odile in Swan Lake, the title role in Giselle and Aurora in The Sleeping Beauty. Further roles were in Ashton's ballets, Symphonic Variations and Daphnis and Chloe, Jerome Robbins's Dances at a Gathering and Afternoon of a Faun. Sibley also was the ballerina MacMillan used to create the lead in Manon.

Among the other ballets in which Sibley created roles are Monotones, Jazz Calendar, Anastasia, Triad, L’invitation au voyage, Varii Capricci, Fleeting Figures and Enigma Variations. In The Guardian, Mary Clarke said when Sibley first announced her retirement, "Other dancers will inherit the ballerina roles but one small Ashton creation is Sibley's for ever. No-one has, no-one ever will get to the heart of Dorabella in Enigma Variations the way Sibley did. There have been other Swan Queens, Auroras and Giselles but for anyone who saw Sibley dance there is only one Dorabella."

== Retirement ==
Sibley announced her retirement in 1979, but was persuaded to return. She finally retired in 1989, after months of struggling with injury. She took the advice of Karsavina who had said, "leave the stage before the stage leaves you." In retirement she became President of the Royal Academy of Dance in 1991, and guest coach at the Royal Ballet (1991) and Governor, Royal Ballet Board (2000). Now there is a ballet studio named after her at Francis Holland School Sloane Square where there was a night dedicated to her and several portraits of her dancing in The Sleeping Beauty, Afternoon of a Faun and Scenes de Ballet hang in the ballet studio.

== Personal life ==
From 1964 to 1973 Sibley was married to the dancer Michael Somes. After their divorce, in 1974 she married London-based banker, (Richard) Panton Corbett, of a landed gentry family of Longnor, Shropshire, who changed their name from Plymley in 1804 to inherit the estate from their relatives, the Corbet baronets. They have a son and a daughter. He died 17 May 2021 aged 83.
