= Cinderella (Ashton) =

Ballet choreographed by Frederick Ashton

Cinderella ballet – features Antoinette Sibley as Cinderella and Anthony Dowell as The Prince, with Frederick Ashton and Robert Helpmann as the two Ugly Stepsisters (VHS cover).

This version of the Cinderella ballet, using Sergei Prokofiev's Cinderella music and re-choreographed by Frederick Ashton, is a comic ballet.

== Ballet productions ==
Choreography	Frederick Ashton
Music	Sergei Prokofiev
Design	Jean-Denis Malcles (scenery and costumes)
Libretto	Frederick Ashton (after the fairy tale by Charles Perrault)
First production	Sadler's Wells Ballet, Royal Opera House, London, 23 December 1948
Principal dancers	Moira Shearer (Cinderella), Michael Somes (Prince), Frederick Ashton and Robert Helpmann (Stepsisters), Alexander Grant (The Jester)
Other productions	Royal Ballet (new production, restaged and revised by Frederick Ashton); with Margot Fonteyn (Cinderella), David Blair (Prince), Frederick Ashton and Robert Helpmann (Ugly Stepsisters); London, 23 December 1965
First US production	Joffrey Ballet, with Christian Holder and Gary Chryst (Ugly Stepsisters); Roosevelt University's Auditorium Theatre, Chicago, October 2006
Other choreographic treatments of the story	François Albert Decombe (London, 1822); Marius Petipa, Enrico Cecchetti, and Lev Ivanov (St. Petersburg, 1893) see Cinderella (Fitinhof-Schell)

== Plot outline ==
Ashton's Cinderella is his own realised dream of a Petipa ballet and the ballet itself enacts the realisation of dreams, notably Cinderella's own. When we first see her she is a demi-caractere dancer dreaming of being a ballerina—that seems to be the balletic point of her solo with the broomstick in the kitchen—and it is as a ballerina that she magically enters the ballroom, stepping en pointe down the stairs and advancing in pas de bourree to the front of the stage. Back in the kitchen she recalls the slipper (or rather the pointe shoe) that she carries in her apron; the shoe is the clue to her dream and persuades her it was true. The Prince finds Cinderella, but in his arms she discovers her own identity as a ballerina and her dream of herself has been realised. Cinderella's mice design the gown.

== Origins ==
There are many versions of the story of Cinderella (the earliest was written down in China in the 9th century) and it has been the basis for a long list of pantomimes, operas, and ballets.

The earliest Cinderella ballet proper was by Duport in Vienna in 1813, although Drury Lane's Cinderella ten years earlier had a ballet divertissement of Loves and Graces introduced by Venus.

London's first complete Cinderella ballet was seen in 1822, the year Paris first heard Rossini's opera La Cenerentola.

Marius Petipa, Lev Ivanov, and Enrico Cecchetti choreographed Cinderella for the Imperial Mariinsky Theatre in 1893 to the music of Baron Boris Fitinhof-Schell—it was in this splendid production that Pierina Legnani first performed in Russia her celebrated feat of 32 fouettes—but none of the choreography has survived.

Adeline Genée first danced Cinderella at the Empire, Leicester Square, on Twelfth Night 1906, and 29 years later to the day Andrée Howard choreographed her one-act Cinderella (in which Frederick Ashton was the elegant Prince) for Rambert's Ballet Club at the Mercury Theatre, Notting Hill Gate.

== The score ==
Sergei Prokofiev had begun composition on the score for Cinderella in 1941 but, because of the war and his opera War and Peace, the orchestration was not completed until 1944.

The music was choreographed first for the Bolshoi Ballet by Rostislav Zakharov in 1945 and then for the Kirov Ballet by Konstantin Sergeyev in 1946. Olga Lepeshinskaya created Cinderella in Moscow (where Ulanova, who alternated with her, had great success in the role) and Dudinskaya first danced it in Leningrad.

Prokofiev and his collaborators were guided by Perrault's version of the story and by the great Tchaikovsky ballet scores, which themselves served the structure of Petipa's choreography. Prokofiev wrote that he conceived Cinderella (which he dedicated to Tchaikovsky):

... as a classical ballet with variations, adagois, pas de deux, etc... I see Cinderella not only as a fairy-tale character but also as a real person, feeling, experiencing, and moving among us,

and again:

What I wished to express above all in the music of Cinderella was the poetic love of Cinderella and the Prince, the birth and flowering of that love, the obstacles in its path and finally the dream fulfilled.

== Ashton's choreography ==
Frederick Ashton first considered the idea of composing a full-evening ballet as early as 1939, when the Vic-Wells Sleeping Princess had proved so successful, but because of the war these ambitions were shelved.

Early in 1946, though, in a speech at the Soviet Theater Exhibition, de Valois said she could not wait to see the first full-length English classical ballet, and during 1946 and 1947 there were constant rumours of possible three-act ballet scores. At one point Delibes' Sylvia seemed the most likely choice (that came in 1952 and was Ashton's second full-length ballet), but in the late spring of 1948 Prokofiev's Cinderella was selected as the score Ashton would choreograph.

He had heard and liked quite a lot of the Prokofiev music and he thought Perrault's story a good one. In the event, Ashton cut some of the music, notably the third-act scene showing the Prince's journey in search of Cinderella (a pretext for a divertissement of national dances: Ashton's comment on this was "I didn't like any of the places he went to, nor the music he wrote for them") and a shorter dance of Grasshoppers and Dragonflies after the Fairy Summer's variation in the first act. The choreography of Cinderella is Ashton's homage to the classical tradition of Petipa, as had been Symphonic Variations of two years earlier, albeit on a smaller scale. In 1948 Ashton also created Scènes de ballet, which distilled the essence of Petipa's ballets down to just one act.

The choreography of Cinderella is full of dreams, some most definitely unfulfilled. In the ballroom, the put-upon, shy Ugly Sister—significantly Ashton's own role—performs a Petipa figure that amounts to her dream of being Odile at Siegfried's ball or the Sugar Plum Fairy. She is in fact full of choreographic dreams, and that is the clue to her character (as is the fact that she has Edith Sitwell's nose). Again in the ballroom the bossy Ugly Sister does a fish-dive with her suitor, a dream of the final pas de deux in The Sleeping Beauty.

== Sources ==
- Bremster, M. (1993). International Dictionary of Ballet (Vol. 1 and 2). Detroit: St James Press. ISBN 1-55862-084-2
