= L'histoire de Manon =

Ballet premiered in 1974

- Choreographer: Sir Kenneth MacMillan
- Music: Jules Massenet, original orchestration by Leighton Lucas – New orchestration in 2011 by Martin Yates
- Premiere: 1974; Royal Opera House, London
- Original ballet company: Royal Ballet
- Genre: Classical ballet

L'histoire de Manon, generally referred to as Manon, is a ballet choreographed by Kenneth MacMillan to music by Jules Massenet and based on the 1731 novel Manon Lescaut by Abbé Prévost. The ballet was first performed by The Royal Ballet in London in 1974 with Antoinette Sibley and Anthony Dowell in the leading roles. It continues to be performed and recognised internationally.

== Background ==
Kenneth MacMillan had been thinking about choreographing a ballet about the story of Manon Lescaut for some time. Three years into his artistic directorship of The Royal Ballet, he wanted to create a large-scale operatic ballet that would provide exciting roles both for the company's principal dancers and the corps de ballet.

On the last night of the company's summer season in 1973, MacMillan left a copy of Prévost's novel in Antoinette Sibley's dressing room, with a note informing her that it would "come in handy for March 7, '74". As the copy of Manon Lescaut was in a double volume with the novella Carmen by Prosper Mérimée, Sibley asked Anthony Dowell to find out which story was to be turned into a ballet, while she performed onstage in The Sleeping Beauty.

MacMillan began choreographing Manon during the 1973–74 season. He left the title character open to differing dancer interpretations, but was himself sympathetic to her poverty, believing that it was her desire to escape this that underpinned her decisions.

MacMillan used the designs of Nicholas Georgiadis, which reflected the "precarious division between opulence and degradation" with "the stench of poverty ever-present". The ballet's narrative structure is based on that of MacMillan's earlier Romeo and Juliet, with hero and heroine meeting each other as young innocents and their love being revealed through a series of pas de deux.

Critical responses to the opening night performance were mixed. The Guardian newspaper stated, "Basically, Manon is a slut and Des Grieux is a fool and they move in the most unsavoury company", while the Morning Star described the ballet as "an appalling waste of the lovely Antoinette Sibley, who is reduced to a nasty little diamond digger". The opening night audience gave the ballet a standing ovation.

== Synopsis ==
Act I – Paris
Scene 1 – The courtyard of an inn near Paris
The courtyard at the inn is frequented by actresses, gentlemen and the demimonde from Paris. Among them are des Grieux, a young student, the wealthy Monsieur GM, and Lescaut, who is there to meet his sister Manon on her way to enter a convent. A coach arrives bringing Manon and an old gentleman who has been very much attracted to her. Lescaut notices this and takes the gentleman into the inn to come to an arrangement with him over Manon. Manon remains outside and meets des Grieux. They fall in love and decide to escape to Paris with the help of the money that she has stolen from the old gentleman. Lescaut and the old gentleman come out of the inn, having made a bargain, and to their dismay see that Manon has disappeared. Monsieur GM tells Lescaut that he too is interested in Manon and because of this wealth Lescaut promises to find Manon and persuade her to accept GM.

Scene 2 – Des Grieux's lodgings in Paris
Des Grieux is writing a letter to his father but Manon interrupts by declaring her love for him. Des Grieux goes to post the letter and in his absence Lescaut arrives with Monsieur GM. Manon yields to GM's advances and when des Grieux returns, Lescaut persuades him that there will be great wealth for all of them if he, des Grieux, will sanction the liaison between Manon and GM.

Act II
Scene 1 – A party at the hotel particulier of Madame
Manon arrives at the party given by Monsieur GM and is clearly torn between the wealth of her companion and her love for des Grieux, who is also there with Lescaut. Des Grieux tries to persuade Manon to leave with him but she tells him that the time is not right and only will be when he takes more of Monsieur GM's money at cards. Des Grieux is caught cheating and he and Manon rush away.

Scene 2 – Des Grieux's lodgings
Manon and des Grieux once again declare their love for one another but Monsieur GM arrives with the police and Manon is arrested as a prostitute. In the ensuing struggle Lescaut is killed.

Act III – New Orleans
Scene 1 – The port
The gaoler of the penal colony awaits the arrival of the convicts from France. Manon has been deported to America as a prostitute and des Grieux has followed her there by pretending to be her husband. The gaoler now turns his interest towards Manon.

Scene 2 – The gaoler's room
The gaoler has arrested Manon but offers her rewards in the hope that she will desert des Grieux and live with him. Des Grieux, however, breaks in and kills the gaoler.

Scene 3 – The swamp
Manon and des Grieux have escaped into the swamp of Louisiana. All her former ambitions of wealth and splendour have been renounced for her love for des Grieux. While eluding their pursuers, Manon collapses and dies in his arms.

== Music in L'histoire de Manon ==
MacMillan chose not to use music from Massenet's opera Manon, instead selecting other well-known pieces by the same composer such as Elegie and Méditation. The music, originally chosen arranged and partially orchestrated by the British composer Leighton Lucas (with help from Royal Ballet pianist Hilda Gaunt) and re-orchestrated by the conductor Martin Yates in 2011, draws on thirteen operas and two oratorios as well as Massenet's orchestral suites, various mélodies and piano works.

=== Act I ===
- "Le dernier sommeil de la Vierge" from La Vierge
- "Entr'acte: Manola" from Chérubin
- Aubade: "Vive amour" from Chérubin
- "Scènes dramatiques: Scène finale" (second theme)
- "Scènes pittoresques: Marche"
- "Scènes dramatiques: Prélude et Divertissement" (second theme)
- Overture to Le Cid
- "Crépuscule" (song)
- "Entr'acte: Idylle" from Grisélidis
- "Scènes dramatiques: Prélude et Divertissement" (third theme)
- Ballet: No. 4 (Allegretto) from Thaïs
- "Lament d'Ariane" from Ariane
- "Élégie" from Les Érinnyes
- "Les moulins" from Don Quichotte
- "Marche des Princesses" from Cendrillon
- "Le sommeil de Cendrillon" from Cendrillon
- "Ouvre tes yeux bleus" (song)
- "Les filles de noblesse" from Cendrillon
- Valse très lente (piano work, later orchestrated by Massenet)
- "Scènes dramatiques: Prélude et Divertissement" (first theme)

=== Act II ===
- "Scènes alsaciennes: Au cabaret"
- "Danses: Chaldéennes" from Cléopâtre
- "Crépuscule" (song)
- "Danses: Scythes" from Cléopâtre
- "Chanson de Capri" (song)
- "Scènes pittoresques: Air de ballet"
- Nocturne from La Navarraise
- "Divertissement: Valse" from Le roi de Lahore
- "Élégie" from Les Érinnyes
- "Valse des esprits" from Grisélidis
- Prélude to Part Two of Ève
- Aria: "Il partit au printemps" from Grisélidis

=== Act III ===
- Introduction to Act One of Don Quichotte
- Chanson: "En Avignon, pays d'amour" from Grisélidis
- "Crépuscule" (song)
- "Malédiction" from Ève
- Improvisation No.3 from 7 Improvisations for Piano
- Introduction to Act One of Don Quichotte
- "Aria de Pandolfe" from Cendrillon
- Aria: "Il partit au printemps" from Grisélidis
- "Valse des esprits" from Grisélidis
- "Élégie" from Les Érinnyes
- "L'extase de la Vierge" from La Vierge

== Original cast ==
Antoinette Sibley and Anthony Dowell were selected by MacMillan to create the roles of Manon and Des Grieux. The first performance was at the Royal Opera House, Covent Garden on 7 March 1974, with the following cast:

- Antoinette Sibley – Manon
- Anthony Dowell – Des Grieux
- David Wall – Lescaut
- Monica Mason – Lescaut's mistress
- Derek Rencher – Monsieur GM
- David Drew – Gaoler

Jennifer Penney and Wayne Eagling led the second cast late in the month.
