= The Royal Ballet =

Ballet company in the United Kingdom

General information
- Name: The Royal Ballet
- Previous names: Vic-Wells Ballet; Sadler's Wells Ballet
- Year founded: 1931
- Founder: Dame Ninette de Valois
- Patron: The King
- Principal venue: Royal Opera House, London, UK
- Website: www.roh.org.uk

Senior staff
- Director: Kevin O'Hare
- President: Lady Sarah Chatto

Artistic staff
- Music director: Koen Kessels; Barry Wordsworth (Principal Guest Conductor)
- Resident choreographers: Wayne McGregor; Christopher Wheeldon

Other
- Sister company: Birmingham Royal Ballet
- Associated schools: Royal Ballet School

The Royal Ballet is a British classical ballet company, based at the Royal Opera House in Covent Garden, London, England. The largest of the five major ballet companies in Great Britain, the Royal Ballet was founded in 1931 by Dame Ninette de Valois. It became the resident ballet company of the Royal Opera House in 1946, and has purpose-built facilities within these premises. It was granted a royal charter in 1956, becoming recognised as Britain's flagship ballet company.

The Royal Ballet was one of the foremost ballet companies of the 20th century, and continues to be one of the world's most famous ballet companies to this day, generally noted for its artistic and creative values. The company employs approximately 100 dancers. The official associate school of the company is the Royal Ballet School. It also has a sister company, the Birmingham Royal Ballet, which operates independently. The prima ballerina assoluta of the Royal Ballet is the late Dame Margot Fonteyn.

== History ==
Ninette de Valois, an Irish-born dancer founded the Academy of Choreographic Art, in 1926, a dance school for girls. Her intention was to form a repertory ballet company and school, leading her to collaborate with the English theatrical producer and theatre owner Lilian Baylis. Baylis owned the Old Vic and Sadler's Wells theatres and in 1925 she engaged de Valois to stage dance performances at both venues.

Sadler's Wells reopened in 1931 and the Vic-Wells Ballet and Vic-Wells Ballet School were established in premises at the theatre. These would become the predecessors of today's Royal Ballet, Birmingham Royal Ballet and Royal Ballet School. Prior to her return to Britain, Ninette de Valois had been a member of the Ballets Russes, one of the most renowned and influential ballet companies of the 20th century. The company disbanded in 1929 following the death of its founder Serge Diaghilev. When de Valois formed the Vic-Wells Ballet, she employed some of the company's former stars, including Alicia Markova and Anton Dolin, who joined as Principal dancers, and Tamara Karsavina, who worked with the company as an advisor. The Founder Musical Director was the conductor and composer Constant Lambert who had considerable artistic as well as musical influence over the early years of the company. The long-term pianist and accompanist (from the 1930s until her death in 1974) was Hilda Gaunt.

After losing the link with the Old Vic theatre, in 1939 the company was renamed Sadler's Wells Ballet and the school became Sadler's Wells Ballet School. Both continued at Sadler's Wells Theatre until 1946, when the company was invited to become the resident ballet company of the newly re-opened Royal Opera House in Covent Garden, under the direction of David Webster. The company relocated to the opera house the same year in 1946, with their first production at the venue being The Sleeping Beauty.

Following the relocation of the company, the school moved to its own premises in 1947. A sister company was established to continue performances at Sadler's Wells, called the Sadler's Wells Theatre Ballet, under the direction of John Field. In 1955, the sister company temporarily lost its link with Sadler's Wells and returned to the Royal Opera House as a touring unit of the main company.

In 1956, a Royal Charter was granted for both companies and the school; they were subsequently renamed the Royal Ballet, Sadler's Wells Royal Ballet and the Royal Ballet School.

The Sadler's Wells Royal Ballet returned to Sadler's Wells Theatre in 1970, while continuing to tour the country. In 1987, however, the company was invited to become the resident ballet company at the Birmingham Hippodrome. It relocated to Birmingham in 1990, being renamed Birmingham Royal Ballet and it ceased to be part of the Royal Ballet in 1997 when it was made independent of the Royal Opera House, with Sir Peter Wright as artistic director. Birmingham Royal Ballet retains close relationships with both the Royal Ballet and The Royal Ballet School, which is the official school of the company.

In 1964 the Royal Ballet established "Ballet for All" under the direction of Peter Brinson. Between 1964 and 1979 "Ballet for All" toured throughout the country, presenting around 150 performances per annum and reaching around 70,000 people each year. In 1976 the Royal Opera House established its schools' matinee programme.

Today the Royal Ballet remains the resident ballet company at the Royal Opera House, conducting its own tours internationally, and it continues to be the parent company of the Royal Ballet School, which is now based at White Lodge, Richmond Park and premises in Floral Street, which are adjacent to and have direct access to the Royal Opera House.

=== Sergeyev ===
During its formative years, the Sadler's Wells Ballet would become one of the first ballet companies outside the Soviet Union to stage full productions of ballets by Marius Petipa and Lev Ivanov, which were central to the repertory of the Imperial Russian Ballet. To stage these ballets with her newly formed company, de Valois employed Nicholas Sergeyev, a former régisseur of the Imperial. He staged productions of Petipa's The Sleeping Beauty; Petipa and Ivanov's Swan Lake and The Nutcracker; Petipa and Cecchetti's production of Coppélia; and Petipa's Giselle. Created with the aid of choreographic notation written in St Petersburg at the turn of the 20th century, these works have been included in the repertoire of the Royal Ballet ever since. The company now uses Peter Wright's 1984 production of The Nutcracker, which uses some of Sergeyev's notation. Sergeyev's revivals of these ballets in London are regarded as the foundation point of the traditional classical ballet repertoire, and led to their being restaged throughout the world. Sergeyev is considered to have made one of the most significant contributions to the popularity of ballet worldwide. His choreographic notation and other materials relating to it have been preserved in the Sergeyev Collection, part of the theatre collection of the Harvard University Library.

=== Prima ballerina assoluta ===
The Royal Ballet is one of the few ballet companies in the world to have employed four dancers considered to be prima ballerina assoluta, including three who studied at the Royal Ballet School.

The first was Alicia Markova who, having been mentored by Ninette de Valois as a member of Serge Diaghilev's Ballets Russes, was invited to become one of the founder dancers of the Royal Ballet. She was designated the company's first Prima ballerina, and was later recognised as a Prima ballerina assoluta.

Margot Fonteyn trained at the Royal Ballet School and spent her entire career with the company. As a gift for her 60th birthday, she was appointed Prima ballerina assoluta by Queen Elizabeth II.

Phyllis Spira joined the Royal Ballet School in 1959, graduating into the Royal Ballet touring company. She later returned to her native South Africa, where she was appointed Prima ballerina assoluta by the President in 1984.

The most recent is Alessandra Ferri, who completed her training at the Royal Ballet Upper School and began her career with the Royal Ballet. After dancing with the company for four years, she was later appointed prima ballerina assoluta of La Scala Theatre Ballet in Milan.

Other prima ballerina assoluta have also appeared with the Royal Ballet as guest dancers, including: the French ballerina Yvette Chauviré, and the Georgian ballerina Nina Ananiashvili.

== Structure ==
The Royal Ballet has six ranks of dancers:

- Artist: the lowest rank in the company. Together with the First Artists, dancers at this level form the Corps de ballet. Ballet school graduates entering the company usually do so at this level.
- First Artist: Dancers at this level have the opportunity to perform some of the Corps de Ballet's more featured rôles, such as the Dance of the Cygnets in Swan Lake. First Artists will occasionally be cast in minor Soloist rôles if they are being considered for promotion.
- Soloist: a rank normally occupied by 15–20 dancers in the company, who perform most of the solo and minor rôles, such as Mercutio in Romeo and Juliet or one of the Fairies in The Sleeping Beauty.
- First soloist: the rank at which dancers are being considered for promotion to Principal. A dancer at this rank will dance a varied repertoire of the most featured soloist rôles, whilst understudying principals and so performing leading rôles when a Principal dancer is injured or unavailable.
- Principal character artist: the rank given to members of the company who perform important character rôles in a ballet. These rôles are normally very theatrical and often include character dance and ballet mime. Examples include Carabosse in The Sleeping Beauty or Drosselmeyer in The Nutcracker. Most Principal Character Artists in the Royal Ballet are older, long-serving members of the company who are no longer able to dance the more physically challenging roles.
- Principal: the highest rank in the Royal Ballet. Dancers at this level are the leading dancers in the company, and generally perform the most demanding and prominent rôles in a ballet. Many of the world's most celebrated dancers have been principals with the company.

The Royal Ballet also has the special ranks of "guest artist" and "principal guest artist". The title of guest artist is given to a visiting dancer who has been cast in a role for a specific ballet or limited season. The title of principal guest artist is sometimes given to guest artists who perform with the company on a longer-term basis.

== The company ==
The Royal Ballet employs approximately 100 dancers and a complete list as of 2013 is shown below. The company also has an Executive, Artistic and Music staff, including the following:

- Director – Kevin O'Hare, a graduate of the Royal Ballet School and former dancer with The Royal Ballet and Birmingham Royal Ballet
- Music Director – Koen Kessels, a Belgian conductor
- Resident Choreographer – Wayne McGregor CBE, an award-winning choreographer, most noted in the field of contemporary dance and as artistic director of Random Dance company
- Artistic Associate – Christopher Wheeldon OBE

=== Principal dancers ===
Name	Nationality	Training	Other companies (inc. guest performances)
Matthew Ball	United Kingdom	Royal Ballet School	Matthew Bourne's New Adventures
William Bracewell	United Kingdom	Royal Ballet School	Birmingham Royal Ballet
Reece Clarke	United Kingdom	Royal Ballet School	
Cesar Corrales	Cuba; Canada	Canada's National Ballet School; ABT Studio Company	English National Ballet
Lauren Cuthbertson*	United Kingdom	Royal Ballet School	Teatro Colón Teatro di San Carlo Teatro dell'Opera di Roma The Australian Ballet Mariinsky Ballet
Melissa Hamilton	United Kingdom	Jennifer Bullick School of Ballet; Elmhurst Ballet School	Dresden Semperoper Ballett
Francesca Hayward	United Kingdom	Royal Ballet School	
Ryoichi Hirano	Japan	Setsuko Hirano Ballet School	
Fumi Kaneko	Japan	Jinushi Kaoru Ballet School	Jinushi Kaoru Ballet Company
Sarah Lamb	United States	Boston Ballet School	Boston Ballet
Mayara Magri	Brazil	Petite Danse School; Royal Ballet School	
Steven McRae	Australia	Hilary Kaplan; Royal Ballet School	
Vadim Muntagirov	Russia	Perm State Choreographic College	English National Ballet
Yasmine Naghdi	United Kingdom	Royal Ballet School	
Marianela Núñez	Argentina	Colón Theatre Ballet School; Royal Ballet School	Vienna State Ballet American Ballet Theatre; La Scala Theatre Ballet Ballet Argentino de La Plata The Australian Ballet
Anna Rose O'Sullivan	United Kingdom	Royal Ballet School	
Natalia Osipova	Russia	Moscow State Academy of Choreography	Bolshoi Ballet; American Ballet Theatre; Mikhaylovsky Theatre
Calvin Richardson	Australia	Royal Ballet School	
Marcelino Sambé	Portugal	National Conservatory of Lisbon; Royal Ballet School	
Joseph Sissens	United Kingdom	Royal Ballet School	
Akane Takada	Japan	Hiromi Takahashi Ballet Studio; Bolshoi Ballet Academy	

*Principal Guest Artist

=== Principal character artists ===
- Christina Arestis
- Gary Avis (Ballet Master)
- Bennet Gartside
- Alastair Marriott
- Elizabeth McGorian
- Kristen McNally
- Christopher Saunders (Senior Ballet Master)
- Thomas Whitehead

=== First soloists ===
- Luca Acri
- Lukas B. Brændsrød
- Annette Buvoli
- Claire Calvert
- Yuhui Choe
- Leo Dixon
- Leticia Dias
- Nicol Edmonds
- Isabella Gasparini
- James Hay
- Meaghan Grace Hinkis
- Joonhyuk Jun
- Sae Maeda
- Mariko Sasaki
- Valentino Zucchetti

=== Soloists ===
- Sophie Allnatt
- Harris Bell
- Liam Boswell
- Mica Bradbury
- Olivia Cowley
- Ashley Dean
- David Donnelly
- Téo Dubreuil
- Tristan Dyer
- Benjamin Ella
- Hannah Grennell
- Daichi Ikarashi
- Joshua Junker
- Chisato Katsura
- Isabel Lubach
- Taisuke Nakao
- Viola Pantuso
- Julia Roscoe
- Giacomo Rovero
- Francisco Serrano
- Amelia Townsend
- Ella Newton Severgnini

=== First artists ===
- Denilson Almeida
- Madison Bailey
- Harry Churches
- Kevin Emerton
- Olivia Findlay
- Brayden Gallucci
- Bomin Kim
- Harrison Lee
- Caspar Lench
- Marco Masciari
- Erico Montes
- Nadia Mullova-Barley
- Aiden O’Brien
- Hanna Park
- Maddison Pritchard
- Sumina Sasaki
- Leticia Stock
- Charlotte Tonkinson
- Marianna Tsembenhoi
- Lara Turk
- Yu Hang
- Ginevra Zambon

=== Artists ===
- Bethany Bartlett
- Ravi Connier-Watson
- Martin Diaz
- Luc Foskett
- Sierra Glasheen
- Emile Gooding
- Scarlett Harvey
- James Large
- Francesca Lloyd
- Alejandro Muñoz
- Rebecca Myles Stewart
- Katie Robertson
- Isabella Shaker
- Blake Smith

=== Aud Jebsen Young Dancers Programme ===
- Amos Child
- Aurora Chinchilla
- LilySophia Dashwood
- Tristan-Ian Massa
- Shani Moran-Simmonds
- Joe Parkinson
- Yuki Nagayasu

== Repertoire ==
- Swan Lake
- Giselle
- La fille mal gardée
- Onegin
- Sylvia
- The Sleeping Beauty
- Cinderella
- Manon
- Romeo and Juliet – (Romeo and Juliet (MacMillan))
- Mayerling
- The Prince of the Pagodas
- A Month in the Country
- Winter Dreams
- The Tales of Beatrix Potter
- Peter and the Wolf
- The Nutcracker
- Les Patineurs
- La Valse
- Theme and Variations
- Invitus Invitam
- Rhapsody
- Sensorium
- The Rite of Spring
- Ballo della Regina
- DGV: Danse à Grande Vitesse
- Scènes de ballet (Ashton)
- Voluntaries
- Still Life at the Penguin Cafe
- Alice's Adventures in Wonderland
- La Bayadère
- The Firebird
- Agon
- Symphony in C
- Ondine
- Concerto
- Elite Syncopations
- The Judas Tree
- Carmen
- Limen
- Chroma
- Asphodel Meadows
- Sphinx
- As One
- Electric Counterpoint
- Tryst
- Song of the Earth
- Anastasia
- The Dream
- Sweet Violets
- Carbon Life
- The Winter's Tale
- Frankenstein
- Like Water for Chocolate

== Sir Frederick Ashton ==
Sir Frederick Ashton (1904–1988) was the founder choreographer of the Royal Ballet. Previously a dancer with the Ballet Rambert, Ashton started his career as a choreographer under the direction of Dame Marie Rambert, before joining the Royal Ballet as its associate choreographer when the company was founded in 1931. He created the majority of the company's early works and staged their first performance at the Royal Opera House, a production of The Sleeping Beauty in 1946. Ashton was appointed artistic director of the Royal Ballet from 1963 to 1970, when he retired from the post. He continued to work as a choreographer internationally, with his final work being the Nursery Suite, for a gala performance by the Royal Ballet School at the Royal Opera House in 1986. His numerous ballets have since been staged by leading dance companies worldwide and feature strongly in the programming of the Royal Ballet today.

=== Works choreographed ===
Ashton created over 100 original ballet works and numerous other productions, some of the most notable including:

- A Month in the Country
- Birthday Offering
- Cinderella
- Dante Sonata
- Daphnis and Chloë
- Façade
- La fille mal gardée
- Les Patineurs
- Les Rendezvous
- Marguerite and Armand
- Nocturne
- Ondine
- Regatta
- Rhapsody
- Romeo and Juliet
- Symphonic Variations
- The Dream
- Varii capricci

== Sir Kenneth MacMillan ==
Sir Kenneth MacMillan (11 December 1929 – 29 October 1992) was a British ballet dancer and choreographer. He was artistic director of the Royal Ballet in London between 1970 and 1977. Although a talented dancer, MacMillan is best known for his choreography, and particularly for his work with the Royal Ballet. He also worked with the American Ballet Theatre (1956–7) and the Deutsche Oper, Berlin (1966–69). He succeeded Frederick Ashton as Director of the Royal Ballet in 1970 and resigned after seven years, frustrated at balancing the conflicting demands of creating ballets with administration. He continued as Principal Choreographer to the Royal Ballet until his death in 1992.

=== Works choreographed ===
His full-length works include:

- Romeo and Juliet [1965] — made on Lynn Seymour and Christopher Gable, but the premiere was danced by Margot Fonteyn and Rudolf Nureyev
- Anastasia — made on Lynn Seymour
- Manon — made on Antoinette Sibley, Anthony Dowell and Jennifer Penney
- Mayerling
- Isadora
- The Prince of the Pagodas [1989] — made on Darcey Bussell and Jonathan Cope.

MacMillan's one-act ballets include:

- Danses Concertantes — commissioned by Dame Ninette de Valois in 1955
- Different Drummer
- The Invitation — made on Lynn Seymour and Christopher Gable, 1960
- The Rite of Spring — made on Monica Mason
- Elite Syncopations
- My Brother, My Sisters
- La Fin du Jour
- Valley of Shadows — made on Alessandra Ferri
- Gloria
- Noctambules
- Song of the Earth
- Solitaire
- Requiem
- Winter Dreams — based on Anton Chekhov's "Three Sisters"
- The Judas Tree 1992 — his last ballet, made on Viviana Durante and Irek Mukhamedov.

== Wayne McGregor ==
Prior to his appointment as Resident Choreographer of the Royal Ballet, Wayne McGregor (born 1970) has already established himself as an award-winning dancer, choreographer and director. His first choreography for the Royal Ballet, was Fleur de Peux, a solo work created in 2000 on Viviana Durante. This led to further commissions by the Royal Ballet, including Symbiont(s) in 2001, Qualia in 2003 and Engram in 2005. He also created the ballet brainstate in 2001, as a collaboration between the Royal Ballet and his own company, Random Dance. McGregor was appointed Resident Choreographer of the Royal Ballet in 2006, the first person to hold the post in sixteen years, and the first to be selected from the world of contemporary dance.

=== Works choreographed ===
McGregor's works for the Royal Ballet include:

- Fleur de Peux
- Symbiont(s)
- Qualia
- Engram
- Chroma
- Limen
- Nimbus
- Infra
- Live Fire Exercise
- Carbon Life
- Woolf Works
- The Dante Project

== Fonteyn–Nureyev ==
First performing together with the Royal Ballet in Giselle on 21 February 1962, Margot Fonteyn (1919–1991) and Rudolf Nureyev (1938–1993) would form what has been called the greatest ballet partnership of all time. The partnership led to both dancers being noted amongst the most famous ballet dancers of all time and came at the peak of what is now widely regarded as the most successful period in the Royal Ballet's history.

On 12 March 1963, the couple premiered Sir Frederick Ashton's Marguerite and Armand, the first ballet created for them and one that become their signature piece. Performed to a piece of piano music by Franz Liszt, the ballet starts with Marguerite on her deathbed, and the story is told in flashback until the moment Armand arrives to hold her for the last time before she dies. Ashton had planned the piece specifically for Fonteyn, and it was critically acclaimed as Fonteyn's dramatic peak, with fifty photographers attending the dress rehearsal and twenty-one curtain calls at the premiere performance. The final performance of the ballet starring Fonteyn and Nureyev was staged at a gala at the London Coliseum in 1977 and it was not performed again until 2003. Against the wishes of Frederick Ashton that it not be performed by any other dancers than Fonteyn and Nureyev, it was revived as part of a Royal Ballet triple-bill, starring Nureyev's protegee Sylvie Guillem and the Royal Ballet star Jonathan Cope.

The Fonteyn-Nureyev partnership lasted for many years until Fonteyn's retirement from the Royal Ballet in 1979, aged 60. In 1970 after Frederick Ashton retired as artistic director of the Royal Ballet, there were many calls for Nureyev to be announced as his successor. However, Kenneth MacMillan was given the position, and Nureyev left the Royal Ballet as a Principal soon after to be a guest dancer internationally, later becoming artistic director of the Paris Opera Ballet in 1983. Fonteyn and Nureyev had a lifelong relationship both on and offstage and were close friends until Fonteyn's death in 1991. Nureyev is quoted as saying of the partnership that they danced with "one body, one soul".

== Notable people ==
=== Dancers ===
- Carlos Acosta, CBE
- Leanne Benjamin, OBE
- Svetlana Beriosova
- David Blair
- Federico Bonelli
- Dame Darcey Bussell, DBE
- Alexander Campbell
- José Manuel Carreño
- Alina Cojocaru
- Lesley Collier, CBE
- Michael Coleman
- Jonathan Cope, CBE
- John Cranko
- Lauren Cuthbertson
- Henry Danton
- Sir Anton Dolin
- Sir Anthony Dowell, CBE
- Viviana Durante
- Alessandra Ferri
- John Field
- Dame Margot Fonteyn, DBE
- Christopher Gable
- Mara Galeazzi
- John Gilpin
- Alexander Grant
- Dame Beryl Grey, DBE
- Sylvie Guillem, CBE
- Francesca Hayward
- Sir Robert Helpmann, CBE
- Rowena Jackson, MBE
- Colin Jones
- Johan Kobborg
- Tetsuya Kumakawa
- Sarah Lamb
- Gillian Lynne, CBE
- Natalia Makarova
- David Makhateli
- Dame Alicia Markova, DBE
- Roberta Marquez
- Dame Monica Mason, DBE
- Steven McRae
- Laura Morera
- Irek Mukhamedov
- Vadim Muntagirov
- Nadia Nerina
- Marianela Núñez, OBE
- Rudolf Nureyev
- Natalia Osipova
- Dame Merle Park, DBE
- Georgina Parkinson
- Rupert Pennefather
- Sergei Polunin
- Ivan Putrov
- Samantha Raine
- Tamara Rojo
- Lynn Seymour
- Dame Antoinette Sibley, DBE
- Brian Shaw
- Moira Shearer, Lady Kennedy
- Wayne Sleep, OBE
- Thiago Soares
- Zoltan Solymosi
- Michael Somes, CBE
- Pirmin Treku
- David Wall, CBE
- Edward Watson, MBE
- Miyako Yoshida
- Zenaida Yanowsky
- Alexandra Ansanelli

=== Guest dancers ===
- Roberto Bolle
- Ethan Stiefel
- Igor Zelensky
- Yvette Chauvire
- Nina Ananiashvili

=== Choreographers ===
- Sir Frederick Ashton, founder choreographer
- David Bintley, CBE
- John Cranko
- Sir Robert Helpmann
- Sir Kenneth MacMillan
- Wayne McGregor
- Christopher Wheeldon
- Liam Scarlett

=== Artistic directors ===
- 1931–1963, Dame Ninette de Valois
- 1963–1970, Sir Frederick Ashton
- 1970–1977, Sir Kenneth MacMillan
- 1970–1971, John Field (co-director)
- 1977–1986, Norman Morrice
- 1986–2001, Sir Anthony Dowell
- 2001–2002, Ross Stretton
- 2002–2012, Dame Monica Mason
- 2012–present, Kevin O'Hare

== Ross Stretton ==
Born in Canberra, Australia, in 1952, Ross Stretton trained at the Australian Ballet School, later becoming a principal dancer with the Australian Ballet company. He then moved to America, where he danced with the Joffrey Ballet and as a principal dancer with American Ballet Theatre before retiring as a dancer in 1990. He was appointed regisseur of American Ballet Theatre, becoming assistant director of the company in 1993. After returning to Australia, he was artistic director of the Australian Ballet from 1997 to 2001.

Following Sir Anthony Dowell's retirement as artistic director of the Royal Ballet in 2001, the board of the Royal Opera House announced Stretton as his successor, with a three-year contract; however, he resigned the post after 13 months, in September 2002. Stretton's appointment and subsequent departure from the Royal Ballet generated an unprecedented level of media attention for the Royal Ballet in recent years, due to controversy caused by his management of the company. Following his resignation, Stretton returned to Australia where he worked as a teacher and consultant until his death from cancer in 2005.

A number of controversial issues and allegations as well as resistance to organisational change lead to Stretton's departure from the Royal Ballet:

- Principal dancer Sarah Wildor quit the company after a dispute over casting. Stretton had both historically and during his tenure with The Royal Ballet favoured athletic, speedy dancers as opposed to those with a more lyrical style, such as Wildor.
- Lady MacMillan threatened to withdraw performing rights to works by her late husband Sir Kenneth MacMillan.
- Stretton's programming was badly received by critics.
- Dancers let it be known they were considering strike action; however, talks between Equity, the dancers' union, and the Royal Opera House's executive director Tony Hall, averted industrial action.
- Rumours and allegations were made that Stretton engaged in sexual liaisons and affairs with various dancers. Royal Opera House spokesman Christopher Millard said "there have been no informal or formal complaints to management of Royal Opera House about this."

== Kevin O'Hare ==
Former Birmingham Royal Ballet Principal dancer and Royal Ballet Administrative Director Kevin O'Hare succeeded Monica Mason as Director of The Royal Ballet in August 2012. Administrative Director of the company since 2009, O'Hare retired from dancing in 2000 and subsequently worked with the Royal Shakespeare Company and as Company Manager of Birmingham Royal Ballet.

This is a great honour for me. Under Monica Mason's inspired leadership The Royal Ballet has had a great ten years. I am equally ambitious for the Company and dance in general. I plan to bring together the most talented artists of the 21st century to collaborate on the same stage – world class dancers, choreographers, designers, and musicians. I will aim to use all the traditional and new platforms now available to engage our audiences in our classic repertoire, and The Royal Ballet's unique heritage. I want to continue to invigorate audiences with new work and emerging talents and I am thrilled that Wayne McGregor and Christopher Wheeldon – two of the world’s leading choreographers – have agreed to join me and Jeanetta Laurence, Associate Director to become part of the senior artistic team. Both Wayne and Christopher share my exciting ambitions for the Company."

== Proposed Royal Opera House, Manchester ==
In 2008 the Royal Opera House and Manchester City Council began the planning stages of a new development known as Royal Opera House, Manchester. The proposal would have seen the Palace Theatre in Manchester receiving an £80 million refurbishment, to allow it to receive productions by both the Royal Ballet and Royal Opera. The proposals would have established the Palace Theatre as a designated base for the Royal Opera House companies in the North of England.

The proposals were approved by the then Secretary of State for Culture, Olympics, Media and Sport, Andy Burnham MP, and was accepted by a number of public bodies. An independent report suggested that the cost of the project would be £100 million with another £16 million needed annually for running costs of the new site. In 2010 it was announced that the project was being shelved as part of larger arts-funding cuts.

== Laurence Olivier Awards ==
The Royal Ballet company is a multiple Laurence Olivier Award winning company. The following is a complete list of awards won by the company and its staff since the awards were established in 1978. These include awards presented to the company for a production of a particular ballet, to individual dancers for their performance in a specific rôle, to designers for their work on a specific production and to other members of the Royal Ballet staff for achievements in dance.

- 1978 – Production of the Year in Ballet, for a production of Sir Frederick Ashton's A Month in the Country
- 1980 – Outstanding Achievement of the Year in Ballet, for a production of Gloria
- 1981 – Outstanding First Achievement of the Year in Ballet, awarded to Bryony Brind for her performance in The Royal Ballet's Dances of Albion
- 1983 – Outstanding Individual Performance of the Year in a New Dance Production, awarded to Alessandra Ferri for her performance in the Royal Ballet's Valley of Shadows
- 1983 – Outstanding New Dance Production of the Year, for a production of Sir Kenneth MacMillan's Requiem
- 1992 – Outstanding Achievement of the Year in Dance, for a production of William Forsythe's In The Middle, Somewhat Elevated
- 1992 – Society of London Theatre Special Award, awarded to the Royal Ballet's founder and director Dame Ninette de Valois in recognition of her achievements in dance
- 1993 – Best New Dance Production, for a production of Sir Kenneth MacMillan's The Judas Tree
- 1995 – Best New Dance Production, for their production of Fearful Symmetries
- 1995 – Outstanding Achievement in Dance, awarded to lighting designer Peter Mumford for the Royal Ballet's Fearful Symmetries
- 2007 – Best New Dance Production, for their new production Chroma, choreographed by Wayne McGregor
- 2008 – Best New Dance Production, for the company premiere of George Balanchine's ballet Jewels
- 2008 – Outstanding Achievement in Dance, for the company premiere of George Balanchine's ballet Jewels
- 2010 – Best New Dance Production, awarded to the Brandstrup-Rojo Project, Goldberg (a collaboration between choreographer Kim Brandstrup and dancer Tamara Rojo)
- 2013 - Outstanding Achievement in Dance, awarded to principal dancer Marianela Núñez
- 2016 - Best New Dance Production, for their new production Woolf Works, choreographed by Wayne McGregor
- 2016 - Outstanding Achievement in Dance, for her performances in Chéri and Woolf Works, guest dancer Alessandra Ferri
- 2018 – Best New Dance Production, for their new production Flight Pattern, choreographed by Crystal Pite

== See also ==
- English National Ballet School, the associate school of English National Ballet
- List of productions of Swan Lake derived from its 1895 revival
- Northern Ballet, a Leeds-based ballet company
- Rambert Dance Company, a ballet company contemporaneous to the Royal Ballet during the latter's formative years (now a modern dance company)
- Royal Ballet of Flanders, the royal ballet company of Belgium
- Royal Danish Ballet, the royal ballet company of Denmark
- Royal Swedish Ballet, the royal ballet company of Sweden
- Scottish Ballet, the national ballet company of Scotland
