= Michael Somes =

English ballet dancer

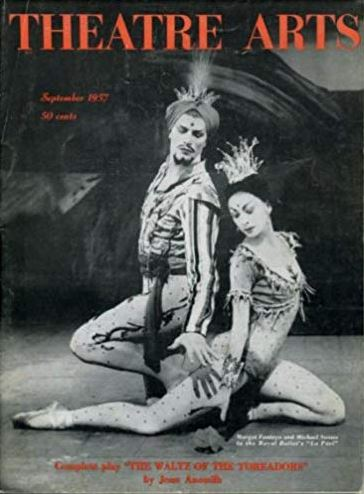
Michael Somes and Margot Fonteyn, Theatre Arts Magazine September 1957

Michael George Somes CBE (28 September 1917 – 18 November 1994), was an English ballet dancer. He was a principal dancer of The Royal Ballet, London, and the frequent partner of Margot Fonteyn.

== Early years ==
Somes was born in Horsley, Gloucestershire, England, the son of Edwin Joseph Somes (1882–1973), a professional musician, and Ethel M. M. Pridham (1889–1972), a schoolmistress. He had an elder brother, Laurence Joseph Somes (1913–1987).

== Career ==
In 1934, he was awarded the first scholarship given to a male by the Royal Ballet (then known as the Vic-Wells Ballet). In 1938, he and Fonteyn created the principal rôles in the Frederick Ashton – Constant Lambert ballet Horoscope, after which he was described as "potentially the finest British male dancer of the half century". He originated rôles in 24 ballets choreographed for the company by Ashton, and was the lead male dancer for the company from 1951 until the arrival of Rudolf Nureyev in 1962. From then on, Somes appeared in character rôles, most notably as Lord Capulet in Romeo and Juliet. Somes was assistant director of the company under Ashton from 1963 to 1970.

Somes appeared on The Ed Sullivan Show in 1954, and in television versions of Swan Lake (1954), The Sleeping Beauty (1955) and The Nutcracker (1958), as well as a film version of Prokofiev's Romeo and Juliet (1966). All three productions starred Margot Fonteyn.

In 1959, Somes was named a Commander of the Order of the British Empire (CBE).

== Personal life ==
In 1954, Somes married the ballet dancer Deirdre Annette Dixon (1934–1959), a junior soloist for the Royal Ballet. Dixon died in a London hospital on May 28, 1959, aged 25, from a cerebral abscess and meningitis, although her obituary in The Stage states that her death was from the effects of a car accident two years previously. Somes then married fellow ballet dancer Antoinette Sibley in 1964; they divorced in 1973. He later married ballet dancer Wendy Ellis. He died of a brain tumour in London in 1994.

Somes was a distant relative (1st cousin 3 times removed) of Joseph Somes, (1787–1845), British shipowner, Conservative politician and Governor of the New Zealand Company. He was also related to the latter's namesake Joseph Somes (1819–1871), Conservative M.P. for Kingston upon Hull from 1859 to 1865.
