= David Wall (dancer) =

English ballet dancer (1946–2013)

David Wall CBE
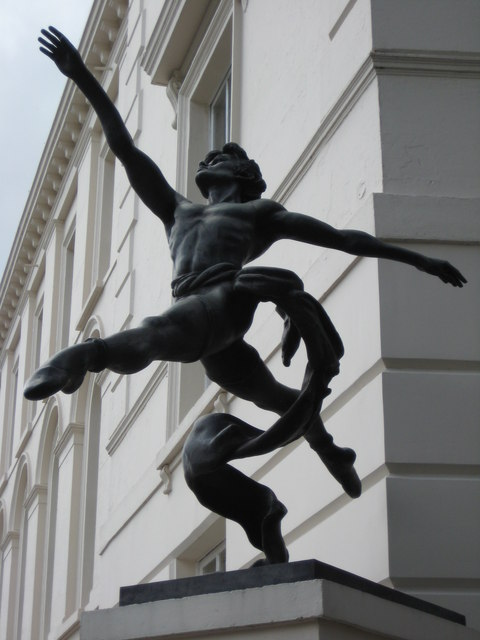
- Jeté, a sculpture by Enzo Plazzotta based on David Wall
- Born: 15 March 1946; Chiswick, London, England
- Died: 18 June 2013 (aged 67); Croydon, London, England
- Occupation: Ballet dancer

David Richard Wall CBE (15 March 1946 – 18 June 2013) was an English ballet dancer of The Royal Ballet, where he was promoted to the rank of principal at the age of 21, the youngest in company history at the time.

== Early life and education ==
Wall was born in Chiswick, London and went to preparatory school at Halliford School in Shepperton, where ballroom dancing classes were compulsory. His mother always said that he developed an interest in ballet watching the girls in the ballet classes that followed those ballroom classes. He then started weekly ballet classes with Mrs. Durnsford in Windsor. Wall studied at the Royal Ballet School and subsequently joined The Royal Ballet.

== Career ==
Wall was 20 when he was promoted to soloist. A year later, he became the youngest male principal in the history of The Royal Ballet, until Sergei Polunin’s promotion in 2010 at the age of 20. He remained with the company until 1984. Among his roles were Crown Prince Rudolf in Kenneth MacMillan's Mayerling, the Young Man in Frederick Ashton's The Two Pigeons, the Rake in a revival of Ninette de Valois's Hogarth-based work The Rake's Progress, Colas in Ashton's La fille mal gardée, and Siegfried in Swan Lake, in which he was the youngest Siegfried ever seen at Covent Garden.

Wall was a frequent partner to Dame Margot Fonteyn. In 1977, he won the Evening Standard Award for Outstanding Achievement in Dance. Wall retired from The Royal Ballet in 1984 and was appointed a Commander of the Order of the British Empire (CBE) in the 1985 New Year Honours.

In 1985 Wall joined the Royal Academy of Dancing where he was director and general secretary until 1991. Following this he became guest repetiteur with London City Ballet, and joined English National Ballet as ballet master in 1995.

A statue based on David Wall, Jeté, by Enzo Plazzotta, was installed in 1975 on the corner of 46-57 Millbank, Westminster, London.

== Personal life ==
Wall married Alfreda Thorogood, a fellow dancer, in 1967. They first met when Wall was aged ten and both were students at the Royal Ballet School. They had two children together, Daniel and Annelise.

He died of cancer at his family home in Croydon, London, on 18 June 2013.
