= Romeo and Juliet (MacMillan) =

1965 ballet by Kenneth MacMillan

- Choreographer: Kenneth MacMillan
- Music: Sergei Prokofiev
- Premiere: 1965; Royal Opera House, London
- Original ballet company: The Royal Ballet
- Genre: Ballet
- Type: Classical

Choreographer Sir Kenneth MacMillan's Royal Ballet production of Sergei Prokofiev's Romeo and Juliet premiered at the Royal Opera House, Covent Garden on 9 February 1965.

== Background ==
Kenneth MacMillan had previously choreographed the balcony scene for Lynn Seymour and Christopher Gable to dance in September 1964 for Canadian Television. This scene provided an essential part of the ballet's overall structure. Seymour stated that the balcony scene pas de deux only took three rehearsals to fully choreograph. This experience made him seem a good candidate to choreograph the entire ballet for Covent Garden, when the Soviet Union refused to allow Leonid Lavrovsky's classic production to tour to London. MacMillan prepared his version with the blessing of Frederick Ashton. MacMillan only had five months to choreograph the full ballet as The Royal Ballet hoped to perform Romeo and Juliet in its upcoming American tour. He, Seymour, and Gable planned the ballet around the characters and their pas de deuxs. They envisioned Juliet as the headstrong character, making decisions, while Romeo was "swept off his feet by love". Nicholas Georgiadis designed the set and costumes with specific intent regarding the characters and feel of the performance. The imposing, large set designs were utilized to emphasize how small and vulnerable Juliet was in comparison and position her and Romeo as helpless against the society they live in. MacMillan and Georgiadias were inspired by Italian Quattrocento paintings and architecture; Shakespeare, and Franco Zeffirelli's 1960 Romeo and Juliet production. MacMillan also took inspiration from Cranko's Romeo and Juliet to include the rowdy harlots in the market scenes.

== Premiere performance ==
Kenneth MacMillan's Royal Ballet production of Sergei Prokofiev's Romeo and Juliet premiered at the Royal Opera House, Covent Garden on 9 February 1965. Though MacMillan had conceived the ballet for Lynn Seymour and Christopher Gable, for "bureaucratic reasons" Margot Fonteyn and Rudolph Nureyev danced the opening night, to MacMillan's disappointment. The casting change was disheartening not only to MacMillan, but to the entire company, contributing to MacMillan and Seymour's eventual move away from the Royal Ballet and Gable's transition away from dancing entirely. Mainly, Fonteyn and Nureyev were given the leading roles because of their fame and box office draw. The impresario for the American tour, Sol Hurok said that the ballet would only be included and profitable in the US if Fonteyn and Nureyev were given the title roles. Fonteyn and Nureyev brought new life to the characters, as did the set and costume designs by Nicholas Georgiadis; Fonteyn, considered to be near retirement, embarked upon a rejuvenated career with a partnership with Nureyev. Lynn Seymour left the Royal Ballet for three years after this slight to dance with the German Opera Ballet in West Berlin, but she returned in 1970 to dance many principal roles.

== Response ==
The first production of Romeo and Juliet was met with overwhelmingly positive critical and box office response. Fonteyn and Nureyev received 43 curtain calls, eventually needing the safety curtain to descend in order to encourage the audience to leave the theater. Critics agreed across the board that the ballet was a fantastic addition to the Royal Ballet's repertoire as well as an accomplishment for MacMillan. The Observer, The Daily Mail, and the Sunday Telegraph were a few of the magazines and papers to review the performance. Andrew Porter with The Financial Times, who was the first critic to discuss the last minute casting change, noted that the ballet could not be fully understood until Seymour performed the role designed for her.

== Following performances ==
Lynn Seymour and Christopher Gable danced the lead roles in the second cast, also receiving rave reviews, though not the same level of overt audience appreciation. They were followed by three other pairings in the first tour and many more throughout the decades since.

The first five performances of Romeo and Juliet have remained highly lauded by critics. Alastair Macaulay spoke of Fonteyn and Nureyev's performance as "If there was a single moment in my life that turned me into a ballet obsessive, that was it". In the New York Times in 2007. He also lauded Seymour's rebellious Juliet.

Romeo and Juliet has become a staple of the Royal Ballet's Repertoire. MacMillan went on to restage the ballet for other companies around the world such as The Royal Swedish Ballet, American Ballet Theatre, and the Birmingham Royal Ballet. The Birmingham Royal Ballet also included a new set and costume design by Paul Andrews.

== Film ==
The production was filmed by Paul Czinner and received a cinematic release in 1966. The star-studded first cast with Fonteyn and Nureyev performed.

The film was one of a series of movies financed between Rank and the NFFC. It received some strong reviews but was a box office disappointment. Since then it has been live streamed and recorded multiple times, the most recent of which being the 2012 filmed production of the ballet starring Lauren Cuthbertson and Federico Bonelli, filmed by Ross MacGibbon. A 90-minute abridgment by writer-producers (and dancers) Michael Nunn and William Trevitt for BBC television was broadcast in 2020 on PBS Great Performances.

== Original cast ==
- Margot Fonteyn, Juliet
- Rudolph Nureyev, Romeo
- David Blair, Mercutio
- Desmond Doyle, Tybalt
- Anthony Dowell, Benvolio
- Derek Rencher, Paris
- Michael Somes, Lord Capulet
- Julia Farron, Lady Capulet
- Leslie Edwards, Escalus, Prince of Verona
- Georgina Parkinson, Rosaline
- Ronald Hynd, Friar Laurence
- Franklin Whyte, Lord Montague
- Betty Kavanagh, Lady Montague

== Sources ==
- Gottlieb, Robert. Reading Dance: A Gathering of Memoirs, Reportage, Criticism, Profiles, Interviews, and Some Uncategorizable Extras. Pantheon, 2008.
- Parry, Jann. Different Drummer: The Life of Kenneth MacMillan. London: Faber & Faber, 2009. ISBN 978-0-571-24302-0
- Petrie, Duncan James (2016). "Resisting Hollywood Dominance in Sixties British Cinema : The NFFC/Rank Joint Financing Initiative" (PDF). Historical Journal of Film, Radio and Television.
- Kavanagh, Julie. Nureyev: The Life. VINTAGE, 2008
- MacGibbon, Ross, dir. Romeo and Juliet. 1965; London, UK: Royal Opera House, 2012. DVD
- "Romeo and Juliet Pas De Deux." Kenneth MacMillan. MacMillan Estate. Accessed 7 June 2020.
- "Romeo and Juliet." Kenneth MacMillan. MacMillan Estate. Accessed 7 June 2020.
- Macaulay, Alastair. "Confessions of a 'Romeo' Fiend". The New York Times, The New York Times, 1 Apr. 2007
- The Editors of Encyclopædia Britannica. "Lynn Seymour". Encyclopædia Britannica. Encyclopædia Britannica, inc., 4 March 2019
