= The Dream (ballet) =

One-act ballet adapted from Shakespeare's A Midsummer Night's Dream

- Choreographer: Frederick Ashton
- Music: Felix Mendelssohn
- Based on: A Midsummer Night's Dream
- Premiere: 2 April 1964; Royal Opera House, London
- Original ballet company: The Royal Ballet
- Design: Henry Bardon and David Walker
- Setting: Ancient Greece
- Type: classical ballet

The Dream is a one-act ballet adapted from Shakespeare's A Midsummer Night's Dream, with choreography by Frederick Ashton to music by Mendelssohn arranged by John Lanchbery. It was premiered by The Royal Ballet at the Royal Opera House, Covent Garden on 2 April 1964 in a triple bill with Kenneth MacMillan's Images of Love and Robert Helpmann's Hamlet.

== Background ==
The ballet was presented to mark the 400th anniversary of Shakespeare's birth. Ashton drastically trimmed Shakespeare's plot, discarding Theseus and Hippolyta and the play-within-a-play, Pyramus and Thisbe. The focus of the ballet is on the fairies and the four lovers from Athens lost in the wood. Lanchbery adapted the overture and incidental music Mendelssohn had written for the play in 1826 and 1842. Ashton and his designers, Henry Bardon and David Walker, set the action in or about the 1840s.

== Plot ==
In the forest outside Athens, Oberon, king of the fairies, fights furiously with his wife Titania, as they both want the same young Indian in their entourage. Oberon decides to punish Titania for her insolence and sends his servant, the mischievous fairy Puck, to look for a pansy: the dew of the flower, poured into the eyes of sleeping Titania, will make her fall in love with the first person she will see when she awakens.

Meanwhile, Oberon and Puck meddle in the lives of four mortal lovers who wander into their path.

Much confusion ensues, between the four mortals as their loves intertwine, and within a troupe of actors, one of whom is turned into a donkey to become Titania's lover.

In the end, Oberon and Titania make peace, and Puck brings things back to their natural order.

== Cast ==
- Titania – Antoinette Sibley
- Oberon – Anthony Dowell
- Changeling Indian Boy – Alan Bauch
- Puck – Keith Martin
- Bottom – Alexander Grant
- Rustic – Lambert Cox
- Rustic – David Jones
- Rustic – Keith Milland
- Rustic – Ronald Plaisted
- Rustic – Douglas Steuart
- Helena – Carole Needham
- Hermia – Vergie Derman
- Demetrius – David Drew
- Lysander – Derek Rencher
- Peaseblossom – Ann Howard
- Cobweb – Mavis Osborn
- Moth – Ann Jenner
- Mustardseed – Jacqueline Haslam

Source: Royal Opera House performance database.

== Critical reception ==
From the outset the piece received glowing reviews. Both The Times and The Observer noted that the men's roles were particularly strong. In the latter, Alexander Bland called the piece "the first Ashton ballet to be slanted heavily in favour of the men". When the ballet was staged in New York in 2002, the critic Mary Cargill wrote of the Victorian setting:

For once, this time-shifting cliché works, because Ashton used the period's fantasies to create his magical ballet, not the period's realities. He did not choreograph Oberon as a top-hatted industrialist and Titania as his bouncy, bourgeois wife, as so many dreary, unimaginative productions of the play would have it, but modeled them on early Victorian fantasies. Ashton's choreography for the corps is an elegant and witty commentary on the period, with quick and silvery movements, and a soft, flowing upper body, with delicate echoes of the Romantic style (at one point Titania's four attendants strike the famous pose from the Pas de Quatre of the old lithographs, a beautifully designed picture in itself, and an extra joy for those who know their ballet history). Ashton distilled the action of the play to focus on the quarrels between Titania and Oberon, and between the lovers, ending in a magical reconciliation. His basic structure is flawless; the story takes place in a unified set, with the action flowing so smoothly that the dramatic skill involved is hidden.

In The New York Times, Clive Barnes called The Dream "one of the most enchanting ballets ever created," and Alastair Macaulay described it as "iridescent, classical, funny, enchanting." Writing in The Guardian, Clarissa Sebag-Montefiore called it a "masterpiece... a real treat... a work with humour, charm, and more than a sprinkling of pure magic."

== Revivals ==
Ashton's ballet was given by the Royal Ballet's touring company in the 1960s and 70s, with scenery and costumes designed by Peter Farmer. A new production, with Ashton's choreography reproduced under the direction of Anthony Dowell, was given at Covent Garden on 6 June 1986.

Among other productions, Ashton's ballet has been given by the Australian Ballet (1969); the production taught from the Benesh notation score written by Faith Worth. In 1973 The Dream entered the rep of The Joffrey Ballet and set by John Hart and Faith Worth. The following three productions—-the Royal Swedish Ballet (1975), the Dutch National Ballet (1977), the National Ballet of Canada (1977)—-were staged by Faith Worth from her Benesh notation score. American Ballet Theatre (2002). A performance by American Ballet Theatre at the Orange County Performing Arts Center in Costa Mesa, California, was videotaped in July 2003 and is available on a Kultur DVD. It stars Ethan Stiefel as Oberon, Alessandra Ferri as Titania, and Herman Cornejo in a defining performance as Puck.
