= Ray Barra =

American ballet dancer (1930–2025)

- Barra, c. 1970
- Born: Raymond Martin Barallobre Ramirez; January 3, 1930; San Francisco, California, U.S.
- Died: March 26, 2025 (aged 95); Marbella, Spain
- Occupations: Ballet dancer; Ballet master; Choreographer; Ballet director
- Organizations: American Ballet Theatre; Stuttgart Ballet; Berlin State Ballet; Hamburg Ballet; Bavarian State Ballet; Spanish National Dance Company

Raymond Martin Barallobre Ramirez (January 3, 1930 – March 26, 2025), known professionally as Ray Barra, was an American ballet dancer, ballet master, choreographer and ballet director who worked mostly in Europe. He was a soloist with the American Ballet Theatre and from 1959 a principal dancer of the Stuttgart Ballet, where he danced parts in creations by John Cranko including Romeo in Romeo and Juliet with Marcia Haydée as Julia, and the title role in Onegin. He created major roles in ballets by Kenneth MacMillan, Las Hermanas and Song of the Earth. After retiring from the stage due to an injury, he worked as a ballet master first with the Berlin State Ballet, then with John Neumeier at the ballet of the Oper Frankfurt and the Hamburg Ballet. He was associate director of the Spanish National Dance Company, and created several choreographies internationally.

== Early life and career ==
Born Raymond Martin Barallobre Ramirez in San Francisco on January 3, 1930, he grew up in a Spanish family. The boy was attracted to dance when he watched films of Fred Astaire, Gene Kelly, Eleanor Powell and Ginger Rogers at age eleven. He studied ballet at the School of Ballet in San Francisco with the Christensen brothers, influential in early American ballet. He studied further at the American Ballet Theatre School in New York City. In 1949 he became a member of the San Francisco Opera Ballet. He had to serve in the military for two years during the Korea War, stationed in Japan. From 1953 to 1959 he danced with American Ballet Theatre (ABT), already as a soloist. He starred in Paean, by Herbert Ross to music by Ernest Chausson in May 1957, alongside Nora Kaye, John Kriza and Lupe Serrano. During this time, he also danced on Broadway and in can-can to make money. When the ABT troupe toured in France in 1959 and a fire caused the production to be closed for a year, Barra remained in Europe.

He was a principal dancer of the Stuttgart Ballet, then directed by Nicholas Beriosov, from 1959. When John Cranko came to Stuttgart in 1961, Barra was one of few dancers remaining in the company. He created roles in his productions, such as the title role in Romeo and Juliet with Marcia Haydée as Julia (1962) and the title role in Onegin (1965), both regarded as among the most important male characters in 20th-century ballet. He also appeared as the Prince in Swan Lake. and the Prince in Firebird (1964) He created major roles in ballets by Kenneth MacMillan, Pepe in Las Hermanas based on Lorca's play The House of Bernarda Alba, again alongside Haydee (1963), and Song of the Earth (1965).

In 1966, Barra had to retire from the stage due to an injury during rehearsal on his 36th birthday. He worked as ballet master, first from 1966 with the ballet of the Deutsche Oper Berlin following MacMillan. From 1970 he worked with John Neumeier, first at the ballet of the Oper Frankfurt and from 1973 with his Hamburg Ballet. He worked on Neumeier's ballets Romeo und Julia and The Nutcracker (1971), Daphnis et Chloé (1972), Dritte Sinfonie von Gustav Mahler (1975) and Illusionen – wie Schwanensee (1976). He also assisted Neumeyer in freelance productions such as Josephs Legende (Vienna, 1977), The Lady of the Camellias (Stuttgart, 1978), and A Streetcar Named Desire (Stuttgart, 1983),

Barra came to the Spanish National Dance Company (Ballet Nacional de Espana/Clásico, later called Ballet del Teatro Lirico Nacional) in Madrid in 1985 and became a member of the directors' team until 1990. He choreographed there Poema divino to music by Scriabin (1985), commissioned by María de Ávila, the pas de deux Nocturne to music by Dvořák (1986), his version of The Nutcracker, La espera, also known as Antes del albor, on Miguel Ángel Roig-Francolí's Cinco piezas para orquesta and first performed on September 13, 1987, at the Teatro de la Zarzuela in Madrid. Álbum to music by Mendelssohn (1988), a neo-romantic piece in homage of his mentors, and Caín y Abel to music by Rafael Reina (1990). He choreographed for the Washington Ballet Dumky Variations, on Dvorak's Piano Trio in E minor, Op. 90, played live. It was first performed on February 13, 1991.

In the 1990s, Barra helped improve the State School of Dance in Athens. He was called to Berlin again in 1994 by Götz Friedrich; his two years of directing the ballet there were regarded as a time of artistic success. He directed classical ballets for the Bavarian State Ballet: Don Quijote (1991), Swan Lake (1995) and Raymonda (2001), all still in the repertoire as of 2025. Barra choreographed Leyla and Majnun for a company in Istanbul in 1996, Canto General to settings by Mikis Theodorakis of poems by Pablo Neruda for the Greek National Ballet in 2005 and his version of Carmen in 2007 for the ballet of the Staatstheater Karlsruhe directed by Birgit Keil. He trained the ballet of the Royal Opera House in London in 2012 in a production of Las Hermanas in memory of MacMillan's 20th anniversary of death.

== Personal life and death ==
Barra was openly gay. He was the partner of Erik Bruhn, and then for 54 years of Maximo Barra, with whom he lived on Menorca from the 1980s and later in Marbella. His partner died of cancer in 2018.

Barra died in Marbella on March 26, 2025, at the age of 95. Horst Koegler wrote in a 1964 book Ballett in Stuttgart that Cranko made the hero the center of the dramatic action which was possible due to Barra's ability to create characters: upright and masculine with a strong human vitality and the gift to be an adaptable partner. A biography of Barra, Life in Ballet, by Victor Hughes who had collaborated with Neumeier as dancer and ballet master, was published in 2020.
