= Mathieu Ganio =

French ballet dancer

- Born: 16 March 1984 (age 42); Marseille, France
- Education: École Nationale Supérieure de Danse de Marseille, Paris Opera Ballet School
- Occupation: Ballet dancer
- Years active: 2001 to present
- Employer: Paris Opera Ballet
- Height: 182 cm (5 ft 11½ in)
- Parent: Dominique Khalfouni (mother)
- Awards: Prix Benois de la Danse (2005); Officier, Ordre des Arts et des Lettres (2020)

Mathieu Ganio (born 16 March 1984) is a French danseur étoile of the Paris Opera Ballet.

== Biography ==
Mathieu Ganio was born in Marseille, France, the son of Ballet National de Marseille principal dancers Dominique Khalfouni and Denys Ganio. He made his stage debut at two years of age, performing alongside his mother in Roland Petit's Ma Pavlova. He began dance lessons at the age of seven with Colette Armand, mother of dancer Patrick Armand, and studied at the École Nationale Supérieure de Danse de Marseille from 1992 to 1999, before completing his training at the Paris Opera Ballet School. In 2001 he joined the corps de ballet of the Paris Opera Ballet and won promotion to the rank of coryphée in 2002 and sujet in 2003. On 20 May 2004, following a performance of Don Quixote, he was appointed étoile, bypassing the rank of premier danseur. In 2005 he was awarded the Benois de la Danse as outstanding male dancer. On 18 December 2020 he was appointed an officier of the Ordre des Arts et des Lettres.

Ganio's repertoire includes principal roles in Romantic, Classical and dramatic ballets, a broad repertoire of neo-classical works by George Balanchine and Jerome Robbins, ballets by Serge Lifar, Roland Petit, Maurice Béjart, Pierre Lacotte and Angelin Preljocaj, as well as multiple works by John Neumeier, William Forsythe and Wayne McGregor. With the Paris Opera Ballet he has performed in the United States of America, Switzerland, United Arab Emirates, Singapore, Japan and Australia.

On 29 September 2004 Ganio performed in a joint gala by the Paris Opera Ballet and Royal Ballet at the Palais Garnier to mark the centenary of the Entente Cordiale. In August 2005 he performed in The Sleeping Beauty with the Tokyo Ballet at the Bunka Kaikan. At the Mariinsky Theatre in Saint Petersburg he performed in Don Quixote in 2006 and Giselle in 2007. In 2010 appeared in Giselle at Moscow's Stanislavsky and Nemirovich-Danchenko Theatre. In July 2016 Ganio returned to the Mariinsky Theatre to dance in Giselle. In November 2017 he participated in the Men in Motion project, organized by Ivan Putrov, at the London Coliseum. In 2018 Ganio danced the title role in Onegin with the Stuttgart Ballet during a tour to Japan. In April 2019 he returned to London's Coliseum to participate in Putrov's Against the Stream program. On 19 March 2022 Ganio performed at a benefit gala at the Coliseum for Ukrainian war relief.

Mathieu Ganio retired from the Paris Opera Ballet on 1 March 2025, following a performance of Onegin.

His younger sister, Marine Ganio, is a première danseuse of the Paris Opera Ballet.

== Repertoire ==
- La Sylphide (choreography: Pierre Lacotte): James
- Giselle (choreography: Patrice Bart and Eugène Polyakov, after Jean Coralli and Jules Perrot): Count Albrecht
- Coppélia (choreography: Pierre Lacotte, after Arthur Saint-Léon): Frantz
- Paquita (choreography: Pierre Lacotte, after Marius Petipa): Lucien d’Hervilly
- Don Quixote (choreography: Rudolf Nureyev, after Marius Petipa and Alexander Gorsky): Basilio
- The Sleeping Beauty (choreography: Rudolf Nureyev, after Marius Petipa): Prince Désiré
- Swan Lake (choreography: Rudolf Nureyev, after Marius Petipa and Lev Ivanov): Prince Siegfried
- The Nutcracker (choreography: Rudolf Nureyev): Drosselmeyer/Prince
- La Fille mal gardée (choreography: Frederick Ashton): Colas
- Onegin (choreography: John Cranko): title role
- Manon (choreography: Kenneth MacMillan): Des Grieux
- Mayerling (choreography: Kenneth MacMillan): Crown Prince Rudolf
- The Lady of the Camellias (choreography: John Neumeier): Armand Duval
- Proust, ou Les intermittences du coeur (choreography: Roland Petit): Saint-Loup (first interpreter at the Paris Opera Ballet)
- Ivan the Terrible (choreography: Yuri Grigorovich): Prince Kurbsky
- Romeo and Juliet (choreography: Rudolf Nureyev): Romeo, Tybalt
- Cinderella (choreography: Rudolf Nureyev): Movie Star
- La Petite danseuse de Degas (choreography: Patrice Bart): Ballet Master
- Caligula (choreography: Nicolas Le Riche): title role
- Les Enfants du paradis (choreography: José Martinez): Baptiste (first interpreter)
- Le Parc (choreography by Angelin Preljocaj): The Man
- Le Rendez-vous (choreography: Roland Petit): Young Man
- Le Jeune Homme et la Mort (choreography: Roland Petit): Young Man
- Psyche (choreography: Alexei Ratmansky): Eros
- Daphnis and Chloe (choreography: Benjamin Millepied): Daphnis
- Apollo (choreography: George Balanchine): title role
- The Four Temperaments (choreography: George Balanchine): Phlegmatic
- Palais de Cristal (choreography: George Balanchine): First Movement soloist
- Symphony in C (choreography: George Balanchine): First Movement soloist
- La Valse (choreography: George Balanchine)
- Agon (choreography: George Balanchine): first pas de trois
- Brahms-Schoenberg Quartet (choreography: George Balanchine): First Movement soloist (first interpreter at the Paris Opera Ballet)
- Jewels (choreography: George Balanchine): Emeralds, Diamonds
- Who Cares? (choreography: George Balanchine)
- Mozartiana (choreography: George Balanchine)
- Suite en Blanc (choreography: Serge Lifar): Thème varié, Mazurka, Adage
- Études (choreography: Harald Lander)
- Dances at a Gathering (choreography: Jerome Robbins): Man in Brown, Man in Green
- In the Night (choreography: Jerome Robbins): Second pas de deux
- The Goldberg Variations (choreography: Jerome Robbins): Second Couple (first interpreter at the Paris Opera Ballet)
- Other Dances (choreography: Jerome Robbins)
- Opus 19/The Dreamer (choreography: Jerome Robbins)
- The Firebird (choreography: Maurice Béjart): title role
- Serait-ce la mort? (choreography: Maurice Béjart): The Man
- Song of a Wayfarer (choreography: Maurice Béjart): Man in Blue
- Yondering (choreography: John Neumeier)
- The Third Symphony of Gustav Mahler (choreography: John Neumeier): The Man
- Song of the Earth (choreography: John Neumeier; world premiere)
- Another Place (choreography: Mats Ek)
- Stepping Stones (choreography: Jiří Kylián)
- Artifact Suite (choreography: William Forsythe)
- Approximate Sonata (choreography: William Fosythe; first interpreter at the Paris Opera Ballet)
- Woundwork 1 (choreography: William Forsythe)
- Amoveo (choreography: Benjamin Millepied)
- Genus (choreography: Wayne McGregor; world premiere)
- Alea Sands (choreography: Wayne McGregor; world premiere)
- Clair de lune (choreography: Alastair Marriott; first interpreter at the Paris Opera Ballet)
- Grand miroir (choreography: Saburo Teshigawara; world premiere)
- Dogs Sleep (choreography: Marco Goecke; world premiere)
- The Male Dancer (choreography: Iván Pérez; world premiere)

== Filmography ==
- Coppélia (choreography: Pierre Lacotte), Paris Opera Ballet School, 2001: as Frantz
- La Sylphide (choreography: Pierre Lacotte), Paris Opera Ballet, 2004: as James
- Jewels (choreography: George Balanchine), Paris Opera Ballet, 2005: in 'Emeralds'
- Proust (choreography: Roland Petit), Paris Opera Ballet, 2007: as Saint-Loup
- Comme un rêve (documentary directed by Marlène Ionesco), 2009
- La Danse (documentary directed by Frederick Wiseman), 2009
- La Petite danseuse de Degas (choreography: Patrice Bart), 2010: as the Ballet Master
- Les Enfants du paradis (choreography: José Martinez), 2011: as Baptiste
- 'Célébration' (choreography: Pierre Lacotte), Paris Opera Ballet, 2013
- The Sleeping Beauty (choreography: Rudolf Nureyev), Paris Opera Ballet, 2013: as Prince Désiré
- Palais de Cristal (choreography: George Balanchine), Paris Opera Ballet, 2014: as the First Movement soloist
- Dances at a Gathering (choreography: Jerome Robbins), Paris Opera Ballet, 2014: as the Man in Brown
- Giselle (choreography: Konstantin Sergeyev), Mariinsky Ballet, 2016: as Count Albrecht
- Swan Lake (choreography: Rudolf Nureyev), Paris Opera Ballet, 2016: as Prince Siegfried
- Mathieu Ganio, une étoile romantique (documentary directed by Marlène Ionesco), 2018
- Giselle (choreography: Patrice Bart and Eugène Polyakov), Paris Opera Ballet, 2020: as Count Albrecht
- Le Parc (choreography: Angelin Preljocaj), Paris Opera Ballet, 2021: as the Man
- Who Cares? (choreography: George Balanchine), Paris Opera Ballet, 2023
- The Firebird (choreography: Maurice Béjart), Paris Opera Ballet, 2023: as the Firebird
- Stepping Stones (choreography: Jiří Kylián), Paris Opera Ballet, 2023
