= Jiří Jelínek =

Jiří Jelínek may refer to:

- Jiří Jelínek (trumpeter) (1922–1984), Czech painter, illustrator, trumpeter and singer
- Jiří Jelínek (ballet dancer) (born 1977), Czech ballet dancer
- Jiří Jelínek (ice hockey) (born 1979), Czech ice hockey player
