= Roberta Marquez =

Brazilian ballet dancer

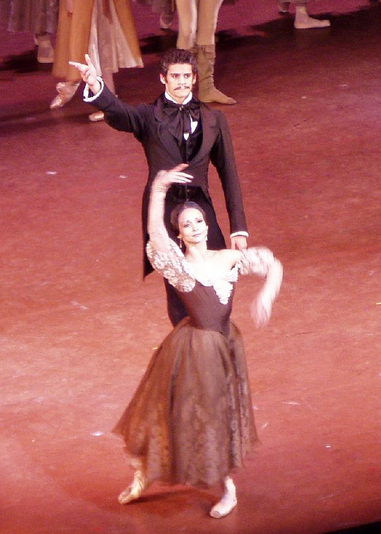
- Roberta Marquez and Thiago Soares at the curtain call of Onegin
- Born: Rio de Janeiro, Brazil
- Education: Maria Olenewa State Dance School
- Occupation: Ballet dancer
- Career
- Former groups: Municipal Theatre Ballet; The Royal Ballet

Roberta Marquez is a Brazilian ballet dancer who was a principal dancer with The Royal Ballet.

== Early life ==
Roberta Marquez was born in Rio de Janeiro to a Peruvian mother and a Portuguese father who was raised in Brazil. She started ballet at age four, and also learned tap, jazz, Spanish and African dance. She later trained at the Maria Olenewa State Dance School.

== Career ==
Marquez joined the Municipal Theatre Ballet in 1994 and became a principal dancer in 2002. In 2004, Marquez joined The Royal Ballet in London. Her repertoire includes classical full-lengths works, and works by Frederick Ashton, Kenneth MacMillan and George Balanchine. Her most notable partner in the company is Steven McRae.

In 2012, she performed at the Paralympics closing ceremony, alongside Thiago Soares, also a Brazilian principal at the Royal Ballet, as well as several visually-impaired dancers from Brazil.

In 2015, the Royal Ballet announced Marquez would leave the company after a performance of Romeo and Juliet in December that year. In the 2016/17 season, she returned to the Royal Ballet as a guest artist, dancing Lise in La fille mal gardée.

== Selected repertoire ==
Marquez's repertoire with the Municipal Theatre Ballet and The Royal Ballet includes:

- Odette/Odile in Swan Lake
- Kitri in Don Quixote
- Swanilda in Coppélia
- The title role in Giselle
- Princess Stephanie in Mayerlin
- The title role in Manon
- The title role in Cinderella
- Nikiya in La Bayadère
- Lise in La fille mal gardée
- Sugar Plum Fairy in The Nutcracker
- Aurora in The Sleeping Beauty
- Juliet in Romeo and Juliet
- Titania in The Dream
- The title role in The Firebird
- The title role in La Sylphide
- Tatiana in Onegin
- Serenade
- Theme and Variations
- Suite en Blanc
- Afternoon of a Faun
- Symphony in C
