= Marianela Núñez =

Argentine-British ballet dancer

Marianela Núñez OBE
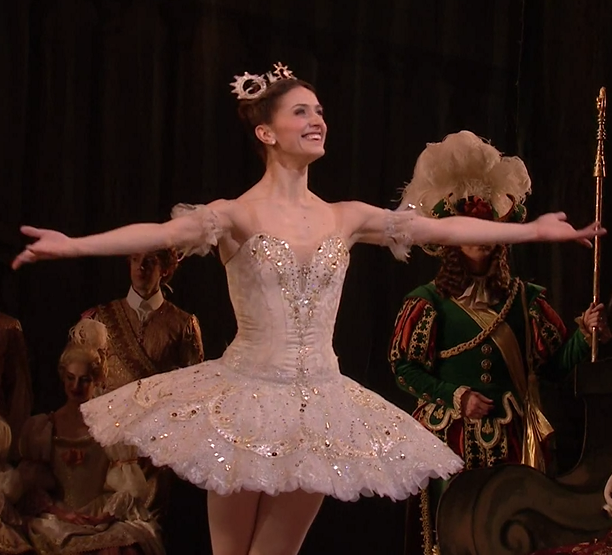
- Núñez as Aurora in The Sleeping Beauty.
- Born: 23 March 1982 (age 44); Buenos Aires, Argentina
- Citizenship: Argentina; United Kingdom
- Education: Teatro Colón Ballet School; The Royal Ballet School
- Occupation: Ballet dancer
- Spouse: Thiago Soares (m. 2011; div. 2015)
- Dancing career
- Current group: The Royal Ballet
- Former groups: Colon Theater Ballet

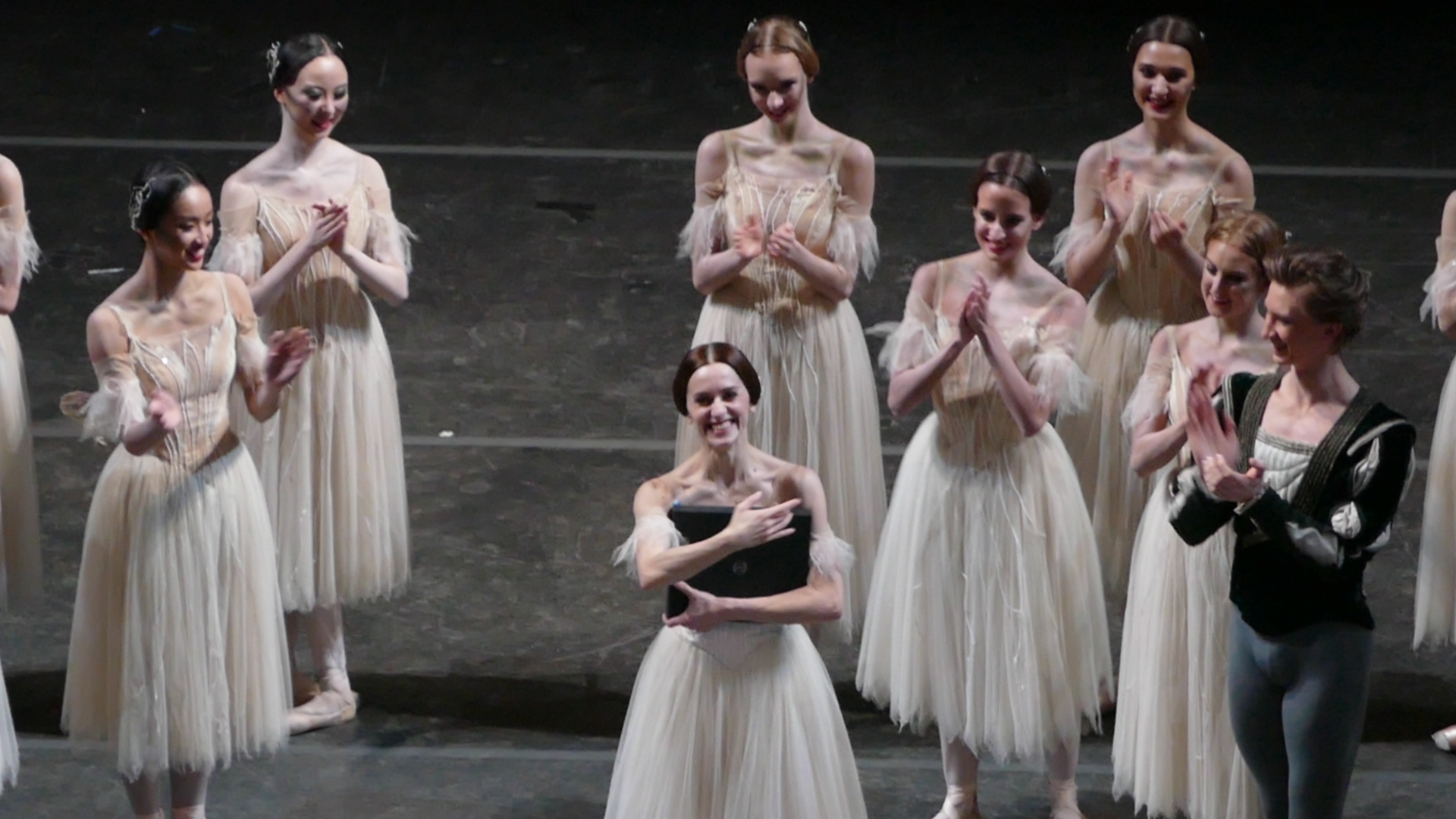
Marianela Nunez on the evening of 1 Feb 2018 marking her 20th anniversary as a member of The Royal Ballet.

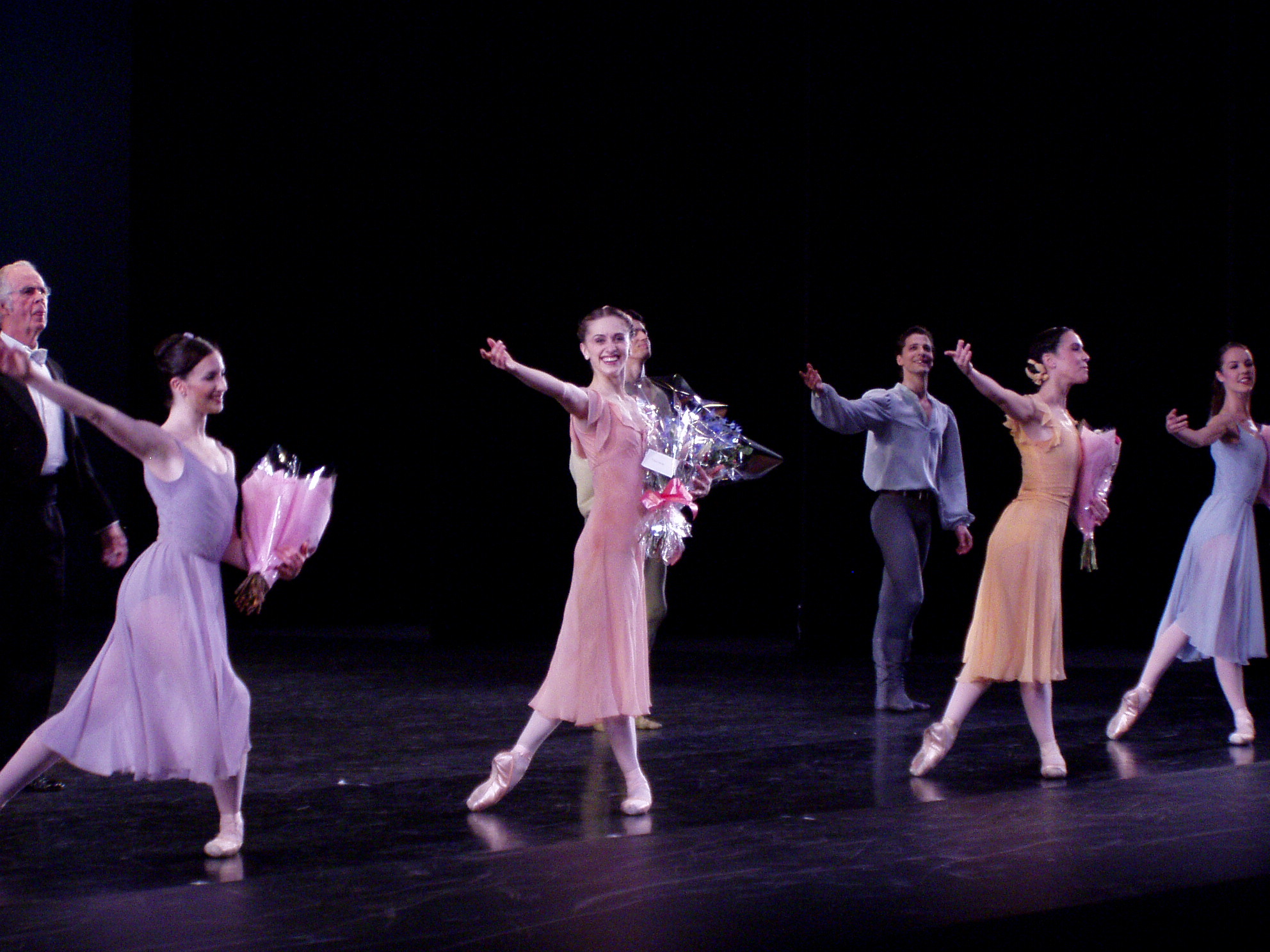
Ballerinas (L-R) Lauren Cuthbertson, Marianela Núñez, Laura Morera and Samantha Raine in Dances at a Gathering, Royal Ballet, 4 June 2008

Marianela Núñez OBE (born 23 March 1982) is an Argentine-British ballet dancer. She is a principal dancer with The Royal Ballet, London.

== Early life ==
Marianela Núñez was born in Buenos Aires, Argentina. She has three older brothers. Her mother sent her to ballet classes when she was three. At first, she took dance classes at her teacher's garage. At age five, Núñez decided to focus on ballet. She entered Teatro Colón Ballet School at age six.

== Career ==
At age 14, halfway through her training, Colon Theater Ballet's lead Maximiliano Guerra chose Núñez to dance with him, and the company selected Núñez to join the company. She danced with the company in both Buenos Aires and on tour, and danced with the company's lead in various roles. In 1997, at age 15, she auditioned for The Royal Ballet when the company was on tour in Los Angeles, even though she didn't speak English. She was offered a contract, but UK employment law prevented her from working in the UK until age 16. She attended The Royal Ballet School instead, and was guaranteed she would be offered a contract the following year. She was promoted to First Soloist, the second highest rank of the company, in 2000.

In 2001, Núñez replaced the injured Leanne Benjamin as Kitri in Don Quixote, with Carlos Acosta as Basilio. She was promoted to principal dancer the following year. She has danced leading roles in both classical and contemporary works by choreographers including Frederick Ashton, John Cranko, Kenneth MacMillan, Wayne McGregor and Christopher Wheeldon. In 2013, she won the Laurence Olivier Award for Outstanding Achievement in Dance for Viscera, Aeternum and 'Diana and Actaeon' from Metamorphosis: Titian 2012.

In 2018, following a performance of Giselle, Núñez celebrated her 20th anniversary at The Royal Ballet. Artistic director Kevin O'Hare declared her "one of the greats of her generation". Present were Lady Sarah Chatto, Peter Wright, Monica Mason, and The Argentine ambassador to the UK Renato Carlos Sersale di Cerisano.

Outside the Royal Ballet, Núñez has made many guest appearances worldwide, including in Austria, the U.S., Italy, Argentina and Australia. She has performed in La Scala Theatre Ballet many times, and is a frequent collaborator of Roberto Bolle. She has also returned to Colón Theater Ballet, where her career started.

== Reviews ==
On Don Quixote, The Guardian wrote that she is "a brilliant exponent of rubato dancing, stretching chosen phrases to breaking point and then flying through the music with ecstatic abandon."

Reviewing Núñez's guest appearance in American Ballet Theatre's Cinderella, the New York Times noted: "effortless attack and enthusiastic impetus made the sequence thrilling."

The Times also praised Núñez's portrayal of Odette/Odile in Swan Lake, saying she "has a pure line, a melting plasticity and a smooth legato quality. Her Odette was lyrical and sorrowful; her Odile steely and sexy."

On Núñez as Nikiya in La Bayadère, The Independent noted she "has luscious musical phrasing and floating line."

== Personal life ==
Núñez married fellow principal at the Royal Ballet, Thiago Soares in 2011 in Buenos Aires. The couple separated in 2014 and announced their divorce in January 2016, but remain friends and continue to dance together.

Núñez is a naturalised British citizen.

== Selected repertoire ==
Núñez's repertoire with The Royal Ballet includes:

- Kitri/Kiteria - Don Quixote
- Swanilda - Coppélia
- Princess Aurora and the Lilac Fairy - The Sleeping Beauty
- Sugar Plum Fairy - The Nutcracker
- Nikiya and Gamzatti- La Bayadère
- Olga and Tatiana - Onegin
- Sylvia - Sylvia
- Lise - La fille mal gardée
- Odette/Odile - Swan Lake
- Juliet - Romeo and Juliet
- Giselle and Myrtha - Giselle
- Cinderella in Cinderella
- Monotones I
- Mitzi Caspar in Mayerling
- Hermione in The Winter's Tale
- Manon in Manon
- Alice in Alice's Adventures in Wonderland
- Ballo della Regina
- Dances at a Gathering
- Natalia Petrovna in A Month in the Country

Created roles

- Infra
- Asphodel Meadows
- "Diana and Actaeon" (Metamorphosis: Titian 2012)
- Human Seasons
- Tetractys
- Carmen (Carlos Acosta)
- Multiverse

== Awards ==
- Best Female Dancer at the Critics' Circle National Dance Awards, 2005, 2012, 2018 and 2022
- Konex de Platino for Best Dancer of the Decade in Argentina, 2009
- María Ruanova Award, 2011
- Laurence Olivier Award for Outstanding Achievement in Dance, 2013
- Appointed Officer of the Order of the British Empire (OBE) for services to dance in the 2025 New Year Honours
