= Jiří Jelínek (ballet dancer) =

Czech ballet dancer (born 1977)

Jiří Jelínek (born 1977) is a Czech ballet dancer. He was a principal dancer with the National Theatre Ballet (Prague) and the Stuttgart Ballet. He joined the National Ballet of Canada as a principal dancer in January 2010. He is known for his combination of a powerful stage presence and his partnering skills. The Czech dancer is particularly renowned for his portrayal of Onegin in John Cranko's Onegin. He has danced with many ballerinas including Polina Semionova, Sue Jin Kang, Bridget Breiner, Alicia Amatriain, Katia Wunsche, Xiao Nan Yu, Sonia Rodriguez, Heather Ogden, Barbora Kohoutková, Tereza Podařilová, Tatiana Juricova, Zuzana Susová, Jayne Smeulders, and Ljubov Andreeva.
