= Ganio =

Ganio or Ganios is a surname. Notable people with the surname include:

- Denys Ganio (born c.1954), French dancer and ballet teacher, ex-étoile of the Ballet de Marseille.
- Mathieu Ganio (born 1984), French dancer, étoile of the Paris Opera Ballet; the son of Denys Ganio and Dominique Khalfouni.
- Tony Ganios (1959–2024), American actor

== See also ==
- Gagnot
