= Initials R.B.M.E. =

Ballet by John Cranko

- Native title: Initialen R.B.M.E.
- Choreographer: John Cranko
- Music: Johannes Brahms
- Premiere: 18 January 1972; Staatsoper Stuttgart
- Original ballet company: Stuttgart Ballet
- Design: Jürgen Rose
- Created for: Richard Cragun; Birgit Keil; Marcia Haydée; Egon Madsen
- Genre: neoclassical ballet

Initials R.B.M.E. (German: Initialen R.B.M.E.) is a ballet choreographed by John Cranko to Brahms' Piano Concerto No. 2. The ballet is plotless, and features four movements, each with a lead dancer. The ballet was created for the Stuttgart Ballet, and the title was named after the dancers that originated the four lead roles, Richard Cragun, Birgit Keil, Marcia Haydée and Egon Madsen. Initials R.B.M.E. premiered on 18 January 1972, at the Staatsoper Stuttgart. It was one of Cranko's most successful ballets, and one of his final works before his sudden death in 1973.

== Production ==
Cranko set Initials R.B.M.E. to Brahms' Piano Concerto No. 2. Cranko choreographed the ballet for the dancers Richard Cragun, Birgit Keil, Marcia Haydée and Egon Madsen. The four had been Cranko's close friends and muses since their early days at Stuttgart Ballet, and their dancing styles were instrumental in shaping Cranko's works there. The title was named after the four, in the order of their appearances in the ballet. The ballet's costumes and sets were designed by Jürgen Rose.

Initials R.B.M.E. premiered on 18 January 1972, at the Staatsoper Stuttgart. In his biography on Cranko, dance critic John Percival described the ballet as one of his most successful works. It is also one of Cranko's final ballets before his sudden death in 1973.

== Choreography ==
Initials R.B.M.E. is a plotless neoclassical ballet. It features four movements, each with a principal dancer and supporting dancers. The four lead dancers appear in others' movements, but these appearances, according to Percival, are "not necessarily to play any very active part, but just to be there, evoking the real-life situation where each was a strongly defined individual with a life or his or her own, but all helped and sustained by their friendship." He added that despite the technically demanding choreography, "the underlying idea helped the performers to give it a sense of being more than just display."

For The Oxford Handbook of Contemporary Ballet, E. Hollister Mathis-Masury wrote, "Cranko’s ballet was a complex mixture of boldness and hauntingly longing lyricism, interlaced with bursts of brio. This piece has the most complex relationship of group to solo Cranko ever produced," while the first and third movements, made for Cragun and Haydée respectively, "are Cranko's strongest interpretation of this music in movement." She added that the ballet is "a vehicle for the individual dancing style of each of his four main muses." New York Times critic Clive Barnes noted the ballet was stylistically similar to Léonide Massine's symphonic ballets, though he believed Cranko had never seen them.
