= Richard Cragun =

American ballet dancer

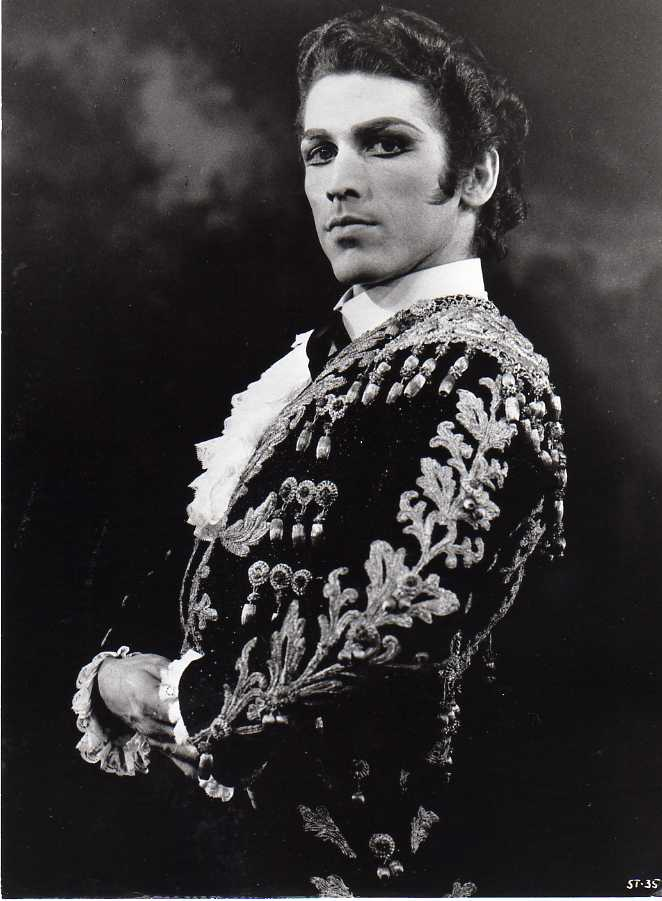
- Born: 5 October 1944; Sacramento, California, U.S.
- Died: 6 August 2012 (aged 67); Rio de Janeiro, Brazil
- Education: Banff School of Fine Arts, Canada; Royal Ballet School, England; Vera Volkova, Denmark
- Occupation: Dancer
- Years active: 1962–2012
- Known for: Stuttgart Ballet
- Partner: Roberto de Oliveira (m. 1998)

Richard Cragun (5 October 1944 – 6 August 2012) was an American ballet dancer, teacher and ballet director who performed with the Stuttgart Ballet in Germany from 1965 to 1996.

Cragun has been called a "prince of the ballet world" and "one of the most important dancers of the twentieth century."

== Early life and training ==
Born in Sacramento, California, Cragun was one three sons. His father was a college librarian. As a child, he was very interested in both music and dance. At age five, he began taking tap dance lessons.

A few years later, Cragun decided to become a professional dancer after his father took him to see Singin' in the Rain (1952). Donald O'Connor, one of the stars of the film, became Cragun's "first, absolute idol". Inspired to emulate O'Connor's lyrical, balletic style of tap dancing, Cragun took ballet classes.

As a teenager, Cragun received a scholarship to the Banff School of Fine Arts in Banff, Alberta. He studied there with Betty Farraly and Gweneth Lloyd. When Alexander Grant was visiting Banff, he was impressed by Cragun's skills. He suggested Cragun to apply to the Royal Ballet School in London.

Cragun spent one year at the Royal Ballet school, working with Errol Addison and Harold Turner. At age 17, Cragun went to Copenhagen, Denmark, to privately train with Vera Volkova, who was responsible for polishing his remarkable classical technique.

== Performing career ==
In 1962, Volkova recommended Cragun to John Cranko, director of the Stuttgart Ballet. Cranko hired him sight unseen, as a member of his corps de ballet.

In 1965, soon after his appointment as principal dancer in Stuttgart, he began his dance partnership with Marcia Haydée. Cragun and Haydée performed Swan Lake, Onegin and The Taming of the Shrew. Their professional partnership at the Stuttgart Ballet lasted from 1965 until Cragun's retirement in 1996.

Besides his appearances with leading companies in Germany, Cragun danced in Denmark, Belgium, the Netherlands, England, Sweden, Italy, Canada, the United States, and Japan. In 1990, during the Stuttgart revival of the Broadway musical On Your Toes, Cragun exhibited his tap dancing skills.

== Critical notices ==
Cragun was described as a big, handsome man, with a powerful physique who danced with dazzling virtuosity and distinct virility, a perfect foil for the brilliant technique and delicate femininity of Haydée. Another description said that Cragun was blessed with a perfect physique for dancing, Cragun was a virtuoso of the ballet stage, equaled by only a few male dancers of his generation. He embodied the explosive, colorful form of classical ballet that was sometimes called "the Stuttgart style." Flawless triple tours en l'air were his trademark, an athletic feat accomplished only by such bravura dancers as Edward Villella and Mikhail Baryshnikov on rare occasions.

Clive Barnes, dance critic for The New York Times, wrote, "He possesses tremendous elevation. There is a cumulative pulse and rhythmic beat to his dancing that is enormously impressive." He won high praise for his performances in principal roles in Cranko's Romeo und Julia, Onegin, and, especially, The Taming of the Shrew. "Cragun was a strikingly handsome Petruchio, by turns self-mocking, overbearing, funny, and tender. The role suited his robustly masculine and charismatic stage personality and provided a first-class showcase for his virtuosity and partnering skills. No dancer has equaled him in the role."

== Roles created ==
In the course of his long career, Cragun created many roles in the ballets of John Cranko and other European choreographers. Among them are the following.

=== Ballets by Cranko ===
- 1963. L'Estro Armonico (Harmonic Inspiration), music by Antonio Vivaldi.
- 1965. Bouquet Garni, music by Giacomo Rossini, arranged by Benjamin Britten.
- 1965. Opus 1, music by Anton Webern (Passacaglia for orchestra).
- 1966. Concerto for Flute and Harp (aka Mozart Concerto), music by W.A. Mozart.
- 1968. Présence, music by Bernd Alois Zimmermann. Role: Don Quichotte.
- 1969. The Taming of the Shrew, music by Domenico Scarlatti, adapted by Karl-Heinz Stolze. Role: Petruchio.
- 1970. Brouillards (Mists), music by Claude Debussy. Role: principal dancer.
- 1970. Poème de l'Estase, music by Alexander Scriabin. Role: principal dancer.
- 1971. Carmen, music by Wolfgang Fortner, with Wilfried Steinbrenner, based on musical motifs of Georges Bizet. Role: Don José.
- 1972. Initials R.B.M.E., music by Johannes Brahms. Role: R (for Richard).
- 1973. Traces, music by Gustav Mahler. Role: principal dancer.

=== Ballets by others ===
- 1963. The Mirror Walkers, choreography by Peter Wright, music by Pyotr Ilyich Tchaikovsky.
- 1963. Quintet, choreography by Peter Wright, music by Jacques Ibert.
- 1965. Das Lied von der Erde (The Song of the Earth), choreography by Kenneth MacMillan, music by Gustav Mahler. Role: Der Mann.
- 1967. Namouna, choreography by Peter Wright, music by Édouard Lalo. Role: Count Ottario.
- 1968. Die Sphinx, choreography by Kenneth MacMillan, music by Darius Milhaud.
- 1973. Voluntaries, choreography by Glen Tetley, music by Francis Poulenc. Role: principal dancer.
- 1975. Daphnis und Chloë, choreography by Glen Tetley, music by Maurice Ravel. Role: Daphnis.
- 1977. Requiem, choreography by Kenneth MacMillan, music by Gabriel Fauré.
- 1978. Die Kameliendame (The Lady of the Camellias), choreography by John Neumeier, music by Frédéric Chopin. Role: Armand.
- 1978, Mein Bruder, Meine Schwestern (My Brother, My Sisters), choreography by Kenneth MacMillan, music by Arnold Schoenberg.
- 1979. Orpheus, choreography by William Forsythe, music by Hans Werner Henze. Role: Orpheus.
- 1981. Forgotten Land, choreography by Jiří Kylián, music by Benjamin Britten. Role: principal dancer.
- 1983. A Streetcar Named Desire, choreography by John Neumeier, music by Sergei Prokofiev. Role: Stanley.
- 1985. Operette, choreography by Maurice Béjart, music by Franz Léhar.
- 1985. Abscheid (Farewell), choreography by Heinz Spoerli, music by Alban Berg.
- 1986. Der Tod in Venedig (Death in Venice), choreography by Norbert Vesak, music by Benjamin Britten. Role: the writer, Gustav von Aschenbach.
- 1987. Dornröschen (The Sleeping Beauty), choreography by Marcia Haydée, music by Pyotr Ilyich Tchaikovsky. Role: Carabosse.
- 1988. Wie Antigone (Like Antigone), choreography by Mats Ek, music by Mikis Theodorakis. Role: Kreon.
- 1991. Stati d'Anima (Moods), choreography by Renato Zanella, music by Igor Stravinsky.
- 1992. Mann im Schatten (Man in the Shadows), choreography by Renato Zanella, music by Richard Farber. Role: Der Mann, the title role.
- 1995. Edward II, choreography by David Bintley, music by John McCabe. Role: Edward.
- 1996. Das Letzte Gedicht (The Last Poem), choreography by Roberto de Oliveira, set to electronic music.

== Personal life ==
Cragun and Haydée shared a romantic relationship and lived together for 16 years. The relationship broke up in 1977 when Cragun realized that he was a gay man. However the two remained friends and colleagues. Haydée bore him no resentment. "Richard was one of the best dancers in the world", she said. "Even after our separation, we were the best of friends."

In later years, Cragun entered a relationship with Brazilian choreographer Roberto de Oliveira that lasted until Cragun's death.

== Later life ==
In his later years with the Stuttgart Ballet, Cragun became one of the company's ballet masters. After finishing his dancing career, he became the ballet director of the Deutsche Oper in Berlin. In 1999, after three unhappy years at the Deutsche Oper, he left the position.

With Haydée's encouragement, Cragun and de Oliveira moved to Brazil, where they launched DeAnima Ballet Contemporáneo for youngsters from the black favelas of Rio de Janeiro. Cragun also became ballet director at the city's Teatro Municipal, where he managed a company of 70 dancers and staged works from the Stuttgart repertory. A talented cartoonist, Cragun also mounted several exhibitions of his work in art galleries and other venues in the city.

In 2005, Cragun suffered a stroke. His poor health was compounded by having HIV/AIDS. On 6 August 2012, Cragun suffered a seizure triggered by a lung infection. He was admitted to a hospital in Rio de Janeiro, where he died soon after.

A friend gave this report of Cragun's funeral:

"The most moving moment at yesterday's cremation ceremony in Rio came when the flower-covered coffin began to move away, and Richard's friends and admirers, led by Marcia Haydée, stood, applauded, and cried out 'Bravo', as they had so many times at the end of his magnificent performances. It was a spontaneous and appropriate ovation and send-off. Richard deserved no less."
