= Thiago Soares =

Brazilian ballet dancer (born 1981)

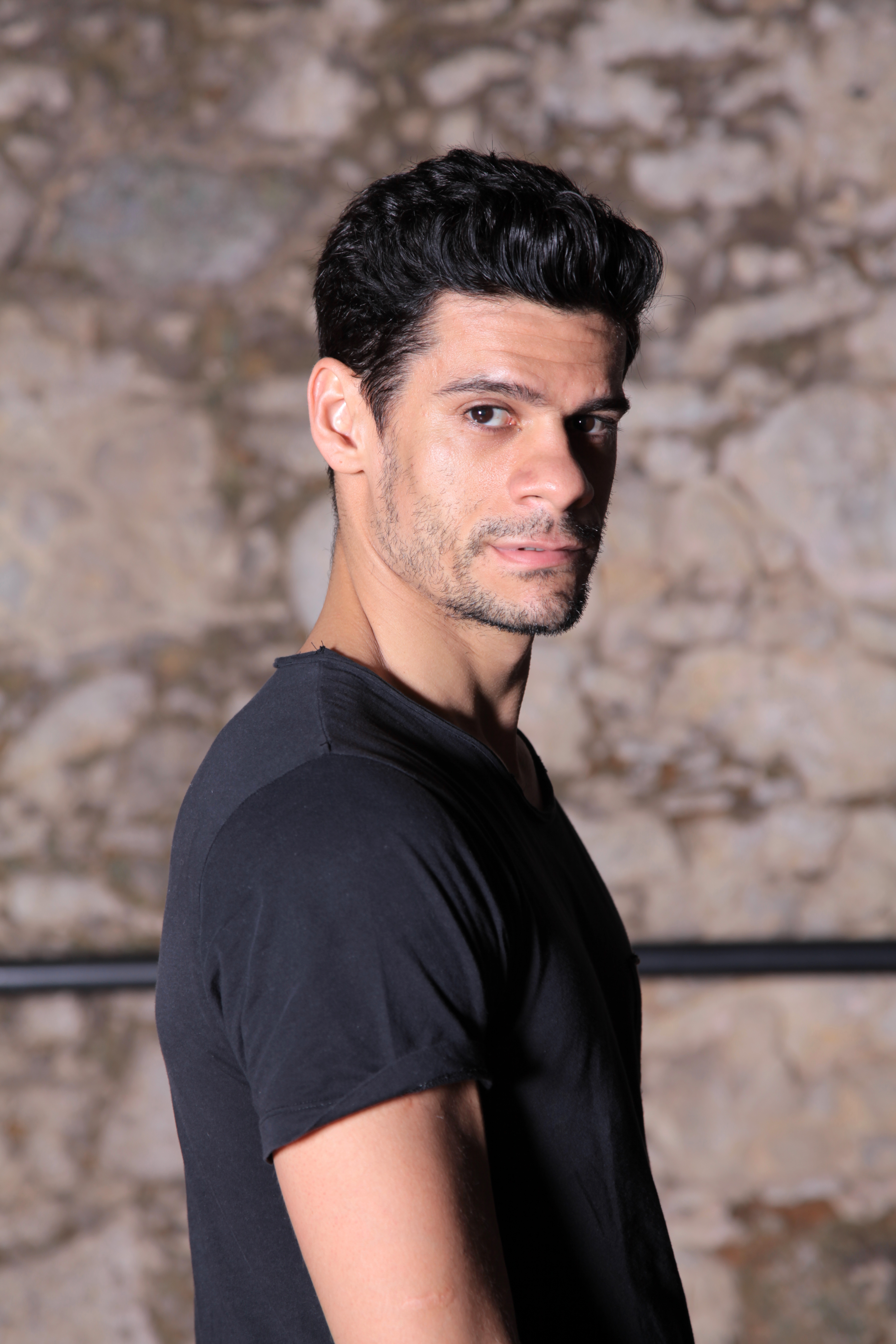
- Born: 1981 (age 44–45); Rio de Janeiro, Brazil
- Occupations: Dancer, artistic director and choreographer
- Spouse: Marianela Núñez (m. 2011; div. 2015)
- Website: thiagosoaresart.com

Thiago Soares (born 1981) is a Brazilian ballet dancer and choreographer. He is a former principal dancer with The Royal Ballet in London, and guest principal in other theatres around the world.

== Early life ==
Thiago Soares Born in Rio de Janeiro, Soares was introduced to dance in a street dance hip hop group of Vila Isabel in Rio de Janeiro. Eventually at 13, he got a scholarship to train to become a professional dancer at the Centre for Dance Rio where was graduated in 1998.

== Career ==
Soares joined the Rio de Janeiro Municipal Theatre Ballet in 1998; where his repertoire included the Prince in The Nutcracker, Siegfried in Natalia Makarova's Swan Lake, Solor in Makarova's La Bayadère, Romeo in Vladimir Vasiliev's Romeo and Juliet, and Basilio in Don Quixote. In 2002, he briefly trained with the Kirov Ballet and danced Siegfried and Basilio and Prince desire with the Russian State Ballet.

Soares joined the Royal Ballet in 2002 as a First Artist and was promoted to Soloist in September 2003, First Soloist in September 2004 and finally, Principal dancer in September 2006 and eventually a principal guest from 2017 to 2019. His repertoire includes the majority of the classics, the title role in John Cranko's production of Onegin, Siegfried in Anthony Dowell's Swan Lake, the Prince in Peter Wright's The Nutcracker, Solor in Makarova's La Bayadére, Prince Florimund in the Monica Mason, Count Albrecht in Sir Peter writer’s Giselle, Colas in sir Frederick Ashton’s La fille mal gardee, Franz in Nineteen de Valois Coopelia, Christopher Newton production of The Sleeping Beauty, the lead Pas de deux in William Forsythe's In the Middle, Somewhat Elevated, Glen Tetley's Voluntaries, Mark Morris' Gong, Ivan Tsarevich in Fokine's The Firebird, the First Movement of Balanchine's Four Temperaments, the Second Movement of Balanchine's Symphony in C, Diamonds in Jewels, Balanchine's Tchaikovsky Pas de deux and the Queen of Fire's Consort in Christopher Wheeldon's Fire variation in Homage to the Queen. His Kenneth MacMillan repertoire includes Tybalt and Romeo in Romeo and Juliet, Rasputin in Anastasia, Lescaut in Manon, Elite Syncopations, Winter Dreams and Rudolf in Mayerling, Requien, (el Pepe) in Las hermanas.

His Frederick Ashton repertoire includes the Thaïs Medatition as de deux, Orion in Sylvia, Colas in La fille mal gardée, Birthday Offering Pas de deux and Awakening Pas de deux, the Prince in Cinderella

He has also created roles in David Bintley's Les Saisons, Will Tucket's The Seven Deadly Sins, Liam Scarlett's Sweet Violets and Wayne McGregor's Raven Girl.

Nowadays, his agenda includes performances as a guest artist in different theatres around the world, and is the artistic director of the Ballet de Monterrey in Mexico and of his own dance studio in Rio de Janeiro, StudioTSmaisdanca. He is a member of the board of the Brazilian institute at King's College London.

== Awards ==
His awards include a silver medal at the Paris International Dance Competition in 1998, a gold medal at the Moscow International Ballet Competition at the Bolshoi Theatre in 2001, and the "Outstanding Classical Dancer" award at the UK 2004 Critic's Circle National Dance Awards 2018 Medal of Cavalier of the order of Rio Branco by the Brazilian government for his services in the Arts. In 2020, he received an honorary doctorate from King's College London.

== Personal life ==
Soares married fellow dancer and frequent partner Marianela Núñez in Buenos Aires in July 2011. They separated in 2014 and announced their divorce in January 2016, but they remain dance partners and friends.

Thiago Soares was portrayed by Matheus Abreu in the 2025 biographical film Um Lobo Entre os Cisnes.

== On DVD ==
In 2005, Soares performed Orion in a filmed performance of Sylvia, alongside Darcey Bussell as Sylvia and Roberto Bolle as Aminta. The performance was later released on DVD. In 2009, Soares performed the lead male role Prince Sigfried in Sir Anthony Dowell’s Swan Lake with Royal ballet which is also available on DVD.
