= Amatriain =

Amatriain is a Basque surname. Notable people with the surname include:

- Alicia Amatriain (born 1980), Spanish ballet dancer
- Xavier Amatriain, business executive at Expedia Group
- Mikel Arteta Amatriain (born 1982), Spanish professional football manager
