= Ana Cardus =

Ballet master

Ana Cardus (born 8 May 1943) is a Mexican former ballerina and ballet master.

Ana Cardus was born on 8 May 1943 in Mexico City.

Until 1960, Cardus danced with Serge Unger's Ballet Concierto de Mexico in Mexico City.

From 1963, she danced with Stuttgart Ballet in Germany, and created roles in John Cranko's l'Estro Armonico (1963), Onegin (1965), The Interrogation (1967), and Quatre Images (1967), and in Kenneth Macmillan's Song of the Earth (1965). She latter danced with Hanover State Opera, where she was also the ballet master.
