= Horst Koegler =

German journalist

Horst Koegler (22 March 1927 – 11 May 2012) was a German dance critic, journalist and writer. He was the editor and author of books on the ballet scene in Germany, as well as the author of essays in journals and introductions to illustrated books. As a reviewer of German and English-language books, he formed a bridge between American and German dance research.

== Life ==
Born in Neuruppin, Koegler studied musicology, German and art history in Kiel from 1945 to 1946 and directing, dramaturgy and acting at the newly founded Staatliche Hochschule für Theater und Musik Halle in Halle an der Saale from 1947 to 1949. He then received a three-year engagement at the Gerhart-Hauptmann-Theater Görlitz-Zittau as assistant dramaturg and director. Since moving to West Berlin in 1951, he worked as a freelance journalist and writer, increasingly for English-language magazines. A stay of several months in the US followed in 1964. He first gained access to his later focus on dance as a reporter of Berlin opera performances. From 1957 to 1959 he was a critic for Die Welt. In 1959 he moved from Berlin to Cologne and in 1977 from Cologne to Stuttgart. There he wrote about the Stuttgart Ballet and, from 1977 to 1992, as music editor, left his mark on the dance reviews of the Stuttgarter Zeitung. However, he did not pursue his task as a critic exclusively in the field of dance, but also remained active as a music and opera critic. From 1965 onwards, he published an annual chronicle of the ballet year and published several ballet encyclopaedias. During his lifetime, he donated his dance-related document collection to the German Dance Archive Cologne as the Horst Koegler Archive. From 2001 until his death, he ran his blog, the koeglerjournal, on the internet dance portal tanznetz.de. In it, he published reviews and thoughts on events in the dance world, detached from the press.

== Koegler's importance for dance ==
With his writing about and for ballet in particular, "Horst Koegler [...] made dance journalism a serious business again" and he was considered one of the most important dance critics of his time in Germany. Thus Koegler "prepared the way for the choreographer Hans van Manen by writing" and wrote in Stuttgart "with an always nimble, often flickering and always espritful pen at close quarters about the Stuttgart ballet miracle under Cranko". For Koegler, the future of dance lay in ballet and his credo "I believe in beauty as the true virtue of classical ballet" was combined with a negative attitude towards the dance theatre developing at the end of the 1960s. As a consequence, "an artificially imposed schism between ballet and dance theatre [...] arose that was nowhere else pursued as doggedly as in this country".

Koegler died in Stuttgart at the age of 85.

== Awards ==
- Julius Bab Critics' Prize of the Association of German Folk Theatre Societies, 1986
- Deutscher Tanzpreis, 1992
- John Cranko Preis der Stuttgarter John-Cranko-Gesellschaft, 2004

== Work ==
=== Lexika ===
- The Concise Oxford Dictionary of Ballet. Second edition (Updated, 1987), Oxford University Press | New York.
- Kleines Wörterbuch des Tanzes. Reclam, Stuttgart 1999 (with Klaus Kieser: 2nd, newly edited edition 2006, 3rd, revised and updated edition 2009 as Wörterbuch des Tanzes).
- Dizionario Gremese della Danza e del Balletto. Italian edition a cura di Alberto Testa. Gremese, Rome 1995.
- Reclams Ballettlexikon. With Helmuth Günther. Stuttgart, 1984. ISBN 3-15-010328-2
- The concise Oxford dictionary of ballet. Oxford University Press, 1977. (1982, 1987).
- Friedrichs Ballettlexikon. Friedrich Verlag 1972

=== Chronicles ===
- Ballett 1965: Chronik und Bilanz des Ballettjahres. 1965 Friedrich Verlag
- also chronicles of the following years

=== Monographs ===
- Heinz Spoerli, Weltbürger des Balletts. (with contributions of Claude Conyers among others) Verlag Neue Zürcher Zeitung, Zürich 2012.
- John Neumeier – Bilder eines Lebens. Hamburg, 2010.
- Stuttgart Ballet. Fotos von Leslie E. Spatt. London, 1978.
- Ballett in Stuttgart: Werkstattgespräch mit John Cranko. Eine Chronik seit 1960. Photos by Madeline Winkler-Betzendahl. Stuttgart, 1964.
- Balanchine und das moderne Ballett. Hannover, 1964.
- Yvonne Georgi. Reihe Theater heute. Hannover, 1963.
- Ballett international. Versuch einer Bestandsaufnahme. Rembrandt, Berlin 1960.
