= Las Hermanas (ballet) =

1963 one-act ballet by Kenneth MacMillan

Las Hermanas is a one-act ballet created by Kenneth MacMillan in 1963 for the Stuttgart Ballet. The music is Frank Martin's Harpsichord Concerto (1952). The piece is loosely based on The House of Bernarda Alba by Federico García Lorca.

The first performance was in 1963 at the Staatstheater Stuttgart performed by the Stuttgart Ballet. The principal characters were danced by Marcia Haydee, Ray Barra and Birgit Keil.

== Original cast ==
Württembergisches Staatstheater Stuttgart, 13 July 1963:

- Marcia Haydée
- Birgit Keil
- Ray Barra
- Ruth Papendick
