= Kurt-Heinz Stolze =

German pianist, harpsichordist and composer

Kurt-Heinz Stolze (26 January 1926 – 12 August 1970) was a German pianist, harpsichordist and composer.

He was born in Hamburg. He studied piano, organ and conducting at the Hamburg Conservatory with Wilhelm Brückner-Rüggeberg. His first engagement was as repetiteur at the Royal Opera, Copenhagen. In 1957 he joined the Württemberg State Theatre in Stuttgart. That year he accompanied Fritz Wunderlich on his recording of Franz Schubert’s Die schöne Müllerin. He can also be heard as one of the harpsichordists on a recording of concertos for three and four harpsichords by Johann Sebastian Bach, conducted by Gunther Kehr. Thereafter, he focussed mainly on ballet, and worked principally with John Cranko.

Kurt-Heinz Stolze composed or arranged the music for Cranko's ballets Wir reisen nach Jerusalem (1963), L’Estro Armonico (1963, after Antonio Vivaldi), The Taming of the Shrew (Der widerspenstigen Zähmung) (1969; to the Shakespeare story; music based on sonatas by Domenico Scarlatti), and Kyrie eleison (1968; based on music by Bach).

However, he is perhaps best known for the ballet Onegin (1965), based on Alexander Pushkin's verse play Eugene Onegin, for which Stolze used the music of Tchaikovsky, but not a note from Tchaikovsky's opera of the same name. Instead, he orchestrated some little-known piano works by Tchaikovsky such as The Seasons, along with themes from the opera Cherevichki and the latter part of the symphonic fantasia Francesca da Rimini. He also produced Cranko's Swan Lake and Les Sylphides and worked in radio and cinema.

In 1968 he appeared as harpsichordist with the Württemberg Chamber Orchestra conducted by Jörg Faerber in the Queen Elizabeth Hall in London. He died in Munich in August 1970, aged 44.

== Sources ==
- John Cranko - Choreographien
- Kurt-Heinz Stolze: Sa biographie
