= The Seasons (Tchaikovsky) =

Piano work by Tchaikovsky

- by Pyotr Ilyich Tchaikovsky
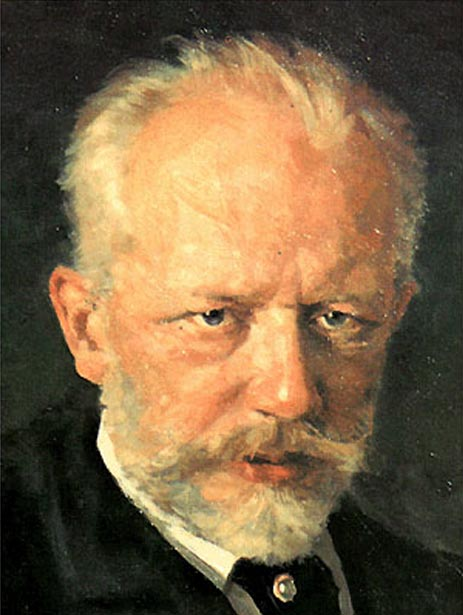
- Portrait of Tchaikovsky by Nikolai Dimitriyevich Kuznetsov
- English: The Seasons
- Native name: Времена года
- Opus: 37a, 37b
- Genre: Piano suite
- Movements: 12

The Seasons, Op. 37a (also seen as Op. 37b; Russian: Времена года; published with the French title Les Saisons), is a suite of twelve short character pieces for solo piano by the Russian composer Pyotr Ilyich Tchaikovsky. Each piece is the characteristic of a different month of the year in Russia. The work is also sometimes heard in orchestral and other arrangements by other hands. Individual excerpts have always been popular – Troika (November) was a favourite encore of Sergei Rachmaninoff, and Barcarolle (June) was enormously popular and appeared in numerous arrangements (including for orchestra, violin, cello, clarinet, harmonium, guitar and mandolin).

== Background ==
The Seasons was commenced shortly after the premiere of Tchaikovsky's First Piano Concerto, and continued while he was completing his first ballet, Swan Lake.

In 1875, Nikolay Matveyevich Bernard, the editor of the St. Petersburg music magazine Nouvellist, commissioned Tchaikovsky to write 12 short piano pieces, one for each month of the year. Bernard suggested a subtitle for each month's piece. Tchaikovsky accepted the commission and all of Bernard's subtitles, and in the December 1875 edition of the magazine, readers were promised a new Tchaikovsky piece each month throughout 1876. The January and February pieces were written in late 1875 and sent to Bernard in December, with a request for some feedback as to whether they were suitable, and if not, Tchaikovsky would rewrite February and ensure the remainder were in the style Bernard was after. March, April and May appear to have been composed separately; however the remaining seven pieces were all composed at the same time and written in the same copybook, and evidence suggests they were written between 22 April and 27 May. The orchestration of Swan Lake was finished by 22 April, leaving the composer free to focus on other music; and he left for abroad at the end of May. This seems to put the lie to Nikolay Kashkin's published version of events, which was that each month the composer would sit down to write a single piece, but only after being reminded to do so by his valet.

The epigraphs that appeared on publication of the pieces were chosen by Bernard, not by Tchaikovsky. In 1886 the publisher P. Jurgenson acquired the rights to The Seasons and the piece has been reprinted many times.

Tchaikovsky did not devote his most serious compositional efforts to these pieces; they were composed to order, and they were a way of supplementing his income. He saw the writing of music to a commission as just as valid as writing music from his own inner inspiration; however, for the former he needed a definite plot or text, a time limit, and the promise of payment at the end. Most of the pieces were in simple ABA form.

== Structure ==
The 12 pieces with their subtitles are:

1. January: At the Fireside (A major)
2. February: Carnival (D major)
3. March: Song of the Lark (G minor)
4. April: Snowdrop (B♭ major)
5. May: Starlit Nights (G major)
6. June: Barcarolle (G minor)
7. July: Song of the Reaper (E♭ major)
8. August: Harvest (B minor)
9. September: The Hunt (G major)
10. October: Autumn Song (D minor)
11. November: Troika (E major)
12. December: Christmas (A♭ major)

=== Poetic epigraphs ===
Following is a translation of some of the poetic epigraphs contained in the Russian edition (all chosen by the publisher Nikolay Bernard):

1. Janvier (January): Au coin du feu (At the Fireside)
  January
  A little corner of peaceful bliss,
  the night dressed in twilight;
  the little fire is dying in the fireplace,
  and the candle has burned out.
  (Alexander Pushkin)
2. Février (February): Carnaval (Carnival)
  February
  At the lively Mardi Gras
  soon a large feast will overflow.
  (Pyotr Vyazemsky)
3. Mars (March): Chant de l'alouette (Song of the Lark)
  March
  The field shimmering with flowers,
  the stars swirling in the heavens,
  the song of the lark
  fills the blue abyss.
  (Apollon Maykov)
4. Avril (April): Perce-neige (Snowdrop)
  April
  The blue, pure snowdrop — flower,
  and near it the last snowdrops.
  The last tears over past griefs,
  and first dreams of another happiness.
  (A. Maykov)
5. Mai (May): Les nuits de mai (Starlit Nights)
  May
  What a night! What bliss all about!
  I thank my native north country!
  From the kingdom of ice, from the kingdom of snowstorms and snow,
  how fresh and clean May flies in!
  (Afanasy Fet)
6. Juin (June): Barcarolle (Barcarolle)
  June
  Let us go to the shore;
  there the waves will kiss our feet.
  With mysterious sadness
  the stars will shine down on us.
  (Aleksey Pleshcheyev)
7. Juillet (July): Chant du faucheur (Song of the Reaper)
  July
  Move the shoulders,
  shake the arms!
  And the noon wind
  breathes in the face!
  (Aleksey Koltsov)
8. Août (August): La moisson (Harvest)
  August
  The harvest has grown,
  people in families cutting the tall rye down to the root!
  Put together the haystacks,
  music screeching all night from the hauling carts.
  (A. Koltsov)
9. Septembre (September): La chasse (Hunting)
  September
  It is time! The horns are sounding!
  The hunters in their hunting dress
  are mounted on their horses;
  in early dawn the borzois are jumping.
  (A. Pushkin, Graf Nulin)
10. Octobre (October): Chant d'automne (Autumn Song)
  October
  Autumn, our poor garden is all falling down,
  the yellowed leaves are flying in the wind.
  (Aleksey Konstantinovich Tolstoy)
11. Novembre (November): Troïka (Troika)
  November
  In your loneliness do not look at the road,
  and do not rush out after the troika.
  Suppress at once and forever
  the fear of longing in your heart.
  (Nikolay Nekrasov)
12. Décembre (December): Noël (Christmas)
  December
  Once upon a Christmas night
  the girls were telling fortunes:
  taking their slippers off their feet
  and throwing them out of the gate.
  (Vasily Zhukovsky)

=== Orchestral and other arrangements ===
A number of musicians have orchestrated Tchaikovsky's pieces.

- 1942 Aleksandr Gauk arranged The Seasons for symphony orchestra.
- Czech composer Václav Trojan did so as well.
- 1951 Morton Gould retained the piano part for many of the pieces and orchestrated the work throughout, recording it with himself at the piano for American Columbia.
- 1965 Kurt-Heinz Stolze orchestrated a number of the pieces as part of the music for John Cranko's ballet Onegin.
- 1989 David Matthews (for orchestra)
- Peter Breiner (for violin and orchestra)
- Georgii Cherkin (for piano and orchestra)
- 1988 French composer Philippe Sarde arranged the Barcarolle as a main theme for The Bear.
- Aleksandr Gedike made an arrangement for piano trio.
- 2011 Eduard Grigoryan's arrangement for two guitars was recorded by his sons, Slava and Leonard Grigoryan.
- 2011 Sergei Abir created a new orchestra version.
- 2020, Jessie Montgomery and Jannina Norpoth premiered a new arrangement with the Orpheus Chamber Orchestra at Carnegie Hall on January 25, 2020, under the direction of Vadim Gluzman.
- 2025 the Dudok Quartet Amsterdam arranged and recorded a selection for their album Tchaikovsky - String Quartets Vol. 2.
