= Alicia Amatriain =

Spanish ballet dancer

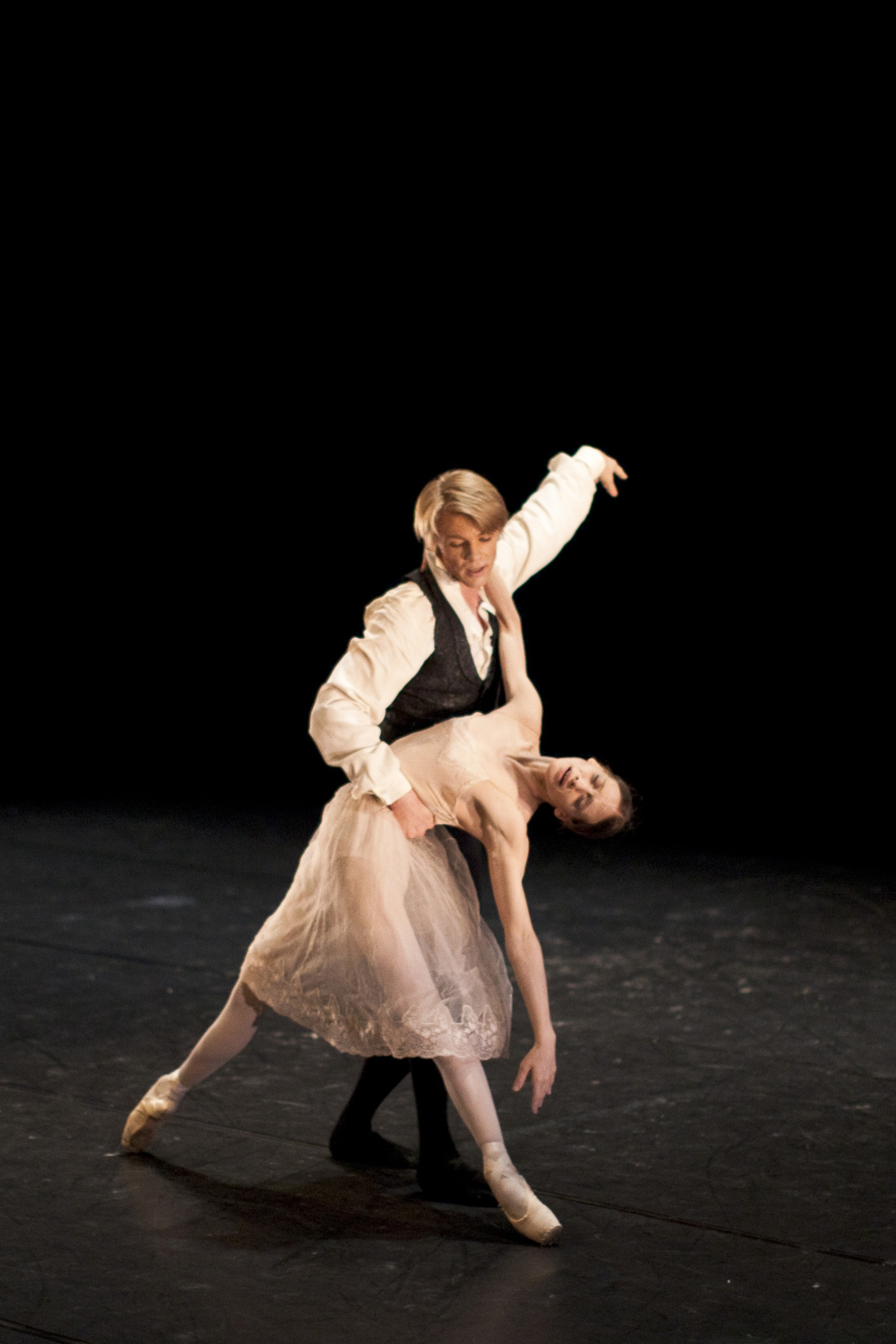
- Alicia Amatriain and Marijn Rademake in Lady of the Camellias
- Born: 1980 (age 44–45); San Sebastián, Spain
- Occupation: Ballet dancer
- Years active: 1998–2022
- Partner: Alexander McGowan
- Children: 1
- Career
- Former groups: Stuttgart Ballet
- Dances: Ballet

Alicia Amatriain (born 1980) is a Spanish ballet dancer. She was a principal dancer at the Stuttgart Ballet.

== Biography ==
Amatriain was born in San Sebastián, Spain. She first learned ballet there and later trained at John Cranko Schule in Stuttgart. She graduated in 1998 and joined Stuttgart Ballet as an apprentice. A year later, she was promoted to the corps de ballet. In 2002, she was named principal dancer. In 2015, Amatriain was awarded Kammertänzerin, the highest honour a dancer can receive in Germany. The following year, she won a Prix Benois de la Danse for her performance in A Streetcar Named Desire and The Soldier's Tale. Amatriain has also made guest appearances in Russia, France, Cuba, Argentina and Germany. She had also appeared in Roberto Bolle's gala, Roberto Bolle and Friends.

Amatriain has danced John Cranko's works such as Tatiana in Onegin, Odette/Odile in Swan Lake and Juliet in Romeo and Juliet. She has also danced works by John Neumeier, William Forsythe and Hans van Manen. She created roles for many choreographers, including the lead role in Christian Spuck's Lulu.

In April 2022, Amatriain announced her retirement due to a hip injury.

== Selected repertoire ==
Amatriain's repertoire with the Stuttgart Ballet included:

- A Midsummer Night’s Dream: Hermia
- A Streetcar named Desire: Blanche du Bois
- Afternoon of a Faun
- Apollo: Terpsichore
- Boléro: The Melody
- Dances at a Gathering: Role in Pink and Role in Mauve
- Don Quijote: Kitri
- Le Grand Pas de deux
- Giselle: Giselle
- La Sylphide: The Sylph
- Lady of the Camellias: Marguerite Gautier, Manon, Olympia
- Le Sacre du Printemps: Pas de deux
- Mayerling: Countess Marie Larisch
- Onegin: Tatiana
- Romeo and Juliet: Juliet
- Serenade
- The Sleeping Beauty: Aurora
- Song of the Earth: female leading role
- Swan Lake: Odette/Odile
- Symphony in C: 1st and 2nd Movement
- Theme and Variations

=== Created roles ===
- A.Memory: Solo role
- Arcadia
- Aus Ihrer Zeit
- Dark Glow
- Das Fräulein von S.: diamond
- Deux
- Don Quijote (Maximiliano Guerra): Dulcinea
- Dummy Run
- E=mc²
- EDEN / EDEN
- Egurra
- Fanfare LX
- Goecke at the Kammertheater: The Nutcracker: Snow Fairy
- Hamlet: Ophelia
- Hikarizatto: Solo role
- Il Concertone
- Krabat: Worschula
- Lulu. A Monstre Tragedy: title role
- Miniatures
- Mono Lisa
- Nautilus
- Nightlight
- nocturne
- Orlando: Queen Elizabeth I.
- Orphée et Euridice: solo role
- RED in 3.
- Salome: The Moon
- Songs
- still.nest
- Take Your Pleasure Seriously
- The Dying Swan (Renato Arismendi after Mikhail Fokine)
- The Shaking Tent
- The Soldier's Tale: The Devil
- Yantra

== Awards and honours ==
- Kammertänzerin, 2015
- Der Faust, Darstellerin Tanz (dancer) for the devil in Demis Volpi's Die Geschichte vom Soldaten (The Soldier's Tale)
- Prix Benois de la Danse, 2016
- Birgit Keil Prize, 2022

== Personal life ==
Amatriain's partner is Stuttgart Ballet soloist Alexander McGowan. In 2019, Stuttgart Ballet announced that the couple was expecting their first child. Therefore, Amatriain did not participate in the company's tour to Taiwan. In March 2020, Amatriain announced the birth of their daughter.
