= Madeline Winkler-Betzendahl =

German woman photographer

Madeline Winkler-Betzendahl (1899–1995) was a German photographer.

== Life and work ==
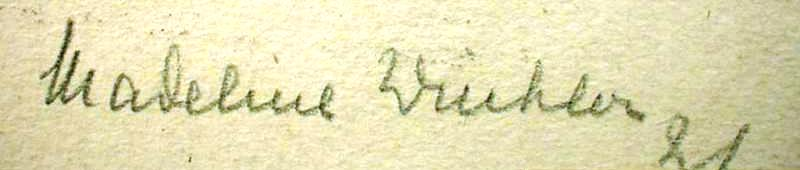
Signature 1921

Born in Berlin, Winkler was the daughter of a British mother and a German father. The doctor's daughter initially studied painting in Berlin and Paris. After the NS policy began to take action against so-called "degenerate art", however, she no longer saw a future in it and began, initially as an autodidact, to take photographs. This was followed by training as a photojournalist at the Verein der Deutschen Presse in Berlin; Winkler passed her exams in 1942. As a photographer, she concentrated on "non-political" theatre photography. She became known through pictures of a Clavigo production with Will Quadflieg in the leading role. She then became the Schiller Theatre's in-house photographer, but occasionally worked for other theatres in Berlin. During World War II she married the naval officer Rudolf Betzendahl (1892–1978). She fled to southern Germany before the effects of the bombing war. While her archive was lost, she was able to save two Leica cameras and began working again in Stuttgart shooting fashion for the Deutsche Illustrierte before becoming the house photographer at the Stuttgart Chamber Theatre. From 1948 to 1982 she had a permanent contract with the Staatstheater Stuttgart. In addition to actors, she often portrayed writers; among other things, she documented Thomas Mann's visit to Stuttgart in 1955. The Stuttgarter Zeitung employed Winkler-Betzendahl as a theatre photographer from 1960. Many of her pictures were published in Theater heute. The Süddeutscher Rundfunk broadcast It Remembers: Madeline Winkler-Betzendahl in 1986:

Winkler-Betzendahls died in Stuttgart. Her archive is largely housed in the Deutsches Theatermuseum in Munich. The Deutsches Literaturarchiv Marbach preserves some of the photographer's portraits of writers.
