= Dominique Khalfouni =

French ballet dancer (born 1951)

Dominique Khalfouni (born 1951) is a French ballet dancer. Once a star (étoile) of the Paris Opera Ballet and a principal of the Ballet National de Marseille, she is now a ballet teacher.

== Biography ==
Born in 1951, she attended the Paris Opera Ballet School from the age of nine, joined the corps de ballet when she was 16 and became the company's étoile in 1976. If not dancing, her other career aspirations were to be a musician: violinist or pianist.

== Career ==
In addition to dancing the leads in many of the classics, she performed roles created for her in Kenneth MacMillan's Métaboles, Oscar Araiz' Adagietto, Maurice Béjart's Serait-ce la Mort and Roland Petit's Le Fantome de l'Opéra.

In 1980 she left Paris to join the Ballet National de Marseille and the following year she appeared with the American Ballet Theatre at the invitation of Mikhail Baryshnikov, to dance Giselle at the Metropolitan Opera House with him.

As a star dancer in Marseille, she excelled in La Pavlova especially created for her by Petit in 1986. After being premiered in Barcelona's Liceu, the international press referred to her as the greatest French dancer of her time, calling her ballerina assoluta.

Turning to teaching by the end of the 1990s, she lived and worked in Paris.

Her two children, Mathieu Ganio and Marine Ganio, are both dancers with the Paris Opera Ballet.

== Awards ==
- Ordre national du Mérite (1987)
- Prix Benois de la Danse (1995)
