= Jiří Jelínek (ice hockey) =

Czech ice hockey player

- Born: May 24, 1979 (age 45); Kladno, Czechoslovakia
- Height: 5 ft 10 in (178 cm)
- Weight: 194 lb (88 kg; 13 st 12 lb)
- Position: Defence
- Shot: Left
- Played for: HC Kladno; SK Kadaň; HK Kralupy nad Vltavou; HC Berounští Medvědi; HC Plzeň; BK Mladá Boleslav; HC Slovan Ústečtí Lvi; HC Ostrava; MHK Kezmarok; HK Poprad; Erding Gladiators; Beibarys Atyrau; MsHK Zilina; HC Havlíčkův Brod; HC Rakovník
- Playing career: 1997–2019

Jiří Jelínek (born May 24, 1979) is a Czech professional ice hockey defenceman. He played with HC Kladno in the Czech Extraliga during the 2010–11 Czech Extraliga season.

== Career statistics ==
			Regular season					Playoffs
Season	Team	League	GP	G	A	Pts	PIM	GP	G	A	Pts	PIM
1997–98	HC Kladno	Czech	1	0	0	0	0	—	—	—	—	—
1997–98	SK Kadaň	Czech3	—	—	—	—	—	—	—	—	—	—
1998–99	Rytiri Kladno U20	Czech U20	—	—	—	—	—	—	—	—	—	—
1998–99	HC Kladno	Czech	36	0	2	2	8	—	—	—	—	—
1999–00	HC Kladno U20	Czech U20	1	1	0	1	4	—	—	—	—	—
1999–00	SK Kadaň	Czech2	30	1	1	2	12	—	—	—	—	—
1999–00	HK Kralupy nad Vltavou	Czech3	3	1	0	1	10	—	—	—	—	—
2000–01	SK Kadaň	Czech2	48	5	7	12	30	—	—	—	—	—
2001–02	SK Kadaň	Czech2	38	1	5	6	59	5	0	3	3	6
2002–03	SK Kadaň	Czech2	37	1	8	9	76	—	—	—	—	—
2003–04	HC Berounští Medvědi	Czech2	39	2	4	6	99	10	1	3	4	37
2003–04	HC Plzeň	Czech	—	—	—	—	—	3	1	0	1	0
2004–05	HC Plzeň	Czech	2	0	0	0	0	—	—	—	—	—
2004–05	HC Kladno	Czech	25	0	3	3	35	4	0	0	0	6
2005–06	BK Mladá Boleslav	Czech2	21	0	0	0	12	—	—	—	—	—
2005–06	HC Slovan Ústečtí Lvi	Czech2	8	1	0	1	8	—	—	—	—	—
2005–06	HC Ostrava	Czech2	8	0	0	0	27	—	—	—	—	—
2006–07	HC Berounští Medvědi	Czech2	38	3	7	10	60	—	—	—	—	—
2007–08	HC Berounští Medvědi	Czech2	31	0	5	5	26	—	—	—	—	—
2008–09	MHK Kezmarok	Slovak	52	2	7	9	110	—	—	—	—	—
2009–10	HK Poprad	Slovak	26	0	0	0	12	—	—	—	—	—
2009–10	MHK Kezmarok	Slovak2	1	0	0	0	4	—	—	—	—	—
2009–10	HC Berounští Medvědi	Czech2	3	0	0	0	4	—	—	—	—	—
2010–11	HC Kladno	Czech	1	0	0	0	0	—	—	—	—	—
2010–11	HC Berounští Medvědi	Czech2	38	2	7	9	77	4	0	0	0	14
2011–12	Erding Gladiators	Germany3	40	5	5	10	78	—	—	—	—	—
2012–13	Erding Gladiators	Germany3	10	1	4	5	16	—	—	—	—	—
2013–14	Beibarys Atyrau	Kazakhstan	36	4	6	10	46	10	0	0	0	2
2014–15	MsHK Zilina	Slovak	13	0	1	1	4	—	—	—	—	—
2014–15	HC Havlíčkův Brod	Czech2	8	0	2	2	20	—	—	—	—	—
2018–19	HC Rakovník	Czech4	—	—	—	—	—	—	—	—	—	—
Czech totals			65	0	5	5	43	7	1	0	1	6
Czech2 totals			347	16	46	62	510	19	1	6	7	57
