= Alastair Marriott =

Alistair Marriott is an English ballet choreographer and principal character artist of The Royal Ballet.

== Biography ==
Marriott was born in St Margaret's at Cliffe, Kent, England. He began studying dance at the Deal Dance Centre, before entering professional ballet training at the Royal Ballet School. He joined The Royal Ballet in 1988 and danced a varied repertoire before being promoted to Principal Character Artist in 2003. Outside of The Royal Ballet, he has also danced with Adventures in Motion Pictures, in Matthew Bourne's production of Swan Lake. Marriott is also a choreographer, and has produced works for both The Royal Ballet and Royal Ballet School, including ballets which have been nominated for the National Dance Awards. He has also choreographed a pas de deux for Darcey Bussell, which was performed at the Sadler's Wells Theatre, and also choreographed The Red Shoes for Bussell's theatre tour Viva la Diva.

== Selected repertoire ==
- Baron von Rothbart in Swan Lake
- Drosselmeyer in The Nutcracker, choreographed by Sir Peter Wright
- Dr Coppélius in Coppelia, choreographed by Dame Ninette de Valois
- High Brahmin in La Bayadere, choreographed by Rudolph Nureyev
- Kostcheï in The Firebird, choreography by Mikhail Fokine
- Step-Sister in Cinderella, choreographed by Sir Frederick Ashton
- Widow Simone in La fille mal gardée, choreographed by Sir Frederick Ashton
