= Marcia Haydée =

Brazilian ballet dancer, choreographer and ballet director

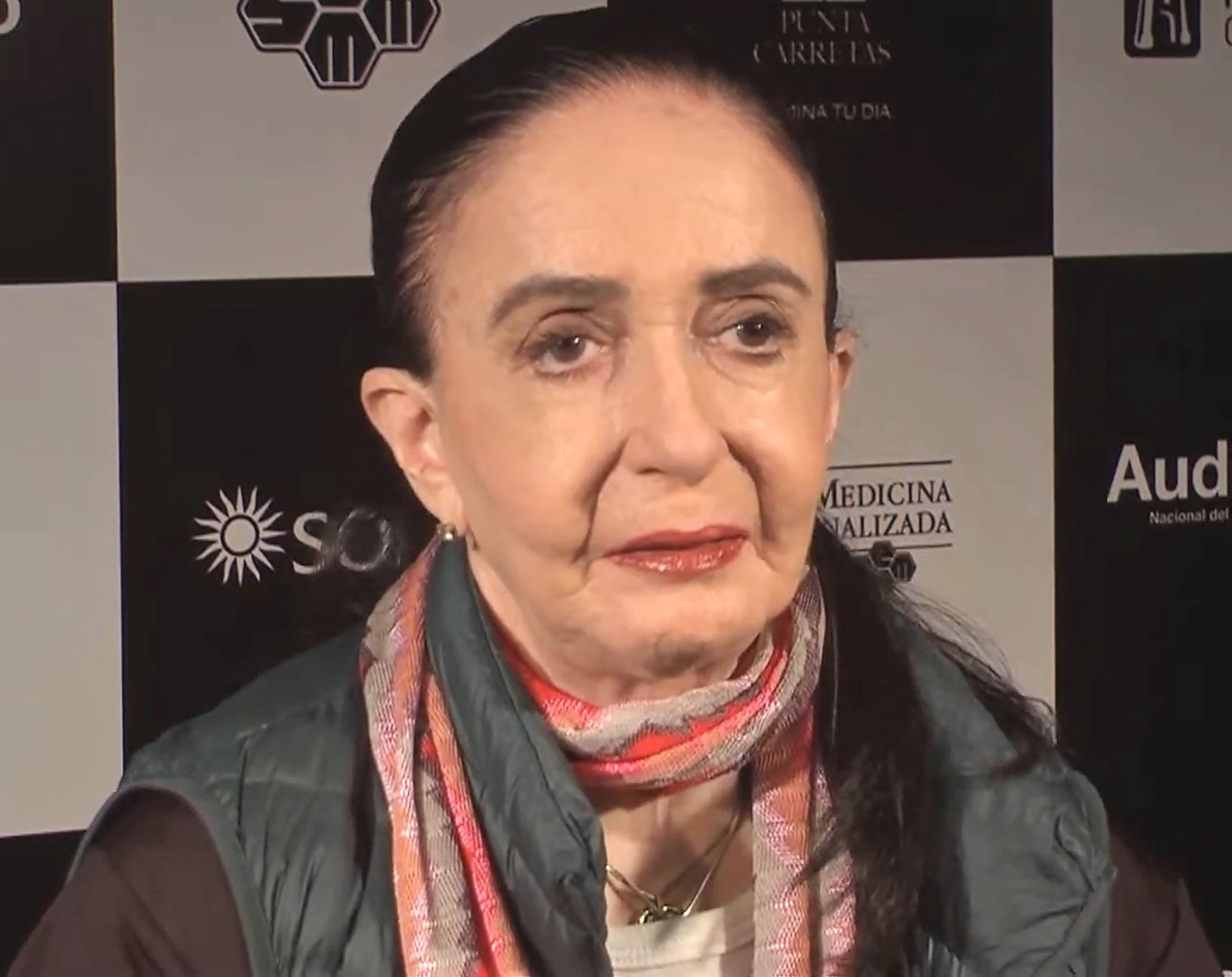
- Haydée in 2017
- Born: Marcia Haydée Salaverry Pereira da Silva; 18 April 1937 (age 89); Niterói, Rio de Janeiro state, Brazil
- Education: Royal Ballet School
- Occupations: Ballet dancer; Choreographer; Ballet director
- Years active: 1957–
- Organizations: Stuttgart Ballet; Santiago Ballet
- Awards: Deutscher Tanzpreis; Knight Commander of the Order of Merit of Germany; Prix de Lausanne Life Time Achievement Award

Marcia Haydée Salaverry Pereira da Silva (born 18 April 1937) is a Brazilian ballet dancer, choreographer and ballet director. She was prima ballerina of the Stuttgart Ballet under John Cranko and succeeded him as the company's director, serving from 1976 to 1995. She has been director of the Santiago Ballet since 1992.

== Career ==
Born in Niterói, Haydée studied with several masters, joined the Royal Ballet School in London and then the Grand Ballet du Marquis de Cuevas (Monaco) in 1957. She entered the Stuttgart Ballet in 1961, where she was named the Prima ballerina the following year. With John Cranko, she created roles in full-length ballets, such as Juliet in Romeo and Juliet (1962), Tatiana in Onegin and Kate in The Taming of the Shrew. She said:

I gave myself to Cranko almost like a virgin: fresh, unformed. Now dancers want to be great in their own right and for their own persona. They don't want to lend themselves as creative vehicles, or be molded by another's inspiration.

A frequent dance partner in Stuttgart was for 30 years Richard Cragun, beginning with Romeo and Juliet. Her performance as Kate received a review in The Times:

It is difficult to believe that Marcia Haydée never played comedy before. She absolutely is the Shrew. As she prepares to pounce (elbows going back, shoulders forward and knees slightly bending) the trepidation of her intended victim is understandable ... Haydée matches him in speed and brilliance, and the duet when they finally admit their love is full of incredibly difficult (but so smoothly done) Bolshoi-style lifts, throws and catches.

Kenneth MacMillan created for her parts in Stuttgart in Las Hermanas, based on Lorca's The House of Bernarda Alba in 1963, The Song of the Earth with Mahler's music Das Lied von der Erde in 1965, and Requiem after Fauré's Requiem in 1976. John Neumeier created for her roles such as the Lady of the Camellias with music by Frédéric Chopin premiered in 1978, and Blanche in A Streetcar Named Desire. Maurice Béjart created roles for her in the full-length production Wien, Wien, nur du allein, in Divine, a ballet about Greta Garbo, in Isadora (1976) and Gaiete Parisienne, among others, shown both in Stuttgart as with his company in Brussels.

After Cranko's death, Haydée was from 1976 to 1995, director of the Stuttgart Ballet. She has also been the director of the Santiago Ballet, the ballet of the Municipal Theatre of Santiago in Chile, from 1992 to 1996, and again from 2003.

Haydée appeared in several films, documentations of her work as well as filmed ballet. She appeared in the dance film Die Kameliendame, directed by John Neumeier and produced by the NDR in 1986–87. She took part in the film Golgotha, filmed in Germany and Bulgaria from 1992 to 1994, directed by Mikhail Pandoursky. She played in the 2000–02 German literary film Poem – Ich setzte den Fuß in die Luft und sie trug, directed by Ralf Schmerberg. Jean Christophe Blavier, her partner in ballet for many years, produced in 2006 a documentary DVD M. for Marcia. Marcia Haydée – die Tanzlegende des 20. Jahrhunderts. ( ... the dance legend of the 20th century). He produced the documentary Marcia Haydée – Das Schönste kommt noch! (The best is still to come!) in 2007, first broadcast by 3sat on 15 December 2007. Haydée can also be seen playing the role of the Nurse in a filmed Stuttgart Ballet performance of Cranko's Romeo and Juliet; the DVD release also includes a 93 minute interview with Haydée about her life and career.

She published John Cranko (with an introduction by Walter Erich Schäfer) in 1973 and Mein Leben für den Tanz (My life for the dance) in 1996.

== Awards ==
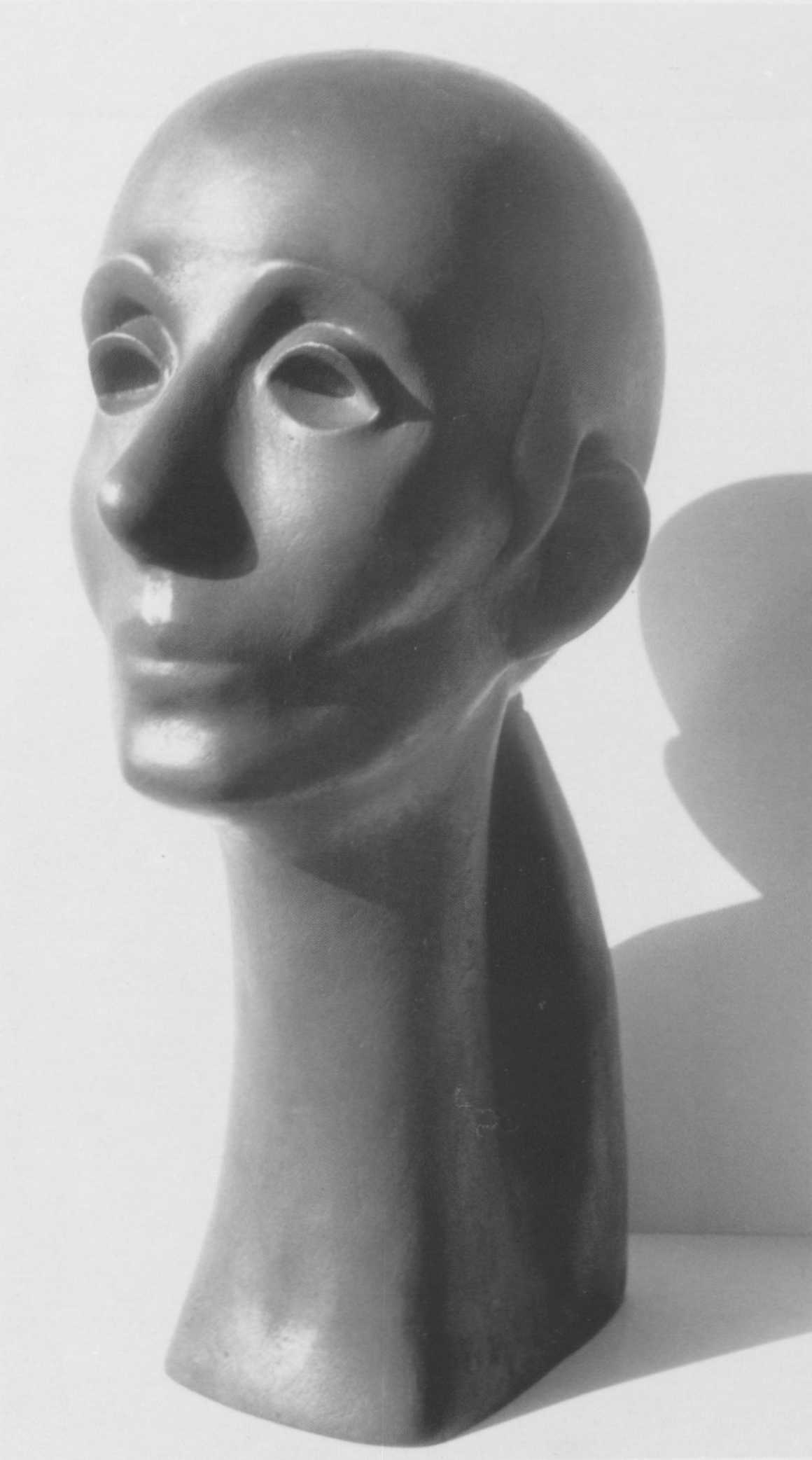
1990 sculpture by Eva Zippel

In 1989, Haydée was awarded the Deutscher Tanzpreis, in 2003 the Nijinsky Award. She received the Order of Cultural Merit of Brazil in 2004. The State of Baden-Württemberg honoured her with the Staufer Medal in 2007. Stuttgart made her an honorary citizen, she is an honorary professor of the University of Stuttgart and the University of Mannheim. She was awarded Germany's Order of Merit (Großes Verdienstkreuz mit Stern) in March 2009. In 2019, she received the Life Time Achievement Award from the Prix de Lausanne.

== Literature ==
- Cornelia Stilling-Andreoli: Marcia Haydée – Divine. Fotografien von Gundel Kilian, Henschel-Verlag, Berlin 2005, 216 pp. ISBN 3-89487-504-6
- Felipe J. Alcoceba und Brigitte Schneider: Dance & dancers Stuttgart Ballet. Edition Braus, Heidelberg 1997 Catalogue of an exhibition at the Württembergische Landesbibliothek in collaboration with the Stuttgarter Ballett for the Stuttgart Ballet Festival: Hommage à John Cranko and the project TanzRegion of the cultural region Stuttgart 1997), ISBN 3-89466-205-0
- Maurice Béjart und Rainer Woihsyk (ed): Marcia Haydée. Belser, Stuttgart, Zürich 1987, 136 p., ISBN 3-7630-9041-X
- Hannes Kilian: Stuttgarter Ballett. Auf neuen Wegen. Kunstverlag Weingarten, Weingarten 1981, 271 pp. ISBN 3-921617-45-6
- Hannes Kilian, Heinz-Ludwig Schneiders, Horst Koegler, John Percival: Marcia Haydee. Porträt einer großen Tänzerin. Thorbecke Verlag, Sigmaringen 1975, ISBN 3-7995-2002-3
