= Xiao Nan Yu =

Canadian ballet dancer

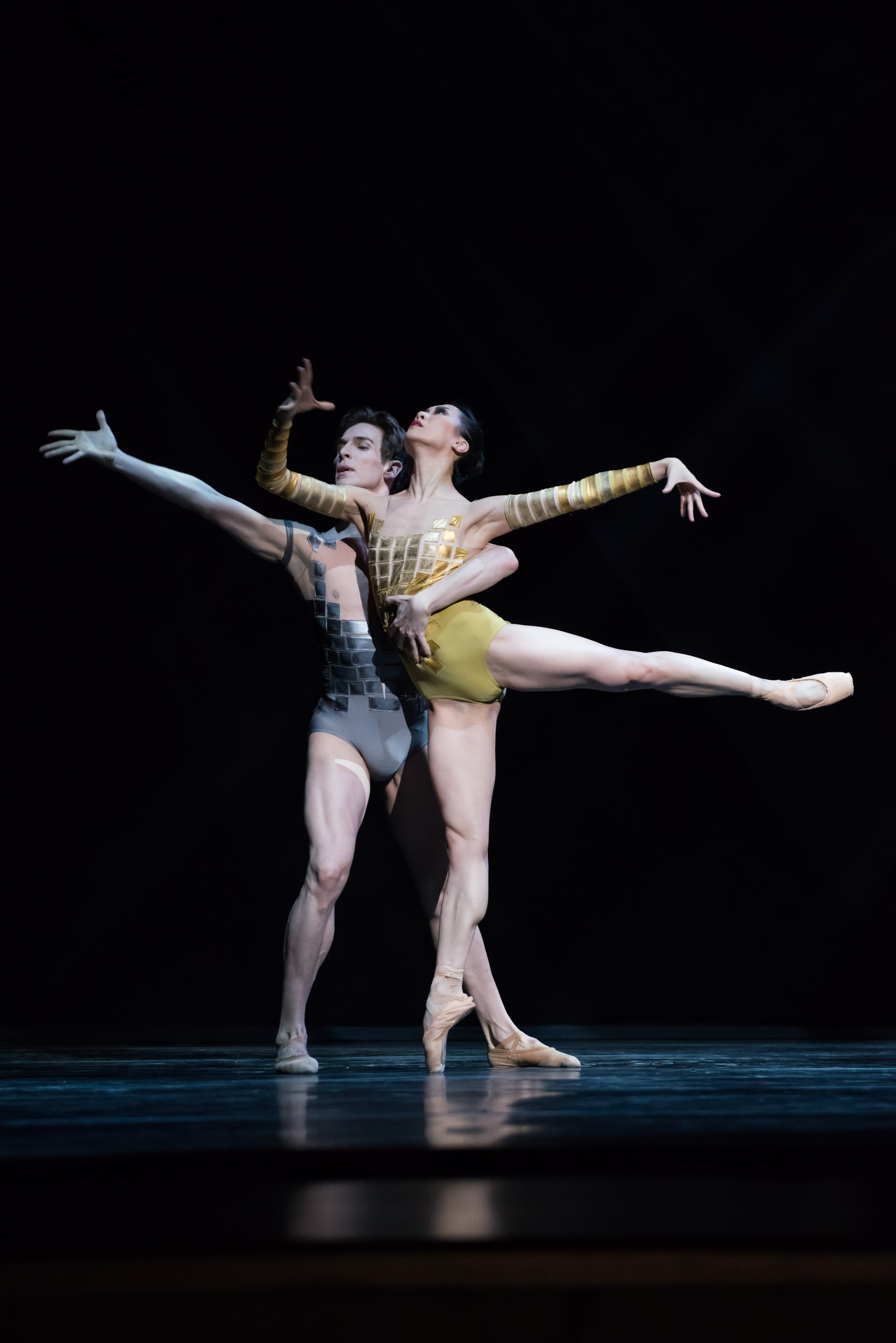
- Xiao Nan Yu and Evan McKie at The National Arts Centre In Ottawa
- Born: 1977/1978; Dalian, China
- Citizenship: Canadian
- Occupation: Ballet dancer

Xiao Nan Yu (Chinese: 于晓楠; pinyin: Yú Xiǎonán; born 1977/1978) is a principal dancer in the National Ballet of Canada. As of 2016 she lives in Toronto, Ontario.

== Early life ==
Yu was born in Dalian, China. She studied at the Shenyang School of Dance (part of the Shenyang Conservatory of Music) under Xie Huizhen, and in 1991 received a performance prize in the junior division of the national Tao Li Cup (桃李杯). She went on to the Beijing Dance Academy, and then moved to Canada in 1995 to attend the National Ballet School on a scholarship.

== Career ==
In 2000, Yu, a second soloist, performed the role of Tatiana in the ballet Onegin. In 2001 she became a principal dancer, and she danced the role of Tatiana again in 2003.

In 2008 Yu took part in a dance show set to the music of the Rolling Stones.

In 2013 Yu performed as Odile in Swan Lake. In 2015 she played the role of Pauline in an adaptation of Shakespeare's The Winter's Tale. In 2016 Yu once again danced as Tatiana at the Four Seasons Centre for the Performing Arts.
