= Onegin (Cranko) =

1965 ballet created by John Cranko

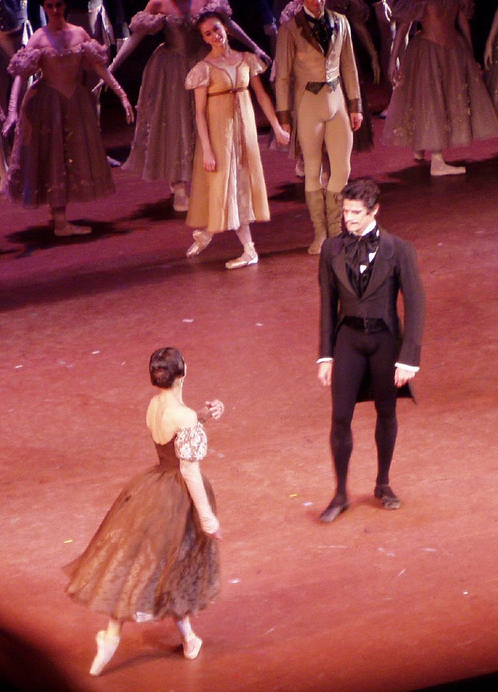
- Roberta Marquez and Thiago Soares in Onegin at the Royal Opera House
- Choreographer: John Cranko
- Music: Pyotr Ilyich Tchaikovsky arrangements by Kurt-Heinz Stolze
- Based on: Eugene Onegin by Alexander Pushkin
- Premiere: 13 April 1965; Staatstheater Stuttgart
- Original ballet company: Stuttgart Ballet
- Setting: 19th-century Russia

Onegin is a ballet created by John Cranko for the Stuttgart Ballet that premiered on 13 April 1965 at Staatstheater Stuttgart. The ballet was based on Alexander Pushkin's 1825–1832 novel Eugene Onegin, to music by Pyotr Ilyich Tchaikovsky and arrangements by Kurt-Heinz Stolze. The ballet has since been in the repertoires of The Australian Ballet, National Ballet of Canada, American Ballet Theatre and The Royal Ballet.

== Background and production ==
Cranko first discovered Alexander Pushkin's verse-novel Eugene Onegin when he choreographed the dances for Tchaikovsky's opera of the same name in 1952. He first proposed a ballet based on Pushkin's story to the Royal Opera House board in the 1960s, but it was turned down, and he pursued the idea when he moved to Stuttgart. The Stuttgart Ballet premiered the work in 1965. The Royal Ballet did not present the work until 2001. The choreography for his ballet includes a wide range of styles, including folk, modern, ballroom and acrobatic. The music takes inspiration from the composer he worked with when he was first introduced to the story – Kurt-Heinz Stolze arranged music by Tchaikovsky, which came principally from his piano works rather than his orchestral works, to accompany the dancers. (Note: The Tchaikovsky works on which Stolze drew for the score were The Seasons, Op. 37, Nocturne No. 4, Op. 19, Three pieces for piano, Op. 9, Six Pieces for piano, Op. 19, Six Pieces for piano, Op. 51, 18 Pieces for piano, Op. 72, the opera Cherevichki, Francesca da Rimini, Op. 32, and the Romeo and Juliet Fantasy-Overture.) The original principals were Marcia Haydée as Tatiana, Ray Barra as Onegin, Egon Madsen as Lensky and Ana Cardus as Olga.

Between 1965 and 1967 Cranko revised Onegin several times. His scenario originally ended with Tatiana kissing her children goodnight, which he decided lessened the drama of her final encounter with Onegin. Cranko also deleted the prologue, in which Onegin was seen at his uncle's deathbed. The standard version of the ballet was first performed by the Stuttgart company in October 1967.

Onegin was added to The Australian Ballet's repertoire in 1976, first performed by Marilyn Rowe and John Meehan. Some dancers were coached by Haydée. The National Ballet of Canada first performed Onegin in 1984 in Toronto. Veronica Tennant and Luc Amyot were originally scheduled to star in the premiere, but withdrew due to injuries. Sabina Allemann and Frank Augustyn replaced them. The production was staged by then-Stuttgart Ballet principal dancer Reid Anderson. Anderson himself performed with the National Ballet alongside Karen Kain the following year.

American Ballet Theatre debuted Onegin in 2001 at the Metropolitan Opera House. Tatiana and Onegin were danced by Julie Kent and Roberto Bolle. Later that year, The Royal Ballet made their company premiere, with Tamara Rojo and Adam Cooper in the lead roles. Both productions were staged by Anderson and choreologist Jane Bourne. The Paris Opera Ballet first performed Onegin in 2009, starring Hervé Moreau and Isabelle Ciaravola. Both Ciaravola and Mathias Heymann, who played Lensky, were named étoile at the curtain call of that performance.

As the sets and costumes became fragile, the National Ballet invited Santo Loquasto to redesign the production, which debuted in 2010. ABT started using Loquasto's design in 2012. Other companies that have danced Onegin include Houston Ballet, Boston Ballet, Hamburg Ballet, Berlin State Ballet and La Scala Theatre Ballet.

== Synopsis ==
Setting: 1820s, Russia

Act 1

Madame Larina's garden

In the garden, Madame Larina, her daughters Olga and Tatiana, and the nurse are finishing party dresses and discussing Tatiana's upcoming birthday celebrations. They think about the future, and the local girls play an old folk game: whoever looks into the mirror will see her beloved. Lensky, a young poet engaged to Olga, arrives with a friend from Saint Petersburg. He introduces Eugene Onegin, who has come to the country to see if it can offer him any distraction from city life. Tatiana falls in love with the handsome stranger, who seems so different from the country people she knows, while Onegin only sees a naive, romantic girl.

Tatiana's bedroom

That night, Tatiana dreams of Onegin, her first love. She writes him a passionate love letter, which she asks her nurse to deliver.

Act 2

Tatiana's birthday

The local gentry have all arrived to celebrate Tatiana's birthday. Onegin finds the company boring and is struggling to be polite. He is also annoyed by Tatiana's letter, which he thinks is just an outburst of adolescent love. He seeks Tatiana out and tears up her letter, telling her that he cannot love her. Prince Gremin, a distant relative of Tatiana who is in love with her, appears. Madame Larina hopes they will make a good match, but Tatiana hardly notices him as she is so distressed. Onegin decides to provoke Lensky by flirting with Olga, hoping it will relieve his boredom. Olga joins in with the joke, but Lensky takes it seriously and challenges Onegin to a duel.

The duel

Tatiana and Olga try to reason with Lensky but he insists the duel must go ahead. Onegin kills his friend.

Act 3

St Petersburg

Years later, Onegin returns to St. Petersburg after travelling the world. He goes to a ball at the palace of Prince Gremin. Onegin is surprised when he recognises the beautiful Princess Tatiana as the country girl he once turned away. He realises how much he lost through his previous actions.

Tatiana's boudoir

Onegin writes to Tatiana and reveals his love. He asks to see her but she does not wish to see him. She pleads with her husband not to leave her alone that evening. Onegin comes and declares his love for her. Tatiana feels Onegin's change of heart has come too late. And even if she still loves him she has now a new life with Prince Gremin and also after having killed Lensky she would never want Onegin again. She tears up his letter and orders him to leave her forever.

== Casts ==
| Role | World premiere (1965) | The Australian Ballet premiere (1976) | National Ballet of Canada premiere (1984) (Note: Veronica Tennant and Luc Amyot were originally scheduled to star in the National Ballet of Canada premiere, but withdrew due to injuries. Sabina Allemann and Frank Augustyn replaced them.) | La Scala premiere (1993) | American Ballet Theatre premiere (2001) | The Royal Ballet premiere (2001) | Paris Opera Ballet premiere (2009) | National Ballet of Canada new production premiere (2010) | 2017 DVD |
|---|---|---|---|---|---|---|---|---|---|
| Tatiana | Marcia Haydée | Marilyn Rowe | Sabina Allemann | Carla Fracci | Julie Kent | Tamara Rojo | Isabelle Ciaravola | Xiao Nan Yu | Alicia Amatriain |
| Onegin | Ray Barra | John Meehan | Frank Augustyn | Rex Harrington | Robert Hill | Adam Cooper | Hervé Moreau | Jiří Jelínek | Friedemann Vogel |
| Lensky | Egon Madsen | Kelvin Coe | Raymond Smith | Vittorio D'Amato | Vladimir Malakhov | Ethan Stiefel | Mathias Heymann | Guillaume Côté | David Moore |
| Olga | Ana Cardus | Maria Lang | Cynthia Lucas | Elisabetta Armiato | Maria Riccetto | Alina Cojocaru | Myriam Ould-Braham | Heather Ogden | Elisa Badenes |

== Reception ==
After the Stuttgart premiere the ballet critic of The Times rated the piece enjoyable but not wholly successful. He found the score unmemorable and the characters sketchy: "Solitary introverts are difficult to depict in dancing". By 1974, when the Stuttgart company presented the piece at Covent Garden shortly after Cranko's death, the critic John Percival reassessed the work much more favourably, praising both the music and the narrative expertise of the choreography. The work has continued to divide critical opinion. In 2004 The Independent called it "a weak piece [missing] the story's depth, its psychological understanding". Three years later the critic in The Sunday Times found that the work's "acutely expressive choreography ... never fails to enthral... Cranko's handling of the Pushkin story as dance is masterly." Other comments have included "compelling but dramatically flawed", "magnificent ... a neck-pricking five-star triumph, "stodgily operatic" and "a sad, beautiful ballet, a true romance with four finely drawn leading characters and a grown-up poignance rarely found."

== Music score ==
For the music score to Onegin, Cranko invited German musician and conductor Kurt-Heinz Stolze (then the Kapellmeister for Stuttgart Ballet) to arrange and orchestrate a compilation of solo piano and orchestral pieces from different compositions by Tchaikovsky. Stolze used selections from five solo piano opuses (from The Seasons, Op. 37a, Op. 19, and Op. 72), selections from the opera Cherevichki, Op. 9 (as a main musical theme for Tatiana and Onegin), the symphonic fantasy Francesca da Rimini, Op. 32, the symphonic ballad The Voyevoda, Op. 3, a duet from the incomplete opera Romeo and Juliet, and Impromptu from Two Piano Pieces, Op. 1.

== Videography ==
In 2017, Stuttgart Ballet released a DVD, featuring Alicia Amatriain as Tatiana, Friedemann Vogel as Onegin, David Moore as Lensky and Elisa Badenes as Olga, Marcia Haydée, who originated the role of Tatiana, appeared as Tatiana's and Olga's nurse. In light of the impact of the COVID-19 coronavirus pandemic on the performing arts, Stuttgart Ballet released the recording online.
