= La fille mal gardée (Ashton) =

1960 ballet by Frederick Ashton

- Choreographer: Frederick Ashton
- Music: Ferdinand Hérold
- Premiere: 28 January 1960; Royal Opera House, London
- Original ballet company: The Royal Ballet
- Design: Osbert Lancaster
- Type: Comic ballet

La fille mal gardée (English: The Wayward Daughter, literal translation: "The Poorly Guarded Girl"), Frederick Ashton's Royal Ballet production, began in 1959 when British choreographer Frederick Ashton created a new version of La fille mal gardée for the Royal Ballet of London. This production premiered on 28 January 1960, with Nadia Nerina as Lise, David Blair as Colas, Stanley Holden as the Widow Simone, and Alexander Grant as Alain. Since its inception Ashton's staging has become a celebrated classic of the ballet repertory.

== Background ==
Originally Ashton intended to use the 1864 score of Peter Ludwig Hertel, as it had been used for nearly every revival of the ballet since the late 19th century, but after close inspection of this music Ashton decided it would not suit his plans for the revival. At the suggestion of the ballet historian and musicologist Ivor Guest, Ashton studied the 1828 score by Ferdinand Hérold, and found the light, simple music more suitable for his conception.

Ashton then commissioned the Royal Opera House's composer and conductor John Lanchbery to orchestrate and edit Hérold's score. After becoming frustrated with the underdeveloped nature of this music, Ashton and Lanchbery decided that Hérold's music would be better used as a foundation for an entirely new score, for which Lanchbery would compose a few new numbers. They went even further by incorporating passages of the original pastiche music from the premiere of 1789 into the score, as well as one number from Hertel's score which was utilised for the famous Clog Dance.

Ashton was disappointed that Hérold's score contained no suitable Grand pas, and for a while considered using the well-known La Fille mal gardée pas de deux. Ivor Guest found a violin reduction of the pas de deux that Fanny Elssler had arranged for her performance in the ballet in 1837, tucked away in an old box of music at the Paris Opéra. This number is now known as The Fanny Elssler pas de deux.

Ashton created what is considered to be among his most masterful choreography for his new version of La fille mal gardée. He resurrected the Pas de ruban for Lise and Colas, in which the lovers perform a charming pas with intricate tricks using a pink satin ribbon. Ashton took this idea to an entirely new level with the Fanny Elssler pas de deux, devising a spectacular Grand adage for Lise, Colas and eight women with eight ribbons. Ashton also included Petipa's original mimed sequence known as When I'm Married, a passage that was performed by all of the great ballerinas of old when they danced the role of Lise. He was taught this passage by Tamara Karsavina, former Ballerina of the St. Petersburg Imperial Theatres and the Original Ballet Russe. She had in turn learned it from her teacher Pavel Gerdt, once the Imperial Ballet's leading male dancer who partnered all of the great ballerinas of the late 19th century and early 20th century in the role of Lise, including Virginia Zucchi.

Robert Helpmann was originally cast in the role of Widow Simone, spending considerable time in rehearsal before the pressure of film work in the US compelled him to stand down.

To inspire Lanchbery to write music for the Clog Dance, Ashton took the composer to a performance of Lancashire clog dancers. This dance is performed in the ballet by Lise's mother, the Widow Simone. Lanchbery decided to use the leitmotiv for the Widow Simone from Hertel's score, the only music by Hertel that Lanchbery's score contains. Ashton fashioned a humorous number from this music for Simone and four ballerinas, at the beginning of which Lise tempts her mother with a pair of clogs, which she cannot resist. She puts them on and whirls into one of Ashton's most celebrated numbers, which also features the dancers using the clogs to perform sur la pointe (on their toes).

Ashton's 1960 version of La fille mal gardée has been staged for many companies throughout the world and has become the more or less "traditional" version, replacing the productions derived from the Petipa/Ivanov/Gorsky versions danced in Russia to the music of Hertel. Among such companies are the Bolshoi Ballet (2002), and American Ballet Theatre (2004). In spite of this, the famous La Fille mal gardée pas de deux, which is taken from the Petipa/Ivanov/Gorsky versions of the ballet, is still performed with regularity as a gala excerpt, and is often used by various young dancer on the ballet competition circuit.

After Ashton's death, the rights to his staging of La fille mal gardée passed to Alexander Grant, the original performer of the role of Alain. In the 1981 version, the role of Alain was performed by Alexander's brother Garry Grant.

In 2007, the Paris Opéra Ballet invited Alexander Grant to supervise a staging of Ashton's version, which premiered at the Palais Garnier on 22 July 2007 with Dorothée Gilbert as Lise, Nicolas Le Riche as Colas, Simon Valastro as Alain, Stéphane Phavorin as the Widow Simone and Gil Isoart as the Piper. In June 2025, after an initiative by Ivan Putrov, the ballet had its first performance in Ukraine, by the National Opera of Ukraine.

As part of a contract between the BBC and the Royal Ballet signed in 1961, La fille mal gardée was one of nine ballets filmed for television, and was broadcast over Christmas 1962 with the original cast.

In 1984, Ashton's production was filmed at Covent Garden, with Lesley Collier as Lise, and Michael Coleman as Colas. A later recording, featuring Marianela Núñez and Carlos Acosta, was made in 2005. Both recordings are available on DVD.

== Synopsis ==
Lise and Colas are in love and want to marry. However, the Widow Simone wants Lise to marry the dimwitted, but extremely rich, Alain, and has arranged (with Alain's father Thomas) for a marriage contract between Lise and Alain. The Widow Simone does her best to keep Lise and Colas apart, but is unsuccessful in her attempts to do so.

At harvest time the Widow Simone and Lise are taken to the field for a picnic lunch by Thomas and Alain. The farm workers join in a ribbon dance around a maypole, and the girls also join in a clog dance with the Widow Simone. There is a thunderstorm and everyone rushes for shelter. Alain is carried away on the wind by his open umbrella.

The Widow Simone and Lise return to their home. The widow wants Lise to sit down at the spinning wheel and spin, but Lise spins while she is up dancing, nearly strangling the widow. After a while, the widow wants Lise to dance, and Lise shows signs of unhappiness, but obliges. The widow takes a tambourine to play in time with Lise's dancing. When the widow is asleep, Lise tries to steal the key from the widow's pocket, to prevent the widow from locking her in, but is unsuccessful. The crops are brought in by the farm workers, and the widow then leaves the house (after locking the door behind her to prevent Lise from leaving the house). Lise thinks about Colas and mimes being the mother of a large number of children. To her embarrassment, Colas suddenly rises from the stacked crops. At the sound of the Widow Simone's returning to the house, Lise and Colas look around desperately for a place where he can hide. Not finding anywhere suitable in the living room, Lise takes Colas to her room, and she returns to the living room just before Widow Simone enters the house. The Widow Simone orders Lise to go to her room and put on her wedding dress for her forthcoming marriage to Alain. The horrified Lise tries to remain where she is, but the Widow Simone pushes Lise into her room and locks the door.

Thomas arrives with his son Alain (who is still clutching his umbrella). They are accompanied by a notary who is to act as witness to the marriage. The farm workers (friends of both Lise and Colas) also arrive. The Widow Simone gives Alain the key to Lise's room. When Alain unlocks the door to Lise's room, Lise appears in her wedding dress, accompanied by Colas. Thomas and Alain take offence, and the enraged Thomas tears up the marriage contract. Thomas, Alain and the notary leave the house in dudgeon. Lise and Colas then beg the Widow Simone to look favourably upon their suit. Love conquers all and the widow relents. Joyfully celebrating the happy outcome for Lise and Colas, everyone leaves, and the house is left quiet and empty, until Alain returns for his umbrella which he had accidentally left behind. So Alain is also happy with the love of his life – his umbrella.

== Premiere cast (1960) ==
- Nadia Nerina as Lise – (the badly guarded daughter)
- David Blair as Colas – (Lise's beloved)
- Stanley Holden as Widow Simone – (Lise's mother, traditionally danced by a man)
- Alexander Grant as Alain – (Lise's rich dimwitted suitor)
- Leslie Edwards as Thomas – (Alain's father)
- Franklin White as Notary
- Laurence Ruffell as Rooster
- Margaret Lyons, Robin Haig, Maureen Maitland, Gloria Bluemel as Hens
- Corps de ballet as Villagers, Harvesters, Grooms, etc.

=== Critical reception ===
Reviews of the premiere production were overwhelmingly positive. The Times concluded its review with "the ballet went with enormous élan and was received with delight." The Financial Times wrote "a triumphant success in every way".

== Recordings ==
In 1962, Lanchbery recorded excerpts of music from his adaptation of Hérold's score, and in 1983 he recorded the complete work, again for Decca Records.

== 2005 (DVD) cast ==
- Marianela Núñez as Lise
- Carlos Acosta as Colas
- Will Tuckett as Widow Simone
- Jonathan Howells as Alain
- David Drew as Thomas
- Alastair Marriott as Notary
- Giacomo Ciriaci as Rooster
- Gemma Bond, Bethany Keating, Iohna Loots and Natasha Oughtred as Hens
- Corps de ballet as Villagers, Harvesters, Grooms, etc.

=== Critical reception ===
The FT gave the 2005 production five stars, as did The Times and The Guardian. The Independent and Metro gave it four stars, whilst The Sunday Express gave only three. Sarah Frater of The Evening Standard noted that "even Carlos Acosta looked tested by Ashton's demanding choreography".

== Other DVD recordings ==
=== The Royal Ballet (1981) ===
- Lesley Collier as Lise
- Michael Coleman as Colas
- Brian Shaw as Widow Simone
- Leslie Edwards as Thomas
- Garry Grant as Alain
- Derek Rencher as the Notary

=== The Australian Ballet (1989) ===
- Fiona Tonkin as Lise
- David McAllister as Colas
- Ray Powell as Widow Simone
- Stephen Morgante as Alain
- Roy Wilson as Farmer Thomas
- Mark Brinkley as Notary

== Score as adapted by John Lanchbery ==
For Ashton's 1960 revival, John Lanchbery utilised Hérold's 1828 music as well as passages from the original Bordeaux score of 1789 as "raw material". The listing below details all of the dances and scenes of Lanchbery's 1960 score. Except where noted, all of the themes are by Hérold in Lanchbery's adaptation.

Act I

- No.1 Introduction (taken by Hérold from the Overture of Martini's opera Le Droit du Seigneur)
- No.2 Dance of the Cock and Hens
- No.3 Lise and the Ribbon – Pas de Ruban (taken by Hérold from the Introduction, Pianissimo from Rossini's opera The Barber of Seville)
- No.4 Colas
- No.4a Colas' Solo
- No.5 Colas and Simone
- No.6 Villagers
- No.7 Simone and Lise
- No.8 Lise and Colas – Pas de Ruban (consisting of themes from Martini's opera Le Droit du Seigneur)
- No.9 Village Girls
- No.10 Thomas and Alain (this number includes the comic solo for Alain, which was composed by Lanchbery)
- No.11 Off to the Harvest (composed by Lanchbery, and consisting of re-stated themes)
- No.12 Colas (re-statement of No.4)
- No.13 Picnic (taken from the original 1789 score – Pas de M. Albert, adapted by Lanchbery). The comic Pas de Trois for Lise, Colas, and Alain was composed by Lanchbery)
- No.14 Flute Dance (taken from the original 1789 score – Pas des Moissonneurs, adapted by Lanchbery)
- No.15 Quarrel (composed by Lanchbery, based on No.14)
- No.16 The Fanny Elssler Pas de deux (themes taken from Donizetti's opera L'elisir d'amore, adapted for the Ballerina Fanny Elssler's 1837 appearance in La Fille mal gardée at the Théâtre de l'Académie Royale de Musique by the theatre's copyist Aimé Leborne. Orchestrated by Lanchbery)
- No.17 Simone (introduction composed by Lanchbery for the following number)
- No.17a Clog Dance (the only music taken by Lanchbery from Peter Ludwig Hertel's 1864 score. The theme from this number served as a leitmotiv for the Widow Simone in Hertel's 1864 score)
- No.18 Maypole Dance (taken from the original 1789 score – Pas de M. Albert, adapted by Lanchbery)
- No.19 Storm and Finale (though rescored by Lanchbery, this is the almost totally un-altered storm music from Rossini's opera La Cenerentola)

Act II

- No.20 Overture
- No.21 Lise and Simone
- No.22 Spinning (taken from the original 1789 score, including re-stated themes, and further adapted by Lanchbery)
- No.23 Tambourine Dance {Aria con variazioni} (taken from the original 1789 score, and further adapted by Lanchbery)
- No.24 Harvesters
- No.25 When I'm Married (taken from the aria Bell'alme generose from Gioacchino Rossini's opera Elisabetta, regina d'Inghilterra. This is the only number from Hérold's 1828 score that Lanchbery did not re-orchestrate). The central 'linking' section of this number is the main theme of the slow movement of Symphony No 85 by Haydn, described by H C Robbins Landon as "variations on the old French folk-song La gentille et jeune Lisette".
- No.26 Simone's Return
- No.27 Thomas, Alain and the Notaries
- No.28 Consternation and Forgiveness
- No.29 Pas de deux (a re-scored/adapted version of No.25)
- No.30 Finale (composed by Lanchbery)

== Recordings of the music ==
Recordings have been released of John Lanchbery's 1960 adaptation of the Ferdinand Hérold score and of excerpts from Hertel's 1864 score.

- La Fille mal gardée – excerpts, John Lanchbery conducting the Orchestra of the Royal Opera House, Covent Garden. These excerpts from Lanchbery's 1960 adaptation of Hérold's 1828 score, recorded in February and March 1962, have regularly been reissued and frequently been praised by reviewers for the exceptional sound quality. The original LP (Decca SXL 2313) even found its way onto the "Superdisc List" maintained by The Absolute Sound.
- Hérold: La fille mal gardée (highlights), Barry Wordsworth conducting the Royal Liverpool Philharmonic Orchestra. This recording of excerpts from Lanchbery's 1960 adaptation of La Fille mal gardée was originally released on LP in 1983 (HMV ASD1077701) and re-released in 1988 on CD (Classics for Pleasure 586 1782).
- Hérold – La Fille mal gardée – complete , John Lanchbery conducting the Orchestra of the Royal Opera House, Covent Garden. This recording was originally released on LP in 1985 and has been reissued on CD (Decca 430,849–2 and Decca Eloquence 442 9048). It contains the complete score of La Fille mal gardée in Lanchbery's adaptation.
