= Vivienne Newport =

English dancer and choreographer

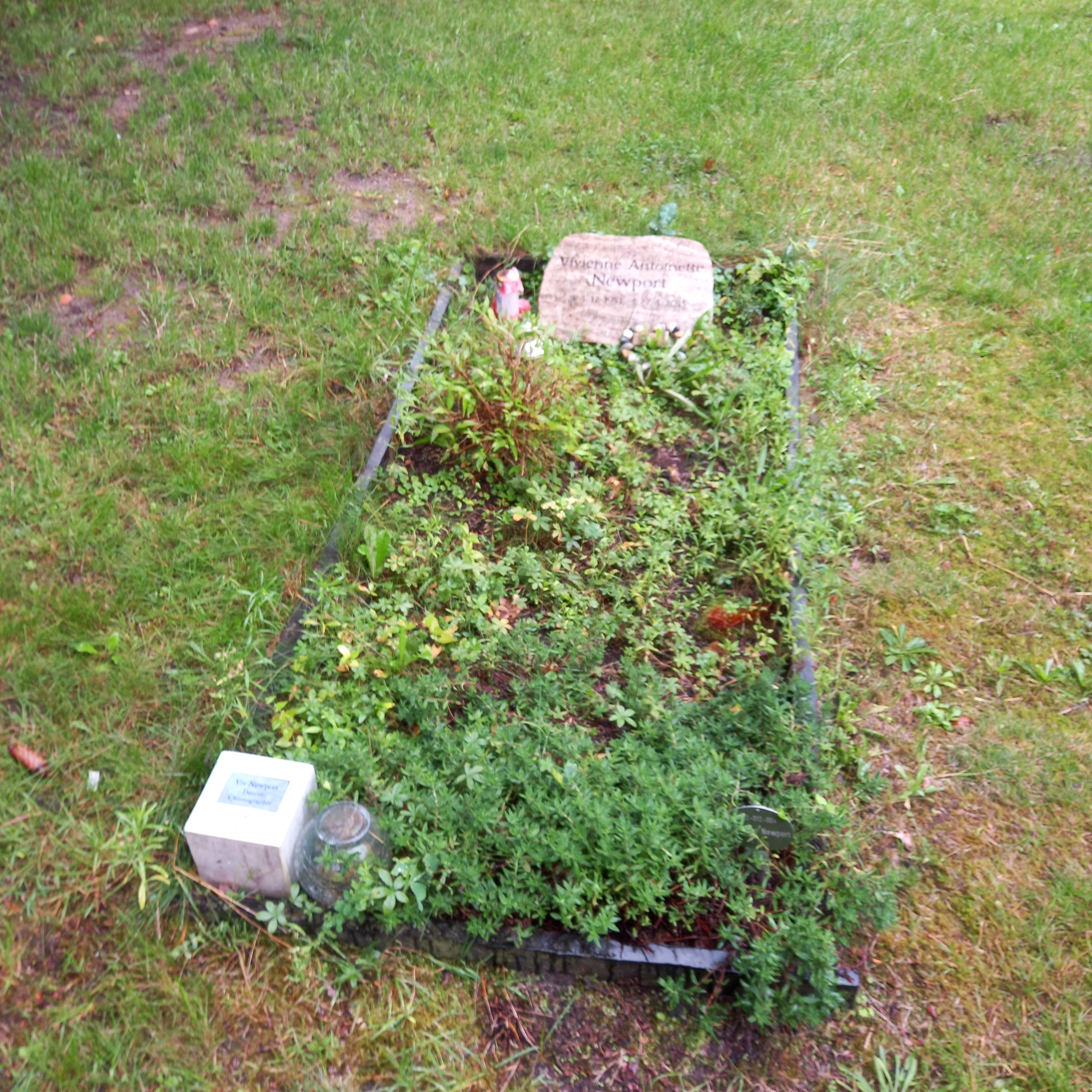
Tomb of Vivienne Newport at Friedrichswerderscher Friedhof in Berlin

Vivienne Newport (4 December 1951 – 27 April 2015) was an English dancer, choreographer and director of the Theater am Turm. She founded the "Vivienne Newport company" in October 1981 in Frankfurt.

== Life ==
Newporta was born in Bristol. After studying dance in London, Newport received her further dance training at the Folkwang University of the Arts in Essen. There, the dancer, choreographer and dance teacher Kurt Jooss had established master classes in 1961, which later became the "Folkwang Ballet". In 1969, Pina Bausch succeeded Kurt Jooss as artistic director. At the beginning of the 1973/74 season, she took over the direction of the ballet of the Wuppertaler Bühnen. In 1973, Newport belonged to the first generation of dancers of the newly founded Tanztheater Wuppertal Pina Bausch alongside Malou Airaudo, Jan Minařík, Dominique Mercy, Tjitske Broersma and Gabriel Sala. The first piece had its premiere on 5 January 1974: Fritz, a dance evening by Pina Bausch with music by Gustav Mahler and Wolfgang Hufschmidt, coupled with "The Green Table" by Kurt Jooss and "Rodeo" by Agnes de Mille.

Newport died in Berlin at the age of 63. Her grave is located at the Friedrichswerderscher Friedhof in Berlin.

== Work ==
=== Dancer in pieces by Pina Bausch ===
- 1973: Fritz
- 1974: Ich bring dich um die Ecke
- 1974: Adagio
- 1975: Orpheus und Eurydike
- 1975: Frühlingsopfer
- 1976: Die sieben Todsünden
- 1977: Blaubart
- 1977: Komm tanz mit mir
- 1977: Renate wandert aus
- 1978: Er nimmt sie an der Hand und führt sie in das Schloß, die anderen folgen
- 1978: Kontakthof
- 1978: Arien
- 1980: 1980
- 1981: Bandoneon

=== Choreographies ===
- 1982: Mist

Premiere Theater am Turm (TAT) Frankfurt on 15 January 1982 with four dancers and one actor, the American Coral Lebleboojian, the French Florence Bonnefont, the Irish Finola Cronin, the Algerian Mourad Beleksir] and the German Lothar Kompenhans.

- 1982: Behind the Barn, an Ox Overeats.

Oeuvre with texts, music and songs by Erik Satie, Sophie Tucker and Louis Armstrong. Premiere Theater am Turm (TAT) Frankfurt on 6 May 1982 with Coral Lebleboojian, Florence Bonnefont and Finola Cronin. On piano Peter Lamb.

- 1982: Trigger

Premiere Theater am Turm (TAT) Frankfurt on 28 October 1982 with Uwe Wenzel, Mourad Beleksir], Finola Cronin, Coral Lebleboojian, Florence Bonnefont and Lothar Kompenhans.

- 1982: Damals (That Time). One-act play by Samuel Beckett.

Premiered as a dance theatre piece as part of the Beckett project of the Theater am Turm (TAT) Frankfurt on 10 December 1982 with Coral Lebleboojian, Finola Cronin, Jürgen Noll and Gerhart Hinze.

- 1983: Persicaire

Premiere Theater am Turm (TAT) Frankfurt on 21 April 1983 with Florence Bonnefont, Finola Cronin, Lothar Kompenhans, Coral Lebleboojian, Jürgen Noll, Uwe Wenzel and Zazie de Paris.

- 1983: Neither the Day nor the Hour

Premiere Theater am Turm (TAT) Frankfurt on 6 October 1983 with Finola Cronin, Florence Bonnefont, Coral Lebleboojian, Jürgen Noll and Uwe Wenzel. Film: Rüdiger Geissler

- 1984: Drowning

Premiere Theater am Turm (TAT) Frankfurt on 6 April 1984 with Finola Cronin, Alexander Dombrowski, Armin Hauser, Coral Lebleboojian, Elfriede Müller, Jürgen Noll, Berna Uythof and Uwe Wenzel. Space: Alain Fressanges. Film: Rüdiger Geissler.

- 1984: Disappearing with the Light

Premiere Theater am Turm (TAT) Frankfurt on 2 November 1984 with Florence Bonnefont, Armin Hauser, Coral Lebleboojian, Elfriede Müller, Jürgen Noll, Berna Uythof and Uwe Wenzel. Film: Rüdiger Geissler.

- 1985: Scheiszegal

Premiere Theater am Turm (TAT) Frankfurt on 10 January 1985 with Florence Bonnefont, Finola Cronin, Berna Uythof, Coral Lebleboojian and Uwe Wenzel. With six songs (six sick songs) devised for the piece, written, composed by Chris Newman. On the piano: Stefan Schädler.

- 1987: Elbestraße 17

Premiere Gallus Theater Frankfurt on 3 March 1987 Solo dance performance by Vivienne Newport.

- 1987: Savannah

Premiere Gallus Theater Frankfurt on 1 October 1987 with Florence Bonnefont, Armin Hauser, Andreas Kühl, Elfriede Müller and Berna Uythof.

- 1988: Beggars Folies and Savannah Beggar`s Follies premiered in Munich's Cafe Giesing (Konstantin Wecker's cafe) in Dec. 1988.Co-producer was the Munich gallery owner Rüdiger Schöttle.Film: Rüdiger Geissler

Gallus Theatre Frankfurt on 11 November 1988 with Florence Bonnefont, Armin Hauser, Elfriede Müller and Berna Uythof. A double evening.

- 1992: Tooth for Tooth

UA Hochregallager der ehemaligen Adlerwerke Frankfurt on 6 November 1992 with Armin Dallapiccola, Ingrid Kerec, Kiri McGuigan and Udo Zickwolf. As part of the Kulturwochen Gallus an event by the Gallus Theater Frankfurt.

- 1995: Hemlock

UA Entkernter Innenhof der ehemaligen Adlerwerke Frankfurt on 24 August 1995 with Toni Abbattista, Ingrid Kerec, Egmont Körner, Patricia Schmid, Namé Vaughn, Uwe Volkert and Yoshiko Waki. The audience looked out of the hollow windows of the third floor into the empty courtyard. An event of the Gallus Theatre Frankfurt.

- 1997: Deep See Fishing

Premiere Neue Tiefgarage unter den Adlerwerken Frankfurt on 28 August 1997 with Toni Abbattista, Armin Dallapiccola, Ingrid Kerec, Hiekyoung Kim, Karin Lechner and Uwe Volkert. An event of the Gallus Theatre Frankfurt.

- 1998: Distance

Premiere Gallus Theater in the Adlerwerke Frankfurt on 9 July 1998 with Armin Dallapiccola, Thomas Langkau, Karin Lechner, Uwe Volkert and Yoshiko Waki.

- 2000: Not/Night/Not

Premiere Gallus Theater Frankfurt on 8 June 2000 with Armin Dallapiccola, Thomas Langkau, Karin Lechner and Uwe Volkert.

- 2000: Cabaret Physique

Premiere Gallus Theater Frankfurt on 30 August 2000 with Florian Eckhardt, Thomas Langkau, Karin Lechner, Sabine Lindlar and Uwe Volkert.

- 2002: n Blick in der Stadt

Premiere Berlin StaatsPOPerette in GRIPS Theater Berlin on 26 December 2002 by Eva Blum and Matthias Witting with Claudia Balko, Falk Berghofer, Eva Blum, Marie Cammin, Claudius Freyer, Christian Giese, Michaela Hanser, Bettina Theil.

- 2003: Totentanz

Motet by Hugo Distler for choir and speaker. Staged for the "Long Night at the Southwest Churchyard in Stahnsdorf" with members of the Company Vivienne Newport. Speakers: Karim Cherif, Peter Hahn, Thomas Langkau, Armin Dallapiccola, Anna Stock, Lisa Weber and Ruth Zschoche. Premiered on 30 August 2003.

- 2005: Sehnsucht will träumen

premièred at the Staatstheater Kassel on 12 March 2005.

- 2005: The hour when we knew nothing of each other. By Peter Handke. Production at the Staatstheater Kassel
