= Daniel Proietto =

Argentine dancer, director and writer (born 1981)

- Born: Ricardo Daniel Proietto; 06/06/1981; Rio Negro, Argentina
- Education: Instituto Superior de Arte del Teatro Colón
- Known for: Contemporary dancer, choreographer, director and writer
- Website: www.danielproietto.com

Daniel Proietto (born April 6, 1981 in Rio Negro, Argentina) is a dancer, choreographer, director, and writer. His works encompass dance, theater, and film and have been featured and supported by various international dance companies.

== Life and career ==
Proietto commenced his dance training at the age of 9 in Buenos Aires under the tutelage of ballet master Wasil Tupin. He later enrolled at the High Institute of the Arts of the Colón Theater, where he received formal education in classical ballet.

At 16, Proietto embarked on his professional journey with the Ballet de Santiago, Chile, and subsequently performed with esteemed companies such as Ballet del Teatro Argentino, Ballet Contemporáneo del Teatro San Martín, and Carte Blanche - the Norwegian National Dance Company.

In 2013, the Norwegian National Opera & Ballet appointed Proietto as a "Guest Artist," marking one of the initial instances of a contemporary dancer holding such a position within a ballet company.

Proietto is a founding member of Alan Lucien Øyen's company Winter Guests and has collaborated on numerous productions, including commissions for Gothenburg Opera, Paris Opera Ballet, and Tanztheater Wuppertal Pina Bausch.

As an independent artist and choreographer, Proietto has toured globally, performing at venues such as New York City Center, BAM, National Theater of Chaillot, Tokyo's Bunkamura and Bunka Kaikan, Barcelona's Teatro Nacional and Mercat de les Flors, Singapore's Esplanade, Monaco's Forum, London's Sadler's Wells, and Coliseum. Additionally, he has participated in international galas and festivals, including Japan's World Ballet Festival, where he collaborated with Aurelie Dupont, artistic director of Paris Opera Ballet.

Proietto's choreographic debut earned him the 1st Prize in the "International Choreographers Competition" in Hannover. Since then, he has created works for renowned institutions such as the Vienna State Ballet, the National Ballet of Cuba, and Ballet Flanders. His creation "RASA," a three-act dance, theater, and musical piece, commemorated the 50th anniversary season of the latter company and received nominations for Best Productions of the year by Dance Europe and the Fedora Van Cleef & Arpels Prize.

His work "Cygne" earned him the Mention of Honor in the Book of the Teatro Alicia Alonso in La Habana. It, alongside his interpretation of Øyen's "Petrushka," is featured in the 3D film "Cathedrals of Culture" produced by Wim Wenders and showcased by NOWNESS.

Russel Maliphant's solo "AfterLight" (2009), created for Proietto, received critical acclaim and was nominated for the "Olivier Award". Proietto's performance in it garnered him the UK Critics Award for "Best Male Dancer" and "Best dancer of the year" by Dance Europe, ranking 1st among 170 international stars.

His solo "Sinnerman" by Alan Lucien Øyen achieved international success and was filmed by fashion photographer Nick Knight, with the work being featured at SHOWStudio. Additionally, Proietto appeared in a film by Knight made for Nicola Formichetti's first Diesel show in Venice.

Proietto has collaborated with eminent contemporary choreographers such as Jiri Kylian, Ohad Naharin, Alexander Ekman, Omar Saravia, Robyn Orlin, and Sidi Larbi Cherkaoui, including staging Cherkaoui's work and premiering his duet "Faun" in the US, earning the ApuliArte Award in Italy. With Cherkaoui, Proietto also created the work "TeZukA" in Tokyo, depicting the life of manga visionary Osamu Tezuka, which was televised by the TV channel WOWOW in Japan.

Since 2011, Proietto has pursued Kabuki training under the guidance of Soke Fujima-ryu, studying under Kanjuro Fujima VIII, a prominent Kabuki choreographer and director. In 2016, Fujima created a piece titled "Natsue" specifically for Proietto, premiering as the second act of Øyen's "Simulacrum," a duet featuring Proietto and Japanese flamenco legend Shoji Kojima.

In 2020, Proietto ventured into filmmaking with "REALNESS," his directorial debut, produced by Nagelhus Schia Productions and M12 Kultur.
