= Toula Limnaios =

Greek choreographer, performer and artistic director

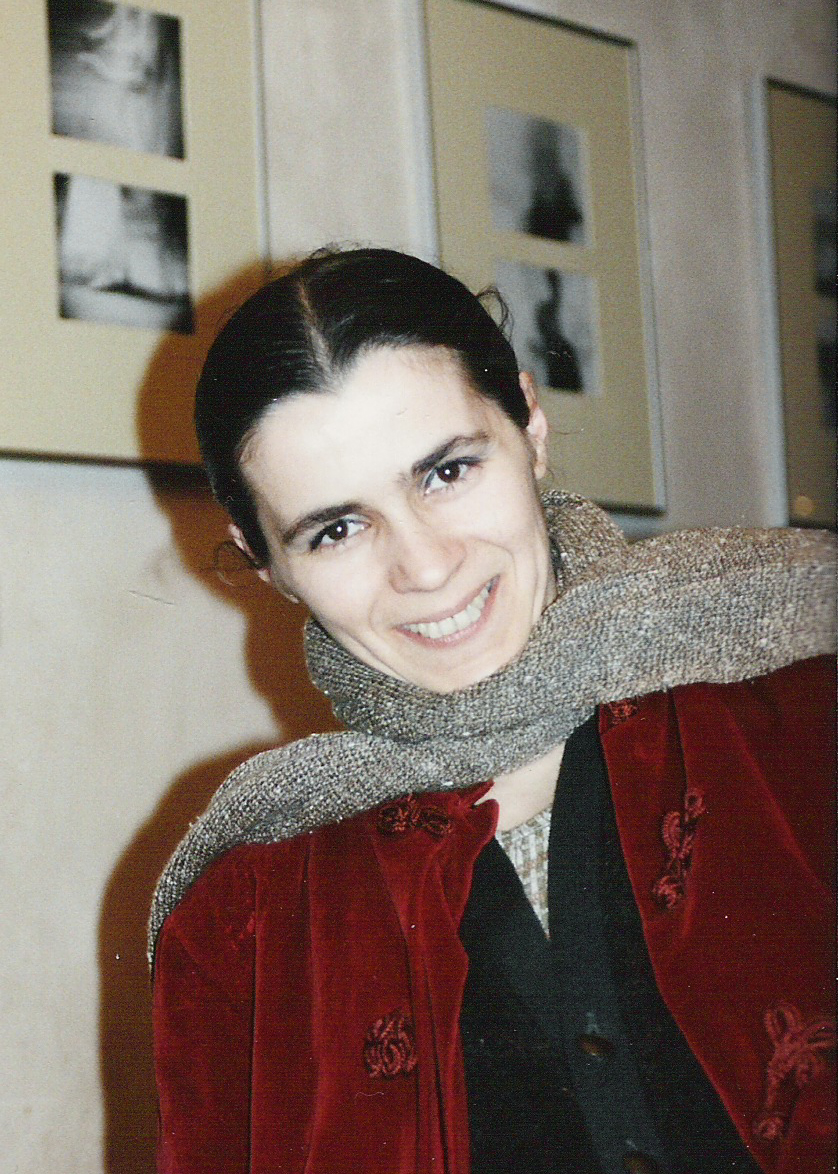
Toula Limnaios

Toula Limnaios (Greek: Toula Limneos, Τούλα Λιμναίος, born 1963 in Athens) is a Greek choreographer, performer and, alongside a composer Ralf R. Ollertz, artistic director of cie. toula limnaios, a dance company based in HALLE TANZBÜHNE BERLIN.

== Biography ==
After completing her studies in classical and modern dance, M. Alexander and Laban technique, music and dance education, she worked as a dancer with Claudio Bernardo and Régine Chopinot, and as an assistant with Pierre Droulers. Limnaios received further education at the Folkwang University of the Arts (at that time: Folkwagen University), where she studied together with Susanne Linke, Malou Airaudo, Jean Cébron, Lutz Förster and Dominique Mercy. She soon became a member of a Folkwang Dance Studio under the artistic direction of Pina Bausch. Limnaios made her name by performing live- improvisations of the Duo Landscapes, she founded together with the musicians Conny Bauer and Peter Kowald. In 1996 she founded cie. toula limaios, a contemporary dance company that brought her choreographic art onto the stages worldwide, including Africa, Belgium, Brazil, Germany, Lithuania, Latvia, Denmark, Ecuador, France, Ireland, Spain, Italy, Austria, Poland, Venezuela etc.

Apart from managing her ensemble, Limnaios works as a guest choreographer at the Theater Osnabrück and the Frankfurt University of Performing Arts (Hochschule für Darstellende Künste Frankfurt/Main). Between 2007 and 2008 she was a guest professor at the Ernst Busch Academy of Dramatic Arts (Hochschule für Schauspielkunst „Ernst Busch“ ) in Berlin.

Toula Limnaios is one of the most eminent figures of German dance scene.
