= Jérôme Bel =

French dancer and choreographer

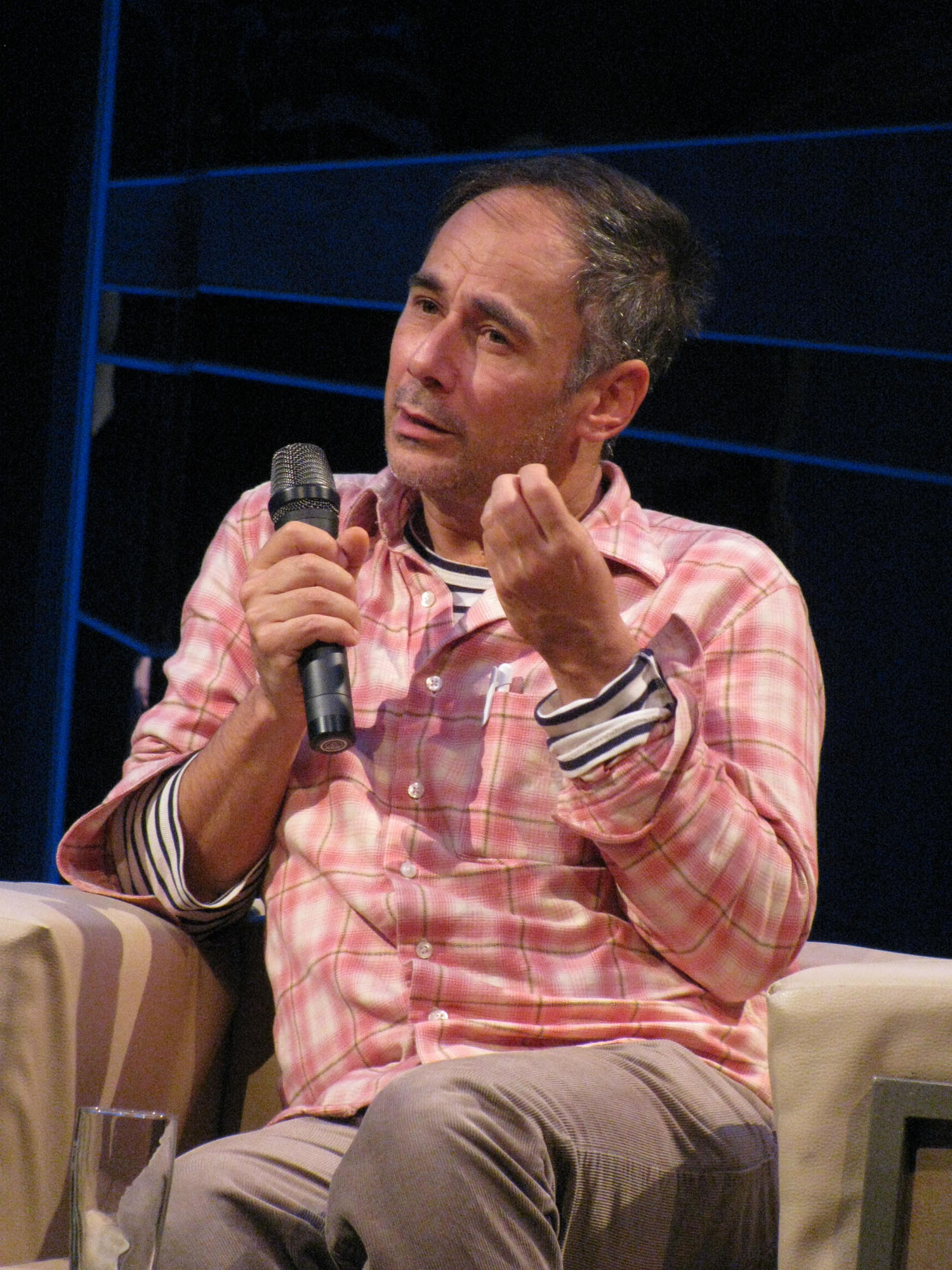
- Jérôme Bel (November 2012)
- Born: October 14, 1964 (age 60); Montpellier, France
- Years active: 1985–present

Jérôme Bel (born 1965) is a French dancer and choreographer.

== Biography ==
Bel discovered contemporary dance at the 1983 Festival d'Avignon, where he saw two important pieces, Nelken by Pina Bausch and Rosas danst Rosas by Anne Teresa De Keersmaeker, which inspired him to study dance. He studied 1984–1985 at the Centre chorégraphique national in Angers. From 1985 to 1991, he danced for a variety of choreographers in France and Italy, including Angelin Preljocaj, Régis Obadia, Daniel Larrieu, and Caterina Sagna. In 1992, he became the assistant to Philippe Decouflé for the ceremonies of the 1992 Winter Olympics in Albertville.

He worked twelve years with Frédéric Seguette. He began choreographing creating provocative and entertaining pieces influenced by performance art and challenging some of the conventions of performance.His first performance name given by the author (1994) is a choreography of objects. His second one, Jérôme Bel (1995) is based on the total nudity of the performers. Shirtology (1997) presents an actor wearing many T-shirts. The show must go on (2001) brings together twenty performers, nineteen pop songs and one DJ.

In 2004, the Paris Opera commissioned from Bel a theatrical documentary about Véronique Doisneau, a dancer in their corps de ballet. In 2005, a residency in Thailand resulted in the piece Pichet Klunchun & Myself, a choreographic dialogue between Bel and traditional Thai dancer Pichet Klunchun. This will be followed by the solo Cédric Andrieux (2009) for Merce Cunningham's eponymous dancer, Isadora Duncan (2019), a piece that portrays this choreographer, Laura Pante (2020) for the eponymous Italian dancer and choreographer, or Xiao Ke (2020) for the eponymous Chinese performer, choreographer and dancer. In 2010, he collaborated with Anne Teresa De Keersmaeker to create 3Abschied. based on Gustav Mahler's Song of the Earth. Disabled Theater (2012) was created for mentally handicapped professional actors from Theater Hora. Dancing as if nobody is watching (2018) and the reading of John Cage's Lecture on Nothing call for a contemplative aesthetic attitude.

Since 2019, for ecological reasons, Bel and his company no longer travel by plane for creations and tours. Thus, Dances for Wu-Kang Chen (2020), a portrait of this Taiwanese dancer, Xiao Ke (2020), a performance created with this Shanghai-based choreographer, and Laura Pante (2020), which presents the career of this dancer living in Italy, were all rehearsed by videoconference, performed in the language of the dancers and toured in the country of their performers.

His work has been shown at Tate Modern, London; the Centre Pompidou, Paris; and MoMA, new York. His work has been included in Performa, New York City, Kunstenfestivaldesarts, Brussels, and Festival d'Avignon, as well as dOCUMENTA 13 (2012) in Kassel. Films of his shows have been presented at biennials of contemporary art in Lyon, Porto Alegre, Tirana and at the Centre Georges-Pompidou in Paris and in Metz, at the Hayward Gallery and the Tate Modern in London, and at the Museum of Modern Art in New York).

== Choreographic works ==
- 1994 : Name given by the author
- 1995 : Jérôme Bel
- 1997 : Shirtology
- 1998 : The last performance
- 2000 : Xavier Le Roy, delegated to choreographer Xavier Le Roy
- 2001: The Show Must Go On
- 2004 : The Show Must Go On 2
- 2004: Véronique Doisneau, solo for Paris Opera dancer Véronique Doisneau
- 2005: Pichet Klunchun and Myself, duet by Bel and Pichet Klunchun
- 2005: Isabel Torres, solo for dancer Isabel Torres
- 2009: Lutz Forster, solo for dancer Lutz Förster
- 2009: Cédric Andrieux, solo for Lyon Opera dancer Cédric Andrieux, formerly a longtime member of Merce Cunningham's company
- 2010: 3Abschied in collaboration with Anne Teresa De Keersmaeker
- 2012: Disabled Theater with the actors of Theater HORA
- 2013 : Cour d'honneur for Festival d'Avignon
- 2015: Gala, premiering at Brussels KunstenFestivaldesArts
- 2016 : Tombe for Paris Opera Ballet
- 2017 : Posé arabesque, temps lié en arrière, marche, marche... for Lyon Opera Ballet
- 2018 : Dancing as if nobody is watching
- 2018 : Lecture on nothing, on the homonimous text by John Cage
- 2019 : Rétrospective
- 2019 : Isadora Duncan
- 2020 : Dances for an actress (Valérie Dréville)
- 2020 : Xiao Ke
- 2020 : Laura Pante
- 2020 : Dances for Wu-Kang Chen
- 2021 : Dances for an actress (Jolente de Keersmaeker)
- 2021 : Jérôme Bel

== Prizes ==
- 2005 : Bessie Award in New York for The Show Must Go On
- 2008 : Princess Margriet Award for cultural diversity, shared with Pichet Klunchun, from the European Cultural Foundation
- 2013 : Prix suisses de danse – Création actuelle de danse for Disabled Theater
- 2021: Taishin Performing Arts Award for Dances for Wu-Kang Chen
