= Shantala =

Shantala is an Indian female given name. Notable people with the name include:

- Shantala Devi (12th century), queen of Vishnuvardhana
- Shantala Shivalingappa (21st century), Indian Kuchipudi dancer

== See also ==
- Shantala Natya Shri Award, an honour of the Government of Karnataka, India, named for Shantala Devi
- Shantala Nagar (or MacIver Town), a city centre area of Bangalore, Karnataka, India
