= Pina (film) =

2011 film

- tanzt, tanzt sonst sind wir verloren (dance, dance otherwise we are lost)
- Directed by: Wim Wenders
- Written by: Wim Wenders
- Produced by: Wim Wenders; Gian-Piero Ringel
- Starring: Pina Bausch
- Cinematography: Hélène Louvart; Jörg Widmer
- Edited by: Toni Froschhammer
- Music by: Thomas Hanreich
- Release date: 13 February 2011 (Berlinale)
- Running time: 106 minutes
- Country: Germany
- Languages: German; English; French; Italian; Portuguese; Russian; Slovenian; Korean; Spanish
- Box office: $14.6 million

Pina is a 2011 German 3D documentary film directed by Wim Wenders, about German dancer and choreographer Pina Bausch. The film premiered at the 61st Berlin International Film Festival, on 13 February 2011.

== Synopsis ==
The film is structured around groups of excerpts from four of the most-noted dance pieces choreographed by Pina Bausch in the Tanztheater ("dance theater") style, of which she was a leading exponent. Bausch and Wenders had agreed upon which works to highlight, and the excerpts were filmed during stage performances of the full pieces by the dancers of Bausch's Tanztheater Wuppertal shortly after her death, Bausch having rehearsed the works with the company in preparation for the filming. Interspersed with the excerpts are solo and duet dances from many of Bausch's other works that are performed by members of Tanztheater Wuppertal in various outdoor locations around the city of Wuppertal, including in and around the iconic Wuppertal Schwebebahn suspension railway. Many of the dancers also tell a brief story about Bausch via voice-over, and there is some archive footage of Bausch talking and dancing.

The first of the four main pieces that is presented in the film is Le sacre du printemps (Frühlingsopfer, or, The Rite of Spring), which was first performed with Bausch's choreography in 1975. In it, the dancers, separated into male and female groups, move about a stage covered by a thick layer of peat as one of the women is chosen to be sacrificed.

The second main piece is Café Müller, which Bausch choreographed in 1978, inspired by a café she often visited as a child. In a simple setting consisting of some tables and chairs and doors, three sleepwalkers, two women in white nightgowns and a man, stumble around, while one man in a suit frantically moves chairs out of their way and another manipulates the actions of the sleepwalking man and one of the women. A third woman rushes back and forth, unsure what to make of the scene.

The third main piece is Kontakthof ("contact court", or, "courtyard of contact"), which was originally staged by Bausch in 1978 with the members of her dance company, in 2000 with senior citizens (as Kontakthof – Mit Damen und Herren ab 65), and in 2008 with teenagers (as Kontakthof – Mit Teenagern ab 14). Wenders filmed Kontakthof with each of the three generations of the cast, and the film cuts between the performers of different ages as they, using the same choreography, preen and interact at a dance in an auditorium.

The last of the main pieces is Vollmond ("full moon"), which premiered in 2006. In it, the dancers move about on a stage that is partially flooded and features a large rock.

The film is bookended by all of the dancers walking single-file while performing a simple bit of choreography related to the passing seasons with their hands. They are in a theater at the beginning of the film, and on top of the otherworldly Haniel slag heap at the end.

== Production ==
On 30 June 2009, during the preparation for the film, Bausch died unexpectedly, so Wenders cancelled the project, but the dancers of Bausch's company, Tanztheater Wuppertal, convinced him to proceed as planned, as a way of memorializing Bausch and some of her choreography.

== Release ==
The film premiered out of competition at the 61st Berlin International Film Festival, on 13 February 2011.

== Reception ==
=== Critical response ===
Critical response to the film was overwhelmingly positive. On review aggregator website Rotten Tomatoes, it has an approval rating of 95% based on 106 reviews, and an average rating of 8.3/10; the site's "critics consensus" reads: "Pina is an immersive, gorgeously shot tribute to the people who express life through movement." On Metacritic, it has a weighted average score of 83 out of 100 based on 32 critics, indicating "universal acclaim".

Roger Ebert gave the film three-and-a-half stars out of four. A. O. Scott of The New York Times was enthusiastic about the film, writing: "Choreography is a notoriously perishable art. Dances often struggle to outlive their creators. And Pina is, above all, an act of preservation, a memorial that is also a defiance of mortality — completely alive in every dimension." Kimberley Jones of The Austin Chronicle praised the "utterly transfixing, exhilarating spectacle of bodies in motion" provided by the film.

=== Accolades ===
In the run-up to the 84th Academy Awards, Pina was nominated for Best Documentary Feature. It was also selected as the German entry for the Best Foreign Language Film category, and was named as one of the nine shortlisted entries for the category on 18 January 2012, but did not gain a nomination. Had it received Oscar nominations in both categories, it would have been the first film ever to do so.

Additionally, the film was nominated for Best Documentary Screenplay at the 64th Writers Guild of America Awards.

== Home media ==
The film was released on DVD and Blu-ray 3D by the Criterion Collection in 2013.

== See also ==
- List of submissions to the 84th Academy Awards for Best Foreign Language Film
- List of German submissions for the Academy Award for Best Foreign Language Film
