= The Complaint of an Empress =

1990 film

The Complaints of an Empress
- Directed by: Pina Bausch
- Written by: Pina Bausch
- Produced by: Herbert Rach
- Starring: Mechthild Großmann; Dominique Mercy
- Cinematography: Detlef Erler; Martin Schäfer
- Edited by: Michael Felber; Nina von Kreisler; Martine Zévort
- Release date: 8 March 1990
- Running time: 106 minutes
- Country: (West) Germany

The Complaint of an Empress (Die Klage der Kaiserin), is a 1990 film directed by Pina Bausch. It is the only film she directed.

== Cast ==
In alphabetical order

- Mariko Aoyama
- Anne Marie Benati
- Bénédicte Billiet
- Rolando Brenes Calvo
- Antonio Carallo
- Finola Cronin
- Dominique Duszynski
- Mechthild Großmann
- Barbara Hampel
- Kyomi Ichida
- Urs Kaufmann
- Ed Kortlandt
- Beatrice Libonati
- Anne Martin
- Dominique Mercy
- Jan Minarik
- Helena Pikon
- Dana Sapiro
- Jean-Laurent Sasportes
- Mark Sieczkarek
- Julie Ann Stanzak
- Mark Alan Wilson
