= Josephine Ann Endicott =

Australian dancer

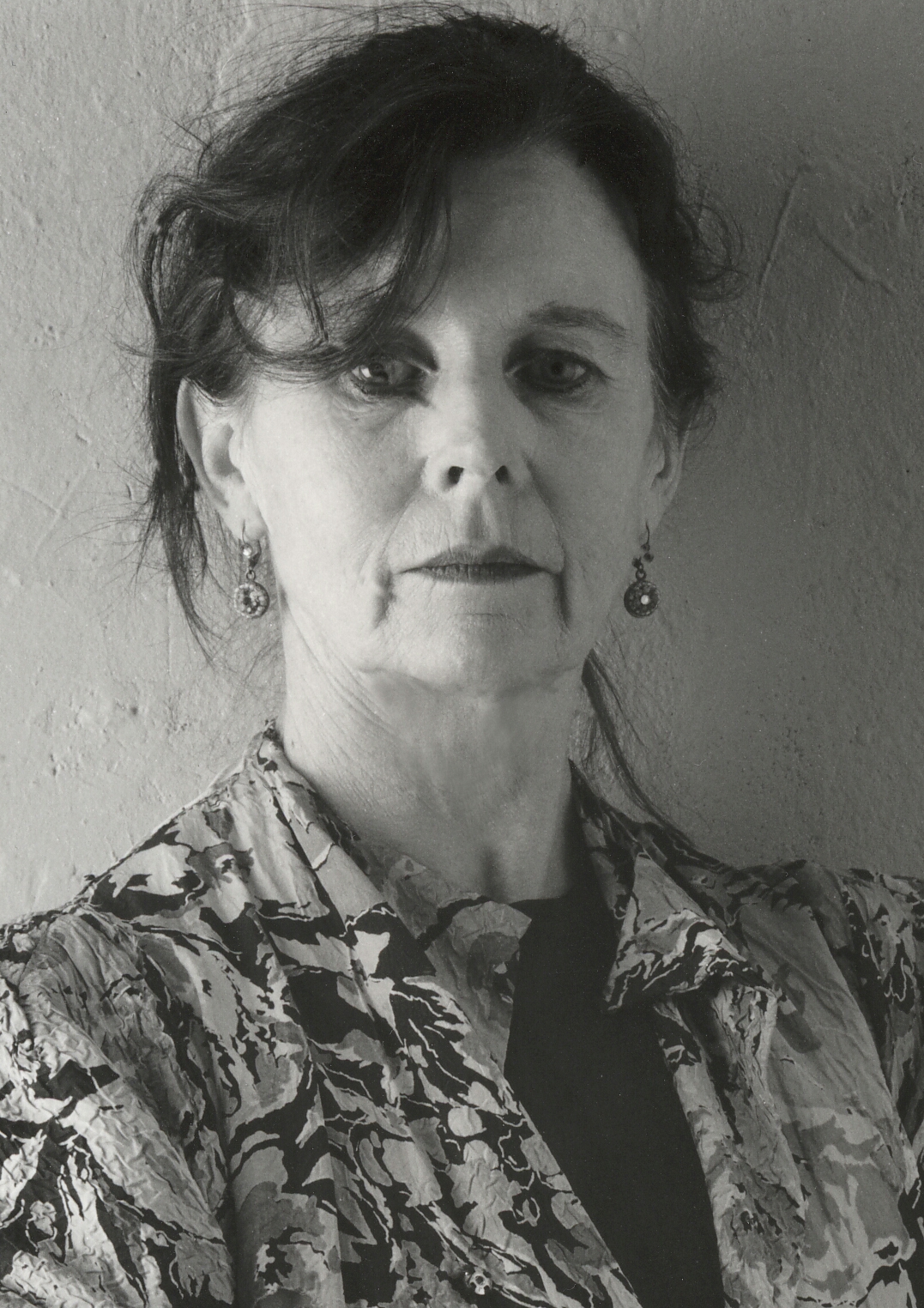
- Born: 1950 (age 74–75)
- Occupation: Dancer

Josephine Ann "Jo Ann" Endicott (born 1950) is an Australian dancer. She danced with Pina Bausch's Tanztheater Wuppertal Pina Bausch dance ensemble in Wuppertal, Germany, from 1973 and 1987, and continued to dance with the company as a guest dancer from 1994.

== Early life and education ==
Josephine Ann Endicott was born in 1950 (Note: Some sources state 1951, but the majority indicate 1950.) in Sydney, Australia. She has two older brothers, and her parents were divorced when she was growing up.

Her mother encouraged her love of dance, and she started taking ballet lessons at the age of seven, and later dropped out of computer training school to attend the Australian Ballet School in Melbourne.

== Career ==
In 1967 she joined The Australian Ballet's corps de ballet. There she met famous dancers who performed with the company, including Margot Fonteyn, Carla Fracci, and Maya Plisetskaya, and worked with choreographers such as Antony Tudor, Frederick Ashton, Paul Taylor, Léonide Massine, and Rudolf Nureyev.

She did not conform, physically or personality-wise, with the then ideal ballerina, so, upon advice of Nureyev, in 1972 she decided to move to London after an incident with her director.

Endicott was a solo dancer before she joined the Pina Bausch's company in 1973 in London when Bausch was putting together a team to form her own company. The two met at Covent Garden in London when Endicott was rehearsing a performance. While working at Bausch's company, she was often cast opposite Australian dancer and choreographer Meryl Tankard. During this time, she collaborated with theatre director Hansgünther Heyme in 1979. In 1987, emotionally exhausted and burnt out, she left Bausch and returned to Australia.

From 1994 onwards, Endicott became a guest dancer of Bausch's Tanztheater Wuppertal. She continued her collaborations with theatre directors Peter Palitzsch (1991) and Wolf Seesemann (1995). From 2007 to 2015 she once again became a full-time employee of the company, often working as a rehearsal director, and also became responsible for restaging some of Bausch's most famous pieces around the world.

In May 2017, Endicott led the reproduction of the "Arias" at Wuppertal. She was the only available member of the original cast of the same production in 1979.

In 2020, she restaged Bausch's The Rite of Spring in École des Sables in Senegal, with an ensemble of dancers from a number of African countries.

== Honours and awards ==
- 2008: Chevalier de l'Ordre des Arts et des Lettres
- 2012: Officier de l'Ordre des Arts et des Lettres
- 2023: Deutscher Tanzpreis with Malou Airaudo, Lutz Förster and Dominique Mercy

== Publications ==
Endicot published two books about her work with Bausch:

- Ich bin eine anständige Frau / A respectable woman (1999)
- Warten auf Pina / Waiting for Pina (2009)
