= Ralf R. Ollertz =

German composer and artistic director

Ralf R. Ollertz (born 1964) is a German composer and, along with Toula Limnaios, an artistic director of Halle Tanzbühne Berlin and cie. toula limnaios, a contemporary dance company they founded together in 1996 in Brussels.

== Biography ==
Ralf. R. Ollertz studied composition, electroacoustic music, piano and conducting in Nürnberg und Düsseldorf. In 1988 he was appointed the music director of Wuppertaler Schauspielhaus. A scholarship brought him to Italy where he studied composition with Salvatore Sciarrino. Afterwards he continued studies at the Folkwang University of the Arts (at that time: Folkwang University) in Essen, from which he graduated in composition under Nikolaus A. Huber and electroacoustic music under Dirk Reith.

Ollertz founded The Ensemble for New Music- go ahead and collaborated intensely with visual artists. He wrote and produced radio dramas in cooperation with the authors Clarence Barlow and Hartmut Geerken, and worked three years as a music director with Claudia Lichtblau. The opera car crash, he composed together with Willy Daum, had its premiere in March 2002 in Staatsoper Hannover, and was resumed in 2006 in Staatsoper Stuttgart. Together with Toula Limnaios, he serves as an artistic director of cie. toula limnaios (since its foundation in 1996) and Halle Tanzbühne Berlin (since its opening in 2003).

Over the past years Ralf R. Ollertz has written not only chamber and orchestra music, but also electroacoustic and theatre music, film scores and radio dramas, many of which brought him international awards and grants. His creative work as a composer and conductor traveled through radio waves, theater stages and silver screens all around Europe, South America, Australia, Japan, Africa and USA.
