= Maybank Kim Eng =

Malaysian bank

- Industry: Financial services
- Headquarters: Kuala Lumpur, Malaysia
- Key people: Chief Executive Officer: Ami Moris
- Website: www.maybank-ke.com

Maybank Kim Eng is a wholly owned subsidiary of Maybank, with operations in 11 markets – Malaysia, Singapore, Hong Kong, Thailand, Indonesia, Philippines, India, Vietnam, Saudi Arabia, Great Britain and the United States of America.

Headquartered in Malaysia, Maybank Kim Eng provides services in corporate finance, debt markets, equity capital markets, derivatives, retail and institutional securities broking and research.

Maybank Kim Eng is known as Maybank Investment Bank in Malaysia, Kim Eng Securities in Hong Kong and India, Maybank ATR Kim Eng in the Philippines and Maybank Kim Eng in Singapore, Thailand, Indonesia, Vietnam, Great Britain and United States of America.

== History ==
Pre Merger with Maybank: 1972–2011

Maybank Kim Eng Group started in 1972 with the founding of Kim Eng Securities Ptd Ltd in Singapore. Its operations expanded over the years, with 1988 and 1989 marking its expansion into Hong Kong and London respectively. A year later, Kim Eng expanded into Indonesia, Malaysia and the United States of America, and entrenched its position in Singapore by listing on the Singapore Exchange thereby becoming the first stock broker in the country to do so. In 1993, Kim Eng started operating in the Philippines and in 1998, opened in Thailand as a fully licensed securities company. Kim Eng's Thailand operations eventually listed on the Stock Exchange of Thailand in 2003. Expansion continued in 2007 as the company entered Vietnam. The 2000s featured several mergers and acquisitions including the acquiring on Yuanta Thailand in 2001 and the merger with fellow brokerage Ong Asia Limited the following year. A Joint Venture with Heritage Trust Group was also entered into in 2002 and a strategic alliance with Mitsubishi UFJ Securities was formed in 2008.

Maybank Investment Bank was incorporated in Malaysia under the name Asian and Euro-American Merchant Bankers Berhad in 1973, although its name was subsequently changed to Aseambankers Malaysia Berhad four years later in 1977. Eventually, in 2003, Aseambankers merged with Mayban Discount Berhad and Mayban Securities Sdn Bhd, and Aseambankers acquired BinaFikir Sdn Bhd in 2008. Eventually, Aseambankers changed its name to become Maybank Investment Bank Berhad in 2009.

Maybank Kim Eng Years: 2011–Present

In 2011, Maybank Berhad, via Maybank Investment Bank Holdings Sdn Bhd, acquired Kim Eng Holdings. Conditional Share Purchase Agreements (CSPAs) for Maybank IB Holdings’ acquisition of 44.6% in Kim Eng Holdings were executed and announced in January 2011. Later that year in August, Kim Eng Holdings became a wholly owned subsidiary of Maybank and delisted from the Singapore Exchange, bringing its stock broking and investment banking operations in the region to Maybank. The new brand name, Maybank Kim Eng, was unveiled in November.

== Invest ASEAN ==
Invest ASEAN is Maybank Kim Eng's annual flagship international investor event. The first Invest ASEAN was held in Singapore on 1 April 2014 and 2 April 2014.

The subsequent Invest ASEAN 2015 Edition saw the event being held in six countries across Southeast Asia to discuss ASEAN opportunities and provide ideas on how to capitalise on them. The series kicked off in Malaysia on 12 February 2015 with over 1,000 economic and trade policy makers, as well as leading drivers of the 10 capital markets, CEOs from over 280 Malaysian and ASEAN-based private and public listed companies, Small and Medium Enterprises (SMEs), and more than 60 institutional fund managers and brokers present. Thereafter, Invest ASEAN continued in Singapore, Vietnam, Thailand, Philippines and Indonesia.

== KataKatha ==
KataKatha is a regional arts and culture initiative by Maybank Kim Eng, supported by Maybank Foundation. This cross-cultural collaboration involving 5 countries – Malaysia, Singapore, Thailand, Indonesia and the Philippines – was launched on 12 November 2015 in Kuala Lumpur, Malaysia, during a four-day event celebrating the Southeast Asia's arts and culture. With "Shared History, Shared Culture, Shared Traditions" as the theme and "Encountering our history, imagining our future" as the main message, the event brought together 10 principal cultural figures and artists from the participating countries in a series of conversations exploring the commonalities of ASEAN.

Principal cultural figures and artists at the event included Goenawan Mohamed, Farish A. Noor, Agnes Arellano, Anocha Suwichakornpong, Geraldine Kang, Kanakan Balintagos, Avianti Armand, Nadiah Bamadhaj, Pichet Klunchun, Lai Chee Kien and Latiff Mohidin.

== Awards ==
- Most Innovative Research House (Global Banking & Finance Review Awards 2015)
- Best Corporate Access ASEAN (Global Banking & Finance Review Awards 2015)
- Best Broker in Southeast Asia (Alpha Southeast Asia Best FI Awards 2014 & 2015)
