= Alan Lucien Øyen =

Norwegian choreographer

- Born: 1978 (age 47–48); Bergen, Norway
- Occupations: Choreographer; Director; Writer

Alan Lucien Øyen (born 1978) is a Norwegian choreographer, writer, and director from Bergen, Norway. He is the founder and artistic director of the company winter guests.

== Early life and education ==
Øyen grew up in Bergen, Norway. Starting at age two, Øyen spent his childhood attending plays. This early exposure to theater heavily influenced his decision to pursue a career in the performing arts. His father, Yngvar Øyen, was a dresser at the Den Nationale Scen, the largest and oldest theater in Bergen, where playwright Henrik Ibsen once served as artistic director.

== Early career ==
After graduating, Øyen joined contemporary dance company, Carte Blanche. He went on to dance for Amanda Miller's Pretty Ugly Dance Company in Cologne, Germany. In 2008 and 2012 he returned to Norway to create commissioned works for Carte Blanche.

== Career ==
=== Winter Guests ===
Øyen founded Winter Guests – an international company performing works in English, often using meta-devices – in 2006. They have produced over a dozen original works and toured in over 15 countries. Since 2009, he has co-written works with British-born actor and director Andrew Wale In 2014, Winter Guests won the Hedda Award for "Best Stage Text", for their 5.5 hour-long Coelacanth, which also received nominations for "Best Production of the Year", "Best Director" (for Øyen), and for "Best Supporting Actress" (for company member, Yvonne Øyen. In 2016, Winter Guests was Artist-in-Residence at Robert Wilson's Watermill Center in Long Island, New York.

=== Commissions and other work ===
Øyen has been an Artist-in-Residence with the Norwegian Opera and Ballet since 2013, where he often creates works.

Known for combining dance, theater and text, Øyen has been commissioned to make many works across Europe. In 2015, he created Timelapse at the Norwegian National Ballet, and, for the Gothenburg Opera in Sweden, If We Shadows Have Offended Further to this, he directed the stage play, Stort og Stygt by Olaug Nillsen at Den Nationale Scene in Norway.

In 2017, Øyen directed Lars Norén's Som Lauvet i Vallombrosa at Det Norske Teatret, and created Kodak for the Gothenburg Opera.

For Tanztheater Wuppertal Pina Bausch, Øyen created Bon Voyage, Bob which premiered in 2018.

== Works ==
=== Winter Guests ===
- America 3, SuperAmateur, Dansens Hus Oslo, 2017.
- Am. ep.2 Psychopatriot, Dansens Hus, Oslo, 2016.
- Simulacrum, CounterCurrent Festival 2017 and The Clarice Smith Centre for Performing Art, MD, USA 2016.
- Jingle Horse, The Norwegian Opera and Ballet, 2015.
- Coelacanth, The Norwegian Opera and Ballet, Bergen International Festival, 2013.
- Lilly and George, Bærum kulturhus, BIT teatergarasjen, Norway 2012.
- Bird in Magic Rain… House of Dance, Norway in 2011 and Kennedy Center in 2013.
- FLAWED, La Comedie de Caen, France, House of Dance, Norway 2011.
- AVENIDA CORRIENTES, Oktoberdans Festival, BIT-teatergarasjen, Norway, 2010.
- AMERICA – Visions of love, BIT-teatergarasjen, Norway, CODA-Oslo – House of dance, Norway, 2009.
- …and Carolyn, Ballettgesellschaft, Wettbeverb, Hannover, Germany, 2008.
- What's not to love? BIT-teatergarasjen, Norway, DeVir CAPA, Portugal, 2007.

=== Commissioned works ===
- Som Lauvet i Vallombrosa, Det Norske Teatret, Norway, 2017.
- Stort og Stygt by Olaug Nillsen, Den Nationale Scene, Norway, 2016.
- KODAK, The Gothenburg Opera, Sweden, 2016.
- Timelapse, The Norwegian National Ballet, 2015.
- If we shadows have offended. The Gothenburg Opera, Sweden, 2015.
- Petrushka, The Norwegian National Ballet, Norway, 2013.
- FICTION, Carte Blanche, Natl. contemporary dance company, Norway, 2012.
- In a tin house when it rains, The Norwegian National Ballet, Norway, 2010.
- Endless, Icelandic dance company, Iceland, 2010.
- Dead to the world, The Norwegian National Ballet, Norway, 2009.
