= Meryl Tankard =

Australian dancer and choreographer (born 1955)

- Born: 1955 (age 70–71); Darwin, Northern Territory, Australia
- Occupations: Dancer, choreographer, filmmaker
- Years active: 1975–present
- Known for: Working with Pina Bausch; Australian Dance Theatre
- Notable work: Dance:Two Feet, Furioso, Chants de Marriage 2 Film: Michelle's Story

Meryl Tankard AO (born 1955) is an Australian dancer, choreographer, and filmmaker. She started her career at the Australian Ballet in Sydney in 1975, and was principal dancer with Pina Bausch and her Tanztheater Wuppertal in Germany between 1978 and 1984. In 1989 formed her own dance company in Canberra, the Meryl Tankard Company. In 1992 she was appointed director of the Australian Dance Theatre in Adelaide, South Australia, leaving in 1999 to become a freelance choreographer. Furioso is considered one of her defining works; other well-known works include Two Feet, Furioso, Songs With Mara, and Chants de Marriage 2. Her life partner is photographer and visual artist Regis Lansac, who does the videography for many of her works.

In 2010 she studied filmmaking at the AFTRS and made several short films. In 2015 she directed and co-produced the documentary film Michelle's Story, about dancer Michelle Ryan, artistic director of Restless Dance Theatre.

== Early life and education ==
Meryl Tankard was born in 1955 in Darwin, Northern Territory, Australia. She was the youngest of three sisters, was born to Clifford Matthew (known as Mick) and Margaret Mary (known as Margot). Mick was a sergeant fitter in the RAAF's Motor Transport section, although had served in the AIF during World War II. The family moved to various bases during her early years. She had her first dance lessons in Melbourne, Victoria, studying ballet for 10 years with Bruce and Bernice Morrow, who included improvisations at the end of each class.

In 1965 the family moved to Penang, Malaysia, and Tankard was influenced by Malaysia's colour and ceremony. She took lessons with a very strict Chinese teacher. After returning to Australia and living near Newcastle, New South Wales, in 1968, her father having been posted to RAAF Base Williamtown, she continued ballet lessons there. In 1971 her father died of a heart attack, and she left high school in that year to study ballet in Sydney, passing all three senior exams set by the British Royal Academy of Dance.

She moved back to Melbourne with her mother in 1973, and entered the Australian Ballet School there. In 1974 she was awarded an Australian Ballet Society scholarship in 1974.

== Career ==
=== Dance and choreography ===
Tankard's professional career began as a dancer with the Australian Ballet at the end of 1975. She also choreographed her first work, Birds behind Bars, for a choreographic workshop program, Dance Horizons, in 1977.

Tankard's early successes as a performer came when she was invited to work in Germany with Pina Bausch and her Tanztheater Wuppertal between 1978 and 1984; Tankard was a principal artist and toured extensively. In 1980 she played the lead role in the movie Quack…Für Donald – mit liebem Gruss. In 1982, after the company toured to Australia for the Adelaide Festival, she co-wrote and performed in Sydney on the Wupper, a short film awarded the Silver Bear for Best Short Film at the 1983 Berlin Film Festival. Bausch often cast Tankard opposite Australian dancer Jo Ann Endicott during this time. Tankard learnt to sing, as Bausch used vocals in her productions, and also developed her comedic talents as well as her creativity.

She then spent several years between Australia and Europe. In Europe, as a freelance choreographer, she had works commissioned in France, the Netherlands, and Germany. She also worked with theatre companies such as the Nimrod and Sydney Theatre Company, as well as with the National Institute of Dramatic Art in Sydney.

She was a guest performer with Bausch's company as well as performing in Lindsay Kemp's company. In Australia in 1984 she made Echo Point, and in 1986 performed in Robyn Archer's television production of The Pack of Women for ABC Television and played co-lead in the ABC TV series Dancing Daze, produced by Jan Chapman and partly directed by Jane Campion.

In 1988 she created and performed solo her full-length Two Feet, which marked a major turning point in the creative collaboration she had established with photographer and visual artist and life partner Regis Lansac,

In 1989 Tankard was asked to become artistic director of a small company in Canberra, which became the Meryl Tankard Company. Works in Canberra included Banshee (1989), VX18504 (1989), Nuti (1990), Kikimora (1990), Court of Flora (1990), Chants de Mariage I and II (1991–1992), and Songs with Mara (1992). VX18504 took its title from her father's army service number, with the dance showing the isolation of war and the differences in how men and women process their emotions. Her company toured internationally to Japan, China, Indonesia, and Italy, as well as touring interstate twice to Tasmania, once to Brisbane, and for festival performances in Perth, Adelaide, and Melbourne. During this time, Tankard also revived Echo Point and Two Feet, collaborated with the theatre director Pierre Bokor on Circo (1991), and created choreography for Opera Australia's Death in Venice (1989).

In 1992 she was made Canberra Citizen of the Year, "for her dedication to the arts community in Canberra and lifting the profile both nationally and internationally". This was shortly before she moved to Adelaide, South Australia to take up the position of director of Australian Dance Theatre (ADT), taking over from Leigh Warren. The ADT at that time had two studios in Gouger Street, and a budget of A$1.25 million. However, she was unhappy to learn that the Australia Council for the Arts had slashed the ADT's budget by 40% after she took up the post, allocating the money instead to Warren's company. All of her dancers bar one joined her in Adelaide, while Warren's dancers did not audition for a place under her direction. At the ADT she reworked some of her earlier pieces as well as creating new pieces. In 1993 she created her first work for ADT, Furioso, which featured aerial choreography and has been considered a defining work. She also created Aurora (1994), Possessed (1995), Rasa (1996; in collaboration with Padma Menon), Seulle (1997), and Inuk (1997) for the ADT. The company toured Europe, Asia, and Australia, performing at Brooklyn Academy of Music in New York City; Het Muziektheater in Amsterdam; Sadler's Wells in London (home of The Royal Ballet); Aoyama Theatre in Tokyo; and the Aarhus Music Theatre in Aarhus, Denmark.

In 1993 she was commissioned by ABC Television to create a seven-minute dance, "Sloth", as part of Seven Deadly Sins, a series of short films by seven contemporary Australian choreographers. During her time in Adelaide she also choreographed The Deep End (1996) for The Australian Ballet a second work for Opera Australia, Orphee et Euridyce, The Blue Angel for Horipro in Tokyo.

Tankard left Adelaide in 1998 or 1999, after a very public disagreement with the ADT board, and again started working as a freelance choreographer. In that year, she made Boléro, based on the famous orchestral piece by Maurice Ravel, for the Lyon Opera Ballet, a work in which only the silhouettes of the dancers were shown. The work was reprised at the Wexner Center for the Arts at Ohio State University in 2002 (where in 1999 her work Furioso had been performed).

Since 2000 Tankard has worked freelance. For the opening ceremony of the Sydney Olympics in 2000, Tankard created Deep Sea Dreaming, to widespread acclaim. In the same year, she choreographed The Beautiful Game for Andrew Lloyd Webber, which played in the West End of London. In 2001, Tiffany & Co. in New York commissioned the work Living Oceans, to coincide with Pearls, an exhibition at the American Museum of Natural History in New York and the Field Museum of Natural History in Chicago. This dance later developed into Pearl, for the Sydney Opera House 30th birthday celebrations.

In 2002 she and Regis Lansac together created Merryland, a work for Nederlands Dance Theater III. In 2003, she created a full-length ballet for The Australian Ballet and the Sydney Opera House, called Wild Swans, with music by composer Elena Kats-Chernin. In 2004 she received a fellowship from the Australia Council to develop further works with Kats-Chernin.

In 2005, Tankard did the choreography for the feature film The Book of Revelation, by Ana Kokkinos. In 2007, she created Kaidan for the Sydney Festival, based on a Japanese folk legend, with Australia's Taikoz drumming ensemble.

In 2008, Tankard created her first work for the Sydney Dance Company, Inuk 2.

Her 2009 work, The Oracle, a re-imagining of Stravinsky's 1913 ballet The Rite of Spring as a solo piece for Australian dancer Paul White, toured internationally to great acclaim.

In 2018, she remounted Furioso for the Royal Ballet of Flanders in Belgium.

In March 2019 she staged a production of her 1988 creation, Two Feet, for the Adelaide Festival, with Natalia Osipova in the lead role. Also for the 2019 festival, she also created Zizanie for Restless Dance Theatre, which received rave reviews. Regis Lansac did the videography.

In 2021, Tankard choreographed Claudel for the Sydney Opera House, presented by Tinderbox Productions. The ballet was written and directed by playwright Wendy Beckett, and is based on the life of sculptor Camille Claudel, and her complex relationship with Auguste Rodin.

In November 2022, as part of ICON, An Extraordinary Event, a tribute to Pina Bausch at WAAPA, Tankard's Chants de Mariage 2 was performed for the first time in Perth, using the original 1991 costumes. Reviewer Rita Clarke wrote: "Tankard's choreography, music and design is stunning, with a visual beauty that leaves you lost for words". In January 2023, she choreographed Kairos for FORM Dance Projects at Carriageworks as part of the Sydney Festival. This work, a world premiere, was composed by Elena Kats-Chernin, who also played piano live, while video design and photography was by Regis Lansac.

=== Filmmaking ===
In 2010, after a year's full-time study, Tankard earned a Graduate Diploma in Directing (Fiction & Non-Fiction) from the Australian Film, Television and Radio School, and directed two short films, Moth and Mad. Moth, a fiction film based on stories of young women incarcerated in reform schools in the 1960s and 1970s, was filmed around the world in film festivals. Mad is a documentary film about the writer and poet Sandy Jeffs, who has schizophrenia. Her poems were made into songs, to music composed by Elena Kat-Chernin. The film won Best Music Award at the 2010 Bondi Short Film Festival, and was screened at WOW Film Festival in Sydney.

In 2015 she directed and co-produced (with Kate Croser) Michelle's Story, 29-minute documentary about dancer Michelle Ryan, artistic director of Restless Dance Theatre, commissioned by ABC Television and Adelaide Film Festival. The film won Adelaide Film Festival Audience Award for Best Documentary, SA Screen Awards for Best Short Film, Best documentary, Best Soundtrack; and the 2016 Australian Dance Award for Most Outstanding Dance film.

In 2019, Tankard directed and produced the hour-long film, Re-creating Two Feet, containing footage from 1995 and 2019 performances in Adelaide, Melbourne, Wellington (New Zealand), and Solingen (Germany). The story is based on Tankard's own experiences as a girl (via a character called Mepsie), as well as those of Olga Spessivtseva, a Russian dancer famous for her portrayal of Giselle, who had a mental breakdown in 1932, becoming a resident of a sanatorium for 23 years. The film was shown at the Mercury Cinema in Adelaide in March 2019, presented by the J. M. Coetzee Centre for Creative Practice in association with Maggie Tonkin.

As of 2024 she is working on a screenplay for a feature film.

== Recognition, honours, and awards ==
Tankard was the subject of a film herself – a 55-minute documentary called The Black Swan, directed by Michelle Mahrer and produced by Don Featherstone, released in 1995.

Wild Swans and The Deep End were filmed and screened on ABC Television, and Tankard was the subject of a documentary on the making of Wild Swans.

Awards and honours received by Tankard and her works include:

- 2019: Officer of the Order of Australia (AO)
- 2016: Recipient of the Jim Bettison & Helen James Award
- 2010: Outstanding Choreography Award at the Australian Dance Awards, for The Oracle
- 2004: Australia Council Creative Fellowship, to develop projects with composer Elena Kats-Chernin
- 2001: Centenary Medal
- 2002: Lifetime Achievement award Australian Dance Awards
- 2000: Helpmann Award for Costume Design for Deep Sea dreaming for Olympic Games Opening Ceremony 2000, jointly with designer Dan Potra
- 2000: Nomination for Laurence Olivier Award for Best Theatre Choreographer, for Beautiful Game
- 1998: Mobil Pegasus Award for Best Production Inuk Summer Festival Hamburg
- 1995: The Age Performing Arts Award (dance) for Best Collaboration for Orpheus and Euridice with Australian Opera
- 1994: Betty Pounder Award for Original Choreography at the Green Room Awards (Victoria) for Nuti
- 1994: Green Room Awards for Dance Direction, Design, Management for Nuti and Kikimora
- 1993: Green Room Award for Female Dancer in leading role Two Feet
- 1993: Sidney Myer Performing Arts Award for Individual Achievement
- 1992: Canberra Citizen of the Year
- 1983: Silver Bear for Best Short Film at the Berlin Film Festival Sydney an der Wupper

== Selected dance works ==
Tankard's works have included:

- 1997: Inuk (Germany)
- 1998: Boléro for the Lyon Opera Ballet
- 2000: Choreography for The Beautiful Game for Andrew Lloyd Webber on London's West End
- 2001: Living Oceans, commissioned by Tiffany & Co. at the American Museum of Natural History in New York
- 2002: Deep Sea Dreaming for the opening ceremony of the Sydney 2000 Olympic Games
- 2002: Ocean Dance to honour the Dalai Lama in tribute concert Sydney Opera House
- 2002: Merryland for Nederlands Dans Theater III
- 2003: Pearl for the 30th birthday celebrations of the Sydney Opera House
- 2003: Wild Swans for the Australian Ballet and the Sydney Opera House, a full-length work based on a Hans Christian Andersen's fairy tale, to a new score by Elena Kats-Chernin
- 2004: @North, for the Berlin State Ballet, and Petrouchka for Netherlands Dance Theatre in The Hague
- 2006: Choreography for Tarzan on Broadway, New York
- 2007: Kaidan for the Sydney Festival and Sydney Opera House with TaikOz
- 2008: Created Inuk 2 for Sydney Dance Company
- 2009: The Oracle
- 2011: Cinderella for Leipzig Ballet with Gewandhaus Orchestra
- 2016: Directed and choreographed Andrew Lloyd Webber's The Beautiful Game at for 3rd year students at WAAPA
- 2018: Performed and created – Meet Meryl and Jo in Bonn, Germany – Pina Bausch Retrospective
- 2018: Choreographed Claudel for Théâtre de l'Athénée, Paris
- 2018: Remounted Furioso for Royal Ballet of Flanders, Antwerp, Belgium
- 2019: Two Feet at the Adelaide Festival, with Natalia Osipova
- 2019: Film Re-creating Two Feet
- 2019: Created Zizanie for Adelaide Festival for Restless Dance Theatre
- 2021: Claudel for the Sydney Opera House
- 2022: Chants de Mariage 2, at WAAPA in Perth
- 2023: Kairos, for FORM Dance Projects at Carriageworks as part of the Sydney Festival
- 2024:For Hedy, creation for Zurich Ballet
- 2025: Kontakthof – Echoes of '78 [director and performer] (for Pina Bausch Foundation and Sadler's Wells

== Personal life ==
Tankard's life partner is photographer and visual artist Regis Lansac.
