= Cie. toula limnaios =

Contemporary dance company

The Cie. toula limnaios is a Berlin-based contemporary dance company founded by the choreographer Toula Limnaios and the composer Ralf R. Ollertz in 1996. The company was originally headquartered in Brussels and later moved to Berlin.

== Portrait ==
In 1996 the choreographer and performer Toula Limaios and the composer Ralf R. Ollertz founded together the cie. toula limnaios in Brussels. After completing artist residency in the Theater L'L in 1997, the company moved its headquarters to Berlin, followed by frequent growth of its ensemble. In 2001 the cie. toula limnaios won the prize of the Festival Meeting Neuer Tanz. Two years later, the company opened Halle Tanzbühne Berlin, its own performance venue that soon became an internationally recognized production house for the dance art. In 2004 its Beckett trilogy, titled atemzug was produced as a dance film for ZDF/arte. Due to its high artistic achievements, the company has been sponsored by Berlin Senate for Culture ever since 2005. The cie. toula limnaios was awarded Outstanding Ensemble in Independent Dance and Theater for the years 2008–2010 by the Fund for Performing Arts (Fonds Darstellende Künste). The company cooperates successfully with the Bregenz Festival by whose commission it staged a dance piece named reading tosca in 2008. From 2009 to 2010 the company collaborated with the Dance Company Jant Bi from Senegal. The repertoire of the company currently includes 33 dance pieces and it is constantly expanding. Since 2005, the cie. toula limnaios has been a German dance Ambassador of the Goethe Institute and the Federal Foreign Office, performing in Africa, Belgium, Brazil, Germany, Lithuania, Latvia, Denmark, Ecuador, France, Ireland, Spain, Italy, Austria, Poland, Venezuela etc. In 2011, the company celebrated its 15th anniversary and in 2012 was honoured with the prestigious Georg Tabori Prize of the Fund for Performing Arts.

== Work structure ==
Instead of gathering around the project on a temporary base, the cie. toula limnaios is an ensemble that follows an imminent need for permanent engagement of its members. Its work structure is characterized by a long-term planning of productions, regular working hours throughout the year and building an annual repertoire in its own theater, all of which are prerequisites for its artistic achievement and continuance. The formal development of the company is marked by two new productions annually. Starting in 2006, it distinguished itself by creating one polyphonic, assembly production and one intimate chamber piece, or an experimental work. Due to the full-time engagement of its dancers, cie. toula limnaios is, alongside Sasha Waltz and Guests, the only Berlin based company that regularly resumes its earlier works.

The cie. toula limnaios is one of the most successful dance companies in Germany, which, thanks to the effective work structure and international co-productions, plays an important role in promotion and development of the dance art.

== Bibliography ==
- Sandra Luzina: Eine verwickelte Affäre. In: Der Tagesspiegel vom 14. Juni 2008.
- Überwältigende Bilder fragmentierter Beziehungen. auf tanznetz.de, 14. Juni 2008.
- Mit sich nicht eins, das kennt man doch. In: die tageszeitung vom 3. August 2008.
- Eva-Maria Nagel: Tatort Tosca. In: Frankfurter Allgemeine Zeitung vom 22. August 2008.
- Karin Schmidt-Feister: Brodelnde Kraft der Zerstörung. In: Neues Deutschland vom 19. November 2009.
- Sylvia Staude: Ein Körper unter den Füßen. In: Frankfurter Rundschau vom 7. Dezember 2009.
- Sandra Luzina: Deutsch-afrikanisches Tanztheater in Berlin. In: Der Tagesspiegel vom 15. Juni 2010.
- Michaela Schlagenwerth: Wie Siamesische Zwillinge. In: Berliner Zeitung vom 19. Juni 2010.
- Sandra Luzina: Jede Frau hat ein dunkles Geheimnis. In: Der Tagesspiegel vom 27. Oktober 2010.
- Dr. Karin Schmidt Feister: (https://web.archive.org/web/20111208031054/http://www.tanznetz.de/kritiken.phtml?page=showthread&aid=199&tid=21764 Wenn das so weitergeht...) In: tanznetz, 27. November 2011.
- Juliane Wieland: (http://www.tanzpresse.de/24+M515d9b01844.html Gespür für Körper) In: tanzpresse, 8. Dezember 2011.
- Volkmar Draeger: (http://www.tanznetz.de/kritiken.phtml?page=showthread&aid=196&tid=20860 Von der Sinnsuche in dieser Welt.), In: tanznetz, 5. August 2011
