= Donya Feuer =

American film director (1934–2011)

- Born: October 31, 1934; Philadelphia, Pennsylvania, U.S.
- Died: November 6, 2011 (aged 77); Stockholm, Sweden
- Known for: Dance and choreography
- Movement: Modern dance

Donya Feuer (31 October 1934 – 6 November 2011) was an American dancer, choreographer and a pioneer of modern dance. She was also a theater director and filmmaker, and a long-time collaborator with director Ingmar Bergman.

== Life and career ==
Feuer was born in Philadelphia, Pennsylvania to Samuel Kasakoff, of Russian-Jewish origin, a chemist and photographer who had immigrated to North Carolina, and Pauline Feuer, an internationally known social worker. Donya studied as a child with Nadia Chilkovsky Nahumck. After moving to New York she studied at the Juilliard School and with Martha Graham and Antony Tudor. After completing her studies, she was apprenticed to the Martha Graham Dance Company and performed in the State Department tour of Asia; in 1957 she danced in Paul Taylor's 7 New Dances. Also in 1957, she founded the Studio for Dance with Paul Sanasardo where she worked with him as a stage partner and collaborator in choreography, and pedagogy. In the Studio for Dance, she also worked with German choreographer Pina Bausch.

In 1963, Feuer relocated to Stockholm, Sweden, for a position as choreographer and later director with the Royal Dramatic Theatre. In 1971 she met Ingmar Bergman and began an association which produced seventeen film, theater and television projects, including The Magic Flute in 1975 and Face to Face in 1976. Other collaborations included productions of Julius Caesar, King Lear and Peer Gynt. Feuer also directed The Dancer, a feature-length documentary released in 1994, and other films including Nijinsky: A Life. She produced theatrical performances in New York City, including Shakespeare's A Winter's Tale in 1995 and Maria Stuart in 2002.

Feuer died in Stockholm of ulcerative colitis.

== Filmography ==
Selected films include: As choreographer:

- 1996 Jerusalem
- 1993 Backanterna (TV movie)
- 1992 Madame de Sade (TV movie)
- 1975 The Magic Flute (TV movie)
- 1968 The Girls
- 1966 Mästerdetektiven Blomkvist på nya äventyr (TV movie)

As director:

- 2000 The Working of Utopia
- 1994 Dansaren (documentary)

As a performer:

- 1992 Tre danser (TV movie as performer)
- 1975 The Magic Flute (TV movie as Woman in Audience)
