= Café Müller =

Dance choreographed by Pina Bausch

- Choreographer: Pina Bausch
- Music: Henry Purcell
- Premiere: 20 May 1978; Opernhaus Wuppertal
- Original ballet company: Tanztheater Wuppertal
- Design: Rolf Borzik
- Created for: Malou Airaudo; Pina Bausch; Meryl Tankard; Rolf Borzik; Dominique Mercy; Jan Minarik
- Website: www.pina-bausch.de/en/plays/9/cafe-muller

Café Müller is a dance choreographed by Pina Bausch set to the music of Henry Purcell. It has been performed regularly since its creation in May 1978, and in May 1985 the dance was performed and filmed at the Opernhaus Wuppertal, and broadcast on German television in December of that year.

== Performance history ==
=== Original production ===
Pina Bausch created and performed Café Müller, a dance set to the music of Henry Purcell, for her dance company Tanztheater Wuppertal, in 1978. It was inspired by and based on her childhood memories of watching her father work at his café in Germany during and immediately following World War II.

The dance is 45 minutes long. The setting is a deserted cafe with scattered tables and chairs, in which the dancers stumble around, eyes closed, bumping into the chairs and each other. Bausch had most of the dancers perform this piece with their eyes closed. The six dancers continually lift, drop, and chase each other.

The performance took place on 20 May 1978 at the Opernhaus Wuppertal.

=== Televised broadcast ===
Café Müller was filmed, with direction by Bausch, and broadcast on German television in December 1985. A DVD of the performance is available.

=== Cast and production ===
Pina Bausch created, directed, and choreographed the work. The dance was set to the music of Henry Purcell's The Fairy-Queen and Dido and Aeneas, and Rolf Borzik designed the sets.

The original cast included:

- Pina Bausch
- Malou Airaudo
- Dominique Mercy
- Jan Minarik
- Nazareth Panadero
- Jean Laurent Sasportes

== Tours and later performances ==
Café Müller has been toured around the world many times, starting with a performance in Nancy, France, in 1980.

Under the direction of Boris Charmatz, Tanztheater Wuppertal presents the dance as one of a triptych under the name Club Amour at the Adelaide Festival in March 2025.

== Summary of movement ==
The piece takes place on a stage strewn with chairs. The chairs are placed randomly, but cover the length of the performance space. There is a door upstage right leading to a revolving door, and doors on either side of the stage.

There are six dancers, three men and three women. Two of the men wear suits, the third wears a loose white shirt tucked into trousers and dances barefoot. Two of the women, one portrayed by Bausch herself, wear long white dresses with bare feet, the other wears a dress, overcoat, and heels.

The dance moves about the stage, dancers shifting in and out of duet. At various moments, one or more dance with eyes closed, rushing across the stage strewn with chairs while the other dancers rush about them moving furniture out of the way.

The movement is often frantic and repetitive, halting with a feeling of exhaustion. There are themes of manipulation and dependence throughout the dance, which are realized through intense repetition as well as trust between dancers that they will keep each other safe on stage in varying states of awareness. The dancers rely on each other to clear their paths as they dance with their eyes shut, a strong example of the trust shared on-stage.
