= Shantala Shivalingappa =

Indian Kuchipudi dancer

Shantala Shivalingappa is an Indian Kuchipudi dancer. Shivalingappa, a "child of the east and west", was born in Madras, India, and raised in Paris. She attended the international Jeannine Manuel School in Paris (then École Active Bilingue Jeannine Manuel) when she was young. Her gurus are Vempati Chinna Satyam and her mother, Savitry Nair, under whom she trained in Bharatha Natyam. She has worked with prestigious artists such as Maurice Béjart, Peter Brook, Bartabas, Ushio Amagatsu and Pina Bausch. Her performances have been praised throughout the world, and she tours extensively, hoping to increase international awareness of the Kuchipudi form. She is known for playing Solveig in Irina Brook's Peer Gynt.
