= Tanztheater Wuppertal Pina Bausch =

German dance company

General information
- Name: Tanztheater Wuppertal Pina Bausch
- Predecessor: Wuppertal Ballet
- Year founded: 1973
- Founder: Pina Bausch
- Location: Wuppertal, Germany
- Principal venue: Opernhaus Wuppertal
- Website: www.pina-bausch.de/en

Artistic staff
- Managing Director: Daniel Siekhaus

Tanztheater Wuppertal Pina Bausch is a dance company based in Wuppertal, Germany. Founded in 1973 by choreographer Pina Bausch, she led the company until her death in 2009. The company is known for Bausch's works of expressionist tanztheater.

The company has a large repertoire of original pieces, and regularly tours throughout the world from its home base of the Opernhaus Wuppertal.

== History ==
In 1973, Bausch was appointed artistic director of the Opernhaus Wuppertal ballet, which she ran as an independent company and renamed Tanztheater Wuppertal.

Bausch's best known works with the Tanztheater include Frühlingsopfer (The Rite of Spring) (1975), for which the stage is completely covered with soil, and Café Müller (1978).

Notable members of the company have included Josephine Ann Endicott and Meryl Tankard, both Australian dancer/choreographers who worked at the Tanztheater and with Bausch over many years. Endicott was a founding member of the company, along with Dominique Mercy, Vivienne Newport, Gabriel Sala, and Malou Airaudo. Jan Minarik, who had been with the ballet since 1970, was one of the few dancers stay with the company when Bausch took it over. Rolf Borzik, Bausch's partner, designed sets and costumes for the company until his death in 1980.

The Tanztheater Wuppertal Pina Bausch made its American debut in Los Angeles as the opening performance of the 1984 Olympic Arts Festival.

In 1999, as part of a re-organization of Wuppertaler Bühnen, Wuppertal's municipal theatre company, the company became fully independent as Tanztheater Wuppertal Pina Bausch. The City of Wuppertal owns 95% of the Tanztheater.

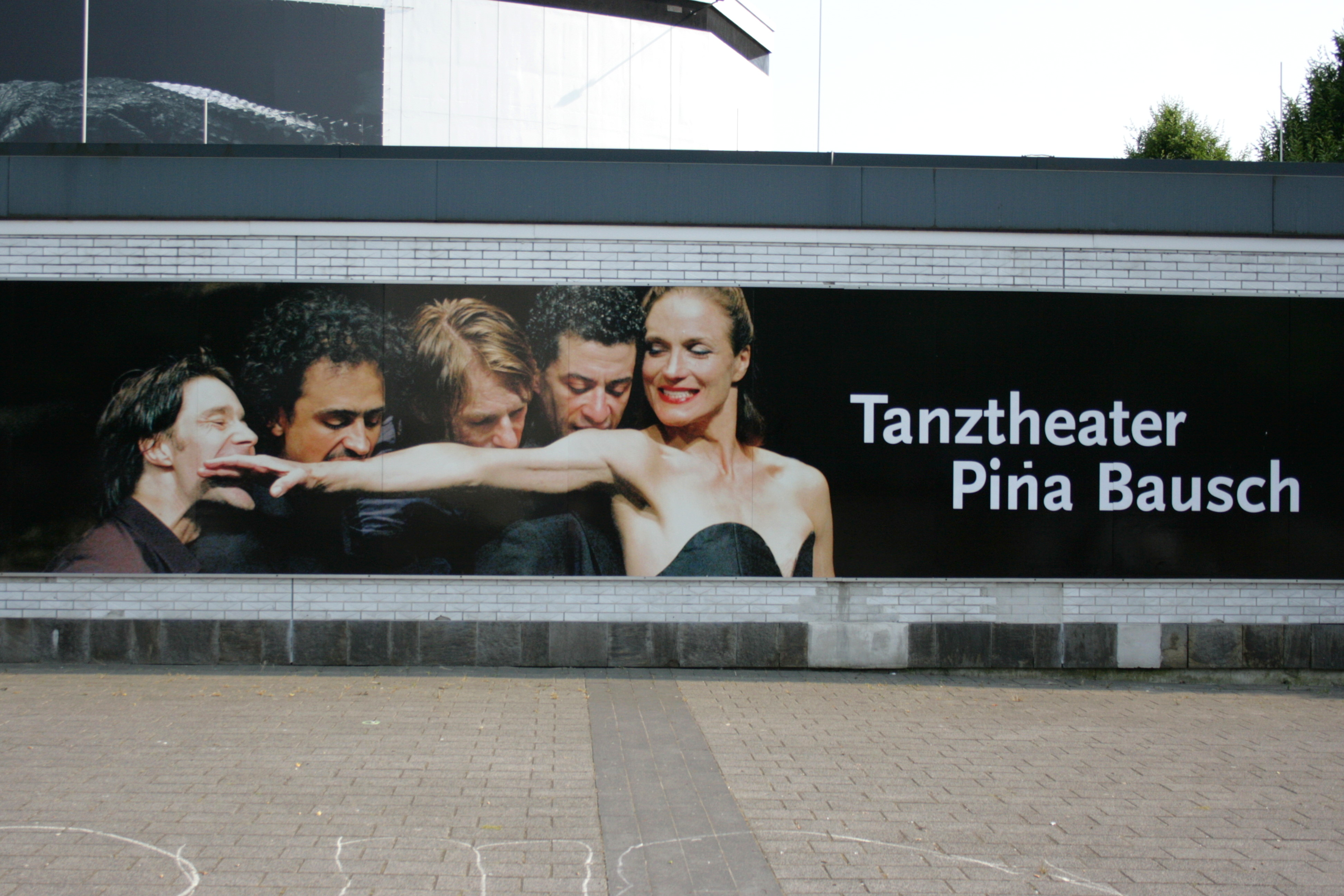
Poster in front of Schauspielhaus Wuppertal, 2008

In 2009, Bausch was collaborating with Wim Wenders on a documentary, Pina, but died suddenly two days before the shoot was to start in June 2009. After consultation with her family, the company, and dancers, the film went ahead. The film features performances by and interviews with Tanztheater dancers. The film premiered at the Berlin Film Festival in 2011.

Since Bausch's death in 2009 there have been five directors of Tanztheater Wuppertal. In 2009, Mercy and Robert Sturm, Bausch's rehearsal director and assistant, took direction of the company. They served as joint directors for four years.

In 2013, Lutz Förster became director. He was a member of the ensemble in 1975 and was also artistic director of the Limón Dance Company in the 1980s. Förster held the position for four years.

In 2017, Adolphe Binder, formerly of the GöteborgsOperans Danskompani, was appointed artistic director of Tanztheater Wuppertal. She commissioned the first new full-length works for the company after Bausch's death, by Dimitris Papaioannou and Alan Lucien Øyen, the first choreographers to create full-length works for the company besides Bausch since 1973. Binder was dismissed in July 2019, and contested her dismissal until January 2020.

In mid-2022, dancer, choreographer, writer, and filmmaker Boris Charmatz assumed the role on an eight-year contract with the company. One of Charmatz's first major new works for the Tanztheater, Liberté Cathédrale, premiered at Mariendom, a church in Neviges, near Wuppertal, in September 2023, the 50th anniversary of the company.

The company continues to perform Bausch's work in new ways, as well as creating and performing new works. Tanztheater Wuppertal performed a sold-out show, The Rite of Spring / common ground[s], at the 2022 Adelaide Festival in Adelaide, Australia, and presented a triptych titled Club Amour in the 2025 festival. Club Amour consisted of the Australian premiere of Café Müller alongside two pieces by Charmatz, Aatt enen tionon (1996), and herses, duo (1997). Aatt enen tionon features music by PJ Harvey and sets dancers separated vertically on three levels of a platform. herses, duo is a duet which Charmatz danced with Johanna-Elisa Lemke.

In February 2025, it was announced that Charmatz would depart from the Tanztheater in August of that year. At they same time, the company stated that the next artistic director would also be founding artistic director of the planned Pina Bausch Zentrum, and the position would remain vacant until after decisions regarding construction are made by the city of Wuppertal, with managing director Daniel Siekhaus leading the company in the interim.

== Awards ==
The company won the 2009 Olivier Award for best new dance production for Café Müller and The Rite of Spring performed at Sadler's Wells.
