= Wuppertaler Bühnen =

Municipal theatre company in North Rhine-Westphalia, Germany

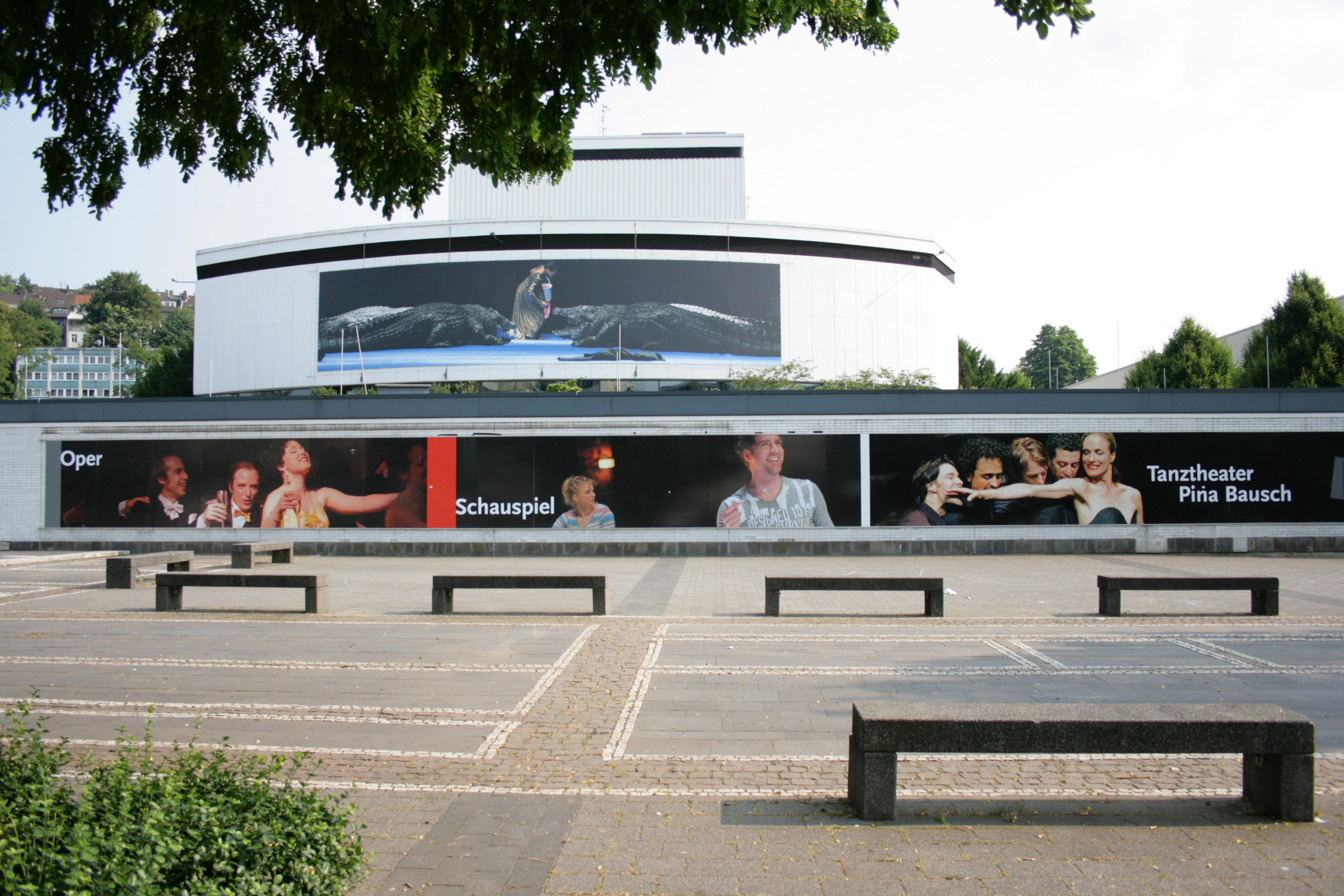
Schauspielhaus Wuppertal, advertising opera, play and dance

Wuppertaler Bühnen is the municipal theatre company in Wuppertal, North Rhine-Westphalia, Germany. It serves opera and plays. The opera house Opernhaus Wuppertal has served from 1956 as a venue for opera and performances of the separate dance company Tanztheater Wuppertal, founded by Pina Bausch. Plays have been performed at different locations, from 1966 to 2013 in the Schauspielhaus Wuppertal.
