= Pichet Klunchun =

Thai dancer and choreographer

Pichet Klunchun is a contemporary Thai dancer and choreographer. Klunchun started studying traditional Thai dance called khon at age sixteen with the renowned master Chaiyot Khummanee. Khon is a traditional Thai dance focused on classical masks. This type of dance developed in the seventeenth century as a hybrid of Hindu military rituals and Thai martial arts. Khon focuses on the Ramakian epic, a version of the Ramayana story telling of Rama, an avatar of the Hindu God Vishnu, and his wife Sita who is abducted by the demon king Ravana. Klunchun studied this art form, eventually receiving a degree in Thai Classical Dance at Chulalongkorn University in Bangkok.

In 2002 Klunchun traveled to the United States with the help of an Asian Cultural Council fellowship. He continued studying dance in America where he was exposed to modern dance. It was this experience with other types of dance that inspired him to push beyond the traditional understanding of khon to revitalize this traditional dance.

When he returned to Bangkok, Klunchun formed a company named Lifework. With this company he incorporated his newfound ideas of modern dance with the traditions of khon he had learned as a young man. In 2004 he collaborated on a piece with the post modernist Jérôme Bel to much critical acclaim. This work led to more international acclaim and paved the way for Klunchun’s company to travel to the United States. Since then they have performed at venues such as New York City’s Fall for Dance, Lincoln Center and Jacob’s Pillow Dance Festival.

In 2008 Klunchun won the European Cultural Foundation's Princess Margriet Award for his piece 'Pichet Klunchun and myself' by and with Pichet Klunchun and Jerome Bel. This award honors artists who push audiences to move beyond fear of cultural difference and the “other”. In 2026 he received the Arts and Culture Prize of the Fukuoka Prize from Japan.
