= Schauspielhaus Wuppertal =

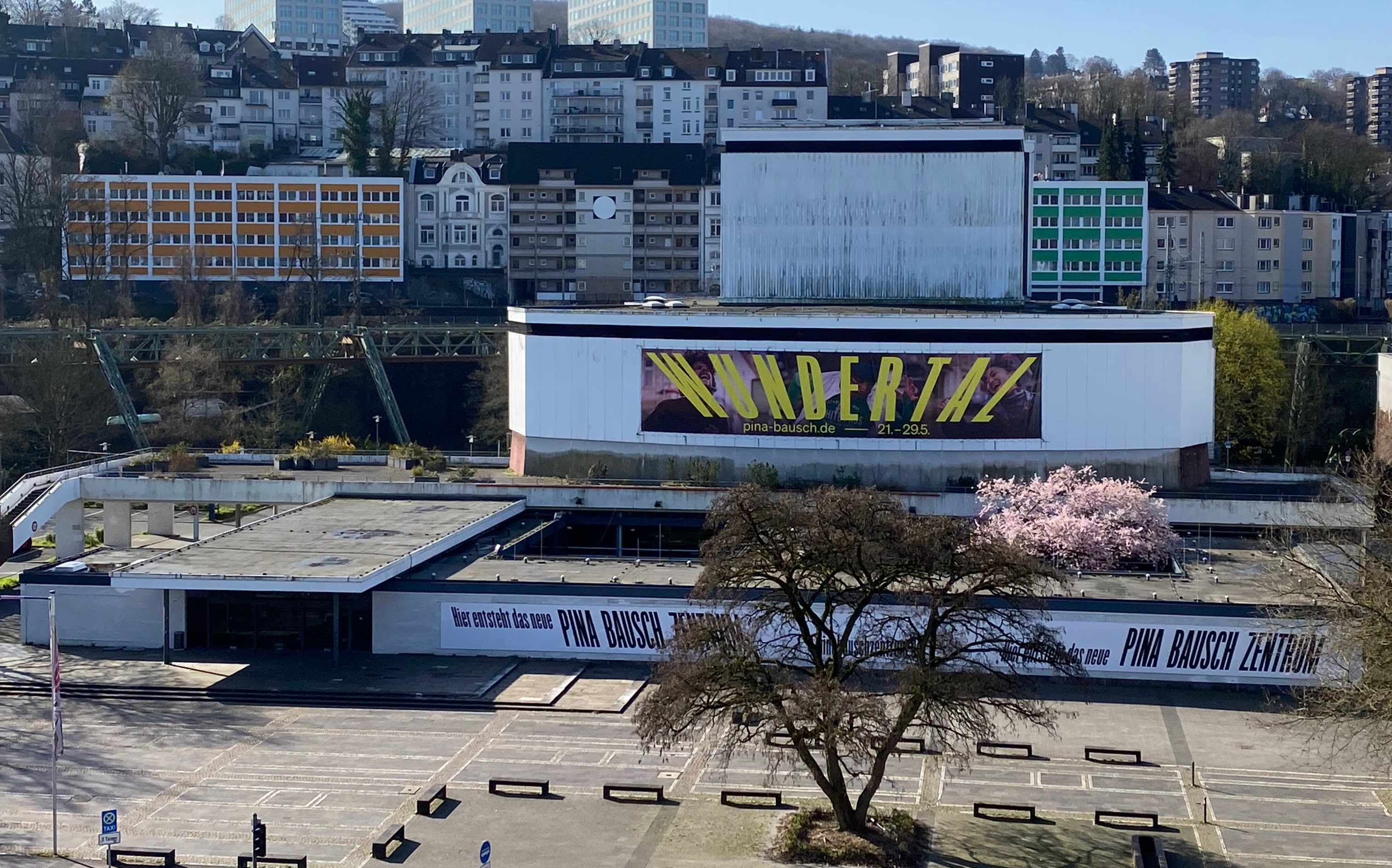
- The theatre in 2023
- Interactive map of the Schauspielhaus Wuppertal area

General information
- Status: closed
- Type: Theatre
- Location: Wuppertal, North Rhine-Westphalia, Germany, Bundesallee
- Coordinates: 51°16′02″N 7°11′37″E
- Construction started: 1964
- Opened: 1966

Design and construction
- Architect: Gerhard Graubner

Other information
- Seating capacity: 745 / 135

Website
- wuppertaler-buehnen.de

Schauspielhaus Wuppertal was a Schauspielhaus, a theatre for plays, in Wuppertal, North Rhine-Westphalia, Germany. The 745-seat municipal theatre is on Bundesallee next to the river Wupper in Elberfeld. Designed by Gerhard Graubner, it was opened in 1966, run from 2001 by 'Wuppertaler Bühnen' (Wuppertal Stages, municipal theatres in Wuppertal). Starting in 2009, the house operated only 135 seats, and it was closed on 30 June 2013.

== History ==
All theatres in Wuppertal were damaged in World War II. Performances were held in various locations. After the opera house was restored in 1956, the town decided in 1962 to build a new house dedicated to plays. In 1963 Gerhard Graubner was commissioned to build a house with 750 seats. Construction started in 1964.

The Schauspielhaus was opened on 24 and 25 September 1966, playing Gotthold Ephraim Lessing's Nathan der Weise and Else Lasker-Schüler's Die Wupper (de). Heinrich Böll delivered a speech for the inauguration in the presence of president Heinrich Lübke, "Die Freiheit der Kunst" (Freedom in the art).

Since June 2000, the building has been protected as an architectural monument. During construction at the opera house from 2006 to 2009, it showed also opera and productions of the Tanztheater Wuppertal Pina Bausch created by Pina Bausch. In 2009 the house needed major repair, forcing it to be closed. As a renovation could not be funded, a 135-seat studio theatre, the 'Kleines Schauspielhaus' operated in the foyer from the 2009/2010 season. The premiere was on 25 September 2009 Eine Billion Dollar. Protests by citizens achieved a delay for the complete closing until 2013. The last performance was on 30 June 2013. Cleanup has to be finished by 31 July 2013. A further use as an international archive for the dance theatre or an extension of the Von der Heydt Museum is considered, but depends on major renovation that likely also can not be funded.

== Architecture ==
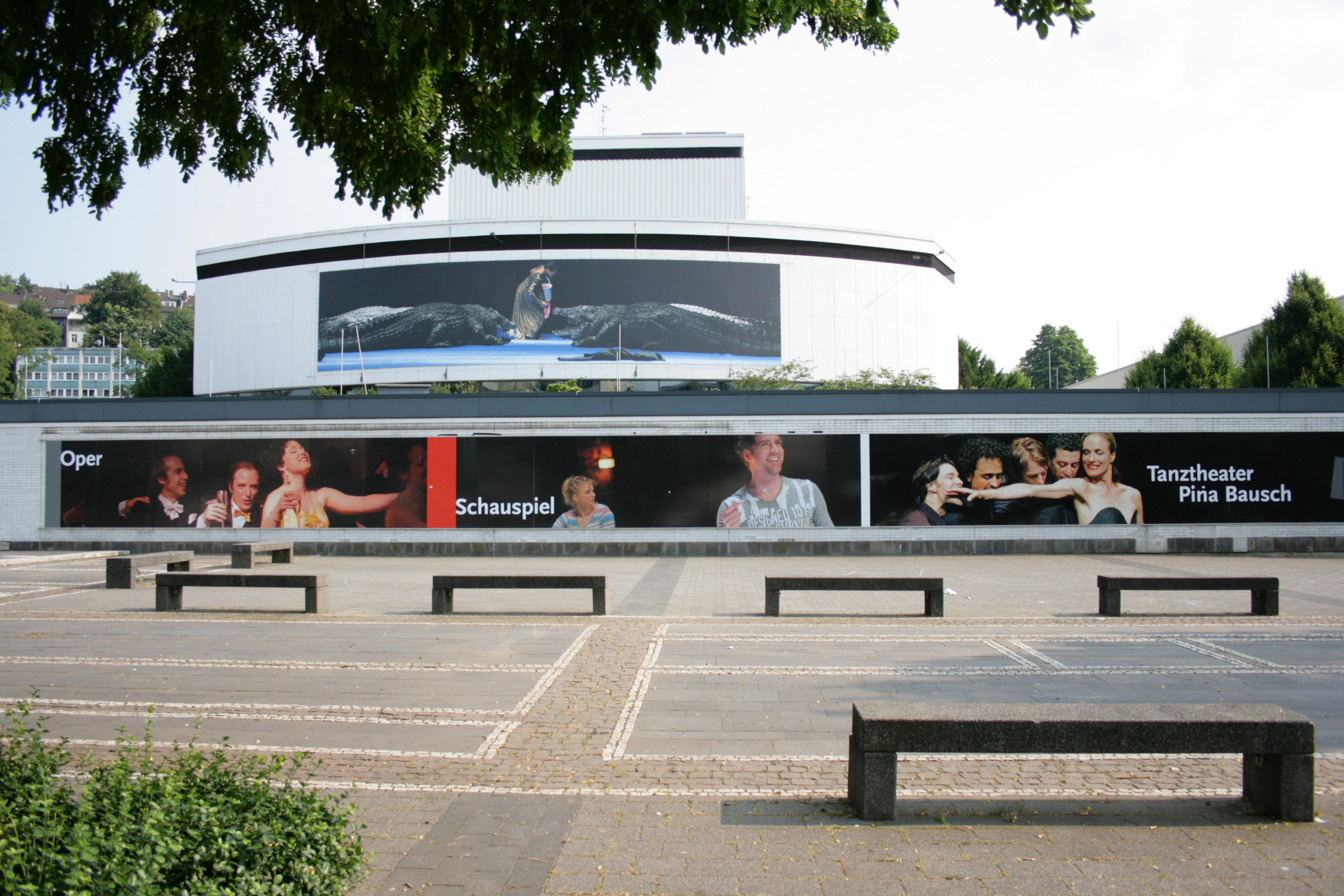
Schauspielhaus, advertising opera, play and dance

The house is structured in three elements, following its functions. The building is symmetrical in layers of different height. White walls are accented by a "Fensterband", a horizontal arrangement of narrow windows.

The broad entrance hall is on the ground floor, also the foyer including two atriums with Japanese gardens. The great hall is above and beyond it, its outer walls are slightly curved. The seats are arranged in 20 rows in the style of an amphitheatre. The stage house is a high cube, situated next to the river.

== Literature ==
- Informationen Schauspielhaus der Stadt Wuppertal erbaut 1964–1966, Hochbauamt of Wuppertal
