= Dominique Mercy =

French dancer (born 1950)

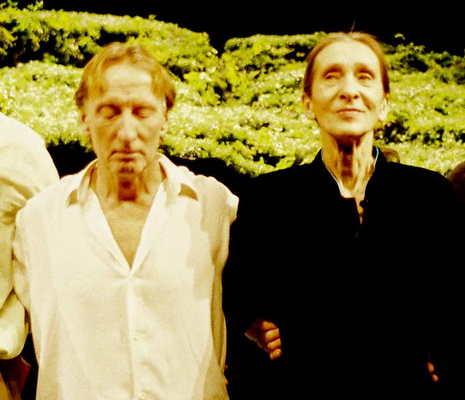
- Dominique Mercy, left, with Pina Bausch, Paris in 2009
- Born: 1950 (age 75–76); Mauzac, France
- Occupations: Dancer, choreographer
- Career
- Former groups: Tanztheater Wuppertal Pina Bausch

Dominique Mercy (born 1950) is a French contemporary dancer and choreographer. He was a long-time member of the Tanztheater Wuppertal company of Pina Bausch, and was co-artistic director of the company following Bausch's death in 2009 to 2013.

== Biography ==
Mercy was born in 1950 in Mauzac, France. He started dancing when he was six years old and received his education in classical dance.

In 1965, he began dancing with the Grand Théâtre de Bordeaux, and in 1968 he joined the Ballet Théâtre Contemporain.

At the 1972 Saratoga Summer Festival, Mercy met Pina Bausch who was working with the Sanasardo Dance Company. Bausch invited him to join her new company in Germany, Tanztheater Wuppertal, in 1973. Though he left the company twice in, in 1975 and 1978, founding the company Le Main in Paris with Malou Airaudo, Héléna Pikon, Jacques Patarozzi, and Dana Sapiro in 1975, and to work with Carolyn Carlson, he returned and was a member of the Tanztheater until 2018.

Mercy performed lead roles and was a soloist in many of Bausch's works, including Orfeo ed Euridice and Iphigénie en Tauride

Together with Bausch's assistant Robert Sturm, he was elected unanimously by the ensemble in place of Pina Bausch in October 2009, serving for four years.

Mercy taught at Folkwang University of the Arts from 1988 to 2009.

== Personal life ==
Mercy had a daughter with Airaudo, Thusnelda Mercy (born 1977), who is also a dancer with Tanztheater Wuppertal.

== Awards and Honors ==
- 2001: Chevalier des Ordre des Arts et des Lettres
- 2002: Bessie Award for his performance in Masurca Fogo and sustained achievement.
- 2013: Legion of Honour
- 2022: Officier des Ordre des Arts et des Lettres
- 2023: Deutscher Tanzpreis with Malou Airaudo, Josephine Ann Endicott, and Lutz Förster

== Major choreographies ==
=== As interpreter ===
- 1974: Iphigénie en Tauride
- 1975: Orfeo ed Euridice
- 1978: Café Müller
- 1980: Bandoneon
- 1983: Nelken - Carnations
- 1989: Palermo, Palermo
- 1995: Danzón
- 1997: Der Fensterputzer - The Window Cleaner
- 1998: Masurca Fogo
- 1999: Petit psaume du matin (Little morning psalm) written for Dominique Mercy by Josef Nadj.

=== As choreographer ===
- Pina Bausch assistant for a major part of the creations since 1974.
- 2000: Ça ira mieux demain written for Guesch Patti

== Documentary film ==
- Dominique Mercy dances Pina Bausch by Régis Obadia, France, 2003, 52 min., producer
