= Nelken =

Nelken is a German-language surname. Notable people with this surname include:

- Carmen Eva Nelken Mansberger (1898–1966), a.k.a. Magda Donato, Spanish writer, journalist, playwright, and actress
- David Nelken, British law professor
- Hank Nelken, American screenwriter
- Margarita Nelken (1894–1968), Spanish feminist and writer
- Shane Nelken, Canadian singer-songwriter
