= Paul Sanasardo =

American dancer, choreographer and dance teacher (1928–2026)

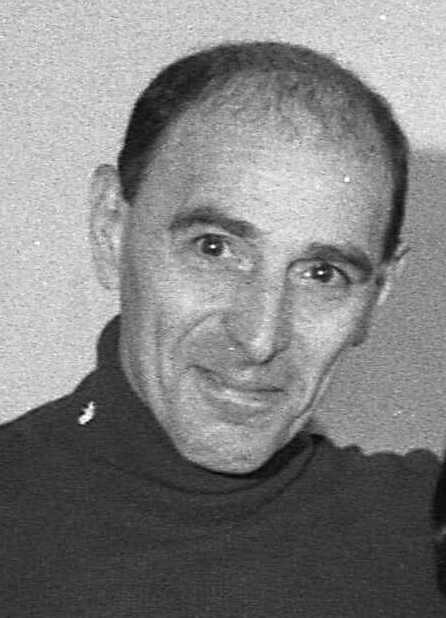
- Sanasardo in 1980
- Born: Paolo Savior Giuseppe Vincenzo Franco di Sanasardo i Bonadona; September 15, 1928; Chicago, Illinois, U.S.
- Died: July 23, 2026 (aged 97); Park Ridge, Illinois, U.S.
- Occupations: Dancer, choreographer

Paul Savior Sanasardo (September 15, 1928 – July 23, 2026) was an American dancer, choreographer and dance teacher of Italian descent.

== Life and career ==
Paolo Savior Giuseppe Vincenzo Franco di Sanasardo i Bonadona was born in Chicago, Illinois, on September 15, 1928, to a Sicilian family from Palermo, Italy. He attended the School of the Art Institute of Chicago, studied dance with Antony Tudor and Martha Graham, and made his debut in 1952 with the Erika Thimey Dance Theater. In 1955 he performed with Anna Sokolow and in 1957 and 1964 with Pearl Lang. He also danced with New York City Opera and in musicals on Broadway.

He founded the Paul Sanasardo-Donya Feuer Dance Company in 1957 and the Studio for Dance school (later Modern Dance Artists Inc.) in 1958. He served as the artistic director of the Batsheva Dance Company from 1977 to 1981. From 1981 till disbanding his company in 1986, he ran a second story dance studio on 21st street. After disbanding his company he continued choreographing and teaching. His works continue to be performed by several companies, including Alvin Ailey American Dance Theater.

Sanasardo lived in Arlington Heights, Illinois. He died in Park Ridge, Illinois, on July 23, 2026, at the age of 97.

== Works ==
Selected works include:

- In View of God (1959)
- Laughter after All (1960)
- Pictures in Our House (1961)
- Metallics (1963)
- Fatal Birds (1966)
- Excursions (1966)
- Pain (1969)
- Footnotes (1970)
- Cyclometry (1971)
- The Path (1972)
- Shadows (1973)
- The Amazing Graces (1974)
- A Consort for Dancers (1975)
- Abandoned Prayer (1976)
- Children in the Mist (1985)
- The Seven Last Words (music by Kancheli, 1994)
- Sleepless Nights in the City (2009)
- Bells
