= Carte Blanche (Norwegian dance company) =

Norwegian national dance company

Coordinates: 60°23′41.33″N 5°18′40.77″E

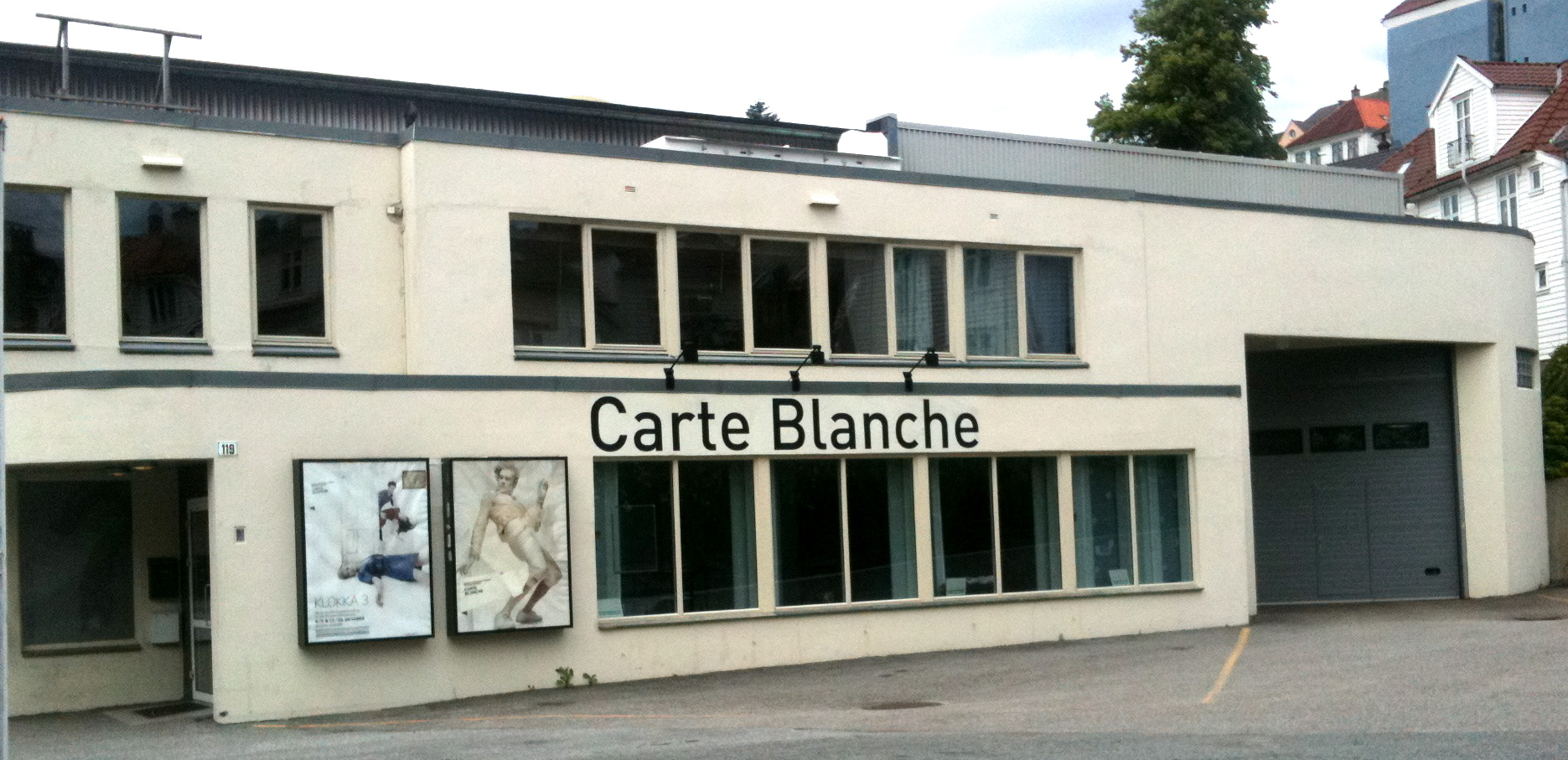
Studio Bergen, the home of Carte Blanche in Bergen

Carte Blanche is the Norwegian national company of contemporary dance, based in Bergen in western Norway. Since August 2018 the artistic and general director of the company has been Annabelle Bonnéry from France. Choreographers who have recently worked with Carte Blanche include Ina Christel Johannessen, Alan Lucien Øyen, Sharon Eyal (from Batsheva Dance Company), and Rui Horta.

The company produces a minimum of three new choreographic works a year and performs an average of four to six productions every year. While the home base of the company is in Bergen, the company spends much time touring elsewhere in Norway (e.g. Oslo Opera House), but also abroad. Some recent international performances include:

- "Klokka 3 om ettermiddagen" (3 o'clock in the afternoon) by Ina Christel Johannessen at the "Ice hot – Nordic dance platform" festival in Stockholm, Sweden,
- "Corps de Walk" by Sharon Eyal in Turku, Finland, as a part of city's activities as a European Capital of Culture in 2011
- "Ambra" by Ina Christel Johannessen, a co-production between Carte Blanche and Iceland Dance Company staged at the Reykjavík Arts Festival and the Bergen International Festival. Johannessen received the 2008 Norwegian Critics Price for her choreography of Ambra.
- "Killer Pig" and "Love" by Sharon Eyal at the Jacob's Pillow Dance Festival, Becket, MA, USA

The company has an international crew of about 15 dancers. During the audition in January 2011, 170 candidates representing 28 nationalities were competing for two vacancies.

The history of Carte Blanche in Bergen starts in 1989, first as a regional dance theatre. After a turbulent start including a bankruptcy, the company has gained a solid position, and is currently the national contemporary dance theatre of Norway. Carte Blanche is owned and funded by the Norwegian state (70%), the County of Hordaland (15%) and the City of Bergen (15%).
