= Pina Bausch =

German dancer and choreographer (1940–2009)

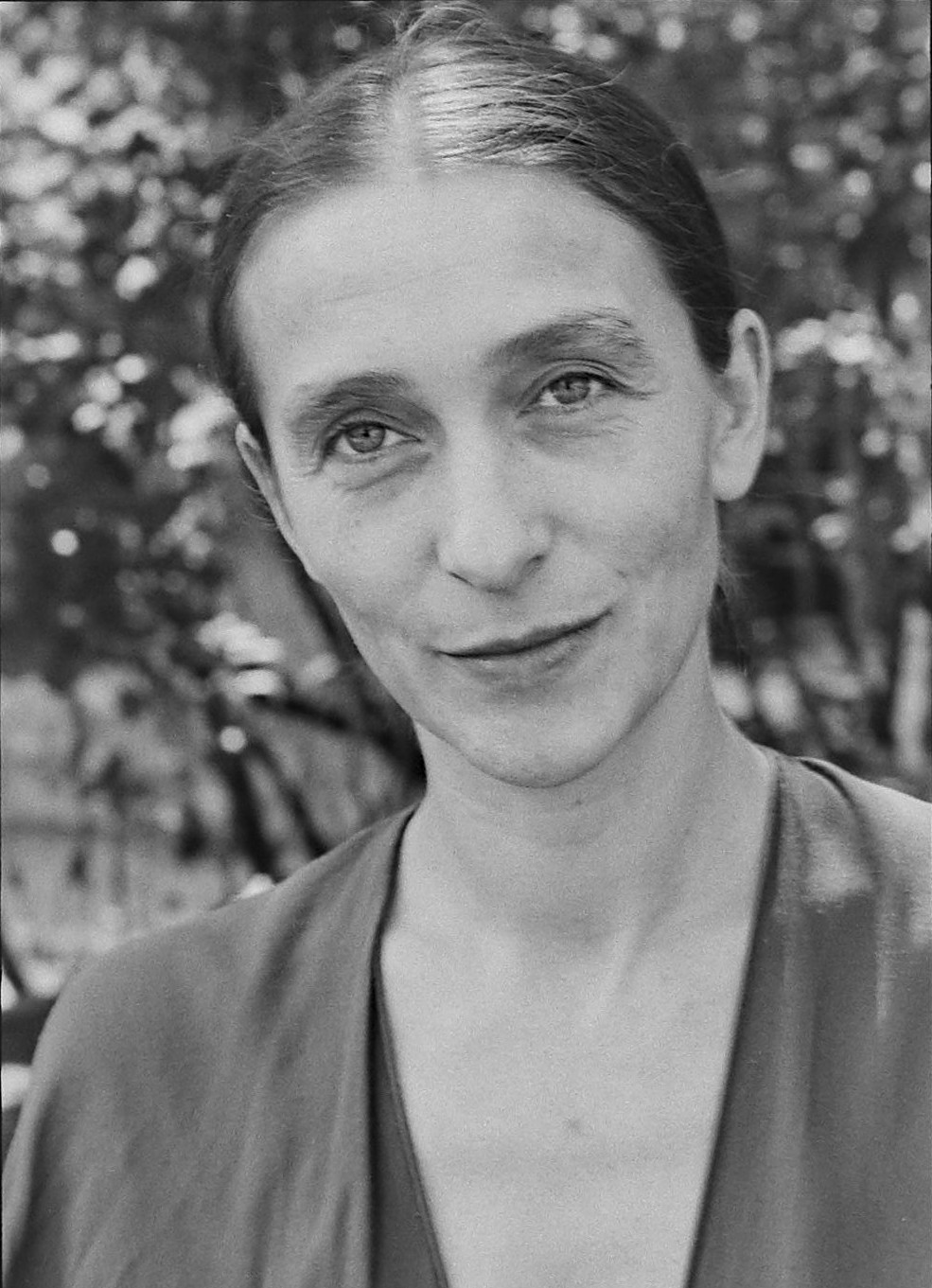
- Bausch at the festival d'Avignon in 1981
- Born: Philippine Bausch; 27 July 1940; Solingen, Germany
- Died: 30 June 2009 (aged 68); Wuppertal, North Rhine-Westphalia, Germany
- Other name: Philippine Bausch
- Education: Folkwangschule; Juilliard School
- Occupations: Modern dance choreographer, folk dance choreographer, dancer
- Organizations: Tanztheater Wuppertal
- Known for: Contemporary dance and choreography
- Awards: Deutscher Tanzpreis (1995); Europe Theatre Prize (1999); Praemium Imperiale (1999); Goethe Prize (2008)
- Website: www.pinabausch.org

Philippine "Pina" Bausch (27 July 1940 – 30 June 2009) was a German dancer and choreographer who was a significant contributor to a neo-expressionist dance tradition now known as Tanztheater. Bausch's approach was noted for a stylised blend of dance movement, prominent sound design, and involved stage sets, as well as for engaging the dancers under her to help in the development of a piece, and her work had an influence on modern dance from the 1970s forward. She created the company Tanztheater Wuppertal, which performs internationally.

== Early life and education ==
Philippine Bausch, later known as Pina, (Note: Some sources erroneously spell her name "Philippina".) was born in Solingen, Germany, on 27 July 1940. Her parents were August and Anita Bausch, who owned a restaurant with guest rooms, where Pina was born. The restaurant provided Pina with a venue to start performing at a very young age. She would perform for all of the guests in the hotel and occasionally go into their rooms and dance while they were trying to read the newspaper. It was then that her parents saw her potential. These experiences at the restaurant would be a great influence for her choreography of Café Müller.

In 1955, Bausch was accepted into Kurt Jooss's Folkwangschule in Essen.

After graduation in 1959, Bausch left Germany with a scholarship from the German Academic Exchange Service to continue her studies at the Juilliard School in New York City in 1960, where her teachers included Antony Tudor, José Limón, Alfredo Corvino, and Paul Taylor.

== Career ==
Bausch was very soon performing with Tudor at the Metropolitan Opera Ballet Company, and with Paul Taylor at New American Ballet. When, in 1960, Taylor was invited to premiere a new work named Tablet in Spoleto, Italy, he took Bausch with him. In New York Bausch also performed with the Paul Sanasardo and Donya Feuer Dance Company and collaborated on two pieces with them in 1961.

In 1962, Bausch returned to Essen to join Jooss' new Folkwang-Ballett (Folkwang Ballet), as a soloist and assistant to Jooss. In 1968, she choreographed her first piece, Fragmente (Fragments), to music by Béla Bartók. In 1969, she succeeded Jooss as artistic director of the company.

Her 1968 piece for the Folkwang Ballet, Im Wind der Zeit, took first place for choreography in a competition at the International Summer Academy of Dance in Cologne in 1969. She continued to collaborate with the Sanasardo Company, showing some of her choreography in the United States, through which she met Dominique Mercy and Malou Airaudo, who would become founding members of her company.

=== Tanztheater Wuppertal Pina Bausch ===
Bausch was hired by Arno Wüstenhöfer, director of the Wuppertaler Bühnen, Wuppertal's municipal performing arts organization, to run the Opernhaus Wuppertal ballet beginning with the 1973/74 season. Bausch was given artistic autonomy, ran the company independently and renamed it the Tanztheater Wuppertal. The company has a large repertoire of original pieces, and regularly tours throughout the world from its home base of the Opernhaus Wuppertal. The company has continued since Bausch's death, touring her repertoire and new choreography.

Bausch faced substantial initial criticism after taking over as director of the Wuppertal Ballet in 1973. The audience in Wuppertal were more used to traditional ballet repertoire like Swan Lake, and found the themes and movements of Bausch's works violent. The audience often threw tomatoes, walked out of performances, and sent Bausch threatening letters. Critics also often commented on the jarring repetitive movements Bausch used to depict the abusive men/women relationships. American critic Arlene Croce famously described Bausch's work as "pornography of pain".

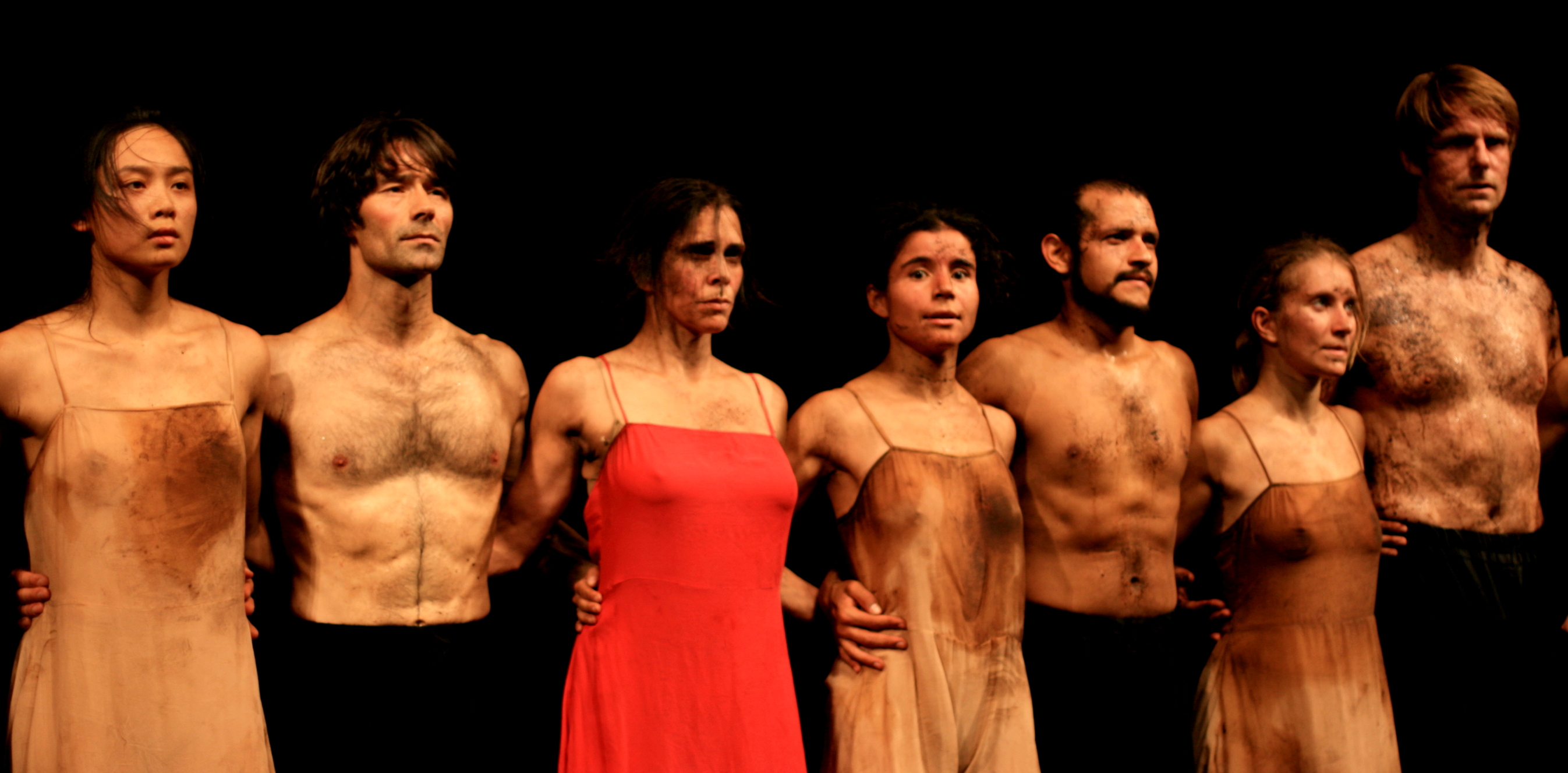
Frühlingsopfer, premiered in 1975, pictured in 2009

Her best-known dance-theatre works include the melancholic Café Müller (1978), in which dancers stumble around the stage crashing into tables and chairs, to arias by Henry Purcell. Bausch had most of the dancers perform this piece with their eyes closed. The six dancers continually lift, drop, and chase each other. The thrilling Frühlingsopfer (The Rite of Spring) (1975) required the stage to be completely covered with soil.

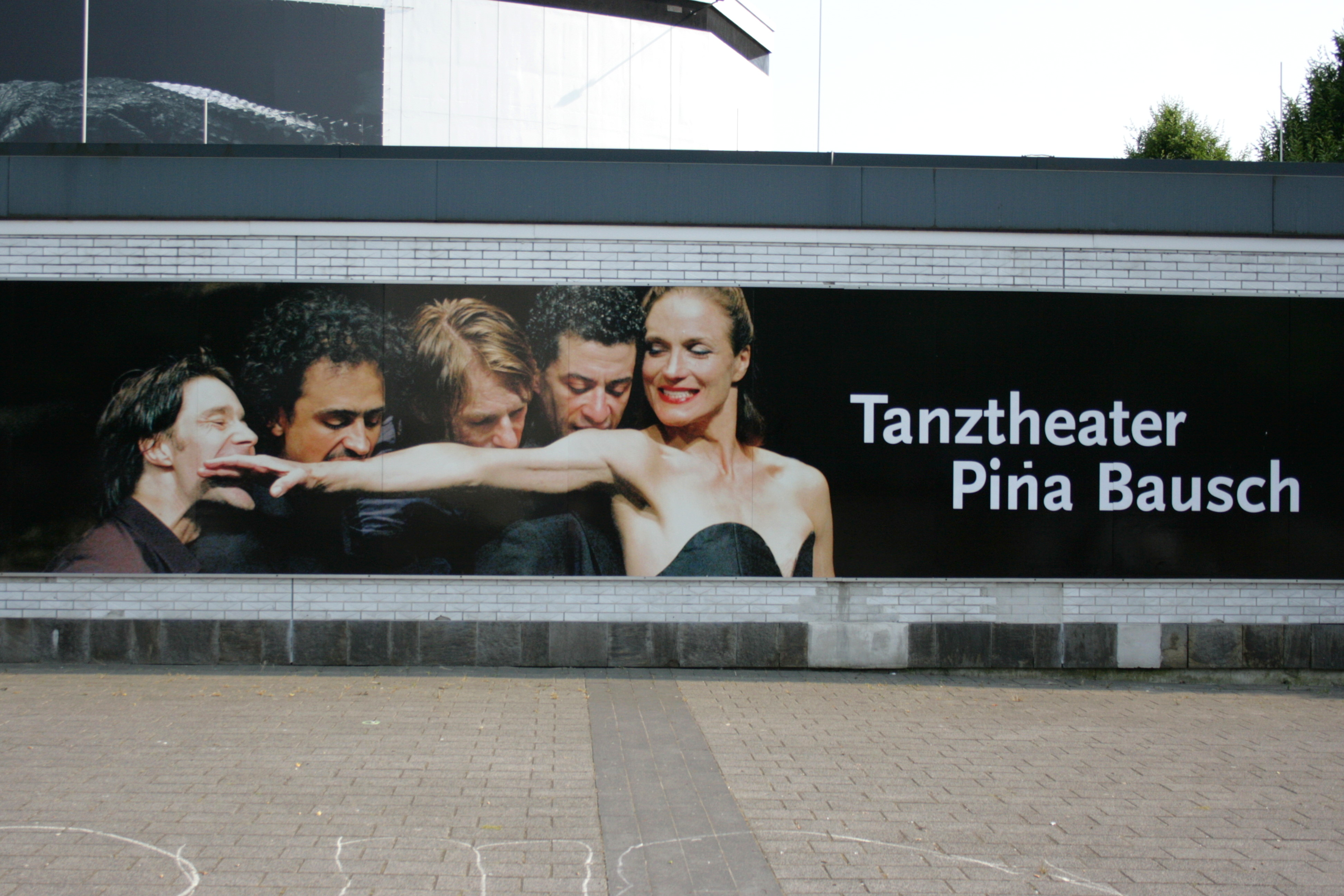
Poster in front of Schauspielhaus Wuppertal, 2008

In 1983, she played the role of La Principessa Lherimia in Federico Fellini's film And the Ship Sails On.

The Tanztheater Wuppertal Pina Bausch made its American debut in Los Angeles as the opening performance of the 1984 Olympic Arts Festival.

In 2009, Bausch collaborated with film director Wim Wenders on a 3D documentary, Pina, but died suddenly two days before the shoot was due to start in June 2009. After consultation with her family and company dancers, the film went ahead, documenting her life and work in a different way. The film premiered at the Berlin Film Festival in 2011.

== Style ==
Bausch's approach was noted for a stylized blend of dance movement, prominent sound design, and involved stage sets, as well as for engaging the dancers under her to help in the development of a piece. Her work, regarded as a continuation of the European and American expressionist movements, incorporated many expressly dramatic elements and often explored themes connected to trauma, particularly trauma arising out of relationships.

The term "dance theatre" (tanztheater) can be traced back to Rudolf Laban's theories. While Laban used the phrase in comparison with movement choirs, he didn't specify the content of dance theatre. It was his students such as Kurt Jooss and Mary Wigman who further developed their own theories regarding tanztheater. Having Jooss as a teacher and mentor, Bausch's pieces were largely influenced by the German expressionist dance tradition of Ausdruckstanz. Her pieces were simple and rejected the classical forms of ballet. The dances generally had little to no plot, no progression, and no sense of a specific geographical place.

When studying in New York, Bausch sought influence from Martha Graham, José Limón, and Anna Sokolow. These American influences can be seen in Bausch's choice of gestures and phrasing. For example, a defining characteristic of Bausch's work is the continuous repetition of movements, as seen in Rite of Spring.

Male-female interaction is a theme found throughout her work, which has been an inspiration for—and reached a wider audience through—the movie Talk to Her, directed by Pedro Almodóvar. Her pieces are constructed of short units of dialogue and action, often of a surreal nature. Repetition is an important structuring device. She stated: "Repetition is not repetition, ... The same action makes you feel something completely different by the end." Her large multi-media productions often involve elaborate sets and eclectic music. In Vollmond, half of the stage is taken up by a giant, rocky hill, and the score includes everything from Portuguese music to k.d. lang.

=== Stage design ===
Pina Bausch's Nelken (Carnations), 2005
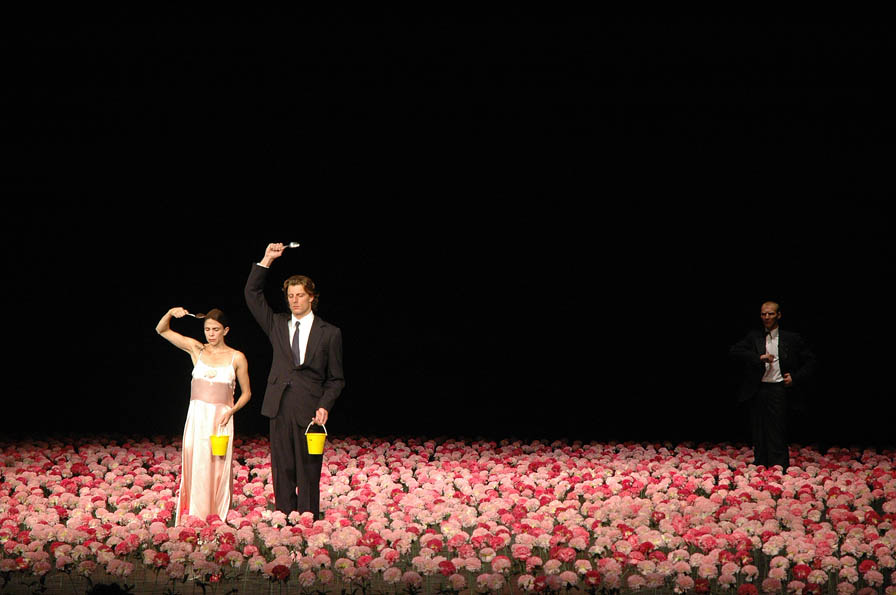

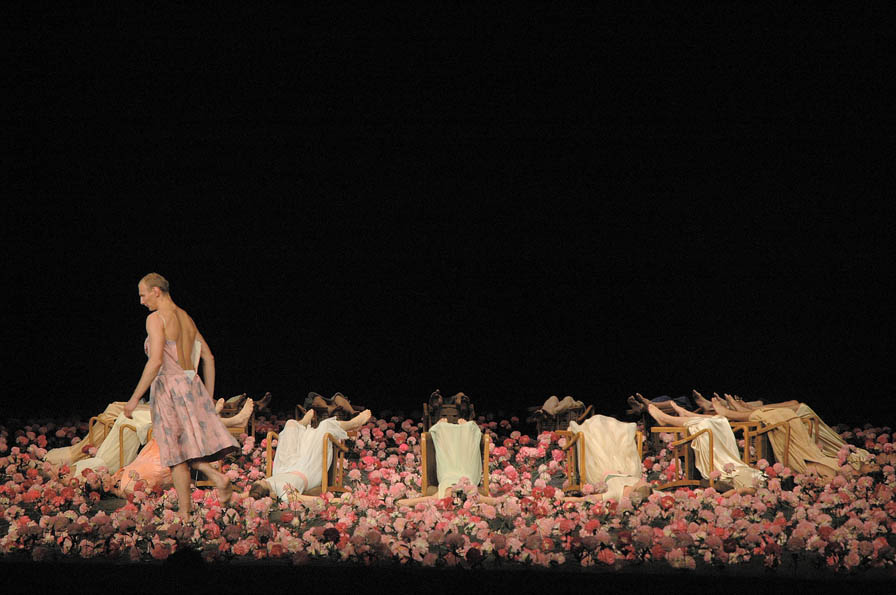

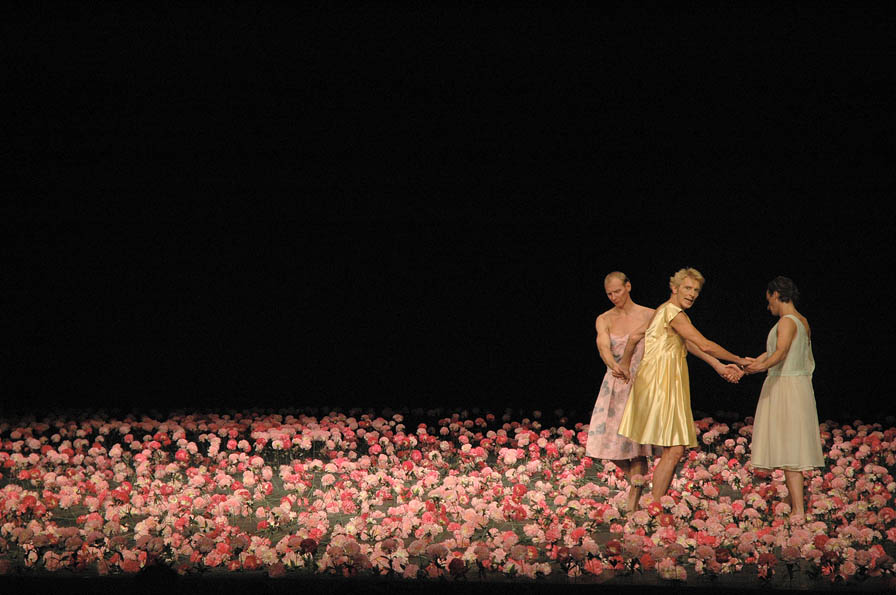

A distinct aspect of Pina Bausch's works is the stage design, which were designed by Rolf Borzik and then Peter Pabst after Borzik's death in 1980. Bausch's sets altered the stage floor itself and were often filled with elements of nature. In Rite of Spring, the stage is covered in dirt, In Vollmond (Full Moon), there is a large boulder on the stage with buckets of water as props, and in Nelken (Carnations), the stage is covered in carnations. The set pieces were often used as obstacles to challenge the dancers and enhance the emotion aspect of their performance. Pabst states that "A set should never be impressive on its own, only via the actors". In Café Müller, the dancers need to navigate through the chairs and tables with their eyes closed. In Vollmond, dancers are required to dance on wet floors and climb onto the boulder.

== Recognition and honours ==
Bausch was awarded the Deutscher Tanzpreis (German Dance Prize) in 1995.

In 1999, she was the recipient of the VII Europe Theatre Prize. As part of the reasons for being awarded the prize, the citation says:

Since she took over the direction of the Wuppertal Tanztheater 25 years ago, Pina Bausch has used her training and experience as a soloist in classical ballet to literally invent a new genre, a combination of theatre, dance, music, and visual arts in which score and improvisation come together, very close to the dream of a total theatre that juxtaposes the individual talents of an extraordinary ensemble with a precise concept of time and space.

In 2000, Pina Bausch and her company were nominated in the categories Best New Dance Production and Outstanding Achievement in Dance at the Laurence Olivier Awards for the conception of Viktor at Sadler's Wells Theatre in London. In 2009, they won Best New Dance Production for Café Müller and The Rite of Spring (Le Sacre Du Printemps). Bausch and her company were nominated several times for the Outstanding Achievement in Dance award, with Bausch winning it in 2006 for Nelken and Palermo, Palermo.

Bausch won the Kyoto Prize in Arts and Philosophy in 2007.

In 2008, the city of Frankfurt am Main awarded her its prestigious Goethe Prize.

She was elected a Foreign Honorary Member of the American Academy of Arts and Sciences in 2009.

== Personal life ==
Bausch was first married to Polish-born Rolf Borzik, who she met in the late 60s at the Folkwang School, and who became costume and set designer for Tanztheater Wuppertal until his death from leukaemia in 1980. Later that year, she met Ronald Kay, and in 1981 they had a son.

== Death and legacy ==
Bausch died on 30 June 2009 in Wuppertal, North Rhine Westphalia, Germany, aged 68, five days after receiving a diagnosis of lung cancer.

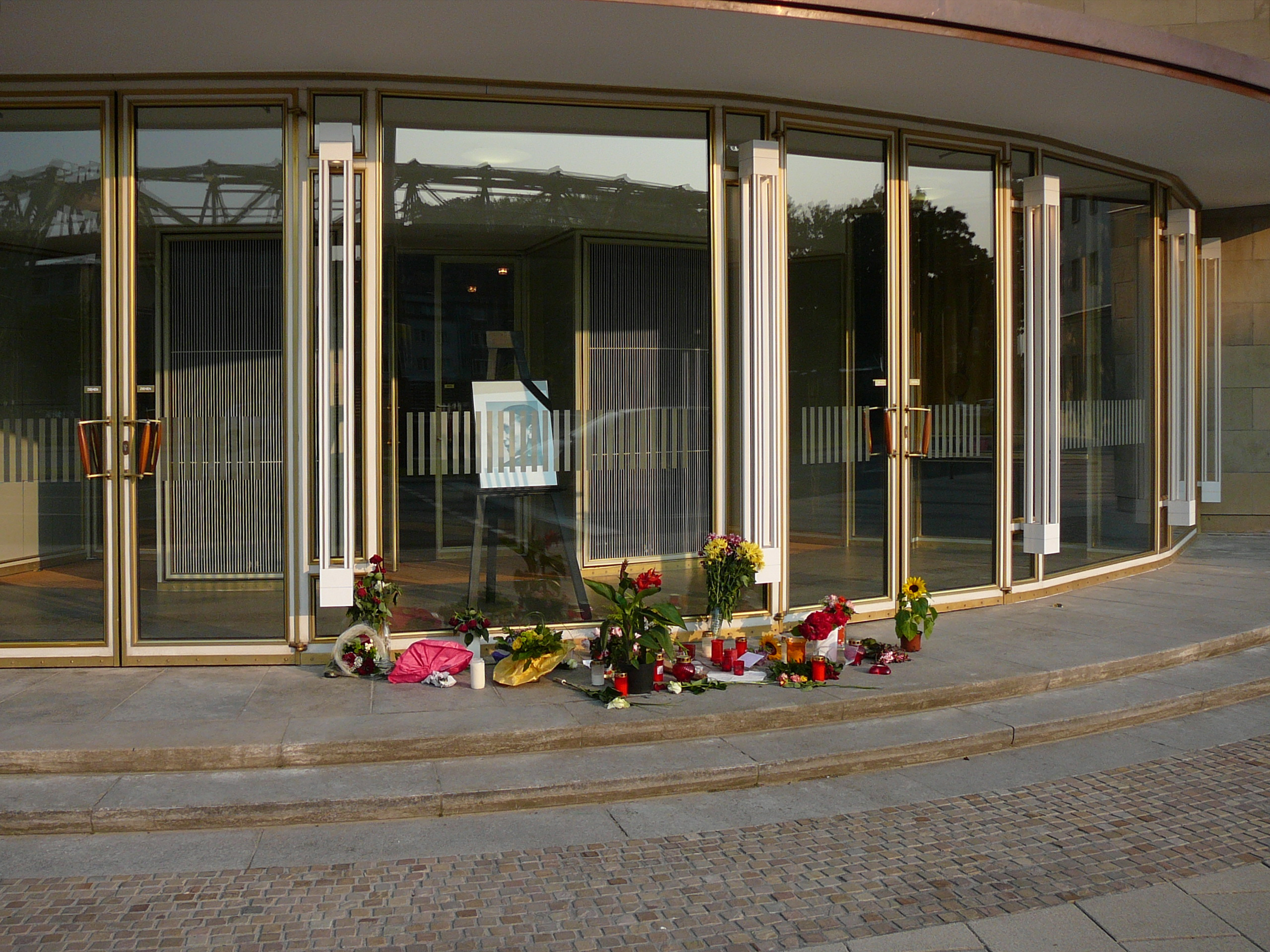
Flowers left at the Wuppertal Opernhaus (1 July 2009)

Her work had an influence on modern dance from the 1970s forward.

The same year, choreographer and experimental theatre-maker Dimitris Papaioannou created a piece called Nowhere to inaugurate the renovated main stage of the Greek National Theatre in Athens. The show's central and most prolific scene was dedicated to the memory of Bausch, and involved performers linking arms and stripping naked a man and woman.

In 2010 the dance company Les Ballets C de la B performed Out of Context – for Pina, which was dedicated to Bausch's memory. The show was directed and conceived by the company's founder Alain Platel, for whom Bausch was a friend and mentor.

In 2010 the choreographer Sidi Larbi Cherkaoui and dancer Shantala Shivalingappa premiered their work Play, which was dedicated to Bausch's memory. Bausch was the main impetus for the piece as she had brought Cherkaoui and Shivalingappa to collaborate in 2008 to perform for the final edition of her festival.

Wenders' documentary, Pina, was released in late 2011 in the United States, and is dedicated to her memory.

Works by Bausch were staged in June and July 2012 as a highlight of the Cultural Olympiad preceding the Olympic Games 2012 in London. The works were created when Bausch was invited to visit and stay in 10 global locations – in India, Brazil, Palermo, Hong Kong, Los Angeles, Budapest, Istanbul, Santiago, Rome, and Japan – between 1986 and 2009. Seven of the works had not been seen in the UK.

Bausch's style has influenced performers such as David Bowie, who designed part of his 1987 Glass Spider Tour with Bausch in mind. For the tour, Bowie "wanted to bridge together some kind of symbolist theatre and modern dance" and used Bausch's early work as a guideline.

Florence and the Machine's vocalist, Florence Welch, has been influenced by Bausch's work. She said in a 2022 interview: "Pina has been one of the biggest influences on my life, especially on my performance style... Her work speaks to me in a way that is really hard to put into words, and I think that is the point of dance."

== In popular culture ==
Promotional trailers for the third season of American Horror Story: Coven included a clip for the episode "Detention" and were likely influenced by Bausch's work Blaubart. Stills from the performance and the episode show a group of women seemingly defying gravity as they cling to the walls high above the ground, toes pointed down and hands pressed above them. The photo of Bausch's performance was previously released on Reddit and Twitter with the implication that it was from a Russian mental institution, but its source was quickly identified. The character Pina in Beastars is named after Bausch.

== Works ==
The following table shows works since 1973. Several of Pina Bausch's works were announced as Tanzabend because she chose a title late in the development of a work. The typical subtitle from 1978 was Stück von Pina Bausch (A piece by Pina Bausch). The translations are given as on the website of Tanztheater Wuppertal Pina Bausch. Some of the German titles are ambiguous. "Kontakthof" is composed of Kontakt ("contact") and Hof ("court, courtyard"), resulting in "courtyard of contact," which is also a technical term for an area in some brothels where the first contact with prostitutes is possible. "Ich bring dich um die Ecke," literally "I'll take you around the corner," can mean "I'll accompany you around the corner" but also colloquially "I'll kill you." "Ahnen" can mean "ancestors," but also (as a verb) "to foresee", "bode", "suspect."

The details about the music for the works until 1986 follow a book by Raimund Hoghe who was dramaturge in Wuppertal.

| Year | Title | Subtitle | Translation | Music | Notes |
|---|---|---|---|---|---|
| 1973 | Fritz | Tanzabend | | by Gustav Mahler and Wolfgang Hufschmidt | |
| 1973 | Iphigenie auf Tauris | Tanzoper | Iphigenia in Tauris | Gluck's opera Iphigenie auf Tauris | |
| 1974 | Zwei Krawatten | | Two ties | | Choreography of a revue |
| 1974 | Ich bring' dich um die Ecke | Schlagerballett | I'll do you in | Dance music after old Schlager | ambiguous title |
| 1974 | Adagio | Fünf Lieder von Gustav Mahler | Adagio / Five songs by Gustav Mahler | Mahler's Five songs | |
| 1975 | Orpheus und Eurydike | Tanzoper | | Gluck's opera Orpheus und Eurydike | |
| 1975 | Frühlingsopfer | Wind von West; Der zweite Frühling; Le Sacre du Printmps | The Rite of Spring | Stravinsky's ballet The Rite of Spring | |
| 1976 | Die sieben Todsünden | Die sieben Todsünden der Kleinbürger; Fürchtet Euch nicht | The Seven Deadly Sins | The Seven Deadly Sins, music: Kurt Weill, libretto: Bertolt Brecht | Ballet with pantomime, dance and singing (soprano and male quartet) |
| 1977 | Blaubart | Beim Anhören einer Tonbandaufnahme von Béla Bartóks Oper Herzog Blaubarts Burg, Stück von Pina Bausch | Bluebeard / while listening to a taped recording of Béla Bartók's opera Duke Bluebeard's Castle, a piece by Pina Bausch | Bartók's opera Bluebeard's Castle | |
| 1977 | Komm tanz mit mir | Stück unter Verwendung von alten Volksliedern | Come dance with me, piece using old folk songs | old folk songs | |
| 1977 | Renate wandert aus | Operette von Pina Bausch | Renate emigrates | Schlager, Songs, Evergreens | |
| 1978 | Er nimmt sie an der Hand und führt sie in sein Schloss, die anderen folgen ... | Stück von Pina Bausch | He takes her by the hand and leads her into the castle, the others follow ... | | Schauspielhaus Bochum |
| 1978 | Café Müller | Stück von Pina Bausch | | by Henry Purcell | |
| 1978 | Kontakthof | | Court of contact | Schlager of the 1930s, a.o. | ambiguous title |
| 1979 | Arien | Stück von Pina Bausch | Arias | by Beethoven, Comedian Harmonists, Mozart, old Italian arias, sung by Benjamino Gigli, a.o. | |
| 1979 | Keuschheitslegende | Stück von Pina Bausch | Legend of chastity | by Nino Rota, Robin/Styne, George Gershwin, Georg Boulanger, Peter Kreuder, Barnabas von Geczy, a.o. | |
| 1980 | 1980 – Ein Stück von Pina Bausch | | 1980 A piece by Pina Bausch | Old English folk songs, Shakespeare songs, Comedian Harmonists, Judy Garland, a.o. | |
| 1980 | Bandoneon | Stück von Pina Bausch | | Tangoes, sung a.o. by Carlos Gardel | |
| 1982 | Walzer | Stück von Pina Bausch | Waltz | by Edith Piaf, Tino Rossi, a.o. | |
| 1982 | Nelken | Stück von Pina Bausch | Carnations | by Franz Schubert, George Gershwin, Sophie Tucker, a.o. | New version in 1983 at the Theaterfestival München |
| 1984 | Auf dem Gebirge hat man ein Geschrei gehört | Stück von Pina Bausch | On the mountain a cry was heard | by Heinrich Schütz, Henry Purcell, Felix Mendelssohn, Irish pipe music, Billie Holiday, Tommy Dorsey, Fred Astaire, a.o. | |
| 1985 | Two Cigarettes in the Dark | Stück von Pina Bausch | | by Monteverdi, Brahms, Beethoven, Bach, Hugo Wolf, Purcell, Ben Webster, Alberta Hunter, Minnelieder, a.o. | |
| 1986 | Viktor | Stück von Pina Bausch | | Folk music from Lombardy, Tuscany, Southern Italy, Sardinia and Bolivia, medieval dance music, Russian Waltz, music from New Orleans, dance music of the 1930s, music by Tchaikovsky, Buxtehude, Dvořák and Khachaturian, a.o. | |
| 1987 | Ahnen | | Suspecting | | ambiguous title |
| 1989 | Palermo Palermo | | | | |
| 1991 | Tanzabend II | | Dance Evening II | | |
| 1993 | Das Stück mit dem Schiff | | The Piece with the Ship | | |
| 1994 | Ein Trauerspiel | | A Tragedy | | |
| 1995 | Danzón | | | | |
| 1996 | Nur Du | | Only you | | |
| 1997 | Der Fensterputzer | | The window washer | | |
| 1998 | Masurca Fogo | | | | |
| 1999 | O Dido | | | | |
| 2000 | Wiesenland | | Meadowland | | |
| 2000 | Kontakthof – Mit Damen und Herren ab 65 | | Kontakthof – with men and women of age 65 and up | | |
| 2001 | Água | | Portuguese for "Water" | | |
| 2002 | Für die Kinder von gestern, heute und morgen | | For the children of yesterday, today, and tomorrow | | |
| 2003 | Nefés | | Turkish for "Breath" | | |
| 2004 | Ten Chi | | | | |
| 2005 | Rough Cut | | | | |
| 2006 | Vollmond | | Full Moon | | |
| 2007 | Bamboo Blues | | | | |
| 2008 | Sweet Mambo | | | | |
| 2008 | Kontakthof – Mit Teenagern ab 14 | | Kontakthof, with teenagers 14 years and up | | |
| 2009 | ... como el musguito en la piedra, ay si, si, si ... | | ... like the moss on the stone ... | | |

== Filmography ==
- 1980 Die Generalprobe. Documentary. Dir.: Werner Schroeter
- 1983 What Are Pina Bausch and Her Dancers Doing in Wuppertal?. Documentary. Dir.: Klaus Wildenhahn
- 1983 Plaisir du théâtre. TV mini-series documentary. Dir.: Georges Bensoussan
- 1983 And the Ship Sails On. Drama. Dir.: Federico Fellini
- 1983 Un jour Pina m'a demandé. TV documentary. Dir.: Chantal Akerman
- 1990 The Complaint of an Empress. Dir.: Pina Bausch
- 1990 3res 14torze 16tze. TV series. Episode dated 26 January 1990. Dir.: Cristina Ferrer
- 1998 Lissabon Wuppertal Lisboa. TV documentary. Dir.: Fernando Lopes
- 2002 Talk to Her. Drama. Dir.: Pedro Almodóvar
- 2002 Pina Bausch – A Portrait by Peter Lindbergh based on 'Der Fensterputzer'. TV short. Dir.: Peter Lindbergh
- 2004 La mandrágora. TV series. Dir.: Miguel Sarmiento
- 2006 Pina Bausch. TV documentary. Dir.: Anne Linsel
- 2010 Dancing Dreams. Documentary. Dir.: Rainer Hoffmann, Anne Linsel
- 2011 Pina – Dance Dance Otherwise We Are Lost. Documentary. Dir.: Wim Wenders
- 2011 Understanding Pina: The Legacy of Pina Bausch. Documentary. Dir.: Kathy Sullivan and Howard Silver
