= Egon Madsen =

Danish ballet dancer, teacher, ballet master and company director

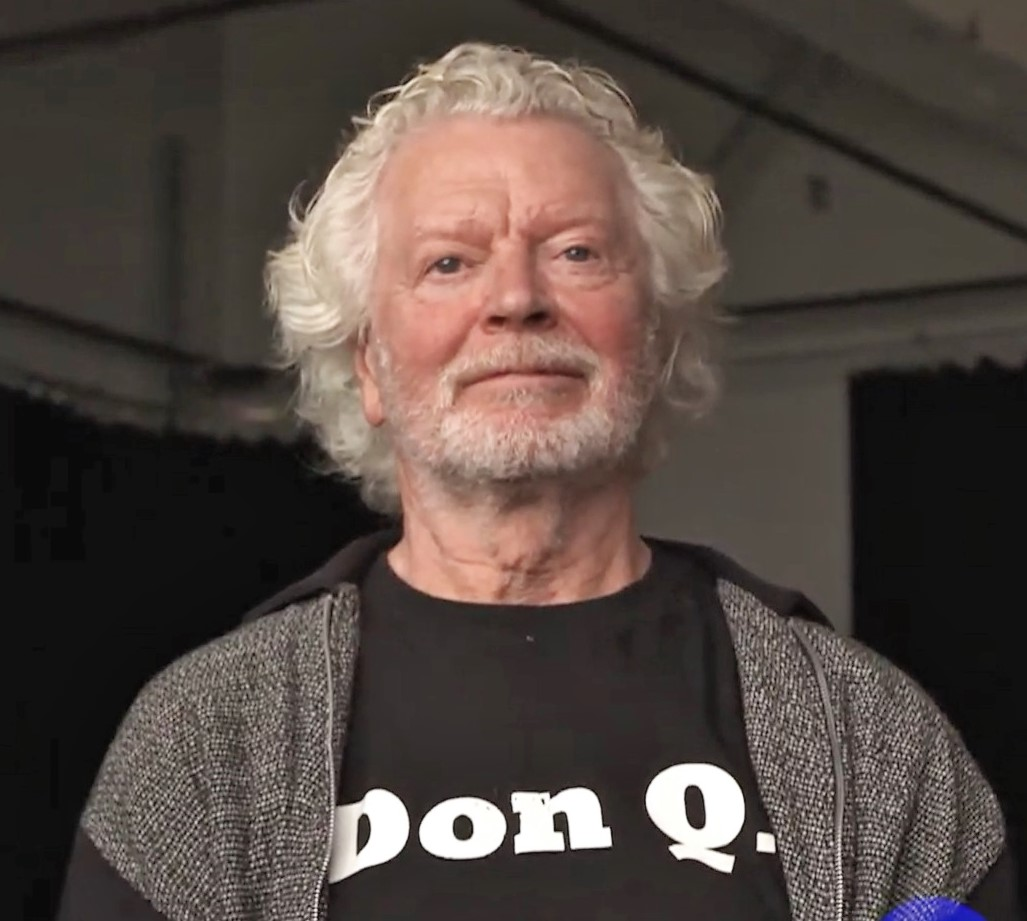
- Madsden in 2018
- Born: 24 August 1942 (age 84); Ringe, Denmark
- Occupations: ballet dancer; teacher; ballet master; company director
- Spouse: Lucia Isenring
- Dancing career
- Former groups: Stuttgart Ballet; NDT 3

Egon Madsen (born 24 August 1942) is a Danish ballet dancer, teacher, ballet master and company director. In 1961, he joined the Stuttgart Ballet, where John Cranko had become the director. Madsen was hired as a soloist but was soon promoted to principal dancer, and created numerous roles for Cranko. He retired from Stuttgart in 1981.

After Madsen retired, he worked as a teacher and ballet master, and occasionally performed. In the 1980s, he served as director of Frankfurt Ballet, Royal Swedish Ballet and the ballet company at Teatro Comunale, Florence. He returned to Stuttgart Ballet in 1990, first as a ballet master, then as assistant artistic director, a position he held until 1996. In 1999, he returned to the stage as a member of Nederlands Dans Theater's NDT 3, where he was also a teacher and rehearsal director. He remained in the troupe until it was disbanded in 2006.

== Early life and training ==
Madsen was born in Ringe. He began ballet training at age nine, under Thea Jolles in Aarhus. The Royal Danish Ballet School rejected him as his physique was deemed too frail, so until age fifteen, he continued to study under Jolles and danced at her company, the Danish Children's Ballet.

== Career ==
In 1957, Madsen moved to Copenhagen. He joined the Pantomime Theatre in Tivoli Gardens, while also attending private ballet classes with Birger Bartholin and Edite Frandsen. In 1959, he joined Elsa-Marianne von Rosen's Scandinavian Ballet, which toured in Denmark and Sweden, as a soloist. When the Scandinavian Ballet was not touring, he would dance at Pantomime Theatre. The Royal Danish Ballet was not interested in hiring him as he never attended the school.

In 1961, when Madsen was 19, he moved to Germany and joined the Stuttgart Ballet, where choreographer John Cranko had recently become the company's artistic director. Madsen was hired as a soloist but was soon promoted to principal dancer. He became one of Cranko's muses. Dance critic Horst Koegler wrote that Madsen "charmed his audiences with his mercurial temperament and high spirits, as he was a "born bouncer" and an irrepressible comedian," but "also had an introspective side." Among the Cranko ballets Madsen created roles in are Romeo and Juliet (1962, as Paris), Swan Lake (1963, as Prince Siegfried), Jeu de cartes (1965, as the Joker), Onegin (1965, as Lensky), Pas de quatre, The Nutcracker (both 1966), The Taming of the Shrew (1969, as Gremio),Poème de l'extase, Brouillards (both 1970), Carmen (1971, as Don José) and Initials R.B.M.E. (1972), in which the "E" in the title referred to Egon Madsen.

Madsen also originated roles for other choreographers. For Kenneth MacMillan, he created the role of Messenger of Death in Song of the Earth (1965), in The Sphinx (1968) and Requiem (1976). Madsen also created a role in Glen Tetley's Daphnis and Chloe (1975), and the role of Armand Duval in John Neumeier's The Lady of the Camellias (1978). In 1981, Madsen was awarded the John Cranko Medal for his services to the Stuttgart Ballet and for preserving Cranko's heritage. He then retired from the company.

Upon leaving Stuttgart, Madsen served as the director of Frankfurt Ballet. He tried to build a mixed repertory consisting of 19th-century classics, George Balanchine's neoclassical ballets, Cranko's story ballets, and contemporary ballets. His efforts were unsuccessful, and he left Frankfurt in 1984. Madsen then directed the Royal Swedish Ballet between 1984 and 1986, and the ballet company at Teatro Comunale, Florence from 1986 to 1988. In 1990, he returned to Stuttgart Ballet as a ballet master. The following year, he was appointed assistant artistic director, a position he held until 1996. In 1997, he joined the Leipzig Ballet as principal ballet master. In 1999, the 57-year-old Madsen began performing on stage again as a member of NDT 3, Nederlands Dans Theater's troupe consisting of dancers over age 40. He was also a teacher and rehearsal director at the company. He remained in the company until it was disbanded in 2006.

Madsen continues to teach internationally. He often works with choreographer Eric Gauthier and his Stuttgart-based company, Gauthier Dance, as a coach. In 2007, he appeared in Don Q, a remake of Don Quixote made for him by Christian Spuck. In 2011, he won the Deutscher Tanzpreis. In 2015, Madsen conceived and starred in the play Greyhounds, about dancers and aging, at Theaterhaus Stuttgart. The play also featured retired Stuttgart dancers Marianne Kruuse, Julia Krämer and Thomas Lempertz, and choreography by Gauthier, Neumeier, Mauro Bigonzetti, Marco Goecke, and Amos Ben-Tal. In 2018, celebrating his 75th birthday, Madsen appeared in a special programme by Gauthier Dance, performing in Don Q, Greyhounds, Bigonzetti's Cantata and 7557. In 2019, he performed as Franz Joseph I of Austria in MacMillan's Mayerling with the Stuttgart Ballet. In 2020, he performed Bigonzetti's solo Egon King Madsen Lear.

== Personal life ==
Madsen is married to Lucia Isenring, also a ballet dancer. As of 2017, they live in Montemontanaro, Italy.
