= Sonia Santiago =

- Born: 1 November 1966; Madrid, Spain
- Other names: Sonia Santiago-Brückner
- Education: John Cranko Schule
- Occupations: Ballerina; Ballet teacher
- Years active: 1990–present
- Organization: Stuttgart Ballet

Sonia Santiago (also: Sonia Santiago-Brückner, born 1 November 1966) is a ballet dancer and ballet teacher.

Sonia Santiago was born in Madrid. She grew up in Germany and began ballet dancing at age five. She studied at the John Cranko Schule, graduating in 1985. She danced first with the companies of the Staatstheater Saarbrücken (de) and the Staatsoper Hannover. In 1990, she was engaged at the Stuttgart Ballet, promoted to soloist in 1994 and to first soloist in 1997.

Several solo parts were created for her, including choreographies by Christian Spuck, Stephan Thoss and Renato Zanella. She danced in choreographies by Maurice Béjart, Nacho Duato, William Forsythe, Marcia Haydée, Jiří Kylián, Hans van Manen, Uwe Scholz and Glen Tetley, among others. From 2001, she has worked as a free-lance ballet trainer and dancer, including dance projects with children in schools.
