= Daniel Camargo =

Brazilian ballet dancer

- Born: September 1991 (age 34); Sorocaba, Brazil
- Education: John Cranko School
- Occupation: Ballet dancer
- Years active: 2009–present
- Career
- Current group: American Ballet Theatre
- Former groups: Stuttgart Ballet; Dutch National Ballet

Daniel Camargo (born September 1991) is a Brazilian ballet dancer. He joined the Stuttgart Ballet in 2009, and was promoted to principal dancer in 2013. In 2016, he left to join the Dutch National Ballet, before leaving in 2019 to pursue a freelance career. In 2022, he joined the American Ballet Theatre.

== Early life and training ==
Camargo was born in Sorocaba. He started ballet at age nine, at the encouragement of his two sisters' dance teacher. A year later, he moved to the ballet school at Teatro Guaíra, Curitiba. At age twelve, Camargo competed at the Youth America Grand Prix (YAGP), winning the second prize in the junior section. He returned to YAGP a year later, again winning the second prize, as well as a scholarship to the summer intensive programme at the Harid Conservatory in Florida. He was also offered a scholarship to attend the summer course at the American Ballet Theatre's Jacqueline Kennedy Onassis School, but the trip was cancelled at the last minute as his chaperone became unavailable.

After his second YAGP, he was also approached by Tadeusz Matacz, the director of the John Cranko School in Stuttgart, to attend the school on scholarship. He began training there in autumn 2005, at age 14, even though he initially could not speak German and English, the two languages used at the school. He trained in various ballet styles, including the Russian Vaganova method and the French style. For his graduation, he danced Uwe Scholz's Notations I-IV, a 40-minute long solo.

== Career ==
In 2009, after graduating, Camargo joined the Stuttgart Ballet as a member of the corps de ballet. In 2010, he won the Deutscher Tanzpreis "Future" prize. In 2011, Camargo and colleague Elisa Badenes represented the company at the Erik Bruhn Prize. They performed the Act III pas de deux from Don Quixote, and Little Monsters, which Demis Volpi choreographed for the competition. Both Camargo and Badenes won the inaugural Audience Choice Award. In 2012, when Maximiliano Guerra staged his production of Don Quixote for the company, Camargo, who had reached the rank of demi-soloist, was chosen to dance the lead role of Basilio on opening night, rather than any of the principal dancers. Later that year, he was promoted to soloist. Camargo was promoted to principal dancer in 2013, at only age 22.

In 2016, Camargo left Stuttgart to join the Dutch National Ballet as a principal dancer. He later stated that the move was due to the performance schedule at Stuttgart Ballet limited his ability to perform internationally as a guest, and his desire for new experience after spending 11 years in Stuttgart. At the two companies, his repertory include classical ballets, works by John Cranko, Hans van Manen, Jerome Robbins, Glen Tetley, Alexei Ratmansky, among others. He also created roles for Wayne McGregor, Jorma Elo and Christian Spuck. He was nominated for the Prix Benois de la Danse in 2018 and 2019. In July 2019, he left the Dutch National Ballet to pursue a freelance career, in order to have more control over his schedule and what project to pursue.

In 2020, when the COVID-19 pandemic began, Camargo took time off from ballet. In 2021, he was invited by Septime Webre, the artistic director of Hong Kong Ballet, to dance with the company as a guest artist. He created roles in Webre's new The Nutcracker and Romeo + Juliet. He also danced in The Sleeping Beauty and "Emerald" and "Diamond" from Balanchine's Jewels with the company. That year, he also appeared in two films, including Coppelia, an adaptation of the classical ballet of the same name, in which he portrayed Franz, and Birds of Paradise, Sarah Adina Smith's ballet-themed film.

In July 2022, Camargo joined the American Ballet Theatre as a principal dancer, after dancing with the company as a guest artist during its Metropolitan Opera House season that began in June. He was approached by Ratmansky, ABT's artist in residence, when the company was dealing with injuries within its ranks while Camargo began seeking consistency following the pandemic. During the season, he danced in Don Quixote, Swan Lake, MacMillan's Romeo and Juliet, as well as the New York premiere of Ratmansky's Of Love and Rage as Dionysius. He officially joined the company towards the end of the season. Among the other ballets in which Camargo has performed to acclaim are Giselle, Ratmansky's version of The Firebird, and Frederick Ashton's The Dream.
