= Marco Goecke =

German choreographer (born 1972)

- Born: 12 April 1972 (age 54); Wuppertal, West Germany
- Occupation: Choreographer
- Years active: 2001–present

Marco Goecke (born 12 April 1972) is a German choreographer currently serving as the artistic director of Ballett Basel since August 2025, and had also held the positions of house choreographer at Stuttgart Ballet, Scapino Ballet, Nederlands Dans Theater and Gauthier Dance. He had additionally choreographed works for Paris Opera Ballet, Berlin State Ballet, Les Ballets de Monte-Carlo and Vienna State Ballet, among others. Die Welt's Manuel Brug called him "the most important choreographer in Germany."

In February 2023 he smeared dog feces on the face of a female dance critic who had reviewed him negatively for years. After the attack he was removed from his position as head of Hanover State Opera’s ballet company. In late May 2024 Goecke was announced to be the director of ballet for the Theater Basel for the upcoming season 2025/2026.

== Early life ==
Goecke was born on 12 April 1972 in Wuppertal, Germany. His father worked in an office at a factory and his mother as a secretary. He has an older sister.

Goecke began ballet training in 1988. He studied at the Ballet Academy Cologne, the Tanzinstitut Heinz-Bosl-Stiftung in Munich, and from 1989 to 1995 at the Royal Conservatory of The Hague.

== Career ==
In 1997, Goecke began dancing professionally with Deutsche Staatsoper Berlin, then at the ballet of Hagen Theatre. In 2000, he made his choreographic debut with a piece entitled Loch, for Hagen Theatre.

In 2005 Goecke became the choreographer in residence at the Stuttgart Ballet. In 2008 he was named resident choreographer at Scapino Ballet in Rotterdam. In 2013, he was an appointed associate choreographer at the Nederlands Dans Theater. In 2018, he became the resident choreographer at Stuttgart's Gauthier Dance. In 2019, he was named the director of Hanover State Ballet, the ballet of Staatsoper Hannover.

Goecke was described as "the most important choreographer in Germany." As of 2023 he has created more than 80 works, some of which are in the repertoires of the Paris Opera Ballet, Les Ballets de Monte Carlo, the National Ballet of Canada, Berlin State Ballet, Vienna State Ballet, and Ballett Zürich. Most of his works are less than 30 minutes in length.

Goecke's work is noted for its focus on the upper body; costuming is typically black trousers with taupe tops on the women and bare chests for men. Movement is primarily by the arms, hands, and torso and described as fluttering, twitching, shaking, spasming, trembling, with great rapidity and precision. The movements in his pieces are often described as making little sense and seemingly chosen only to be ugly or different.

Goecke's sets are typically dimly lit. He often includes items spread on or falling onto the stage or being tossed by dancers such as feathers, rose petals, balloons, or dead leaves or flour. Costumes are sometimes trimmed with items that move, such as fringes, or make sounds, such as walnuts. The dancers also create intentional sounds by pattering their feet or sometimes shrieking or quacking. Musical choices are often diverse within a piece and are chosen for mood.

In 2004 he was invited by Pina Bausch to present his 2003 Blushing and 2004 Mopey at the Tanztheater festival. His 2006 narrative choreography of Tchaikovsky's The Nutcracker was filmed for ZDFtheaterkanal.

Goecke's Nijinski (2016) was called out by the 2022 Deutscher Tanzpreis jury as a milestone in his career.

His In the Dutch Mountains (2023) was about his relationship with the Netherlands, where he studied; it was partially inspired by the 1984 novel In the Mountains of the Netherlands by Cees Noteboom and the 1987 song of the same name by the Nits.

== Incident with critic ==
On 12 February 2023, Goecke smeared his dog's feces on the face of Wiebke Hüster, a dance critic whose mostly-negative review of the Nederlands Dans Theater premiere of his work In the Dutch Mountains had appeared in that day's Frankfurter Allgemeine Zeitung. He confronted Hüster during the intermission of a show including one of his works at the Hanover State Ballet, telling her that her piece had caused people to cancel their season tickets, and threatening to ban her from the premises. He then pulled out a bag of feces and smeared them on her face.

Goecke said the review had angered him, and that Hüster had written only two positive pieces about his work in the twenty years she'd been covering it. He said that critics should not write in "a personal and hateful way". He said "I apologize for the fact I finally blew my top, but I also ask for a certain understanding at least for the reasons why this happened." He said he hoped to start a debate on what art critics should be allowed to say in their reviews.

In the wake of the incident Goecke was charged with assault. The Hanover Opera House suspended Goecke after the incident, and on 16 February, the opera house director Laura Berman announced that "by mutual agreement", it was decided that Goecke would step down from his role as the director of the Hanover State Ballet immediately, though his works will remain in the company's repertory. Berman stated it was because Goecke's works are "incomparable" and her belief that his works should be viewed separate from the incident. The Nederlands Dans Theater announced that although Goecke's action was "contrary to our values", after "a difficult companywide conversation" and Goecke's apology, the company decided to maintain its association with Goecke. The Australian Ballet, however, withdrew its plan to tour Kunstkamer, which featured contributions by Goecke and three other choreographers, to the Royal Opera House in London, citing the incident as the reason.

Proceedings against Goecke were discontinued in November 2023, after the prosecution concluded that Hüster did not suffer lasting damage and Goecke donated a four-digit amount to a non-profit association that deals with conflict resolution.

In late May 2024, Marco Goecke was announced to be the ballet director for the Theater Basel from the upcoming season 2025/2026. On the occasion, the theater's Artistic Director Benedikt von Peter praised Goecke as an exceptional artist, who deserved a second chance.

== Reception ==
Goecke was awarded the Prix Dom Perignon at Hamburg for his 2003 Blushing. In 2006 he won the Nijinsky Award at Monte-Carlo for most promising choreographer. In 2015 and 2021 the German dance magazine Tanz named him Choreographer of the Year.

In 2017 Goecke won the Gouden Zwaan for most impressive dance production for Midnight Raga, and the Danza & Danza award for best choreography for Nijinski. In 2022 he won the Deutscher Tanzpreis, sharing the award with Christoph Winkler. The jury said his work was extraordinary, that he had created an "unmistakable signature", and that he had contributed to the development of modern dance.

The New York Times called him "renowned" and said that as of 2023 he had for more than a decade been "a star" in European ballet. In Thin Skin, the 2016 documentary, he was called "one of the world's leading choreographers".

== Works ==
2000

- Loch, Theater Hagen / Choreographic Competition Hanover (Music: Schubert, Mozart)

2001

- Chicks, Stuttgart Ballet Noverre Society (Music: Nirvana, Pēteris Vasks, Bach)

2002

- Demigods, Stuttgart Ballet Noverre Society (Music: Tori Amos, Garbage, Michael Jüllich)

2003

- Blushing, Hamburg Ballet (Music: Tom Waits, The Cramps, Ho Road)
- Ring Them Bells, Stuttgart Ballet (Music: John Kander and Fred Ebb)

2004

- Mopey, Peter Boal and Company, New York (Solo. Music: Carl Philipp Emmanuel Bach, The Cramps)
- Ickyucky, Stuttgart Ballet Noverre Society (Music: Patti Smith, Jimi Hendrix)

2005

- Sweet Sweet Sweet, Stuttgart Ballet (music: concept by Marco Goecke, Herbert Schnarr)
- Äffi, Stuttgart Ballet/International ARDT Ballet Gala, Arnhem (Solo. Music: Johnny Cash)
- Beautiful Freak, Hamburg Ballet (Music: Chet Baker, Michael Jüllich)
- The Rest is Silence, Scapino Ballet Rotterdam (Music: Stephen Foster)

2006

- Everything, Staatstheater Braunschweig (lyrics: Ingeborg Bachmann)
- Viciouswishes, Stuttgart Ballet (Music: Steve Reich, György Ligeti)
- Nutcracker, Stuttgart Ballet (full-length. Music: Pyotr Ilyich Tchaikovsky, Mahalia Jackson)

2007

- Sonnet, Leipzig Ballet (Music: Robert Johnson, Henry Purcell, John Dowland, Text: William Shakespeare)
- Bravo Charlie, Scapino Ballet Rotterdam (Music: Keith Jarrett)

2008

- Albums, Stuttgart Ballet (Music: Beethoven, Miles Davis)
- Suite Suite Suite, Leipzig Ballet (Music: Bach)
- Whiteout, Les Ballets de Monte Carlo (Music: Bob Dylan)
- Nothing, Nederlands Dans Theatre II (Music: Keith Jarrett, Jimi Hendrix)

2009

- Supernova, Scapino Ballet Rotterdam (Music: Pierre Louis Garcia-Leccia, Antony and the Johnsons, Fabian Smit)
- Fancy Goods, Stuttgart Ballet (Solo. Music: Sarah Vaughn)
- Fur, Norwegian National Ballet (Music: Keith Jarrett)
- Le Chant du Rossignol, Leipzig Ballet (Music: Igor Stravinsky)
- Killed, Les Ballets de Monte Carlo (Solo. Music: Barbara)
- Specter de la Rose, Les Ballets de Monte Carlo (Music: Carl Maria von Weber)
- 2010: Pierrot Lunaire, Scapino Ballet Rotterdam (Music: Arnold Schoenberg)

2010

- Orlando, Stuttgart Ballet (full-length. Music: Michael Tippett, Philip Glass)
- Firebird Pas de deux, Scapino Ballet for Nederlandse Dansdagen Maastricht (Music: Stravinsky)
- For Sascha, New York Choreographic Institute

2011

- Songs for Drella, Scapino Ballet Rotterdam (full-length, choreographed with Ed Wubbe. Music: John Cale, Lou Reed, Jimmy Smith, Charles Mingus)
- Place a Chill, Pacific Northwest Ballet, Seattle (Music: Camille Saint-Saëns)
- Dearest Earthly Friend, Les Ballets de Monte Carlo (Music: György Ligeti)
- In sensu, Stuttgart Ballet (Solo. Music: Vivaldi)

2012

- Garbo Laughs, Nederlands Dans Theatre (Music: György Ligeti, Ray Charles)
- Black Breath, Stuttgart Ballet (Music: György Ligeti, Bonnie Prince Billy)
- And the Sky on That Cloudy Old Day, Berlin State Ballet (Music: John Adams)
- Dancer in the Dark, Stuttgart Ballet and Schauspiel Stuttgart (full-length. Choreographed with Louis Stiens. Director: Christian Brey. Musical arrangement: Matthias Klein)
- Nap, Stuttgart Ballet (Solo. Music: Sinéad O'Connor)

2013

- I Found A Fox, Gauthier Dance (Solo. Music: Kate Bush)
- Peekaboo, São Paulo Beim Movimentos Dance Company at Wolfsburg Festival (Music: Benjamin Britten, Finnish choral music)
- On Velvet, Stuttgart Ballet (Music: Johannes Maria Staud, Edward Elgar)
- I found A Fox II, Gauthier Dance (Solo. Music: Kate Bush)

2014

- Hello Earth, Nederlands Dans Theatre I (Music: Benjamin Britten, Diamanda Galás)
- Deer Vision, Zurich Ballet (Music: Chris Haigh, Rob Silverman, Arnold Schoenberg)
- Sigh, Les Ballets de Monte Carlo (Music: Bonnie Prince Billy)

2015

- Thin Skin, Nederlands Dans Theatre I (Music: Patti Smith, Keith Jarrett)
- Cry Boy, Ballet of the Gärtnerplatztheater, Munich (Solo. Music: The Cure)
- Le Chant du Rossignol (new version), Stuttgart Ballet (music: Stravinsky)
- Lonesome George, Ballet on the Rhine (Music: Shostakovich)
- Black Swan Pas de deux und Valse, Princess Grace Academy, Monte Carlo (Music: Tchaikovsky)
- All Long Dem Day, Berlin State Ballet School (Music: Nina Simone)
- Greyhounds, Egon Madsen at Theaterhaus Stuttgart (Solo in play. Music: Jeff Buckley)

2016

- Lucid Dream, Stuttgart Ballet (Music: Gustav Mahler)
- Woke Up Blind, Nederlands Dans Theatre I (Music: Jeff Buckley)
- A Spell on Yo, John Cranko School, Stuttgart (Music: Nina Simone)
- Nijinski, Gauthier Dance, Theaterhaus Stuttgart (Music: Chopin, Debussy)
- Petrushka, Ballett Zürich (Music: Stravinsky)

2017

- Midnight Raga, Nederlands Dans Theatre II (Music: Ravi Shankar, Etta James)
- Dance/Jazz Fusion Vol. 2, Badenes/Robinson/Su/von Sternenfels, Theaterhaus Stuttgart (Music: Ferenc and Magnus Mehl Quartet)
- We tell each other dark things, Nederlands Dans Theatre II (Music: Schubert, Placebo, Alfred Schnittke)

2018

- Almost Blue, Stuttgart Ballet (Music: Etta James, Antony and the Johnsons)
- Hungarian Dance No. 1, Princess Grace Academy, Monte Carlo (Music: Brahms, as part of the Gala de l'Académie 2018)
- La Strada, Ballet of the Gärtnerplatztheater, Munich (full-length. music: Nino Rota)
- Infant Spirit, Gauthier Dance, Theaterhaus Stuttgart (Solo, Music: Antony and the Johnsons)
- Walk the Demon, Nederlands Dans Theatre (Solo, Music: Antony and the Johnsons, Pavel Haas, Pehr Henrik Nordgren)

2019

- Dogs Sleep Paris Opera Ballet (Music: Toru Takemitsu, Ravel, Sarah Vaughan)
- The Heart, Gauthier Dance, Theaterhaus Stuttgart (Music: Ferenc and Magnus Mehl Quartet, Macy Gray)
- Kunstkammer, NDT 1 and 2 (full-length. Choreographed with Sol León, Paul Lightfoot and Crystal Pite. Music: Purcell, Beethoven, Janis Joplin and others)

2020

- Kiss a Crow, Hanover State Ballet (Music: Kate Bush)
- Do you love Gershwin?, Gauthier Dance, Theaterhaus Stuttgart (full-length. music: George Gershwin)

2021

- The Lover (after Marguerite Duras), Hanover State Ballet (full-length. music: Vietnamese jazz, Unsuk Chin, Debussy, Ravel, Fauré, Chopin, Nadia Boulanger)
- The Big Crying, Nederlands Dans Theatre II (Music: Rorogwela, Electricity feat. Fire Eater, Extreme Music from Africa, Tori Amos)
- Good Old Moone, Dresden Frankfurt Dance Company (Music: Patti Smith)
- Nightmare, Stuttgart Ballet (Music: Keith Jarrett, Lady Gaga)
- Shara Nur, Gauthier Dance, Theaterhaus Stuttgart. (Music: Björk)
- Fly Paper Bird, Vienna State Ballet (Music: Mahler)

2022

- I love you, ghosts, Nederlands Dans Theatre I (Music: Harry Belafonte, Alberto Ginastera, Mieczyslaw Weinberg, Einojuhani Rautavaara)
- Sweet Bones' Melody, Bavarian State Ballet (Music: Unsuk Chin)
- Yesterday's Scars, Gauthier Dance, Stuttgar (Music: The Velvet Underground, Jesse Callaert)
- A Wild Story, Hannover State Ballet (full-length. Music: The Smashing Pumpkins, Jules Massenet, Erich Wolfgang Korngold, Ethel Smyth, Debbie Wiseman)

2023

- In the Dutch Mountains, Nederlands Dans Theatre II (full-length. Music: Bartók, Brahms, Nits, This Mortal Coil)
- Faith – Love – Hope, Hanover State Ballet
