= Eric Gauthier (dancer) =

Canadian dancer and musician (born 1977)

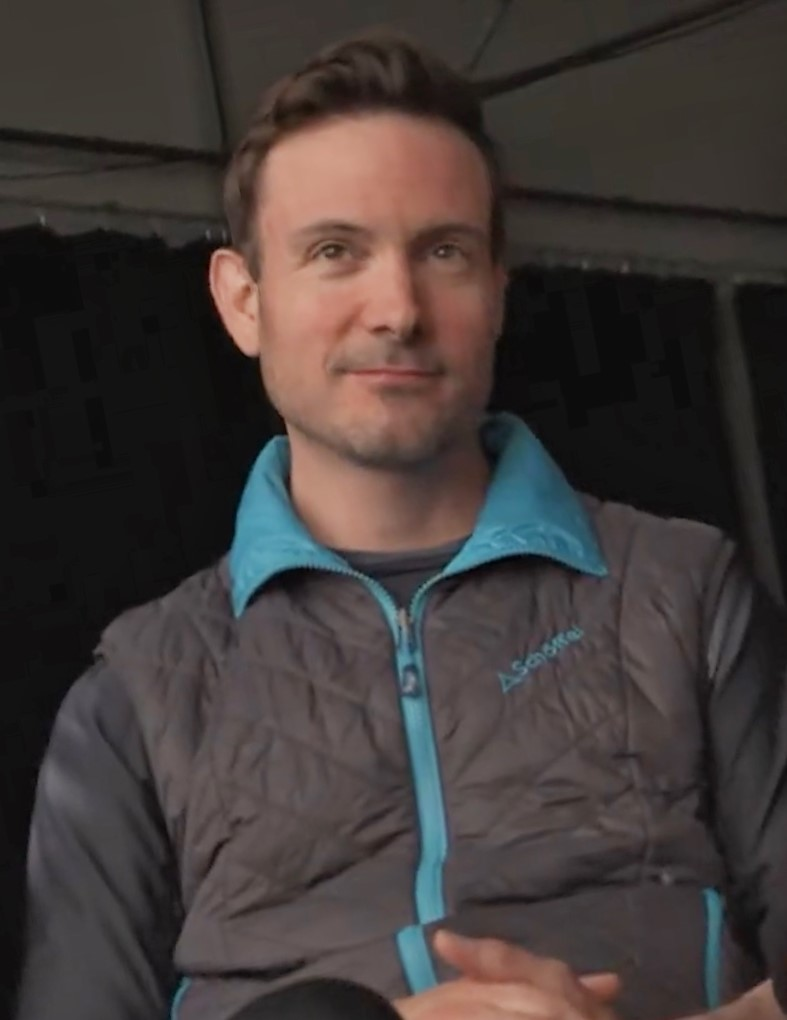
Gauthier on Regio TV Stuttgart in 2018

Eric Gauthier (dancer) (born 1977 in Montréal/Canada) is a classic and contemporary dancer, choreographer and musician. After a soloist career at the Stuttgart Ballet he founded Gauthier Dance/ /Dance Company at the Theaterhaus Stuttgart in 2007. In 2011, he won the German Dance Prize Deutscher Tanzpreis.

== Early life and education ==
Eric Gauthier was born in Montreal as son of Dr. Serge Gauthier, "a leading Alzheimer's researcher". He has said that "at first, all I wanted was to be a hockey player... a goalie to be exact. But then, when I was nine years old, I saw the musical Cats in Toronto and that’s when I decided I wanted to be a dancer."

Gauthier studied ballet at the school of Les Grands Ballets Canadiens in Montreal and at the National Ballet School in Toronto, where he also took music and voice lessons. In 1995, he became an apprentice with the National Ballet of Canada in Toronto under Reid Anderson (dancer). Gauthier credited Anderson as being the most influential person in his career and as his "Ballet Papa".

== Career ==
In 1996, Gauthier left Toronto for Germany, as Anderson became Director of the Stuttgart Ballet and joined him as a member of his group. In 2000, Gauthier was named demi-soloist, and in 2002 he was promoted to soloist. In 2005 he made his debut in choreography, in 2006 he created "Ballet 101" and in 2007, he created "Air Guitar".

In 2007, aged 30 years, he founded his own troupe, "Gauthier Dance/ /Dance Company", initially with 6 dancers and supported by the Theaterhaus Stuttgart. a construct that was unique in Germany.

In 2015, he started the biennial Stuttgart Dance festival, called COLOURS with open air interactive dances, which premiered from 25 June to 12 July 2015.

The troupe had their U.S. debut at the 2015 Jacob's Pillow Dance Festival. Their repertoire as of 2016 included 37 pieces.

== Reception, awards ==
The 2010 adaptation of the Monteverdi opera L'incoronazione di Poppea with choreography by Christian Spuck was compared to a Quentin Tarantino film, "...it just has style, and like his films the ballet was impeccably well made". In 2012/13, Gauthier was twice nominated as "Dancer of the Year" by German magazine "tanz" for the solo "I Found A Fox" which had been created for him.

In 2015, Gauthier received the "Medal of Merit of Baden-Württemberg" (Verdienstorden des Landes Baden-Württemberg).

== Personal life ==
Eric Gauthier has two sons and a daughter with his German wife Laura. In 2020 the couple announced their separation.
