= The Taming of the Shrew (ballet) =

1969 ballet in two acts choreographed by John Cranko

- Choreographer: John Cranko
- Music: Domenico Scarlatti, arranged by Kurt-Heinz Stolze
- Based on: The Taming of the Shrew by William Shakespeare
- Premiere: 16 March 1969; Staatsoper, Stuttgart
- Original ballet company: Stuttgart Ballet
- Design: Elisabeth Dalton
- Setting: Italy, 16th century

The Taming of the Shrew is a ballet in two acts choreographed by John Cranko to keyboard works by Domenico Scarlatti arranged and orchestrated by Kurt-Heinz Stolze. With scenery and costumes designed by Elizabeth Dalton, it was first presented as Der Widerspenstigen Zähmung by the Stuttgart Ballet at the Wṻrtembergische Staatstheater in Stuttgart on 16 March 1969.

== Background ==
Cranko's ballet is a dance version of William Shakespeare's play The Taming of the Shrew (1590–1592). The story is a comedy about Petruchio's determination to subdue the irascible Katherine; he woos her, marries her, and makes her an obedient wife. Shakespeare chose his title to signify to his audiences that the play was about the marriage of a man to an ill-tempered woman given to scolding, nagging, and aggression. Such a woman, especially a wife, was known in the sixteenth century as a shrew, so called after a tiny rodent with a notoriously hostile and unpleasant nature. A woman convicted in court for being a shrew was often punished in Shakespeare's day by being confined to stocks on the village green or repeatedly dunked in a nearby pond or lake.

== Scenario ==
The setting is Padua, a city in northern Italy, not far from Venice. Three suitors — Hortensio, Lucentio, and Gremio — come to Baptista's house to serenade Bianca, his younger daughter. Baptista declares that Bianca shall not marry until her older sister, Katherina, is wed. An ensuing rumpus is dispelled when Katherina angrily sends everyone packing. In a tavern, a tipsy Petruchio is robbed of his money. Hortensio, Lucentio, and Gremio offer to introduce him to an heiress. He accepts and determines to "wive it wealthily in Padua." At Baptista's house, Petruchio asks for Katherina's hand. After a stormy courtship, she agrees. Bianca's three suitors press their case. Bianca favors Lucentio. The first act culminates at Katherina and Petruchio's wedding, where he arrives late and behaves outrageously. He carries off his bride without waiting for the festivities to begin.

At Petruchio's house, the newly wedded couple are at supper, but he does not allow her to eat, protesting that the food is not good enough. She refuses to consummate the marriage and spends the night on the kitchen floor. Then, at a carnival, Lucentio tricks Hortensio and Gremio into marrying two ladies of the street, thus clearing his way to woo Bianca on his own. Petruchio's mockery and trickery continue to provoke Katherina. Eventually she surrenders, and they admit that they love each other. On the way to Bianca's wedding, Petruchio indulges in some whims, but Katherina has learned to humor him. At the wedding, Bianca treats her husband scornfully, but Katherina shows her how a wife is expected to behave. Left alone, she and Petruchio revel in their new-found love.

== Original cast ==
- Marcia Haydée – Katherina (Kate)
- Richard Cragun – Petruchio
- Susanne Hanke – Bianca
- Egon Madsen – Gremio
- Heinz Claus – Lucentio
- John Neumeier – Hortensio

== Critical reception ==
Cranko's ballet was an immediate success, with Richard Cragun winning particular acclaim for his performance as Petruchio. "Cragun was a strikingly handsome Petruchio, by turns self-mocking, overbearing, funny, and tender. The role suited his robustly masculine and charismatic stage personality and provided a first-class showcase for his virtuosity and partnering skills. A reviewer of an early performance in Stuttgart wrote, "I have been trying to think when—or whether—I ever laughed so much at a ballet as I did at John Cranko's The Taming of the Shrew. . . . Perhaps the subject sounds an unlikely one for dancing, but to think so is to leave out of account Cranko's absolute genius for comic invention."

== Video recordings ==
- 1983 (excerpt): The Stuttgart Ballet: The Miracle Lives, a video recording, includes an excerpt from The Taming of the Shrew, danced by Marcia Haydée and Richard Cragun (West Long Branch, N.J.: Kultur International Films Ltd., 1983).
- 1987 (excerpt): Ballerina, a BBC Television recording produced and directed by Derek Bailey (London: BBC TV, 1987), also includes an excerpt from the ballet but is currently not commercially available.
- 2022 (complete): Stuttgart Ballet with Elisa Badenes as Katherina, Jason Reilly as Petruchio, Veronika Verterich as Bianca, Martí Fernanández Paixà as Lucentio, Alessandro Giaquinto as Gremio, and Fabio Adorisio as Hortensio. Stuttgart State Orchestra, conducted by Wolfgang Heinz. Production director and ballet master: Krzysztof Nowogrodzki. Recorded live, Stuttgart Opera House, produced by Unitel. Available as streaming video on Carnegie Hall+, a single Blu-ray disc or as part of a set, John Cranko Stuttgart Ballet Collection.
