= Agrest =

Agrest is a surname. Notable people with the surname include:

- Diana Agrest (born 1945), US-Argentinian architect
- Evgeny Agrest (born 1966), Belarusian-Swedish chess grandmaster
- Matest M. Agrest (1915–2005), Russian ethnologist and mathematician
- Mikhail Agrest, Russian conductor

== Fictional ==
- Adrien Agreste and his father, Gabriel Agreste, from Miraculous: Tales of Ladybug & Cat Noir (French animated TV series)
