= Georgette Tsinguirides =

German ballet dancer

- Born: 27 February 1928; Stuttgart, Germany
- Occupations: Ballet dancer; Ballet mistress; Choreologist
- Years active: 1945–
- Organizations: Stuttgart Ballet
- Awards: John Cranko Prize; Order of Merit of Germany; Deutscher Tanzpreis; Member of the Royal Academy of Dance

Georgette Tsinguirides (born 27 February 1928) is a ballet dancer, ballet mistress and choreologist. She was the assistant of John Cranko at the Stuttgart Ballet and became in 1966 the first choreologist in Germany. Still active in 2015 after 70 years with the Stuttgart Ballet, Tsinguirides has been teaching the works choreographed by Cranko and his successors to several generations of ballet companies internationally.

== Career ==
Born in Stuttgart, Tsinguirides began her ballet training at the ballet school of the Staatstheater Stuttgart. She continued her studies with Olga Preobrajenska at the Studio Wacker in Paris and at the Royal Ballet School in London. Tsinguirides was engaged at the Staatstheater Stuttgart in 1945 and was promoted to soloist in 1957 under ballet director Nicolas Beriozoff. In 1960 she performed in Der Pagodenprinz by John Cranko who later succeeded Beriozoff as director in 1961. She performed in The Lady and the Fool, and in Romeo und Julia.

Cranko sent her to study the Benesh Movement Notation in London, which she completed in 1966. The notation, which shows movements of head, shoulders, hips, knees and feet on five lines similar to music notation, is according to experts still the most precise representation of ballet even in the time of video, offering also the possibility of synchronization with the music. Tsinguirides became the first choreologist in Germany in 1966, and preserved all major ballets by Cranko, and later Kenneth MacMillan, and others. She has been teaching these works several generations of ballet companies internationally, working with 45 ballet groups.

== Awards ==
- 1973 "Fellowship of Institute of Choreology" of the Benesh Institute of Choreology
- 1980 John Cranko Prize
- 1986 Order of Merit of the Federal Republic of Germany
- 2002 Order of Merit of Baden-Württemberg
- 2006 Honorary member of the Staatstheater Stuttgart
- 2010 Deutscher Tanzpreis
- 2010 Member of the Royal Academy of Dance
