= Reid Anderson (dancer) =

Canadian ballet dancer

Reid Bryce Anderson (born 1 April 1949) is a Canadian ballet dancer, ballet director and artistic director. He danced with the Stuttgart Ballet before returning as artistic director of the National Ballet of Canada in 1987. He returned to the Stuttgart Ballet as artistic director in 1996 and stepped down in 2018.

== Biography ==
=== Early life and training ===
Reid Anderson was born at New Westminster, British Columbia on 1 April 1949. He received his dance training at Dolores Kirkwood Academy and transferred to the Banff Centre. He then went to London in 1967 to study at the Royal Ballet School.

=== Dance career ===
Anderson began his dance career at the Royal Opera Ballet but was unhappy as a performer. In 1969, Anderson joined the Stuttgart Ballet as they were preparing for a two-week performance schedule in New York. His first piece with the company was Onegin. Shortly afterwards he became a principal dancer and was their ballet master from 1982 to 1986.

=== Return to Canada ===
In 1987, Anderson became co-artistic director of Ballet British Columbia, and later became the sole director. He was known for introducing a contemporary image to the company and increasing its reputation across Canada.

Anderson staged a remount of Onegin with the National Ballet of Canada. He became the director, and eventually artistic director, of the National Ballet of Canada in 1989. Anderson sustained the company during a tough economic recession by choreographing traditional ballet pieces and bringing Canadian and international choreographers to create new contemporary pieces. He occasionally danced in various character roles during these productions.

In 1994, he proposed that the board of directors promote Chan-hon Goh as the company's first Chinese Canadian principal dancer. He left the National Ballet of Canada in 1995, citing continued funding cuts from the government. Anderson had trained Eric Gauthier, who joined him as a member of his ensemble when he became Director of the Stuttgart Ballet.

=== Return to Stuttgart ===
Anderson returned to Stuttgart Ballet in 1996 as artistic director. He organised the company's tour to New York in 1998. After 22 Years, Reid Anderson Stepped Down from Stuttgart Ballet in 2018.

== Awards ==
In 1995, the Stuttgart Ballet awarded Anderson the John Cranko Award. He won the 2006 Deutscher Tanzpreis (German Dance Prize) in recognition of his work to improve dance in Germany, and in 2009 won the Order of Merit of Baden-Württemberg.
