= Isabelle Schad =

German dancer and choreographer (born 1970)

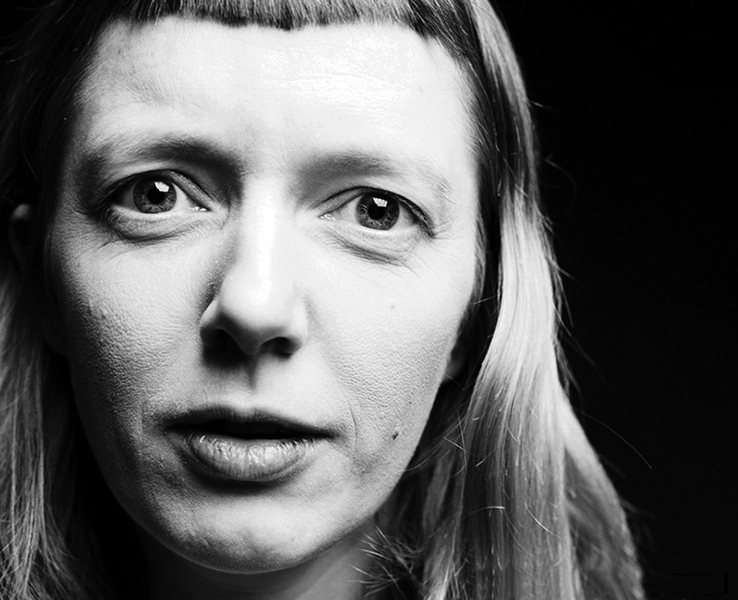
Isabelle Schad

Isabelle Schad (born 21 April 1970) is a German dancer and choreographer.

== Biography ==
Schad was born in Stuttgart and studied ballet there from 1981 to 1990. She then danced for six years in various ballet companies before becoming a member of Ultima Vez (Wim Vandekeybus) in Brussels and working with choreographers such as Olga Mesa, Angela Guerreiro, Felix Ruckert and Eszter Salamon. Since 1999 she has choreographed her own work.

Schad has initiated several projects/artist groups/work structures such as Good Work, Praticable and Wiesen55 e.V. In 2003 she initiated the series Good Work with Bruno Pocheron and Ben Anderson, and developed various pieces with Manuel Pelmus, Frédéric Gies, Hanna Hedman and others. In 2005, with Alice Chauchat, Frédéric Gies, Frédéric de Carlo and Odile Seitz, she originated an open collective called Praticable, within which a specific model of dance and choreographic collaboration is practiced. Schad is co-founder of the Verein Wiesen 55, a group of artists active in the areas of choreography, dance, lighting design, sculpture and multimedia. Together they operate the production site Wiesenburg-Halle.

Schad was a member of the jury at the International Choreographic Competition in Sofia and a mentor at DanceWeb 2011 and PAP 2016–19, and has been an artist in residence at the Podewil/TanzWerkstatt Berlin, Espace Pier Paolo Pasolini, Monty Antwerp and Rimbun Dahan Malaysia.

Schad teaches at Berlin’s inter-university dance centre HZT, in Cologne, Helsinki and Stockholm, and around the world in workshops or short projects organised by the Goethe-Institut and followed by performances, for example in Kigali (RW), San Francisco (USA), Bogota (CO), Lagos (NG), Kuala Lumpur (MY).

She understands learning and teaching as a circulating unity that she has shared for years with a ‘core’ of dancers, who thus participate in her own learning process. Physical praxis, training and choreographic work are related to one another and made communicable in a format developed by her known as Open Practice Sessions (OPS).

Schad has received awards such as Hope of the Year, Choreographer of the Year, and a tribute to her outstanding artistic development in contemporary dance at the 2019 German Dance Prize.

== Artistic practice and style ==
Schad works at the interface of dance, performance and visual art, with a central fascination for group formation and the ensemble. Interests such as community in dance or collective bodies are deeply rooted in her movement research. Bodies and movements are examined in terms of their materiality, processuality and experienceability. Physical praxis is seen as a place of learning, community and political participation. Schad orients her work to somatic bodywork such as Body-Mind Centering. She was decisively influenced by an embryology workshop with Bonnie Bainbridge Cohen.

She is a shiatsu practitioner, and has practiced aikido zen since 2014. These form the basis of her qi training together with Asian kinetic teachings such as meridian work and qigong. Western and Eastern practices and ways of thinking are also reflected in her solo and group works. She is concerned with the formation of communities in dance and formulates the body as a place of resistance so as to investigate norms, competition, discipline, conformity and the status of collective processes.

Schad has collaborated for many years with the visual artist Laurent Goldring. Together they developed the concept of the ‘amplifier’, which functions as a transition between the inner and the outer worlds.

== Projects and works (selection) ==
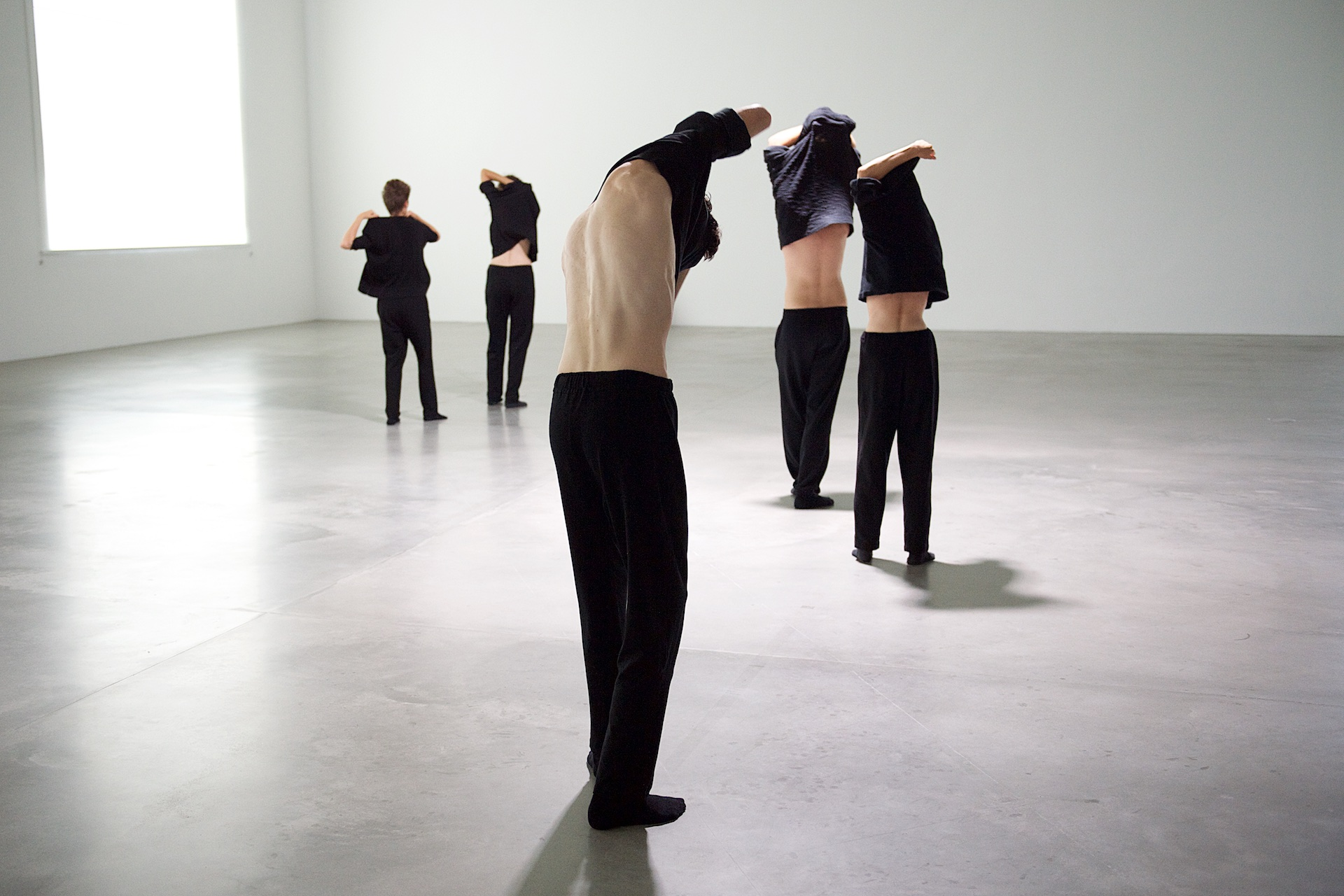
Inside Out Kindl Museum Berlin

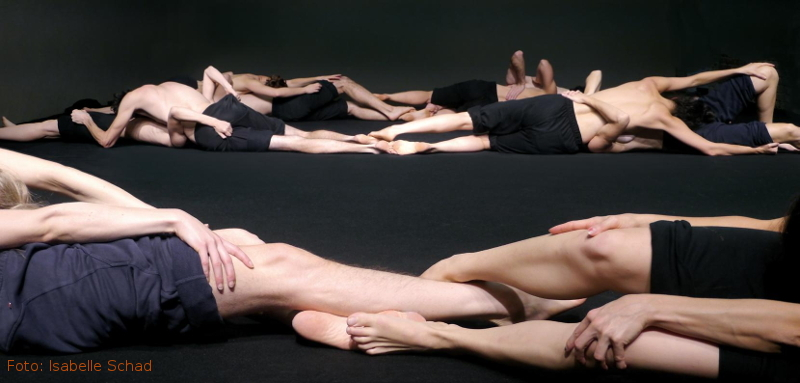
Pieces and Elements

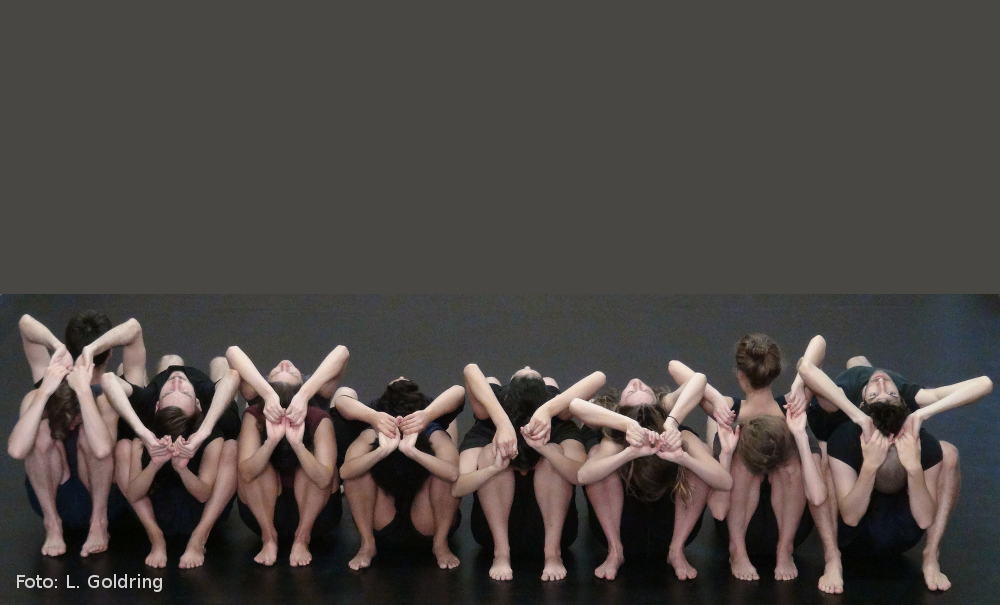
Collective Jumps

In 2007 Schad headed the mentoring project Tanztage Berlin. She also created Bach, for two dancers, which was taken into the repertoire of the Red House Sofia, and her solo Ohne Worte (Praticable). Since 2008 she has collaborated with Laurent Goldring on the project Unturtled #1–4. She also initiated community projects, including Tüddeldüddel-Lüd, in Hamburg, which was revived for the Tanzkongress 2009.

In 2010 and 2011 she developed the group pieces Glazba (Praticable) and Musik (Praticable), each for 14 dancers, Communicare for 25 dancers in Lima, Experience # 0.1 for 20 dancers in Bogota and Experience # 0.2 for 10 dancers in Lagos. In 2011/12 she developed Experience # 0.3 for three Bulgarian dancers, a collaboration with the Goethe-Institut Sofia.

In her choreographic group work Experience#1, Schad explored the connections between inward and outward embryonal development patterns in their space-time conditions. The piece was seen at the Tanznacht Berlin in August 2012 and at Serralves, Porto, in 2013. Schad developed a choreography for K3 in Hamburg as part of the project heute: Volkstanzen in 2013.

2012 and 2013 saw the premieres of the solo projects Der Bau in Valenciennes and Form und Masse in Berlin. Der Bau, a collaboration with Laurent Goldring, has been on tour worldwide since then and was invited to the Tanzplattform 2014. Still Lives and an extract from Ohne Worte (Praticable) were invited to the Internationale Tanzplattform Deutschland in Hanover in 2008, and California Roll to the Tanzplattform in Stuttgart in 2006.

In 2014 Schad choreographed the group piece Der Bau–Gruppe, for twelve performers, in collaboration with the Croatian director Sasa Bozic and the visual artist Laurent Goldring. The piece was performed in a version for children at the Purple Tanzfestival and the Junges Tanzhaus NRW in 2019. In 2014 the group choreography Collective Jumps was premiered at the Hebbel am Ufer (HAU), in Berlin, and in a local version in Poznań, followed by further local versions at Kampnagel in Hamburg, the Deutsches Kulturinstitut in Timișoara (Romania), the Venice Biennale 2016 (link) and elsewhere. The retrospective On Visibility and Amplifications, at the HAU, was an extensive presentation of the artistic collaboration between Isabelle Schad and Laurent Goldring. The solo Fugen was premiered at the same theatre in 2015 and subsequently shown at Moving in November in Helsinki, the NEXT Festival in Valenciennes and other venues.

In 2016 Schad’s group work Pieces and Elements was first performed at the Hebbel am Ufer, and was also shown at the Pact-Zollverein in Essen and the Berlinische Galerie. In 2017 Schad created the two portraits Double Portrait and Turning Solo. Her performative exhibition INSIDE OUT was premiered at Tanz im August Berlin 2018. Her trilogy on collective bodies was completed with the first performance of Reflection (HAU1 Berlin).
