= Stuttgart Ballet =

German ballet company

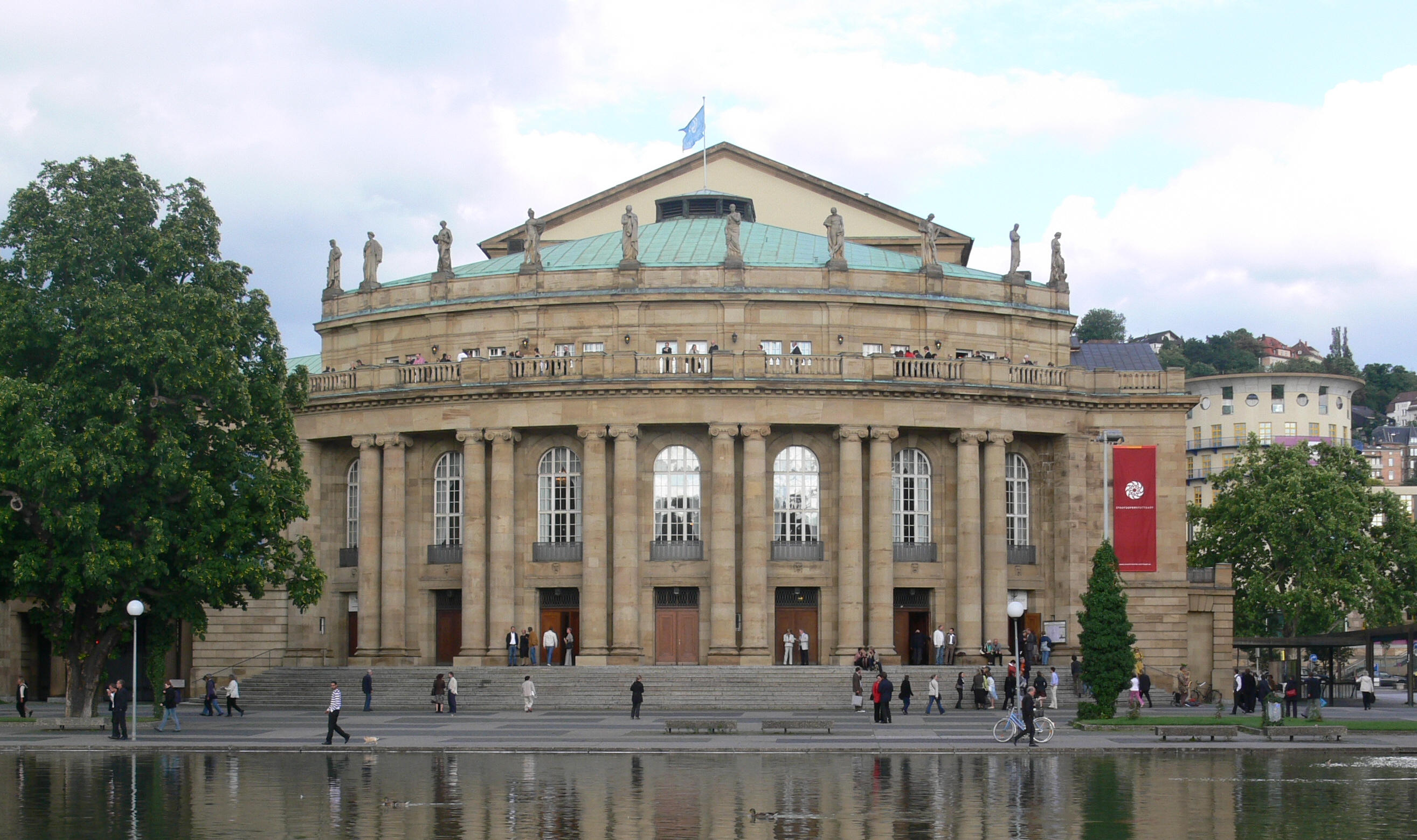
Staatsoper Stuttgart, home to the Stuttgart Ballet

Stuttgart Ballet is a German ballet company. Dating to 1609 with the court ballet of the dukes of Württemberg, the modern company was begun under John Cranko (1927-1973). It is known for full-length narrative ballets. The company received the Laurence Olivier Award for Outstanding Achievement in Dance in 1981.

== History ==
The Stuttgart Ballet can be traced to the ballet of the Duke's court of 1609. The "sing-ballette" flourished later in that century under Jacques Courcelles.

=== Noverre (18th century) ===
In 1759 Duke Carl Eugen invited Jean-Georges Noverre to come to Stuttgart and be well-rewarded as resident balletmaster. Noverre was widely known as a ballet reformer, and as a dancer and choreographer. He increased the ducal ballet company to 7 female and 7 male principal dancers and 42 figueants (21 female and 21 male). "During his stay the most famous dancers appeared regularly as guests" of the Duke. These included Gaetano Vestris, Maximilien Gardel, Jean Dauberval, and Anna Heinel (making her debut). Noverre while in Stuttgart "created some of his best ballets".

In 1763 Noverre wrote Médée et Jason (music by Rodolphe) for the Duke's birthday. The ballet was "a freestanding entr'acte entertainment" following Italian tradition, "not a divertissement woven into an opera in the French style". The 35-minute dance "taut, bloody, and tragic" told its gruesome drama. In 1766 Noverre left for Vienna. The local ballet company continued in Stuttgart though at a much smaller scale. In 1771 a Ducal Ballet School opened, which functioned until 1794.

=== Taglioni (19th century) ===
In their peregrinations, the esteemed Filippo Taglioni and his daughter Marie Taglioni made Stuttgart their home, 1824 to 1828. Their presence inspired a new era in the local ballet. Its major production was in 1826: their original version of the narrative ballet Jocko ou le Singe du Brésil, also called Danina. After 33 performances over two seasons in Stuttgart, "it traveled around the world". Jocko in its several versions was said to be "the most successful ballet production of this period".

In Stuttgart during the following decades "the city satisfied its ballet needs" by hosting visiting companies. Yet "the Court Theater always maintained a small group [of dancers] for its opera". An 1891 production of the Austrian ballet The Fairy Doll was 'uniquely' successful.

=== Cranko (20th century) ===
Of Oskar Schlemmer's abstract creation Triadisches Ballett, with music "ranging from Haydn to Debussy", its premiere with complete choreography was held at the Landes Theater in Stuttgart in 1922.

In 1956 the Lithuanian Nicholas Beriozoff, formerly of Ballet Russe, arrived in Stuttgart. Serving as balletmaster 1957-1960, Beriozoff "created a special local ballet climate". His "productions of the classcs laid the foundations for the remarkable progress made by the Ballet... under Cranko".

In 1961 the modern company Stuttgart Ballet was begun by John Cranko, a choreographer from Britain born in South Africa. He "laid great emphasis on improvement of the technical standards of the company". Cranko helped gather, then guided and shaped an ensemble of independent-minded dancers, forming them into a coherent stage act. They performed "with an exciting and visually arresting style". Cranko created full-length narrative ballets including Romeo and Juliet, Onegin and The Taming of the Shrew. These ballets stayed in the repertoire at Stuttgart and eventually spread to other stages "in companies around the world". Refashioned and invigorated Stuttgart Ballet's first tour to America in 1969 was a success, acquiering it increased international recognition.

Marcia Haydée was the prima ballerina under Cranko. Dancers who have emerged from the company to become well-known choreographers include: John Neumeier, William Forsythe, Foofwa d'Imobilité, Uwe Scholz, Jiří Kylián and Renato Zanella. A colleague of Cranko was the Scottish choreographer Kenneth MacMillan (1929-1992) of the Royal Ballet in London. MacMillan did work in Stuttgart.

The company received the Laurence Olivier Award for Outstanding Achievement in Dance in 1981.

=== 21st century ===
Cranko (1927-1973) was succeeded as director by Glen Tetley 1974–1976, Marcia Haydée 1976–1996, followed by Reid Anderson 1996-2018, then by Tamas Detrich 2018 to present.

For more than 25 years James Tuggle was the principal conductor of the Stuttgart Ballet music. From 2019 through 2021 Mikhail Agrest was principal conductor.

The ballet's school is the John Cranko Schule. The choreologist Georgette Tsinguirides has recorded all major ballets by Cranko and Kenneth MacMillan in Benesh Movement Notation and has been teaching these works to several generations of ballet companies internationally.

Within Germany "the Stuttgart Ballet remained the leading classical company".

== The company ==
Ensemble 2025/2026

=== Principal dancers ===
*Principal Guest Artist

| Name | Nationality | Training | Other companies (inc. guest performances) |
|---|---|---|---|
| Rocio Aleman | Mexico | Escuela superior de Música y Danza de Monterrey John Cranko School | |
| Elisa Badenes | Spain | Conservatorio Profesional de Danza de Valencia Royal Ballet School | |
| Mackenzie Brown* | United States | Barton & Williams School of Classical Dance Classical Ballet of Fredericksburg Académie de Danse Classique Princesse Grace, Monaco | |
| Henrik Erikson | Hong Kong Switzerland | Zürich Opera House Ballet School John Cranko School | Cuban National Ballet Norwegian National Ballet Paris Opera Ballet |
| Gabriel Figueredo | Brazil | Andanças de Rita Candemil, Taquara Pavilhão D, São Paulo John Cranko School | |
| Miriam Kacerova | Slovakia | Bratislava Dance Conservatory Académie de Danse Classique Princesse Grace, Monaco | Ballett Zürich |
| Matteo Miccini | Italy | Ballet Centre Florence John Cranko School | |
| David Moore | United Kingdom | Angela Rowe School of Dance Royal Ballet School | |
| Anna Osadcenko | Kazakhstan | Academie A. B. Selesnew John Cranko School | |
| Martí Paixà | Spain | John Cranko School | |
| Jason Reilly | Canada | Canada's National Ballet School | The Royal Ballet National Ballet of Canada |
| Daiana Ruiz | Argentina | Sleeping Beauty Institute Teatro Colón | Ballet del Teatro Argentino |
| Adhonay Soares | Brazil | Centro Cultural Gustav Ritter, Goiâna CEP em Artes Brasilieu Franca John Cranko School | |
| Friedemann Vogel | Germany | John Cranko School Académie de Danse Classique Princesse Grace, Monaco | Mikhailovsky Ballet |

=== Soloists ===
- Mizuki Amemiya
- Diana Ionescu
- Veronika Verterich
- Abigail Willson-Heisel
- Fabio Adorisio
- Ciro Ernesto Mansilla
- Martino Semenzato
- Satchel Tanner

=== Demi-soloists ===
- Priscylla Gallo
- Vittoria Girelli
- Aiara Iturrioz Rico
- Fernanda Lopes
- Aoi Sawano
- Ruth Schultz
- Alicia Torronteras
- Irene Yang
- Riccardo Ferlito
- Lassi Hirvonen
- Christopher Kunzelmann
- Adrian Oldenburger
- Dorian Plasse
- Edoardo Sartori
- Daniele Silingardi

=== Corps de ballet ===
- Ava Arbuckle
- María Andrés Betoret
- Lily Babbage
- Katharina Buck
- Elisabetta Fasoglio
- Julliane Franzoi
- Farrah Hirsch
- Eva Holland-Nell
- Annalee Melton
- Florencia Paez
- Paula Rezende
- Joana Romaneiro Kirn
- Natalie Thornley-Hall
- Noan Alves
- Emanuele Babici
- Jamie Constance
- Joaquin Gaubeca
- Macéo Gérard
- Peter Hull
- Leon Metelsky
- Mitchel Millhollin
- James Platts
- Anton Tcherny
- Vincent Travnicek
- Serhii Zharikov

=== Apprentices ===
- Sonja Bräunl
- Anya Donaghy
- Annabelle McCarthy
- Isabela Souza
- Doga Taskaya
- Edoardo Maria Russo
- Carter Smalling
- Carlos Strasser

=== Character artists ===
- Angelika Bulfinsky
- Magdalena Dziegielewska
- Sonia Santiago
- Matteo Crockard-Villa
- Rolando D'Alesio
- Clemens Frölich
- Marc Ribaud

=== Artist-in-residence ===
- Roman Novitzky

== Notable people ==
- Mikhail Agrest
- Alicia Amatriain
- Reid Anderson
- Elisa Badenes
- Ray Barra
- Bridget Breiner
- Daniel Camargo
- Richard Cragun
- John Cranko
- Foofwa d'Imobilité
- William Forsythe
- Marco Goecke
- Marcia Haydée
- Kang Sue-jin
- Birgit Keil
- Jiří Kylián
- Nora Kimball
- Vladimir Malakhov
- Egon Madsen
- Evan McKie
- John Neumeier
- Sonia Santiago
- Uwe Scholz
- Tristan Simpson
- Christian Spuck
- Glen Tetley
- Georgette Tsinguirides
- Friedemann Vogel
- Madeline Woo
- Renato Zanella

== Bibliography ==
- Robert Greskovic, Ballet. A complete guide (London: Robert Hale 1998)
- John Gruen, The Private World of Ballet (New York: The Viking Press 1975; Penguin 1976).
- Jennifer Homans, Apollo's Angels. A history of ballet (New York: Random House 2010).
- Horst Koegler, Concise Oxford Dictionary of Ballet (Oxford University 1977). Original edition: Friedrichs Ballettlexikon (Hannover: Friedrich Verlag 1972).
- Nancy Reynolds & Malcolm McCormick, No Fixed Points. Dance in the Twentieth Century (Yale Univ. 2003).

== See also ==
- List of productions of Swan Lake derived from its 1895 revival
