= Friedemann Vogel =

German ballet dancer

- Born: 1 August 1979 (age 47); Stuttgart, Germany
- Education: Princess Grace Academy of Classical Dance
- Occupation: Ballet dancer
- Title: Kammertänzer and Principal Dancer, Stuttgart Ballet
- Website: friedemannvogel.com

Friedemann Vogel (born 1 August 1979) is a German ballet dancer who performs with the Stuttgart Ballet as a Principal dancer and as a frequent guest artist at major ballet companies around the world including La Scala Theatre Ballet in Milan and the Bolshoi Ballet in Moscow. He has been awarded several prestigious dance prizes including the Prix de Lausanne (1997), Prix de Luxembourg (1997), Eurocity Competition in Italy, USA International Ballet Competition (1998) and Erik Bruhn Prize (2002). In September 2015, he was awarded the national title Kammertänzer – the highest honor in Germany that can be bestowed on a dancer. In the following year, 2016, he was awarded the "Prix Maya" for "Outstanding Dancer" alongside Aurélie Dupont and Diana Vishneva. In 2019, he was elected "Dancer of the Year" by the prestigious trade journal TANZ, making him the only male dancer worldwide ever to receive this distinction more than once. In 2020, he was honoured with the "Outstanding Performer" Award by the prestigious German Dance Prize for his longstanding and illustrious international career, and as a unique dance interpreter, with his combination of intense emotional portrayals and excellent technique. In 2021, he was selected to give the official International Dance Day message by the International Theatre Institute – the world's largest performing arts organisation, under the patronage of UNESCO. In 2022, Friedemann was appointed jury member of the prestigious Prix de Lausanne, 25 years after he was a prize winner himself.

The first-ever full-length documentary on Vogel, "Friedemann Vogel – Verkörperung des Tanzes", made its TV premiere on German TV channel SWR on 10 April 2020. Friedemann is also featured as one of four protagonists in the ZDF/ARTE documentary "Dance on!" which premiered on ARTE on 20 November 2022.

== Early life and training ==
Vogel was born in Stuttgart, Germany. He studied at John Cranko Schule in Stuttgart. After receiving the John Gilpin Scholarship from Princess Antoinette de Monaco, he completed his ballet training at Princess Grace Academy of Classical Dance in Monte Carlo.

== Career ==
Vogel embarked on his professional dance career with the Stuttgart Ballet in September 1998 as a member of the corps de ballet. In 1997 to 1998, he won the cash prize from the Prix de Lausanne (1997), Gold Medal from Prix de Luxembourg (1997), Gold Medal from Eurocity Competition in Italy (1997) and Bronze from USA International Ballet Competition (1998). In 2002, Vogel won the Erik Bruhn Prize with the pas de deux from "In the Middle, Somewhat Elevated", a coveted prize awarded to dancers known to have "technical ability, artistic achievement and dedication". In the same year he won the Erik Bruhn Prize, Vogel was promoted to a Principal Dancer in the Stuttgart Ballet where he performs the leading role for many well-known ballets such as Romeo and Juliet, Giselle, Swan Lake, Sleeping Beauty, La Bayadere, Raymonda, Onegin, The Lady of the Camellias, Mayerling and Boléro. Besides regularly headlining ballet galas around the world, Vogel has also been invited to perform as guest artist by the following companies (in alphabetical order):

- Ballets de Santiago de Chile
- Bayerisches Staatsballett
- Béjart Ballet Lausanne
- Bolshoi Ballet Theatre Moscow
- English National Ballet
- Finnish National Ballet
- Hong Kong Ballet
- Korean National Ballet
- Mariinsky Theater St.Petersburg
- National Ballet of China
- Royal Swedish Ballet
- Sarasota Ballet
- Staatsballett Berlin
- Teatro alla Scala Milano
- Teatro dell'Opera di Roma
- Tokyo Ballet
- Vienna State Ballet

In 2015, Vogel was awarded by the Ministry of Science, Research and the Arts of the Federal State of Baden-Württemberg the national title of "Kammertänzer" — the highest honor in Germany for a dancer. In the following year, 2016, he was awarded the "Prix Maya" for "Outstanding Dancer" alongside Aurélie Dupont and Diana Vishneva. In 2019, he was elected "Dancer of the Year" by the international critics' survey of trade journal TANZ for the second time in his career. In 2020, he was honoured with the "Outstanding Performer" Award by the prestigious German Dance Prize for his longstanding and illustrious international career, and as a unique dance interpreter, with his combination of intense emotional portrayals and excellent technique. In 2021, he was appointed the Message Author for International Dance Day by the International Theatre Institute, which selects an outstanding personality each year to compose a message to celebrate dance in all its forms, and to transcend political and cultural boundaries through its universal language.

In 2019, Vogel launched the "Inspired by Porsche" campaign – a collaboration named "Creation of the Day" by leading German marketing & media journal W&V, which commended Porsche for their authentic choice of the ballet star as a "brand ambassador". The same campaign has won two "Awards of Excellence" in the Academy of Interactive & Visual Arts 2020 International Communicator Awards.

In 2020, in response to the pandemic, Friedemann Vogel launched "Physical Conversation" – a limited-edition art box developed in collaboration with photographer Oliver Kröning, of which all 300 boxes sold out with four days, and all proceeds were donated to the Olgäle Stiftung, a foundation supporting sick children in Stuttgart. In 2021, photos from "Physical Conversation" were presented in a special exhibition curated by the Galerie Kernweine in the garden museum of the StadtPalais Stuttgart from 9 May to 30 June. Nearly 10.000 Euros were raised in all for the Olgäle Stiftung.

In 2021, Friedemann Vogel made his choreographic debut with "Not in my hands". Created with former Stuttgart Ballet soloist Thomas Lempertz and performed to Mozart's "Requiem", the solo is Vogel's attempt to encapsulate the overwhelming impact of the pandemic on performing artists.

== Reception ==
In addition to being recognized for his dancing through many prestigious dance awards, Vogel was named "Outstanding Dancer" by the critics in the Ballettanz magazine in 2005 and 2009, as well as "Dancer of the Year" in 2010 and 2019 by the prestigious industry magazine Tanz, which described him as "a world star who never lost the ground beneath his feet... now at the top of his game". The Dance Europe magazine named Vogel "Outstanding Dancer" in 2010, Danza&Danza magazine named him "Best Male Dancer" in 2011 and he was given the award of "Best Male Dancer" by the Positano Premio la Danza – Leonide Massine in 2012. Described as "one of the most passionate and elegant male dancers on the international scene" by the Dance International Magazine, Vogel is widely acknowledged for his purity of movement and exceptional versatility, critically acclaimed for his classical ballet roles and contemporary work alike. In particular, Vogel has received rave reviews for his interpretation of Maurice Béjart's Boléro ("Friedemann is kult." – Cannstatter Zeitung), Kenneth MacMillan's Mayerling ("absolutely sensational" – Dance Europe, John Cranko's Onegin ("the most elegant & elegiac Onegin of all time" – Suedwest Presse). Ballet2000 further praised the superlative dancer for "allying physical and technical control with a deep, sensitive artistry". For his 20th anniversary with the Stuttgart Ballet in 2019, Stuttgarter Zeitung interviewed Vogel, who "conquered the world of ballet from Stuttgart".

Vogel's collaboration with Rome Opera Ballet and Christian Dior in Italy and worldwide, as part of the lead couple in the new ballet Nuit Blanche choreographed by Sébastien Bertaud, and wearing a costume specially designed for him by Dior's artistic director Maria Grazia Chiuri.

"Fascinating Movement" – the Inspired by Porsche campaign that Vogel launched in May 2019 – was named "Creation of the Day" by leading German marketing & media journal W&V. In 2020, in response to the global COVID-19 pandemic, Vogel taught a voluntary virtual ballet improvisation class with choreographer Sébastien Bertaud as part of the "Dior & Dance" initiative, to encourage dancers to keep up with their training from home and to offer the public a glimpse of the daily life of professional dancers. The video received much positive response from the dance sector, and has been publicised online widely by fashion and lifestyle magazines from around the world.

The British Theatre Guide singled out Vogel as the "standout one" and that he "soars like a bird" in his Tristesse performance. He was also lauded by Debra Craine of The Times for his performance in Tristesse: "All performers were outstanding, but Vogel in particular lifted Tristesse on to another plane with the sheer beauty and heart of his dancing." A New York Times dance reviewer named Vogel as a "handsome, appealing, tall dancer whom I hope New York comes to know better" for his performance in Marguerite and Armand.

Several dance blogs have also praised Vogel: Dancetabs commended Vogel for being a "beautiful, lyrical, light, clean dancer" and that the pas de deux was a "poignant moment" in Tristesse. Artmeme praised Vogel for his "noteworthy and outstanding presence on stage" and called him an "exquisite German dancer".

His performances as Des Grieux in Kenneth MacMillan's Manon together with Eleonora Abbagnato and Rome Opera Ballet were highly anticipated and celebrated by both public and press. Italian newspapers applauded Friedemann Vogel for being an "extraordinary performer": "His heart meets that of the young Des Grieux: marvelous in the first solo, Friedemann Vogel is here (...) a dancer with a crystalline technique and an elegant gesture, a poet in love capable of suspending time in poses with perfect aplomb and twirling with velvety élan." Italian TV coverage of his guest performances show the great reception Vogel has received for his interpretation.

Amongst the 40 international ballet stars participating in the 15th World Ballet Festival in Japan, Friedemann Vogel was the only one invited to be interviewed by Japanese TV Channel NHK on the programme "Gogo Nama" to promote the event, a testament to the great popularity he enjoys in Asia and especially in Japan. Vogel was also voted one of the most popular ballet dancers in Japan in 2019 by the audience survey of Dance Magazine Japan.

Vogel continues to gain the attention of international dance, travel and fashion media in Germany, Italy, Russia, China, Japan, Korea, United States of America, United Kingdom, Singapore Taiwan, Hong Kong, and France.

== List of ballets/roles performed ==
The following table lists the productions Vogel is the lead dancer:

Production	Choreographer	Role
Afternoon of a Faun	Jerome Robbins	Leading
Apollo	George Balanchine	Apollo
Ballet Imperial	George Balanchine	Leading
Bella Figura	Jiří Kylián	Pas de deux
Boléro	Maurice Béjart	Leading
Dances at a Gathering	Jerome Robbins	Role in Green
Diamonds	George Balanchine	Leading
Edward II	David Bintley	Edward II
Forgotten Land	Jiří Kylián	White
Fratres	John Neumeier	Leading
Gaîté Parisienne	Maurice Béjart	Pas de deux "The Lovers"
Giselle	Production: Reid Anderson, Valentina Savina, Patrice Bart, Yvette Chauviré	Duke Albrecht
Grand Pas Classique	Daniel Auber	Leading
Herman Schmerman	William Forsythe	Leading
In The Middle, Somewhat Elevated	William Forsythe	Leading
Initials R.M.B.E	John Cranko	Leading
Kaash	Akram Khan	Leading
Kazimir's Colours	Mauro Bigonzetti	Leading
La Bayadère	Natalia Makarova	Solar
La fille mal gardée	Sir Frederick Ashton	Colas
La Sylphide	Peter Schaufuss, Erik Bruhn after August Bournonville	James
Legende	John Cranko	Leading
Les Sylphides	Michail Fokine	Poet
Marguerite and Armand	Frederick Ashton	Armand
Manon	Kenneth MacMillan	Des Grieux
Mayerling	Kenneth MacMillan	Crown Prince Rudolf
Nachtmerrie	Marco Goecke	Leading
Onegin	John Cranko	Onegin and Lenski
One of a Kind	Jiri Kylian	
Poème de l'extase	John Cranko	Lead boy in love
Raymonde 3 Act	Rudolf Nureyev	Jean de Brienne
Ricercare	Glen Tetley	Leading
Romeo and Juliet	John Cranko, Kenneth MacMillan, Derek Deane	Romeo
Slice to Sharp	Jorma Elo	Leading
Songs of a wayfarer	Maurice Béjart	Nureyev
Stravinsky Violin Concerto	George Balanchine	Leading
Swan Lake	John Cranko, Derek Deane, Yuri Grigorovich, Rudolf Nureyev, Asaf Messerer	Prince Siegfried
Symphony in C	Balanchine	1st movement
The Dream	Frederick Ashton	Oberon
The Four Temperaments	George Balanchine	Sanguinic
The Lady and the Fool	John Cranko	Moondog, Prince
The Lady of the Camellias	John Neumeier	Armand Duval and Graf N.
The Sleeping Beauty	Márcia Haydée after Marius Petipa	Prince Désiré
The Song of the Earth	Kenneth MacMillan	Messenger of Death
Theme and Variations	George Balanchine	Leading
Voluntaries	Glen Tetley	Pas de trois
Was Bleibet	Alessandro Giaquinto	Leading

The following table lists roles specially created for Vogel:

Production	Choreographer	Role
Adagio Assai	Bridged Brenner	
Aurora's Nap	Johan Inger	Prince Désiré
Cadavre Exquis	Guillaume Côté	Leading
Carlotta's Portrait	Christian Spuck	Leading
Copelia at Teatro alla Scala	Derek Deane	Franz
Einssein	Mauro Bigonzetti	
EDEN	Wayne McGregor	Male lead
Fancy Goods	Marco Goecke	Leading
Giselle	Irina Lukasova	Duke Albrecht
II Concertone	Mauro Bigonzetti	Leading
Le petit rien	Christian Spuck	Leading
Mona Lisa	Itzik Galil	Leading
nocturne	Christian Spuck	Leading
Not in my hands	Friedemann Vogel & Thomas Lempertz	Solo
The Nutcracker	Edward Klug	The Nutcracker/Drosselmeier's Nephew
Orlando	Marco Goecke	Leading
Raymonda at Teatri alla Scala	Sergej Vikharev	Jean de Brienne
Source	Edward Clug	
still.nest	Dominique Dumais	Leading
Strictly Gershwin	Derek Deane	Leading
Taiyō to Tsuki	Martin Schläpfer	
The Chambers of a Heart	Itzik Galil	Leading
The Firebird	Sidi Larbi Cherkaoui	Leading
The Shaking Tent	Marc Spradling	Leading
The Sleeping Beauty	Derek Deane, Cyntia Harvey	Prince Desiré
Tristesse for "Kings of the Dance"	Marcelo Gomes	Leading
Two Pieces of Matter against the Gravitational Force	Jean Christophe Blavier	Leading
Was Bleibet	Alessandro Giaquinto	Leading

== Awards ==
- 2020 "Outstanding Performer" Award of German Dance Prize
- 2016 "Prix Maya"
- 2015 "Kammertänzer" of Germany
- 2002 Erik Bruhn Prize
- 1998 Bronze in USA International Ballet Competition
- 1997 Gold Medal in Prix de Luxembourg
- 1997 Gold Medal in Eurocity Competition in Italy
- 1997 Cash Prize in Prix de Lausanne
