= Madeline Woo =

American ballet dancer (born 1998)

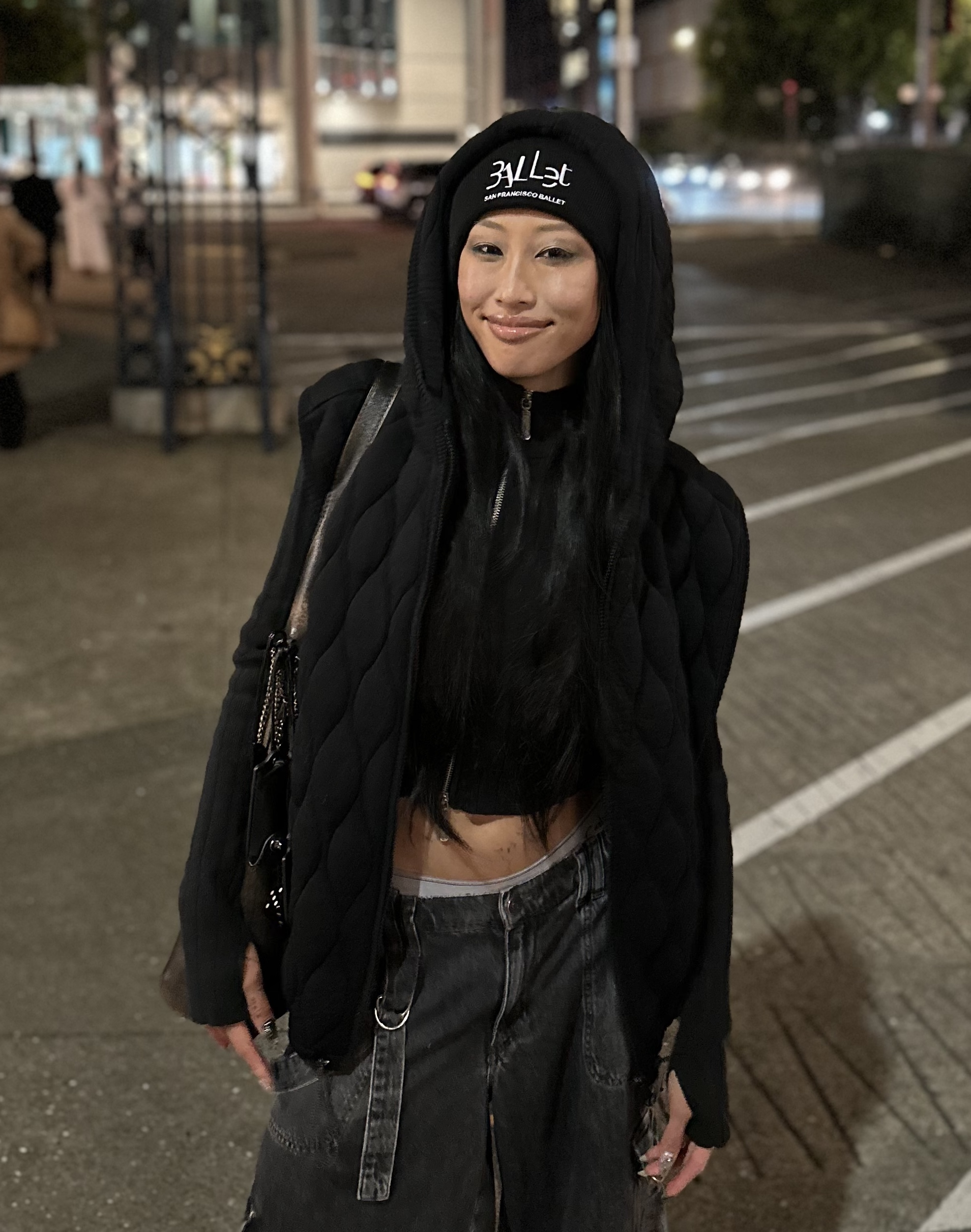
- Madeline Woo outside the War Memorial Opera House after a San Francisco Ballet performance
- Born: 1998 (age 27–28)
- Education: V and T Dance; John Cranko School
- Occupation: Ballet dancer
- Years active: 2017–present
- Career
- Current group: San Francisco Ballet
- Former groups: Royal Swedish Ballet
- Website: www.maddwoo.com

Madeline Woo (born 1998) is an American ballet dancer. Since 2025, she has been a principal dancer for the San Francisco Ballet, and was previously a principal dancer for the Royal Swedish Ballet. She is known for her deviation from traditional ballet dancer aesthetics and has founded her own fashion brand, Maddwoo Studios.

== Early life ==
Woo grew up in Huntington Beach, California, and in her youth, she trained at V and T Dance in Laguna Hills. While a freshman at Huntington Beach High School, Woo won the Los Angeles Regionals of the Youth America Grand Prix (YAGP) in 2014. She went on to reach the final round of the YAGP finals and earn a one year scholarship at the Stuttgart Ballet's John Cranko School. She qualified to compete in the Prix de Lausanne in 2015.

== Career ==
After graduating from the John Cranko School, Woo was not offered a position with the Stuttgart Ballet and auditioned for several other European companies, joining the Royal Swedish Ballet (RSB) in 2017. During the COVID-19 pandemic, she was promoted two ranks at once from the corps de ballet to first soloist. In 2022, she was promoted to principal. Both writing for Bachtrack, Graham Watts described her performance in Julia and Romeo (a retelling of Romeo and Juliet choreographed by Mats Ek) as an "enchanting and charismatic Julia", and Maggie Foyer, reviewing her performance in The Nutcracker, described her as a "dancer of huge vitality and charm".

In 2025, desiring to be closer to her family and to move on before becoming too comfortable, she departed the RSB to become a principal dancer for the San Francisco Ballet (SFB). Woo had danced in a 2022 production of Cinderella in the RSB choreographed by Tamara Rojo, who in turn would go on to become the SFB's artistic director late that year. Rojo described Woo as a natural hire for the SFB.

Writing for the San Francisco Chronicle, critic Rachel Howard described Woo's Spring 2026 season-opening performance of Stars and Stripes as having "space-devouring split jumps and saut de chat".

== Social media ==
Woo has an extensive social media following, particularly on Instagram, where she had about 421,000 followers as of March 11, 2026. She began to accumulate a large following, which partly motivated her decision to start her fashion brand, after her decision to get tattoos.

== Fashion ==
Woo has described herself as "that ballerina with the tattoos" and "rebellious" against traditional ballet aesthetics; having never felt fully comfortable in traditional ballet attire, she chose instead a "grungier" look. Tattoos have historically been considered taboo in ballet, and Woo covers hers for performances if required. Woo feared termination for getting her first tattoos that would be visible onstage and, for the subsequent month, covered them with long sleeves in the studio.

In 2024, while sidelined from an injury, Woo reflected on her future after ballet, and launched her fashion brand Maddwoo Studios in December 2025. Although Woo had already moved to San Francisco by that time, she chose to have the brand be based in Sweden due to that country's work-life balance and work culture. It was accepted into the programme of Stockholm Fashion Week 2026 in March 2026, leaving the brand only three months to put together a fashion show for the event.
