= Deutscher Tanzpreis =

- Awarded for: Artistic dance in Germany
- Sponsored by: Dachverband Tanz Deutschland
- Date: 1983
- Country: Germany
- Reward: €20,000
- First award: 1983
- Website: www.deutschertanzpreis.de/home/

The Deutscher Tanzpreis (German Dance Prize) is a prize for artistic dance in Germany. It has been awarded annually since 1983.

The Deutscher Berufsverband für Tanzpädagogik awarded the prize until 2012. From 2013 to 2017, it was awarded by an association, Förderverein Tanzkunst Deutschland. In 2017 the German Dance Prize was handed over to the Dachverband Tanz Deutschland e.V. (DTD) as sponsor. The Dachverband realizes the award ceremony in close cooperation with the city of Essen. It is awarded to personalities who earned special merits regarding the artistic dance in Germany. From 2005 to 2016, an additional award, Zukunft (Future) has been given to promising young artists in the categories female dancer, male dancer and choreographer. An additional Anerkennungspreis (Prize of acknowledgement) has been given for special merits from 2005 to 2016.

== Recipients ==
=== German Dance Prize ===
- 1983: Gret Palucca
- 1983: Tatjana Gsovsky
- 1984: Kurt Peters
- 1985: Gustav Blank
- 1986: Heinz Laurenzen
- 1987: José de Udaeta
- 1988: John Neumeier
- 1989: Marcia Haydée
- 1990: Karl Heinz Taubert
- 1991: Konstanze Vernon
- 1992: Horst Koegler
- 1993: Hans van Manen
- 1994: Maurice Béjart
- 1995: Pina Bausch
- 1996: Tom Schilling
- 1997: Philippe Braunschweig
- 1998: Birgit Keil
- 1999: Uwe Scholz
- 2000: Fritz Höver
- 2001: Hans Werner Henze
- 2003: Gregor Seyffert
- 2004: William Forsythe
- 2005: Hans Herdlein
- 2006: Reid Anderson
- 2007: Susanne Linke
- 2008: John Neumeier
- 2009: Heinz Spoerli
- 2010: Georgette Tsinguirides
- 2011: Egon Madsen
- 2012: Ivan Liška
- 2013: Ulrich Roehm
- 2014: Bertram Müller
- 2015: Peter Breuer
- 2016: Martin Puttke
- 2018: Nele Hertling
- 2019: Gert Weigelt
- 2020: Raimund Hoghe
- 2021: Heide-Marie Härtel
- 2022: Marco Goecke and Christoph Winkler
- 2023: Malou Airaudo, Josephine Ann Endicott, Lutz Förster and Dominique Mercy
- 2024: Sasha Waltz
- 2026: Christian Spuck

=== Award for outstanding artistic developments in dance ===
- 2018: Ballett des Staatstheaters Nürnberg
- 2019: Jo Parkes / Mobile Dance
- 2020: Antje Pfundtner in Gesellschaft (APiG) and Raphael Hillebrand
- 2021: Claire Cunningham and Ursula Borrmann
- 2022: Verein Aktion Tanz
- 2023: Sophia Neises
- 2024: explore dance
- 2026: Gabriele Brandstetter

=== Award for outstanding performer ===
- 2018: Meg Stuart and her Company Damaged Goods
- 2019: Isabelle Schad
- 2020: Friedemann Vogel
- 2021: Adil Laraki

=== Lifetime Achievement Award ===
- 2022: Reinhild Hoffmann
- 2023: Peter Appel
- 2024: Dieter Heitkamp
- 2026: Tadashi Endo

== Recipients of Deutscher Tanzpreis Zukunft ==
From 2005 to 2015 (with a break in 2008), the German Dance Prize "Future" was also awarded to up-and-coming artists who "have already attract attention"

- 2005: Polina Semionova, Flavio Salamanca (dance), Thiago Bordin (choreography)
- 2006: Alicia Amatrian, Jason Reilly (dance), Christian Spuck (choreography)
- 2007: Katja Wünsche, Marian Walter (dance), Terence Kohler (choreography)
- 2008: no award
- 2009: Marijn Rademaker (dance)
- 2010: Iana Salenko (dance)
- 2011: Daniel Camargo (dance), Eric Gauthier (choreography)
- 2012: Gözde Özgür (dance)
- 2013: Bundesjugendballett Hamburg
- 2014: Demis Volpi (choreography)
- 2015: Elisa Badenes (dance)
- 2016: Marcos Menha (dance); Andrey Kaydanovskiy (choreography)

== Anerkennungspreise ==
- 2005: Royston Maldoom (choreography, dance teacher)
- 2007: Uschi Ziegler
- 2010: Susanne Menck & Christine Eckerle
- 2011: Achim Thorwald
- 2013: Tobias Ehinger (Ballet manager)
- 2014: Nina Hümpel
- 2015: Ricardo Fernando (choreography, ballet director)
- 2016: Elisabeth Exner-Grave, Liane Simmel, Eileen M. Wanke (dance medical professionals)
