= Raimund Hoghe =

German choreographer and dancer (1949–2021)

- Born: 12 May 1949; Wuppertal, North Rhine-Westphalia, Allied-occupied Germany
- Died: 14 May 2021 (aged 72); Düsseldorf, North Rhine-Westphalia, Germany
- Occupations: Journalist; Writer; Dramaturge; Modern dance choreographer; Dancer; Film maker
- Organizations: Tanztheater Wuppertal Pina Bausch
- Awards: Dancer of the Year; Ordre des Arts et des Lettres; Deutscher Tanzpreis
- Website: www.raimundhoghe.com/english.php

Raimund Hoghe (12 May 1949 – 14 May 2021) was a German choreographer, dancer, film maker, journalist, and author. Because he was born with scoliosis, his early efforts were focused on journalism. His writings explored the human condition; a documentation series won him an award by the age of 24. For the weekly Die Zeit, he portrayed personalities, the well-to-do, the less fortunate, and those shunned by society. After meeting Pina Bausch while profiling her, he served as dramaturge and chronicler of her Tanztheater Wuppertal from 1980 to 1990. He made his choreographic debut in 1989, then worked independently. His first solo production, Meinwärts in 1994, was about the Jewish tenor and actor Josef Schmidt, but also Hoghe's nonormative body. He was awarded the Deutscher Tanzpreis in 2020, and is regarded as "one of the protagonists of German contemporary dance theatre".

== Life ==
Hoghe was born and raised in Wuppertal, the son of a single mother. He was born with severe scoliosis. He dreamed of performing in theatre, but thought that performing would not be possible for him because of his physical limitations. He worked as a journalist, and was awarded the Theodor Wolff Prize for a documentary series about Bethel written when he was age 24. He was a freelance writer for the weekly Die Zeit profiling prominent performers like Bruno Ganz, Rex Gildo, and Freddy Quinn, as well as lesser-known persons such as the photographer Helga Paris and Adam Soboczynski, and social outsiders such as cleaners, AIDS patients, and sex workers. His profiles were also published in several books.

When Hoghe profiled Pina Bausch in the late 1970s, she liked his article and engaged him to write program notes for a production of her dance company in Wuppertal, later called Tanztheater Wuppertal. From 1980 to 1990, Hoghe was dramaturge for the company, writing also two books about it. During his time with Bausch at Wuppertal, he collaborated on a number of pieces, including "1980," "Ahnen" and "Bandoneon." Beginning in 1989, he developed his own productions there, with dancers and actors. From 1992, he collaborated with the artist and scenic designer Luca Giacomo Schulte. He produced his first solo, Meinwärts, in 1994, followed by Chambre séparée in 1997 and Another Dream in 2000, as a trilogy about the 20th century. His works dealt with political circumstances, such as the situation of refugees in Europe, and, in the 1990s, the beginning of the AIDS crisis which was a topic in Meinwärts.

Hoghe directed several films, also for television, like his self-portrait Der Buckel (The Hunchback) for the WDR in 1997. His books were translated into several languages. His productions were presented in France, Germany, Norway, Portugal, United Kingdom and U.S., among others. He received awards including the Deutscher Produzentenpreis für Choreografie in 2001 and the Prix de la critique Francaise for Swan Lake, 4 Acts in the category "Best foreign production" in 2006. In 2008, Hoghe was named Dancer of the Year by the reviewers of the Tanz magazine. In 2019 he became an officer of the Ordre des Arts et des Lettres. He received the Deutscher Tanzpreis award in 2020.

Hoghe lived in Düsseldorf, where he died on 14 May 2021, at the age of 72.

== Publications ==
Hoghe's publications include:

- Wenn keiner singt, ist es still. Porträts, Rezensionen und andere Texte. Verlag Theater der Zeit, Berlin 2019, ISBN 978-3-95749-233-3
- Raimund Hoghe. Verlag Theater der Zeit, Berlin, 2013, ISBN 978-3-94-388161-5
- Pina Bausch. Sangensha Publishing, Tokyo, 1999
- Zeitporträts. Beltz Quadriga Verlag, Weinheim/Berlin 1993, ISBN 3-88679-212-9
- Pina Bausch – Historias de teatro danza por Raimund Hoghe. Ultramar Editores, Barcelona 1989
- Bandoneon – Em que o tango pode ser bom para tudo? Attar Editorial, São Paulo 1989
- Pina Bausch – Histoires de théâtre dansé. L’Arche Éditeur, Paris 1987
- Pina Bausch – Tanztheatergeschichten. Mit Fotos von Ulli Weiss. Suhrkamp Verlag, Frankfurt am Main 1987, ISBN 3-518-37837-6
- Wo es nichts zu weinen gibt. Porträts und Reportagen. Van Acken Verlag, Krefeld 1987/90, ISBN 3-923140-43-6
- Preis der Liebe. Rimbaud Presse, Aachen 1984, ISBN 3-89086-900-9
- Anderssein. Lebensläufe außerhalb der Norm. Sammlung Luchterhand, Darmstadt 1982, ISBN 3-472-61367-X
- Bandoneon – Für was kann Tango alles gut sein? Texte und Fotos zu einem Stück von Pina Bausch. Luchterhand Verlag, Darmstadt 1981/2013, ISBN 3-472-61369-6
- Schwäche als Stärke. Bethel – Ein Symbol und die Realität. Neukirchener Verlag, Neukirchen-Vluyn 1976, ISBN 3-7887-0477-2

== Productions ==
Hoghe's productions include:

- 1989: Forbidden Fruit
- 1990: Vento
- 1992: Verdi Prati
- 1994: Meinwärts
- 1995: Geraldo's Solo
- 1997: Chambre séparée
- 1998: Dialogue with Charlotte
- 1999: Lettere amorose
- 2000: Another Dream
- 2002: Sarah, Vincent et moi
- 2002: Young People, Old Voices
- 2003: Tanzgeschichten
- 2004: Sacre – The Rite of Spring
- 2005: Swan Lake, 4 Acts
- 2007: 36, Avenue Georges Mandel
- 2007: Bolero Variationen
- 2008: L’Après-midi
- 2009: Body/Space/Music
- 2009: Sans-titre
- 2010: Si je meurs laissez le balcon ouvert
- 2011: Pas de Deux
- 2012: Cantatas
- 2013: An Evening with Judy
- 2014: Quartet
- 2015: Songs for Takashi
- 2016: Musiques et mots pour Emmanuel
- 2016: La Valse
- 2017: Lettere amorose, 1999–2017
- 2018: Canzone per Ornella
- 2019/20 Postcards from Vietnam

== Films ==
- Die Jugend ist im Kopf / La jeunesse est dans la tête, portrait of Marie-Thérèse Allier, director of the Menagérie de Verre in Paris. Director: Hoghe, production: Arte 2018.
- Cartes Postales, dance film, France 2005, director: Richard Copans, production: Les Films d'Ici, Arte France, first aired on 30 October 2005
- Young People, Old Voices. France, 2005, production: Centre Pompidou Paris.
- Es bleibt noch viel zu sagen, television documentary, Germany, 1980

=== Film portraits ===
- Raimund Hoghe, der Außergewöhnliche. Germany, 2012, 43 min., moderation: Anja Höfer, production: arte, redaction: Square, first aired: 11 November 2012
- Der Buckel. self-portrait, 1997, WDR

== Awards ==
- 1974: Theodor-Wolff-Preis
- 1982: Förderpreis für Literatur der Landeshauptstadt Düsseldorf
- 1983: Förderpreis des Landes Nordrhein-Westfalen für junge Künstlerinnen und Künstler
- 2001: Deutscher Produzentenpreis für Choreographie
- 2006: Prix de la critique Francaise (Meilleur spectacle étranger)
- 2008: Dancer of the Year of the Tanz magazine
- 2019: Ordre des Arts et des Lettres
- 2020: Deutscher Tanzpreis
