= The Fairy Doll (ballet) =

Ballet by Josef Bayer and Joseph Haßreiter

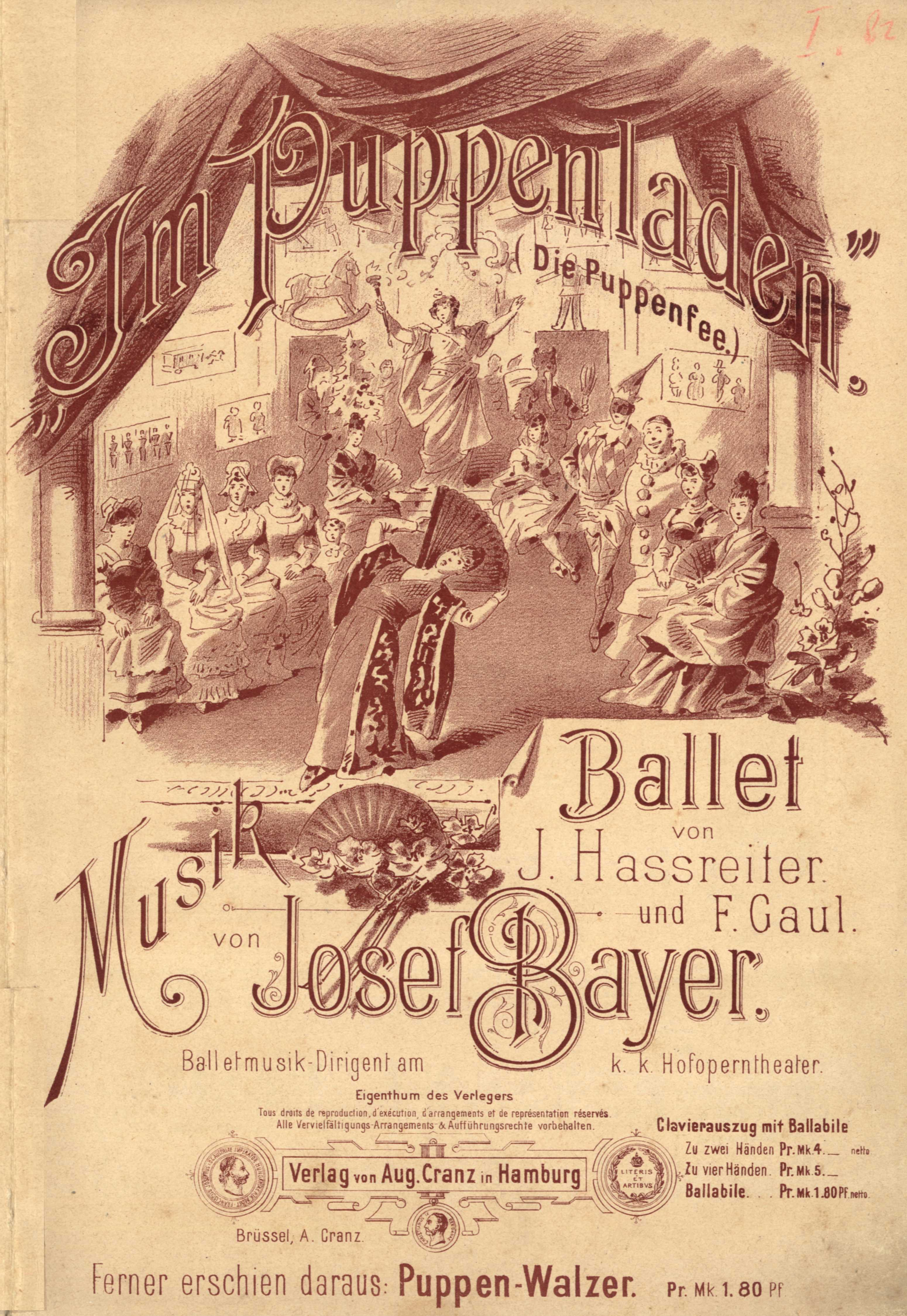
- Choreographer: Joseph Hassreiter; Nikolai Legat and Sergei Legat (1903)
- Music: Josef Bayer; Riccardo Drigo (1903 pas de trois)
- Libretto: Joseph Hassreiter and Franz Xaver Gaul
- Based on: E.T.A. Hoffmann’s "The Sandman
- Premiere: 4 October 1888; Vienna State Opera, Vienna, Austria
- Genre: Classical ballet

The Fairy Doll (German: Die Puppenfee) is a is one-act, two-scene ballet first performed in October 4 1888 at the Vienna State Opera, telling the story of magical dolls coming to life in a Viennese toy shop at night. The libretto was written by Joseph Hassreiter and Franz Xaver Gaul. The ballet's first coreographer was Joseph Hassreiter, with music composed by Josef Bayer in 1888. Camilla Pagliero was the first to dance the role of the Fairy Doll.

The plot was inspired by E.T.A. Hoffmann’s "The Sandman," which also inspired Jacques Offenbach to compose The Tales of Hoffmann and Léo Delibes to write the score for Coppélia. The Fairy Doll, in turn, inspired another ballet, La Boutique Fantasque.

== History ==
The idea for the ballet originated with the Viennese ballet master Joseph Hassreiter and his friend, the painter Franz Xaver Gaul. In early 1888, they conceived an entertaining ballet set in a doll shop, in which dolls would appear as living, human-like figures, based on E.T.A. Hoffmann’s "The Sandman" short story. Hassreiter and Gaul jointly wrote the libretto and, in search of a composer, approached Josef Bayer, conductor at the Imperial Court Opera, who had already gained recognition for his ballet ''Wiener Walzer''. Bayer immediately embraced the concept and began composing. The ballet premiered at the Imperial Court Opera (now the Vienna State Opera) on 4 October 1888, although an earlier version under the title ''Im Puppenladen'' had already been performed in April 1888 at the Palais of Prince Johann Liechtenstein, as part of a charity event under the patronage of Princess Pauline Metternich. In that performance, only aristocrats took part.

In 1891, the ballet was staged in Warsaw at the Grand Theatre (Teatr Wielki), with choreography by I. Ménier and V. Legren. It was also performed in 1891 by the Stuttgart Ballet. On 20 February 1897, it was presented at the Bolshoi Theatre in Moscow, with choreography by José Méndez, designs by Karl Walz, and conducted by Stepan Ryabov. The cast included Adelina Dzhuri as the Fairy Doll, alongside V. E. Polivanov, A. I. Lashchilin, and I. E. Sidorov. It was also presented at the Paris Olympia that year.

The ballet continued to be staged in various productions throughout the early 20th century and beyond. The ballet was revived at the Bolshoi Theatre in 1900 under the choreography of Ivan Khlyustin. In 1903, a major production was staged at the Mariinsky Theatre by Nikolai Legat and Sergei Legat, with designs by Léon Bakst and conducted by Riccardo Drigo, who composed music for a new pas de trois for the ballet, for the Fairy Doll and two Pierrots (originally danced by the Legat brothers). The role of the Fairy Doll was performed by Matilda Kschessinska, later also danced by Tamara Karsavina and others, while notable performers included Anna Pavlova and Agrippina Vaganova.

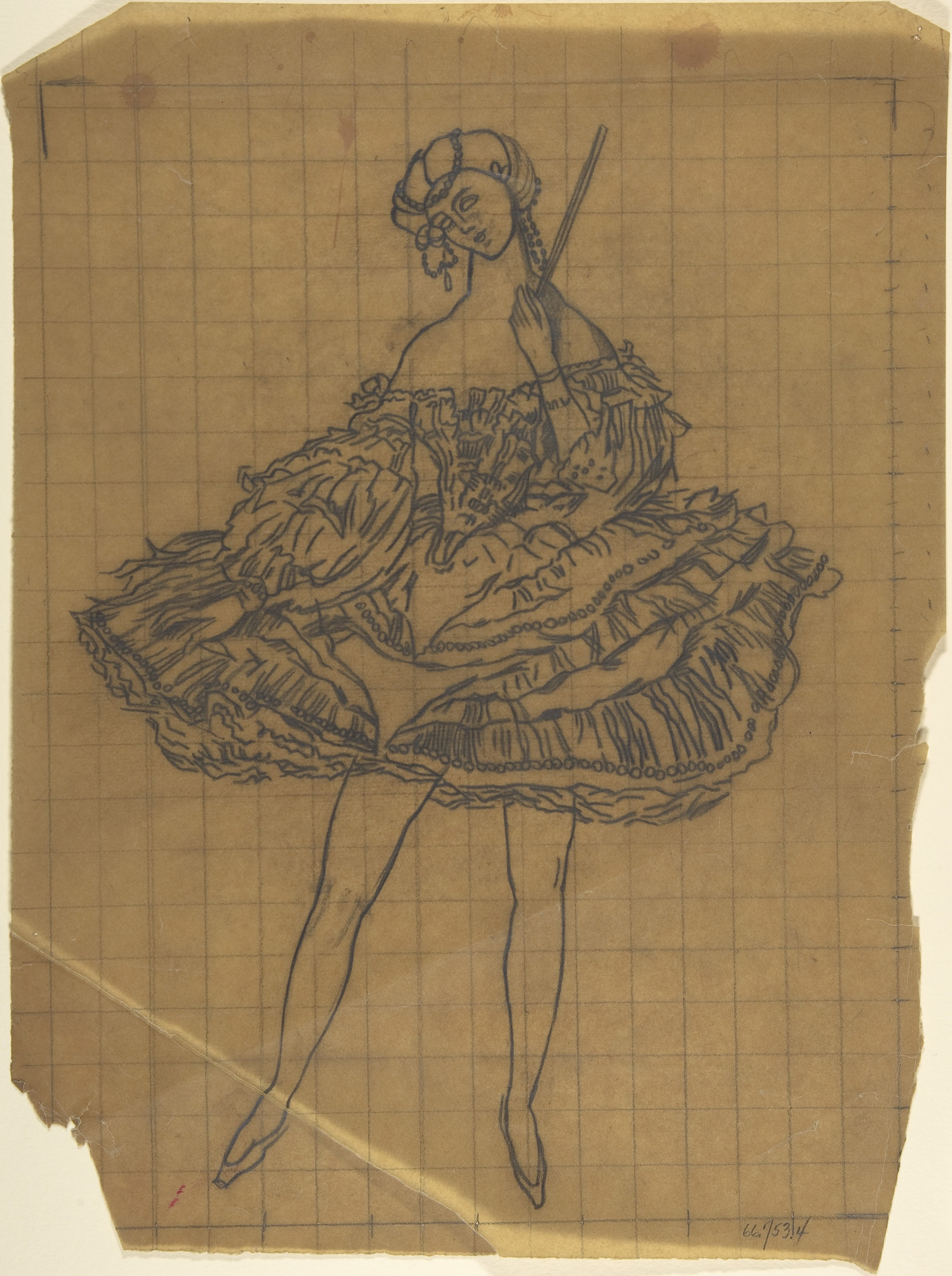
Russian female dancer costume for 'La Fée des Poupées', drawing by Léon Bakst

Subsequent productions included a 1905 staging in London at the Empire Theatre choreographed by Katti Lanner, and a 1914 version performed by the touring company of Anna Pavlova with choreography by Ivan Clustine. A 1930 production took place at La Scala under the choreography of G. Kröller.

Various versions of The Fairy Doll continue to be performed. The Vienna State Opera still stages the Hassreiter version, and the ballet reached its 750th performance with the company in 1973. In 1989, Richard Slaughter reconstructed Anna Pavlova’s version for Ballet Creations of London’s A Portrait of Pavlova, before staging the full ballet for the Bournemouth Ballet Club in 1992. The version by the Legat brothers survives at the Mariinsky Theatre in the form of the Fairy Doll Pas de Trois, and both this excerpt and the complete ballet are still occasionally performed, particularly in gala performances and as graduation pieces.

== Plot ==
In the original libretto, the story takes place in a Parisian toy shop in the 1830s.

=== Scene 1: The toy shop ===
The curtain rises on the everyday life of a shop selling mechanical dolls. Assistants keep order while the owner attends to his work. A postman delivers letters, a messenger demands a tip, and a maid arrives asking for a doll to be repaired. The shopkeeper restores the toy.

A merchant enters with his wife and daughter. The child becomes fascinated with a baby doll and insists on buying it. During the commotion, another doll is accidentally activated, startling them. After disagreements over prices, they leave.

A commissioner arrives with news that a wealthy Englishman will soon visit. Sir James Plumpstershire, his wife, and their children enter the shop. The owner presents various dolls dressed in costumes representing different nations, each performing characteristic dances, including Tirolean Ländler, Chinese Polka, Spanish Dance, Japanese Mazurka and the Harlequin’s Tarantella.The highlight is the Fairy Doll, who performs a waltz. The Englishman is delighted and purchases her before leaving with his family.

=== Scene 2: Night in the shop ===
After closing time, the shop is locked and the lights are extinguished. At midnight, the Fairy Doll emerges and, with a wave of her wand, brings all the dolls to life. The shop fills with magical light as the dolls dance and celebrate.

At one point, the shopkeeper and his assistant return, having heard noises, but everything appears normal. Once they leave again, the dolls resume their festivities, honoring the Fairy Doll as their queen. As dawn approaches, they return to their original positions before the shop reopens.

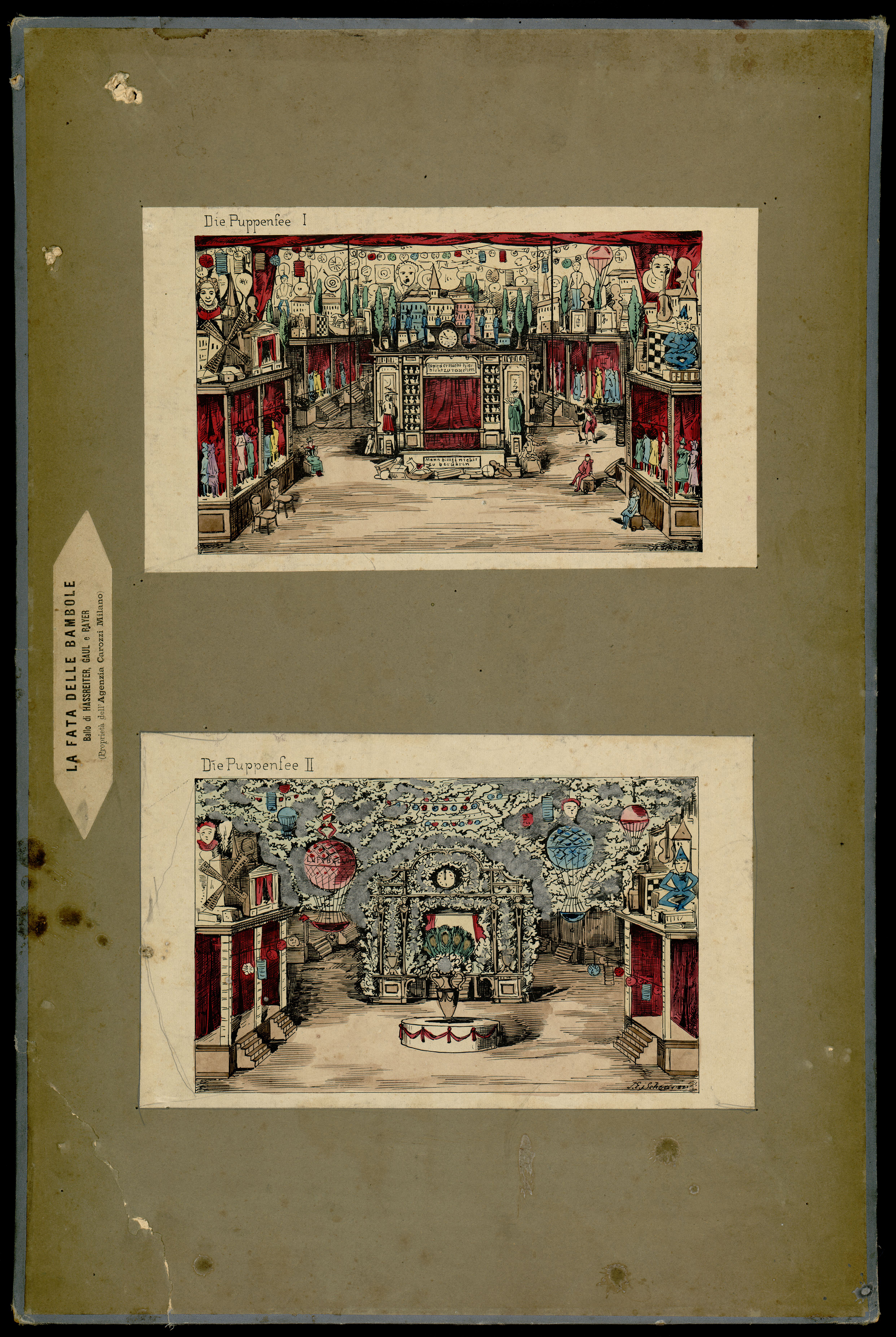
Un gran Bazar di giuocattoli, set design for Die Puppenfee act 1, 2 (1888).

== Roles ==
The principal roles typically include:

Human characters
- The Toymaker (or Shopkeeper)
- His Assistant (Chief Clerk)
- Sir James Plumpstershire (a wealthy Englishman)
- Lady Plumpstershire
- Their children
- Various customers (such as a peasant family, maid, postman, etc.)

Dolls

- The Fairy Doll (principal role)
- Harlequin
- Columbine
- Pierrots (often two)
- Baby Doll (Bébé)
- Spanish Doll
- French Doll
- Chinese Doll
- Japanese Doll
- Tyrolean (Austrian) Doll
- Soldier Doll
- Drummer Doll
- Other mechanical dolls (ensemble)

Depending on the production, additional character dolls may be included, reflecting different national or theatrical types, as the ballet is structured as a divertissement.

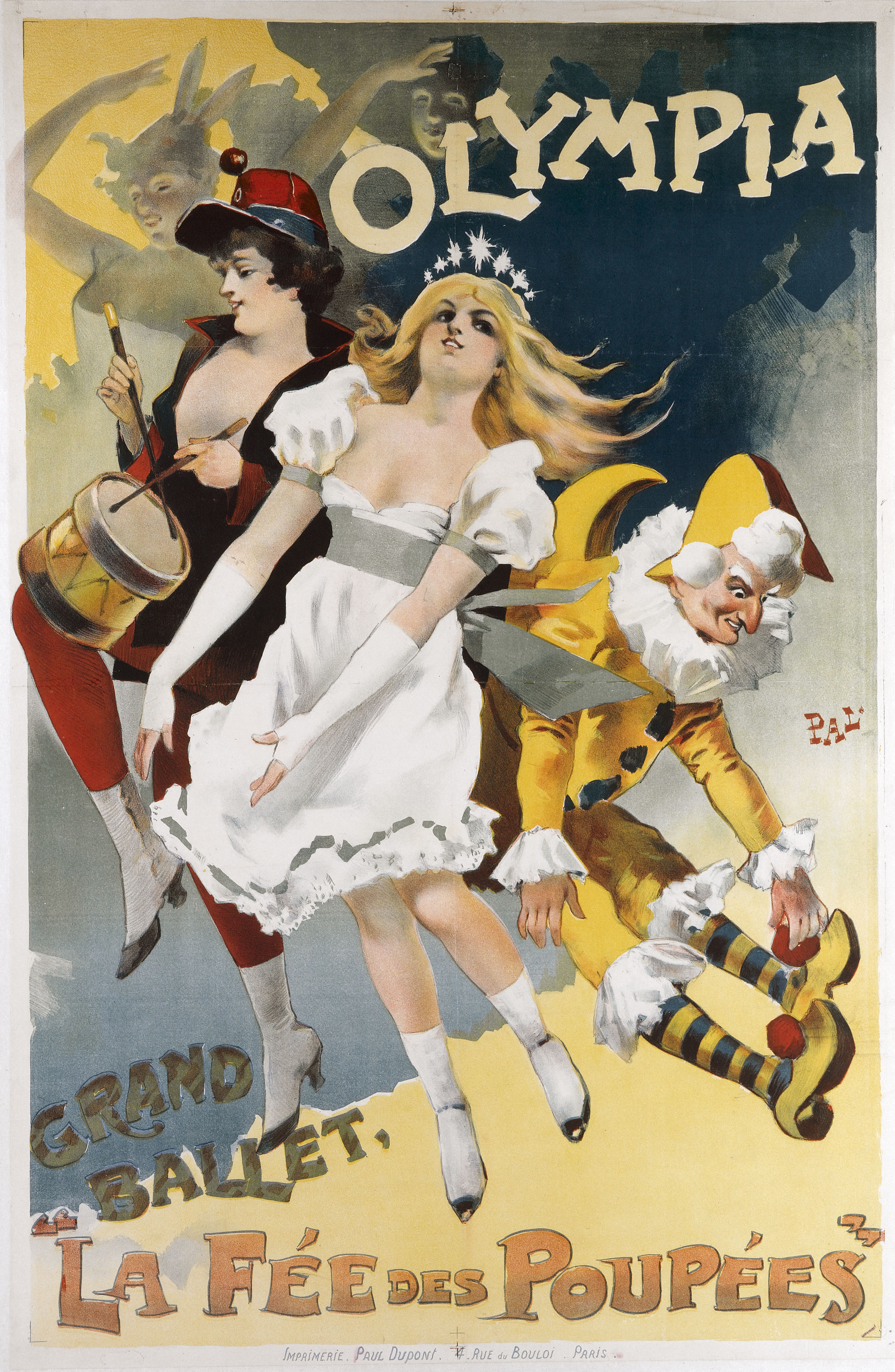
Advertising poster for performances at the Paris Olympia by Jean de Paleologu

== Score ==
The score was composed by Josef Bayer in 1888. In its original form, it consists of a sequence of short character pieces typical of divertissement ballets of the late 19th century. Later productions incorporate additional music by other composers, such as Drigo's Pizzicato piece for the pas de trois.

- Vorspiel: Allegro
- No. 1: Allegro
- No. 2
- No. 3: Lento
- No. 4: Moderato
- No. 5: Moderato
- No. 6: Lento (Oberösterreicherin)
- No. 7: Baby – Allegretto
- No. 8: Chinesin – Allegretto
- No. 9: Spanierin – Allegro
- No. 10: Japanerin – Lento
- No. 11: Harlekin – Allegro
- No. 12: Moderato
- No. 13: Allegro
- No. 14: Andante
- No. 15: Waltz
- No. 16: Ballabile
- No. 17
- No. 18: March
- No. 19: Galop
- No. 20
