= Mikhail Agrest =

Russian conductor

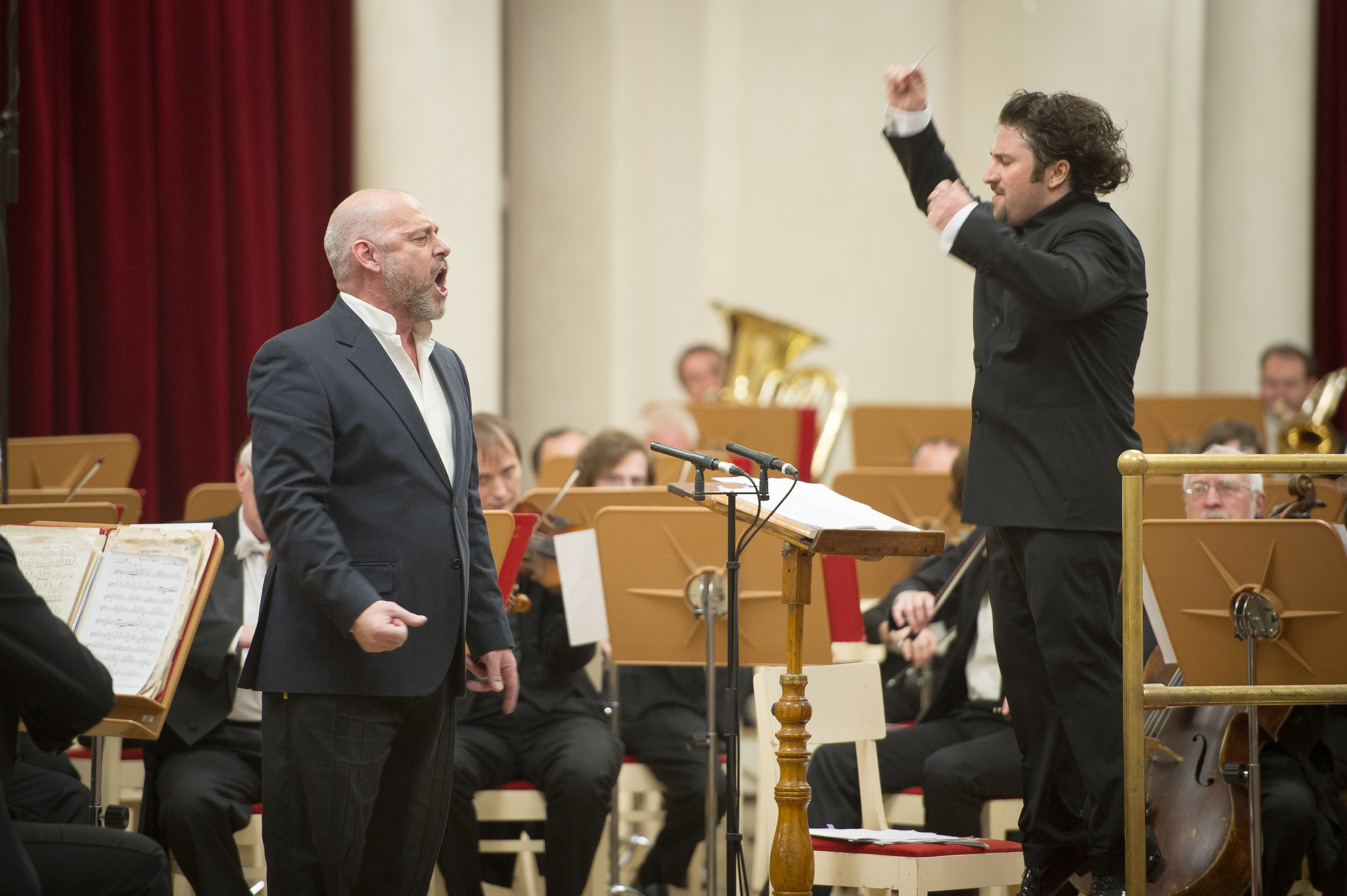
- Mikhail Agrest (right) in 2015
- Born: Saint Petersburg
- Education: Indiana University Bloomington, Saint Petersburg Conservatory, American Academy of Conducting of the Aspen Music Festival
- Occupation: Conductor

Mikhail Agrest is a Russian conductor, who has been employed since 2001 by the Mariinsky Theatre in Saint Petersburg.

== Biography ==
Mikhail Agrest was born in Saint Petersburg, the son of professional musicians.

He emigrated in 1989 to the United States with his family to Charleston, South Carolina, where his parents played in the Charleston Symphony Orchestra, and continued his violin studies, receiving a degree in violin performance from the Indiana University Bloomington where he studied with Josef Gingold.

He returned to Saint Petersburg to study conducting under Ilya Musin and Mariss Jansons at the Rimsky-Korsakov Saint Petersburg State Conservatory. In the summers of 2000 and 2001 he studied with David Zinman and Jorma Panula at the American Academy of Conducting of the Aspen Music Festival.

Back in Saint Petersburg in 2001 Mikhail joined the Mariinsky Theatre.

As an international guest conductor, he made his debut at the Metropolitan Opera in New York in July 2003 with the Mariinsky Theatre Orchestra with a production of Rimsky-Korsakov’s opera The Legend of the Invisible City of Kitezh and the Maiden Fevroniya.

In 2010 he returned to Charleston to conduct the Charleston Symphony Orchestra in a concert.

In July 2019 Agrest became the principal conductor of the Stuttgart Ballet. In late 2021 he was fired, apparently after a disagreement with Tamas Detrich. The administration of the Ballet refused to give reasons or details to the media.

== Sources and external links ==
- Mariinsky website: Agrest
- SeattleSymphony.org: Agrest
- Semperoper.de: Agrest (in German)
- Operabase: Agrest
- Charleston City Paper 16 March 2010 - Agrest Conducts SO
- BolshoiRussia.com Agrest
- Konserthuset.se: Afrest (in Swedish)
