= Renato Zanella =

Italian ballet dancer, choreographer, and director

- Known for: Dance
- Movement: Ballet

Renato Zanella is an Italian-born ballet dancer, choreographer and director. He studied classical ballet for several years before becoming a choreographer for various professional companies. Due to his success, he has won many awards and honorary titles within the ballet community.

== Life ==
Zanella studied classical dance in his hometown before going on to complete his ballet education at École supérieure de danse de Cannes Rosella Hightower. His first engagement as a dancer came in 1982 in Basel with Heinz Spoerli. Zanella joined the Stuttgart Ballet in 1985 and was appointed permanent choreographer there in 1993, thanks to artistic director Marcia Haydée. In 1995, he was appointed artistic director and resident choreographer for the Vienna State Opera, a position he held for ten years until the end of the 2004/2005 season. From 2001 to 2005, Renato Zanella also acted as artistic director of the Vienna State Opera Ballet. From 2005 to 2011, he worked as a freelance artist on a global scale and, in September 2011, he was appointed artistic director of the Greek National Ballet in Athens.

In January 2021, he was appointed artistic director of ballet in the Slovenian National Theatre Opera and Ballet in Ljubljana, Slovenia.

== Ballets ==
In 1989, Renato Zanella choreographed his first work, Die andere Seite. It was presented at the Young Choreographers’ programme of the Stuttgart Ballet based Noverre Society (Stuttgarter Noverre-Gesellschaft), and was included as part of Stuttgart Ballet's repertoire. “Stati d’animo” for Marcia Haydée and Richard Cragun followed in 1991. In April 1992, Renato Zanella's first full-length ballet “Mann im Schatten” was premiered in Stuttgart.

He has choreographed several ballets for the Stuttgart Ballet including “Empty Place” (November 1992), “Black Angels” (March 1993) and his second full-length ballet “Mata Hari” (December 1993) with Marcia Haydée in the leading role. “Empty Place” was later included in the repertoires of the Teatro Municipal de Lima and the Vienna State Opera.

In December 1993, he staged “Konzertantes Duo” and followed a year later with “Watching Waters” for Les Ballets de Monte-Carlo. He also choreographed “Pieces of Earth” for Introdans in April 1995. “Love Beyond” was staged in September 1996, "Ostarrichi" was staged in October 1999, "Harlekin & Colombine" was staged in September 2001 and "Concerto Italiano" was staged in September 2003. He was responsible for the choreography of “... schatten von sehnsucht ...” (February 1998) and “Moses and Aron” (October 1999) for the Ballet of the Deutsche Oper Berlin (Berlin State Ballet).

His full-length ballet “Wolfgang Amadé” premiered in March 1998 and was staged for the Madlenianum Opera and Theatre in Belgrade.

In the summer of 1992, he choreographed “Voyage” for Vladimir Malakhov, which was first staged in October 1993 for the Vienna State Opera. In June 1993, he created “Apollon” for the John Cranko School and Vladimir Malakhov. He premiered his first creation for the Vienna State Opera Ballet, “La Chambre”, in February 1994. His first ballet as artistic director of the Vienna State Opera was “Konzertantes Duo”, which he premiered in September 1995. In December 1995, he created “Mon Euridice” for Vladimir Malakhov. Renato Zanella premiered his first complete programme for the company – “Strawinski-Abend: Symphony, Movements, Sacre” in April 1996. In February 1997, he staged “Elements” at Vienna's Odeon Theatre and the next month he created “Alles Walzer”. In December 1997, he staged "Laus Deo" at the Vienna State Opera.

In the 2005/2006 season, he choreographed the ballet “Der Spielmann” for Birgit Keil in Karlsruhe. Renato Zanella choreographed the full-length ballet “Peer Gynt” for the Ballett des Teatro dell´Opera di Roma (November 2007) and “Amandi” for the Baden State Theatre Ballet in Karlsruhe (das Ballett des Badischen Staatstheater Karlsruhe) (April 2008).

== Operas ==
In 2003, he choreographed the opera “Die Zauberin” for a co-production of the Teatro San Carlos in Lisbon and the Mariinski Theatre in St. Petersburg. “Die Sieben Todsünden” was choreographed for the Neue Oper Wien in 2005.

Furthermore, Renato Zanella choreographed the ballets for “Rienzi, der Letzte der Tribunen”, “Le prophète” and “Guillaume Tell” at the Vienna State Opera and served as movement director in “Don Giovanni” and “Roméo et Juliette”. He also provided choreography for “Jenůfa”, “Der Riese vom Steinfeld”, “Jonny spielt auf”, “Daphne” and “Le nozze di Figaro”.

In December 2007, Zanella choreographed the ballet interludes for the opera “La Juive”, which premiered in Zürich.

Renato Zanella was responsible for setting movement for the singers in Salvatore Sciarrino's Perseus and Andromeda.

Zanella also choreographed for John Adam's opera “A Flowering Tree”, which was premiered at the Chicago Opera Theater in May 2008.

In 2011, the opera “Die Trojaner”, was premiered at the Deutsche Oper Berlin with dance sequences created by Renato Zanella. In May 2011, the operetta “Die lustige Witwe”, was premiered at the Vienna Volksoper with ballet interludes choreographed by Zanella.

In April 2012, Renato provided the choreography for the opera Fürst Igor which was premiered at Zurich Opera House. The work was reprised and performed in September 2012 at Hamburg State Opera.

== Special projects ==
In the year 2000 he started a dance project called “off ballet special” in co-operation with the “ich bin o.k.” (I'm O.K.) Dance Company – an association where disabled and non-disabled members dance together with members of the Vienna State Opera Ballet. In addition to their own matinee performances at the Vienna State Opera, ich bin o.k.’s performance highlights have included taking part in the opening of the Vienna Opera Ball in 2001 and a guest performance at the Polish National Opera, Warsaw in 2004.

Renato Zanella has choreographed several pieces for the annual New Year’s Concerts performed by the Vienna Philharmonic Orchestra which are televised to millions of viewers all over the world. For the New Year’s Concert in 2010 he choreographed the polka-mazurka “Ein Herz, ein Sinn!”, and the waltz “Morgenblätter” with costumes by Valentino.

He was further commissioned as choreographer for the film “Jedermanns Fest” (directed by Fritz Lehner) and for the “World Sports Awards of the Century” at the Vienna State Opera as well as the “Toyota Millennium Concert” in Tokyo.

== Other roles ==
Renato Zanella has been much in demand as a juror at dance competitions: the “Prix de Lausanne” dance competition (1995 and 1999), the “Concours International de Danse de Paris” (1998), the “Concours International de Chorégraphie Classique” in Paris, the “International Ballet Competition of Luxembourg” and the International Choreographic Competition Hannover in Hanover, Germany (all in 1999). In the year 2000 he was vice president of the 2nd International Ballet Competition in St. Pölten and a member of the Monaco Danses Dances Forum; in 2001 he was honorary president of the ÖTR Contest for Ballet and Contemporary Dance in Vienna and a member of the jury at the competition in Luxembourg and at the Choreography Competition in Helsinki as well as at the Prix Dom Pérignon competition in Hamburg.

== Awards ==
The Italian magazine “Danza & Danza” awarded him the title of “Best Italian Choreographer Abroad” at the Teatro La Fenice in Venice in 1995. He received the award “Premio Internazionale Gino Tani” in Rome in the year 2000 for his choreographic achievements and in 2001 he was awarded the “Jakob Prandtauer-Preis” in St. Pölten. In the same year “Danza & Danza” awarded him the prize for “Best Artistic Director” for 2001. He has also been awarded the “Austrian Cross of Honour for Science and Art” by the Republic of Austria. He received the prize for “the Best New Production in Italy” (2007) for his full-length choreography of “Peer Gynt” for the Balletto dell´Opera di Roma.
