= Elisa Badenes =

Spanish ballet dancer

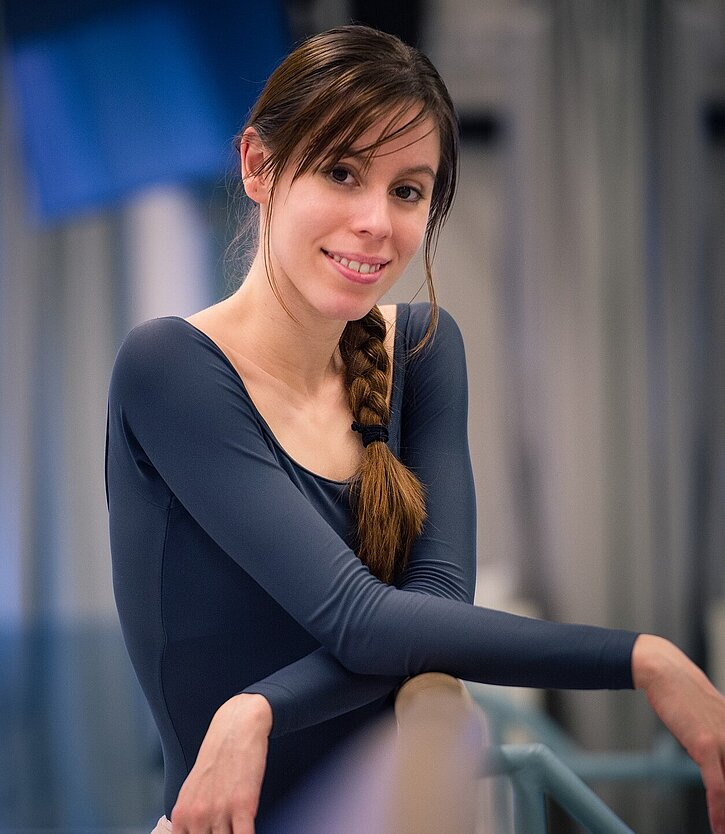
- Born: 1992; Valencia, Spain
- Education: Conservatorio Profesional de Danza de Valencia; The Royal Ballet School
- Occupation: Ballet dancer
- Career
- Current group: Stuttgart Ballet

Elisa Badenes is a Spanish ballet dancer who is currently a principal dancer at the Stuttgart Ballet in Germany.

== Early life ==
Badenes was born in Valencia, Spain. She started ballet at Conservatorio Profesional de Danza de Valencia at age 11. In 2008, after competing at the Prix de Lausanne, she trained at The Royal Ballet School for a year with a scholarship.

== Career ==
In 2009, Badenes became an apprentice with Stuttgart Ballet as after she graduated, and became a member of the company's corps de ballet a year later. She became a principal dancer in 2013. Roles she performed include Odette/Odile in Swan Lake, Aurora in The Sleeping Beauty, Juliet in Romeo and Juliet, Tatiana in Onegin and Baroness Mary Vetsera in Mayerling. She has also danced in productions by Jerome Robbins, George Balanchine, Hans van Manen and William Forsythe, and worked with choreographers such as Sidi Larbi Cherkaoui, Wayne McGregor and Christian Spuck. As a guest artist, Badenes performed with The Australian Ballet.

== Selected repertoire ==
Badenes repertoire include:

- A Streetcar named Desire: Stella
- Kingdom of Shades from La Bayadère: Nikija
- Dances at a Gathering: Pink and Apricot
- La fille mal gardée: Lise
- Giselle: Peasant-Pas de deux
- Le Grand Pas de deux
- Initials R.B.M.E.: B., Solo roles in the 1st and 4th movement
- Krabat: Pumphutt
- La Sylphide: Effie, Pas de huit
- Lulu. A Monstre Tragedy: Lulu
- Mayerling: Baroness Mary Vetsera
- Onegin: Tatiana, Olga
- Romeo and Juliet: Juliet, Gipsy
- Swan Lake: Odette/ Odile, little swan, Pas de six
- Symphony in C: 2nd and 4th movement
- The Lady of the Camellias: Marguerite Gautier
- The Sleeping Beauty: Aurora, Eloquence Fairy, Blue Bird's Princess
- Song of the Earth
- Tchaikovsky Pas de deux

=== Created roles ===
- The Firebird (Sidi Larbi Cherkaoui)
- A. Memory
- Almost Blue
- Big Blur
- Black Breath
- Calma Apparente
- Das Fräulein von S.
- Dark Glow
- Il Concertone
- Krabat: The Kantorka
- Limelight
- Little Monsters
- Messenger
- Naiad (Douglas Lee)
- Neurons
- PS
- Qi
- Salome: Salome
- Skinny
- Yantra

== Awards ==
Badenes received following awards:

- 2008 Scholarship, Prix de Lausanne
- 2009 Gold medal, Youth America Grand Prix
- 2011 The Audience Choice Award, Erik Bruhn Prize
- 2015 German Dance Prize Future
