= Uwe Scholz =

- Born: 31 December 1958; Jugenheim, Hesse, Germany
- Died: 21 November 2004 (aged 45); Berlin
- Occupation: contemporary dance ballet choreographer

Uwe Scholz (31 December 1958 – 21 November 2004) was a German ballet dancer, director, and choreographer.

== Life ==
Scholz was born in Jugenheim (now Seeheim-Jugenheim) in Hesse, Germany on 31 December 1958, and moved as a child to the Landestheater Darmstadt for ballet and music training.

In 1973, he was admitted to John Cranko's Ballet School in Stuttgart, one month before Cranko's death, and studied under Marcia Haydée. Scholz also studied, on scholarship, at Balanchine's School of American Ballet in New York. He graduated from Stuttgart in 1977, and joined the Stuttgart Ballet. At 26 he became the director of the Zürich Ballet, and directed there for the next 6 years, before returning to Germany to become director of the Leipzig Ballet, where he was also chief choreographer. He remained in Leipzig from 1991 until his death. Among his most famous creations are Mozart's Great Mass, Pax Questuosa by Udo Zimmermann, Berlioz's Symphonie fantastique, The Red and the Black by Stendhal, and much else. In 1993 he was appointed professor at the University of Music and Theatre Leipzig. He was also a founding member of the Freie Akademie der Künste zu Leipzig (Free Academy of Arts in Leipzig).

He died on 21 November 2004 in Berlin.

Since 2020, the choreologist Tatjana Thierbach has been the heir and owner of Uwe Scholz’s moral rights. Since 2026, she also holds all rights of use and licensing for Uwe Scholz’s complete works. Uwe Scholz Legacy, which she founded, is dedicated to the preservation and performance of Uwe Scholz’s choreographic legacy.

== Work ==
- "Ballette von Uwe Scholz". Tatjana Thierbach (in German). 26 January 2022.

== Awards ==
- Omaggio Alla Danza (1987)
- Order of Merit of the Federal Republic of Germany (1996)
- Bayerischer Theaterpreis (Theatre prize of the Bavarian State Government) in the dance category (1998)
- Deutscher Tanzpreis (1999)

== Media links ==
- Le Sacre du Printemps – EuroArts on YouTube
- Kyrie from Great Mass in C minor, Mozart – Leipziger Oper on YouTube
