= Theaterhaus Stuttgart =

Building in Stuttgart, Baden-Württemberg, Germany

Coordinates: 48°48′38″N 9°10′46″E

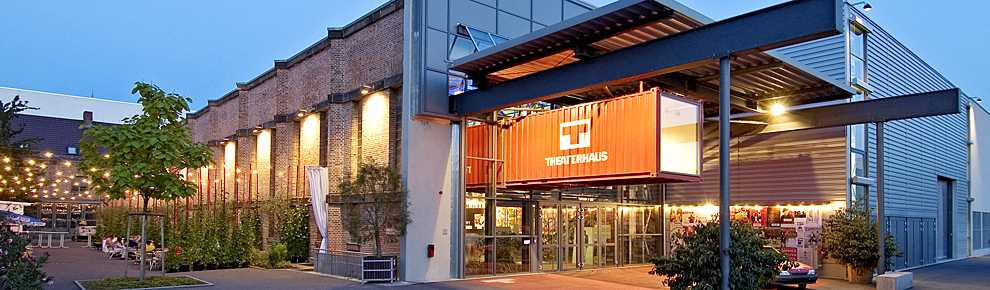
- Interactive map of Theaterhaus Stuttgart
- Address: Siemensstraẞe 7, 70469; Feuerbach, Stuttgart; Germany
- Location: Rheinstahlhallen
- Owner: Theaterhaus Stuttgart e.V.
- Type: Theatre
- Public transit: Stuttgart Stadtbahn

Construction
- Opened: 1984

Website
- theaterhaus.com/en

The Theaterhaus Stuttgart is a theatre in Stuttgart, Baden-Württemberg, Germany. The theatre's director is Werner Schretzmeier. In 2026 Theaterhaus Stuttgart introduced a voluntary ticketing scheme in which men were charged 16% more to reflect the gender pay gap in Germany.
