= Glen Tetley =

American ballet and modern dancer (1926–2007)

Glen Tetley

Glen Tetley (February 3, 1926 – January 26, 2007) was an American ballet and modern dancer as well as a choreographer who mixed ballet and modern dance to create a new way of looking at dance, and is best known for his piece Pierrot Lunaire.

== Biography ==
Glenford Andrew Tetley, Jr. was born on February 3, 1926, in Cleveland, Ohio. Initially pre-med he attended Franklin and Marshall College, interrupted by a stint in the Navy. He moved to New York, graduating with a B.S. from New York University in 1948. Interested in dance, he studied ballet in New York with Antony Tudor and Margaret Craske as well as at George Balanchine’s School of American Ballet.

Glen began his career as a dancer, dancing in Hanya Holm's Broadway production of Kiss Me, Kate in 1948 and Juno in 1959, as well as with the New York City Opera Ballet, John Butler's American Dance Theatre, and the Joffrey Ballet where he was an original member. Later he danced with American Ballet Theatre and Jerome Robbins's Ballets: USA. Tetley's choreographic style rises from his experiences with modern dance teachers like Holm and Martha Graham as well as his time with Tudor and Craske and the American Ballet Theatre. Because of this mix in dance education, Tetley's choreography is a distinct blend between ballet and modern dance. Tetley wanted to achieve a mix of "modern dance's visceral earthiness with the ethereal lyricism of classical ballet". Mary Hinkson, a former dancer from the original Martha Graham company, has assisted Tetley all over the world. Her knowledge of the Graham technique helped shaping ballet dancers into Tetley's choreography.

== Choreography ==
What made Tetley stand out among other choreographers was his ability to seamlessly mix ballet and modern dance. Tetley choreographed over 50 ballets for some of the world's most famous dance companies. Tetley made his choreographic premier in 1962 with Pierrot Lunaire which he choreographed for his newly formed chamber company. Tetley based this piece on music of the same name by composer Arnold Schoenberg. Though this piece was one of his first choreographic ventures, it is heralded by many as one of his best and most iconic. It is also here where audiences first saw his iconic mix of ballet and modern dance. Other works choreographed by Tetley include: Contredances, Gemini, Odalisque, Ricercare, Le Sacre du printemps, Sargasso, Sphinx, and Voluntaries. Tetley moved to Europe and became the Artistic Director for the Netherlands Dance Theatre in 1969 and the Stuttgart Ballet where he also danced from 1974–1976, before returning to North America to work with the National Ballet of Canada. While in Europe and Canada, Tetley choreographed many new pieces such as Alice in 1986 for the National Ballet of Canada. At the time of his departure, many in the American dance community would either train in ballet or modern dance, but never both. Some believe that because of this rigidity and inability to accept the fusion of modern dance and ballet, Tetley moved to Europe where the atmosphere was more artistically free.

=== Style ===
Throughout his choreography Tetley displayed "fervid intensity, sinuous nonstop propulsion, and voluptuous physicality". While Tetley does not intentionally create abstract pieces, he uses his movement in order to "convey his meditations on themes from myth, music, theater, and literature".

== Personal life ==
Scott Douglas was his long term partner for 40 years. On January 26, 2007, Tetley died in Florida after a battle with skin cancer. Dancers, such as Karen Kain, a member of the National Ballet of Canada, remember Tetley as a choreographer who had a "ferocious demand for total artistic commitment", while David Allan recalls that Tetley "fired up your imagination and made you look at yourself differently". Among the members of his chamber company was Christopher Bruce, the lead in his signature work, Pierrot Lunaire who cites Tetley as one of his inspirations.

== Works ==
- 1977: ballet "Mythical Hunters"
