= Romeo and Juliet (Cranko) =

1962 ballet by John Cranko

- Choreographer: John Cranko
- Music: Sergei Prokofiev
- Premiere: 1962; Stuttgart
- Original ballet company: Stuttgart Ballet
- Genre: Neoclassical ballet
- Type: Classical ballet

Romeo and Juliet is ballet created by John Cranko to Sergei Prokofiev's eponymous score for the Stuttgart Ballet in 1962 and first seen in America in 1969. The Joffrey Ballet presented the first American production of Cranko's choreography in its 1984–1985 season, including performances in New York City at the New York State Theater and in Washington, D.C. at the Kennedy Center.

== Casts ==
=== Stuttgart Ballet ===
- Original
- Marcia Haydée Juliet
- Ray Barra Romeo

- American premiere
- Marcia Haydée Juliet
- Richard Cragun Romeo

=== Joffrey Ballet ===
- 1985
- Patricia Miller Juliet
- Deborah Dawn Rosalind
- Charlene Gehm MacDougal Lady Capulet
- James Canfield Romeo
- Luis Perez Mercutio
- Jerel Hilding Tybalt
- Tom Mossbrucker Paris

== Reviews ==
The New York Times, "The Joffrey's rendering, supervised by Georgette Tsinguirides of the Stuttgart is lavish and formally fascinating."
