= Gleich =

Gleich is a German language habitational surname. Notable people with the name include:

- Ashley Moyer-Gleich (b. 1987), American professional basketball referee
- Caroline Gleich (b. 1985), American skier, mountaineer, and environmental activist
- Frank Gleich (1894–1949), backup outfielder in Major League Baseball
- Gerhard Gleich (b. 1941), Austrian artist
- Gerold von Gleich (1869–1938), German army officer
- John Gleich (1879–1927), Baltic-German merchant, painter and publicist
- Jonathan Gleich (b. 1958), activist from New York City
- Josef Alois Gleich (1772–1841), Austrian civil servant, and a prolific dramatist and novelist
