= Monrepos Palace =

Coordinates: 48°55′11″N 9°10′10″E

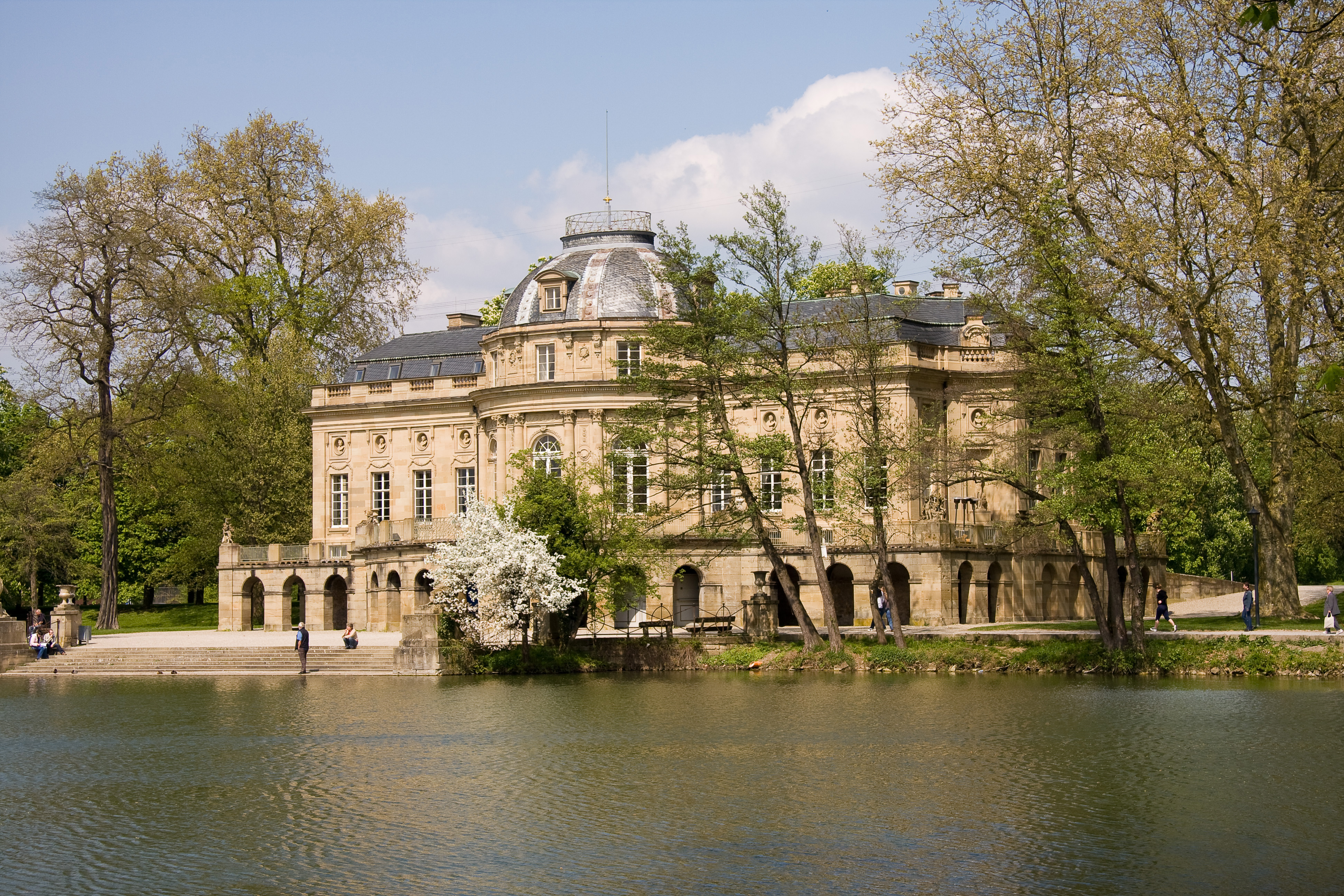
Lakeside view of Monrepos

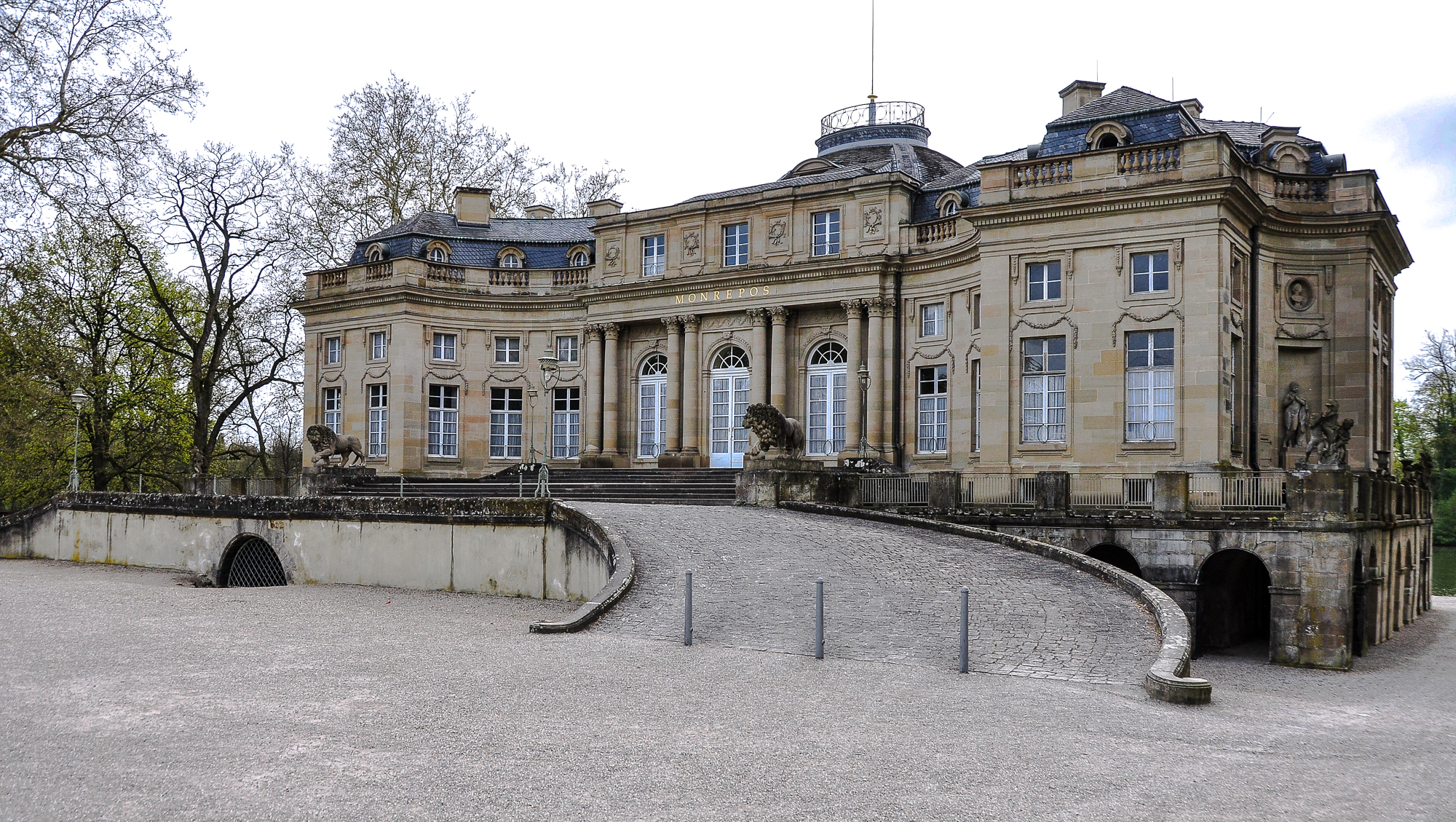
View from the park side

Monrepos (German: Seeschloss Monrepos) is a lakeside schloss in Ludwigsburg, Germany. Although quite far and almost separate from Favorite Palace and Ludwigsburg Palace, it is connected to the rest of the grounds by way of pedestrian paths. It is one of the two minor palaces on the estate, along with the main one. The smaller ones were used as hunting lodges.

Of all three, this is the only one that is still owned by the royal family of Württemberg after its overthrow in 1918. Much of the privately owned land surrounding Monrepos is now an 18-hole golf course, unlike the state-owned part, which is made up of parks and museums.

Since the 16th century, the Dukes of Württemberg enjoyed hunting along the Eglosheimer Lake. In 1714, Duke Eberhard Ludwig had an octagonal pavilion, the Seehäuslein ("Little Lake House"), constructed on the northern shore.

== See also ==
- Lustschloss
- Schloss Favorite, Ludwigsburg
