= Nakas =

Nakas may refer to:

== People ==
- Audrius Nakas (born 1967), Lithuanian politician
- Kęstutis Nakas (born 1953), American playwright, author, performer, director, and teacher
- Nikolaos Nakas (born 1982), German footballer
- Šarūnas Nakas (born 1962), Lithuanian composer, essayist, curator, filmmaker, and broadcaster
- Stelios Nakas (born 1994), Greek footballer

== Places ==
- Nakas (mountain), highest point of Orenburg Oblast, Russia
- Nakas (river), a river in Bashkortostan, Russia
