= Jagdish Temple, Udaipur =

Jagdish Temple
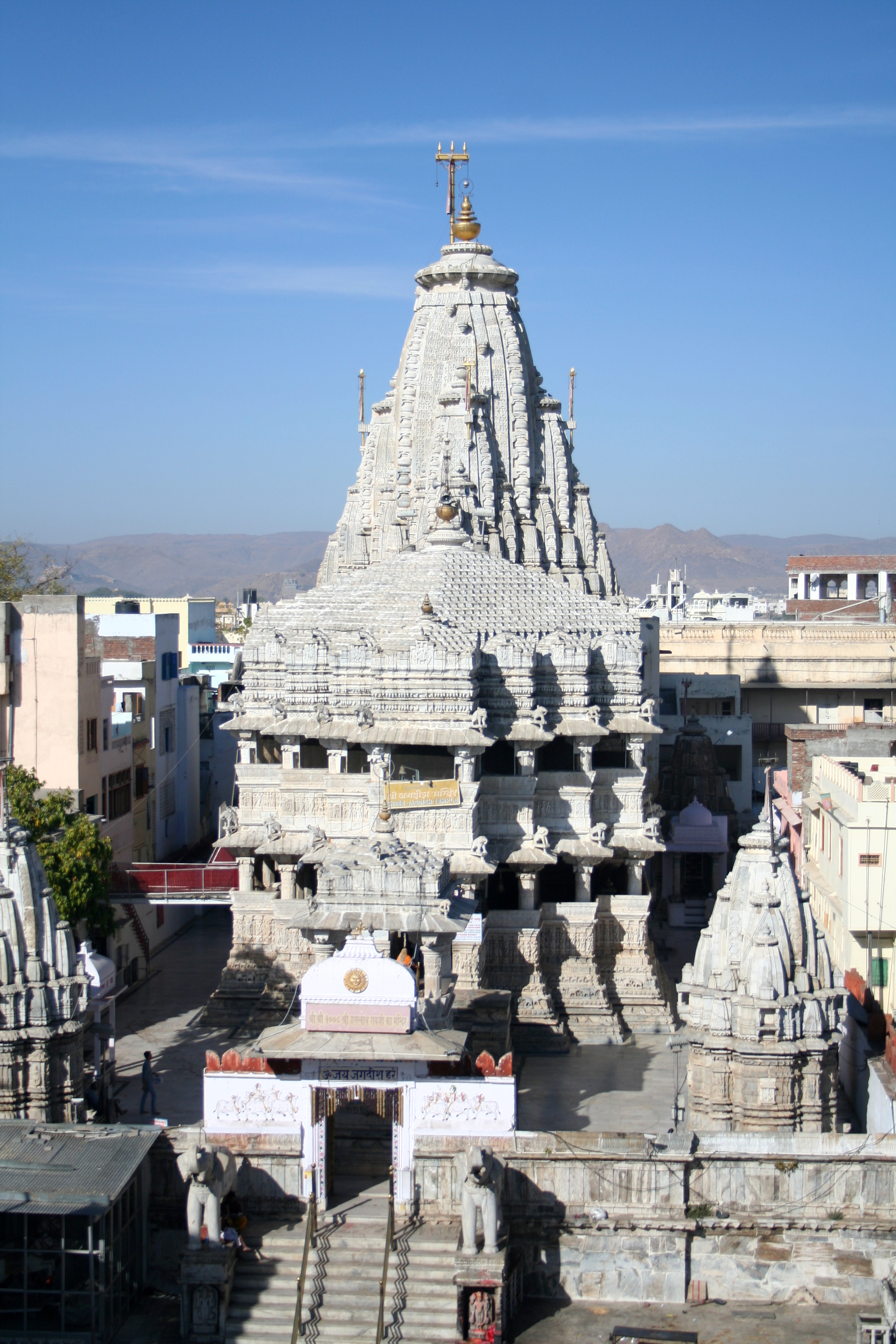

- Location in Udaipur

Religion
- Affiliation: Hinduism
- District: Udaipur district

Location
- Location: Udaipur
- State: Rajasthan
- Country: India
- Coordinates: 24°34′47.4024″N 73°41′1.899″E

Jagdish Temple is a large Hindu temple in the middle of Udaipur in Rajasthan, just outside the royal palace. It has been in continuous worship since 1651. A big tourist attraction, the temple was originally called the temple of Jagannath Rai but is now called Jagdish-ji. It is a major monument in Udaipur.

== Overview ==
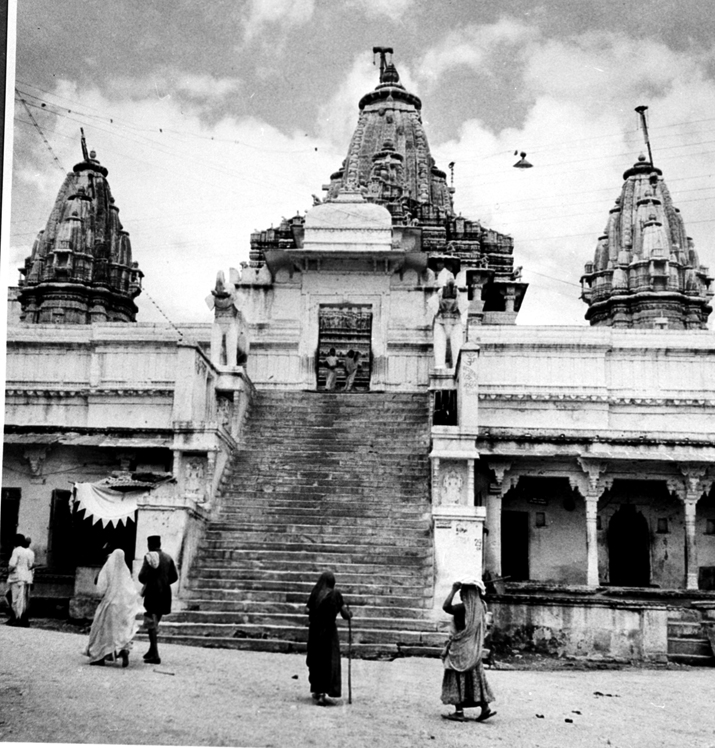
Jagdish Temple in 1949

The Jagdish Temple is built on a tall terrace and was completed in 1651 by Maharana Jagat Singh. It attaches a double-storey Mandapa (hall) to a double-storey saandhara (with a covered ambulatory) sanctum. The mandapa has another storey tucked within its pyramidal samavarna (bellroof) while the hollow clustered spire over the sanctum contains two more, nonfunctional stories. To reach the main shrine, one must climb 32 marble steps, intercepted by a brass image of Garuda in the end, being the mount (vahana) of Vishnu. The temple sanctum has an idol of the deity Jagannath, the local name for Vishnu or Krishna, carved out of a single black stone, resplendent with four arms, flowers and finery. The temple features three stories of hand-carved stone, and a steeple of approximately 79 feet. It is the largest temple in Udaipur. It is an example of either Māha Māru or Māru-Gurjara architecture, decorated with ornate carvings.

Lanes taking off from many of the sheharpanah (city wall) converge on the Jagdish Temple. A major event in the temple is the annual Rath Yatra.

== Gallery ==
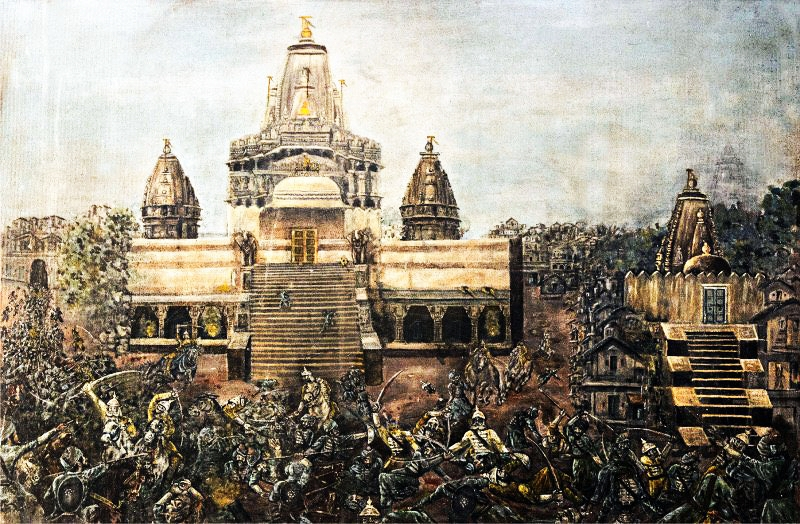
a painting at jagdish temple depicts charan warrior naruji barhat and his 20 warriors fighting with mughals to protect jagdish temple.

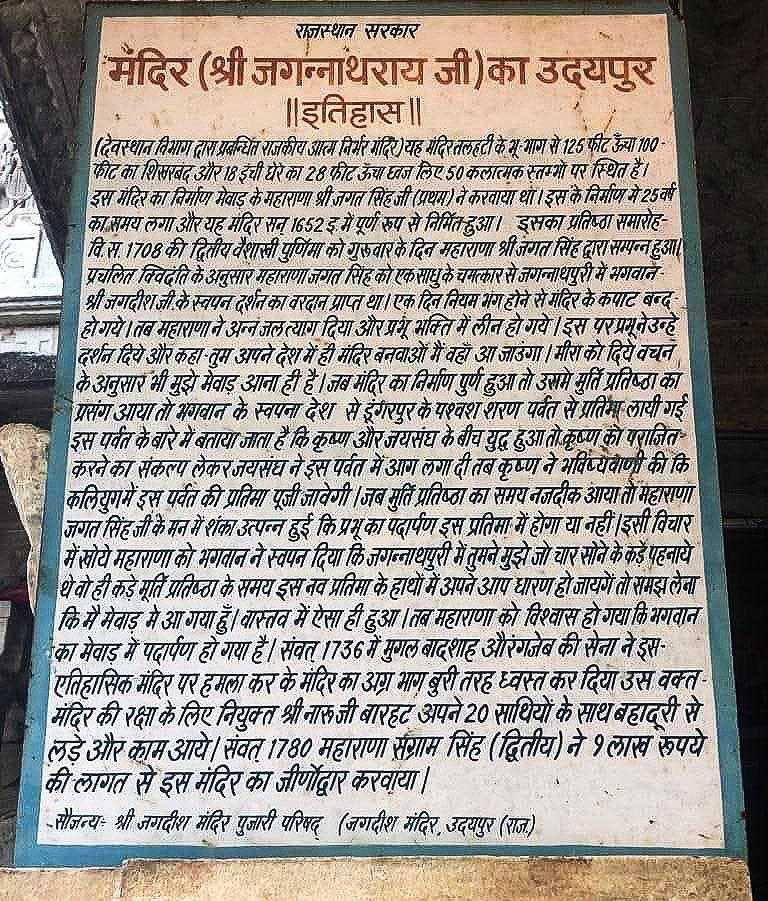
A historical information board at Jagdish Temple, Udaipur. It describes the temple's construction in 1652 AD and its defense by charan Naruji Barhat and his 20 warriors during the Mughal invasion in 1680.

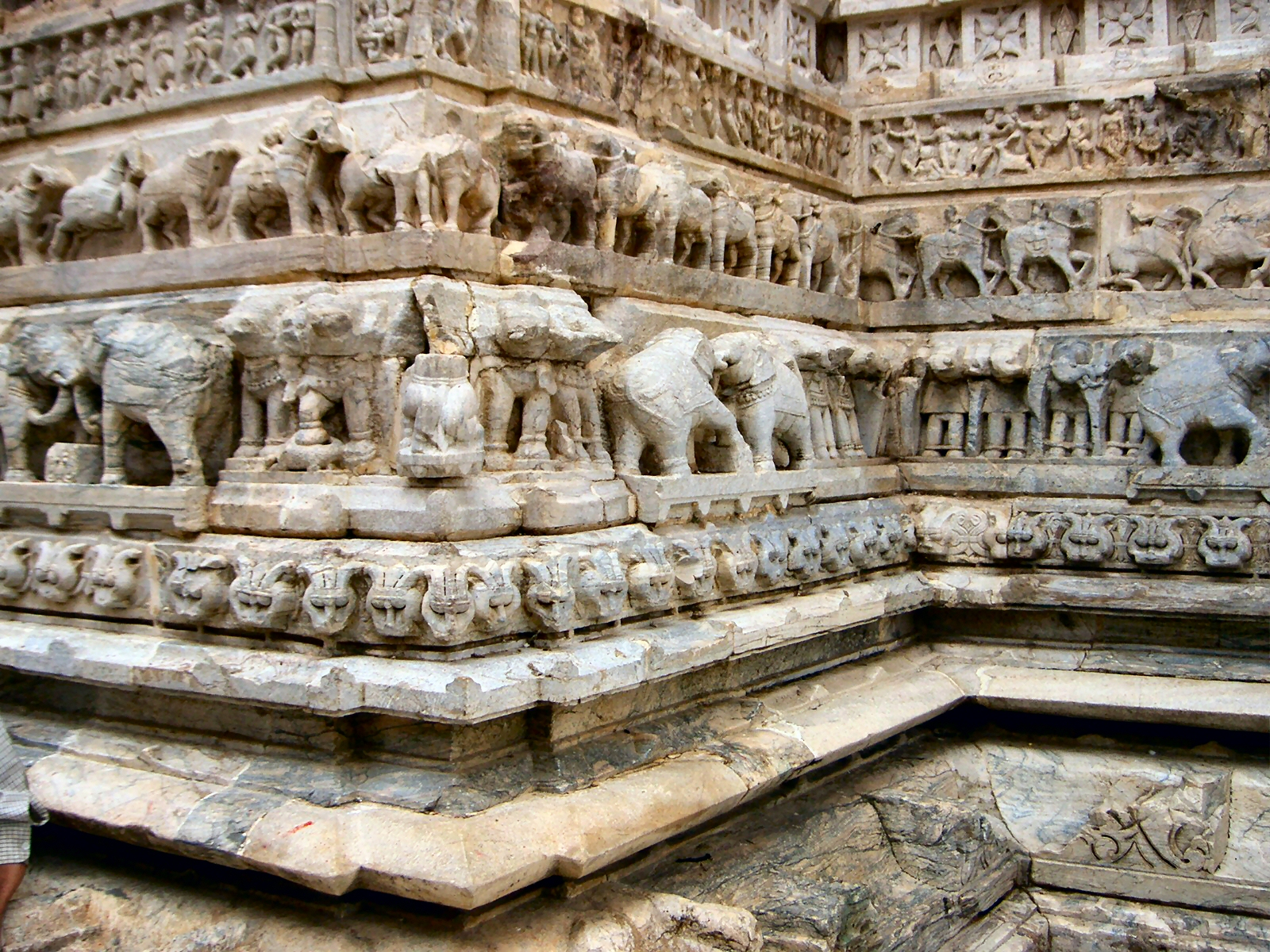
Elephant carvings on Jagdish Mandir

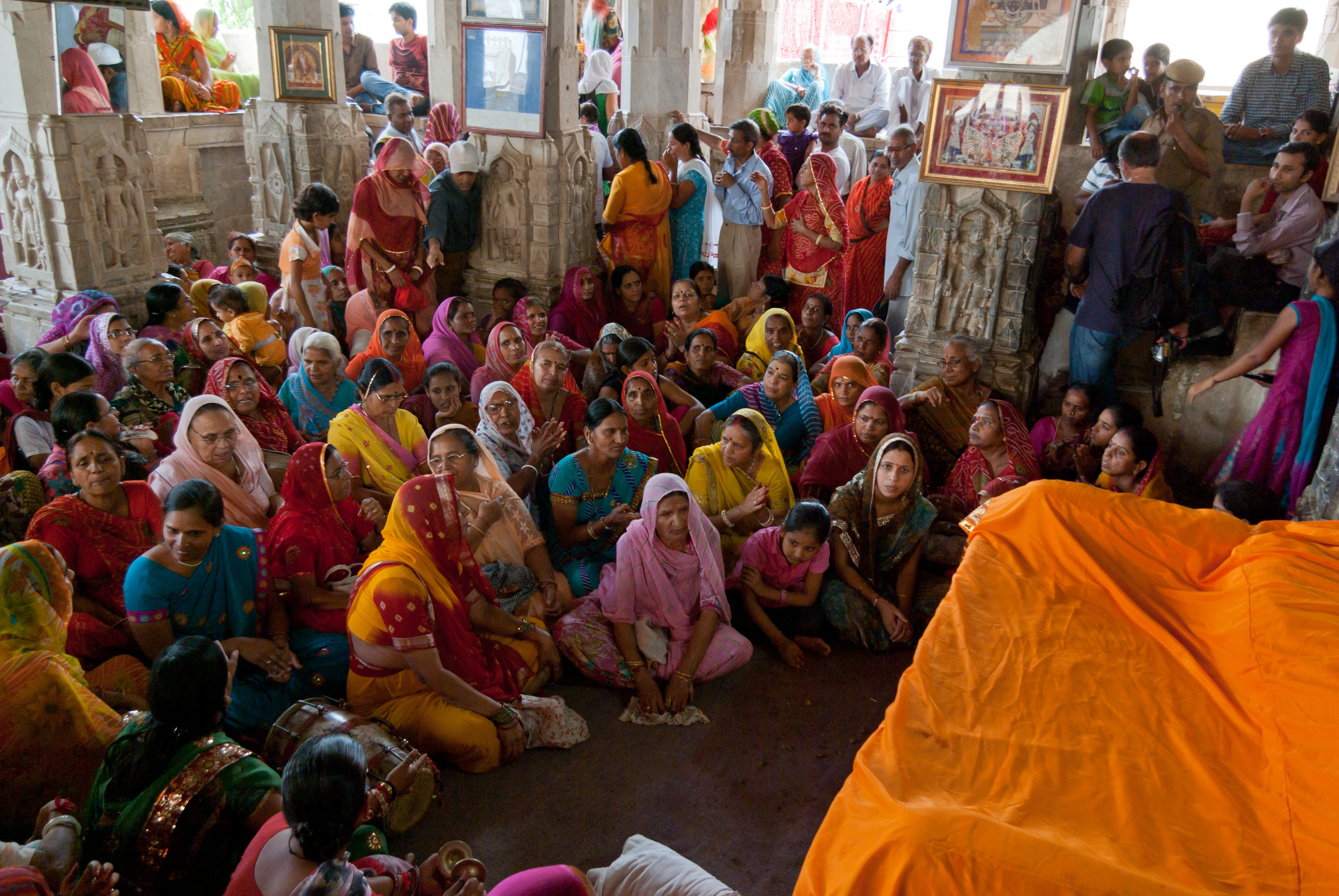
Women during a prayer

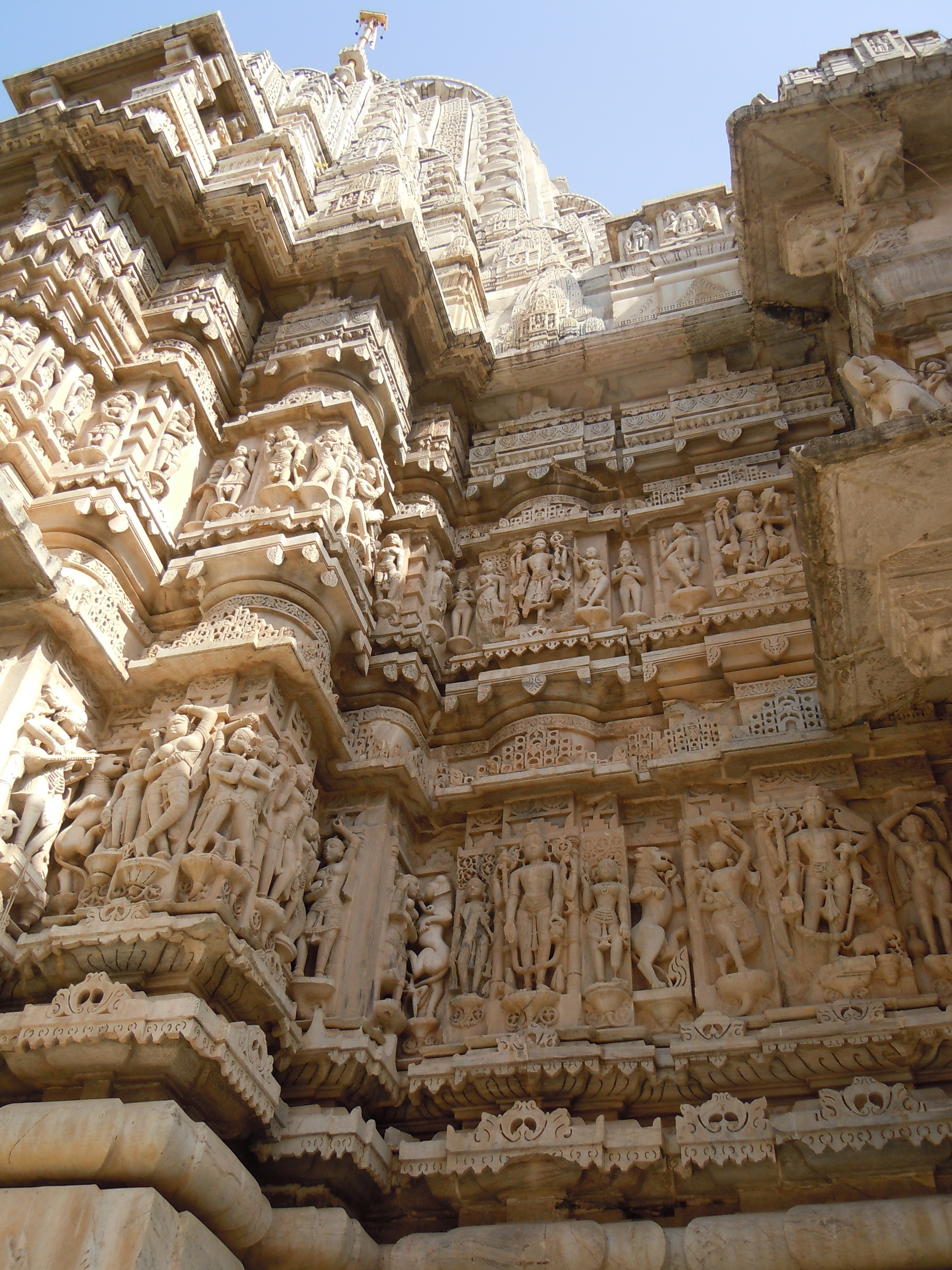
Mural Statues and Sculptures

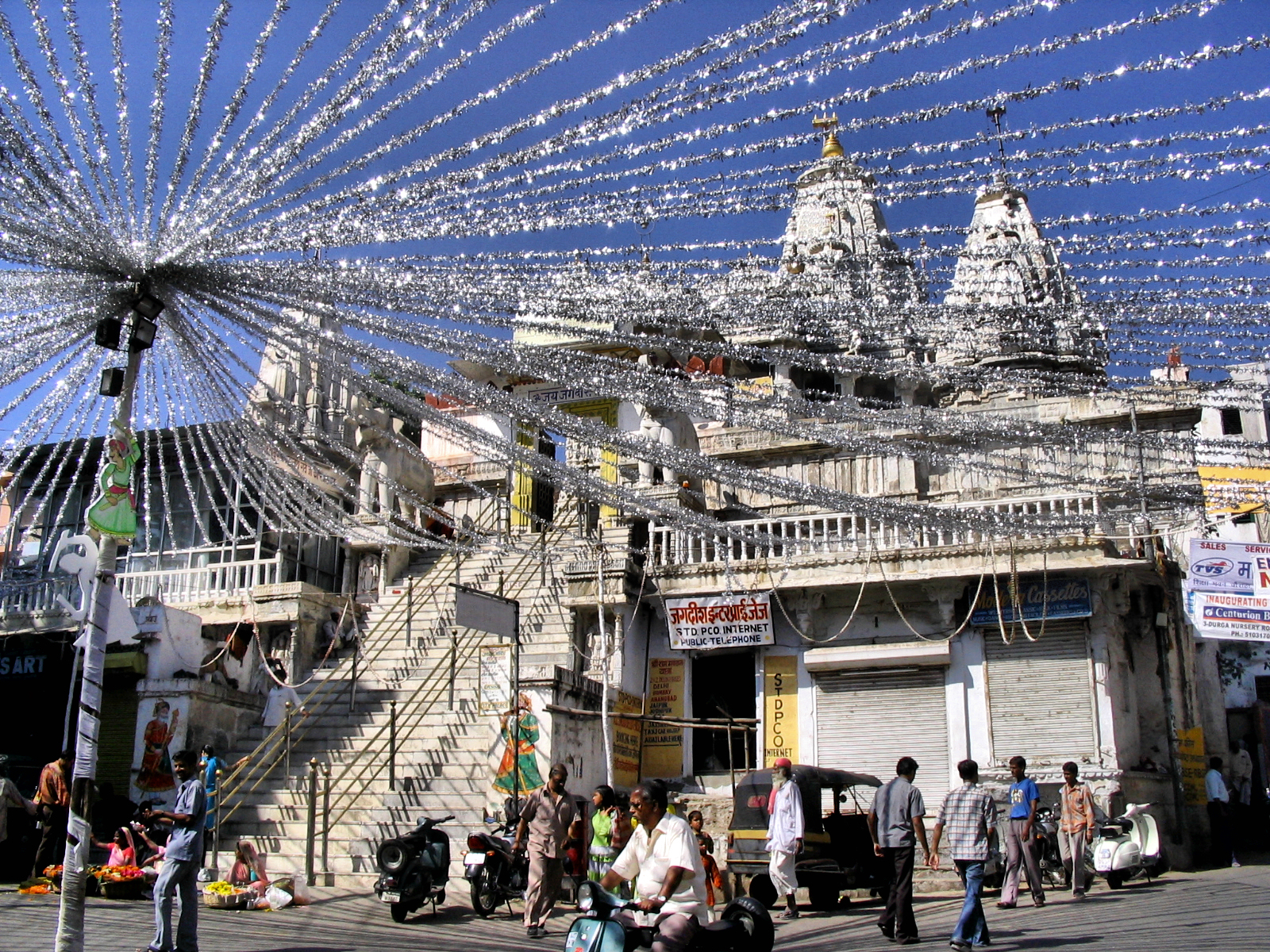
festive decorations

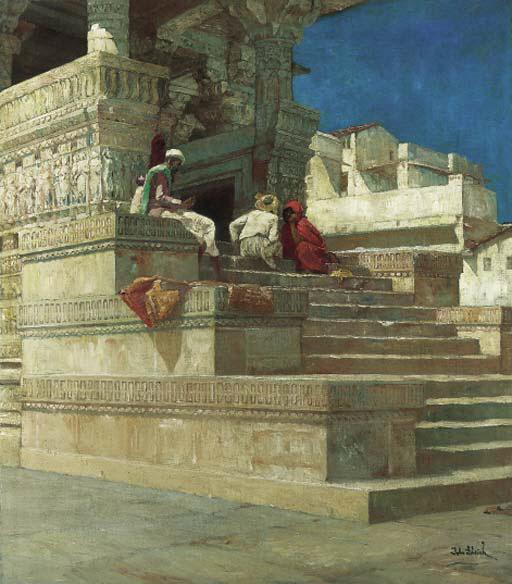
Painting by John Gleich (1879 - c.1927)

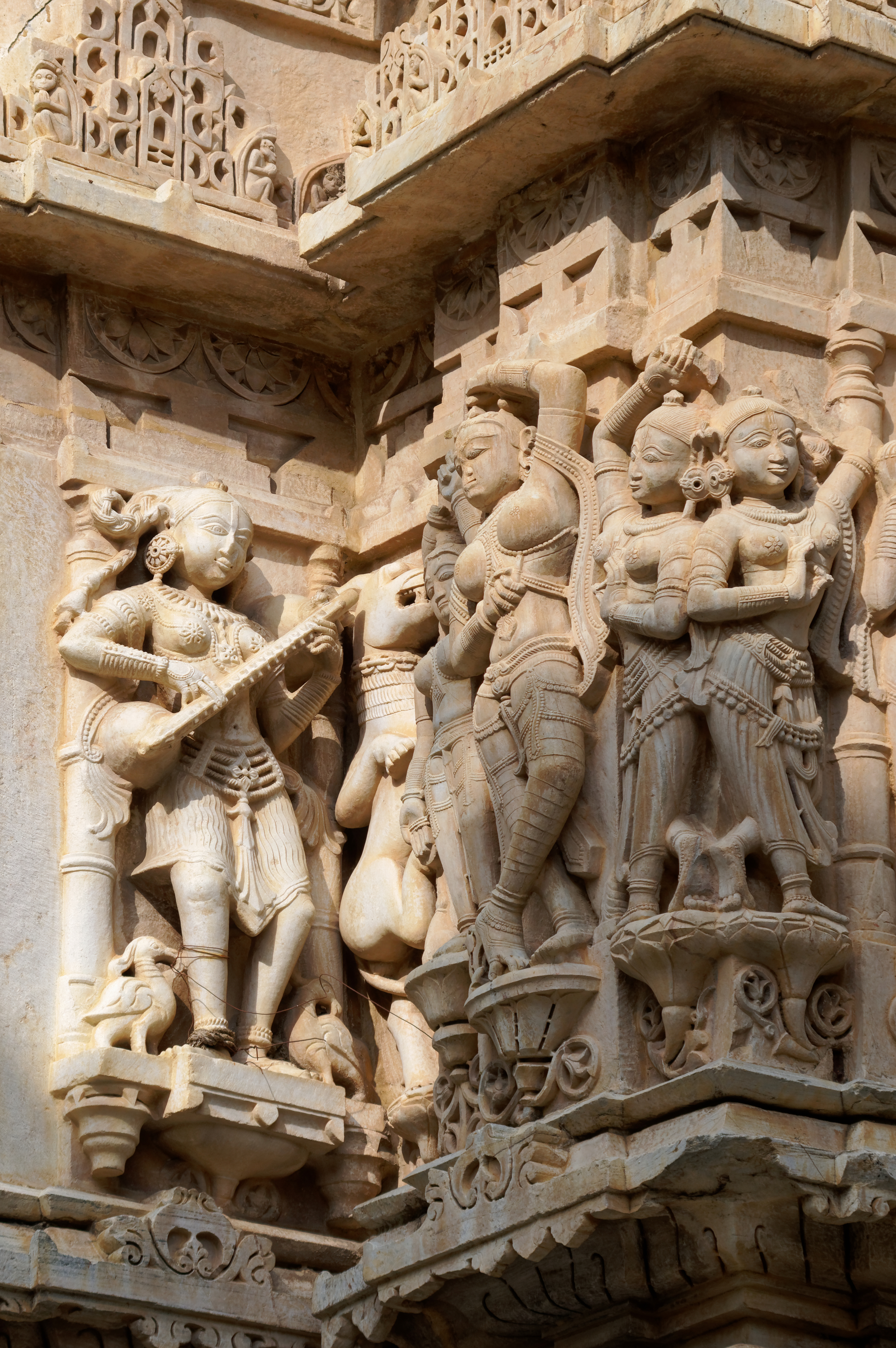
Sculptures on wall. Instrument resembling Rudra veena, far left.

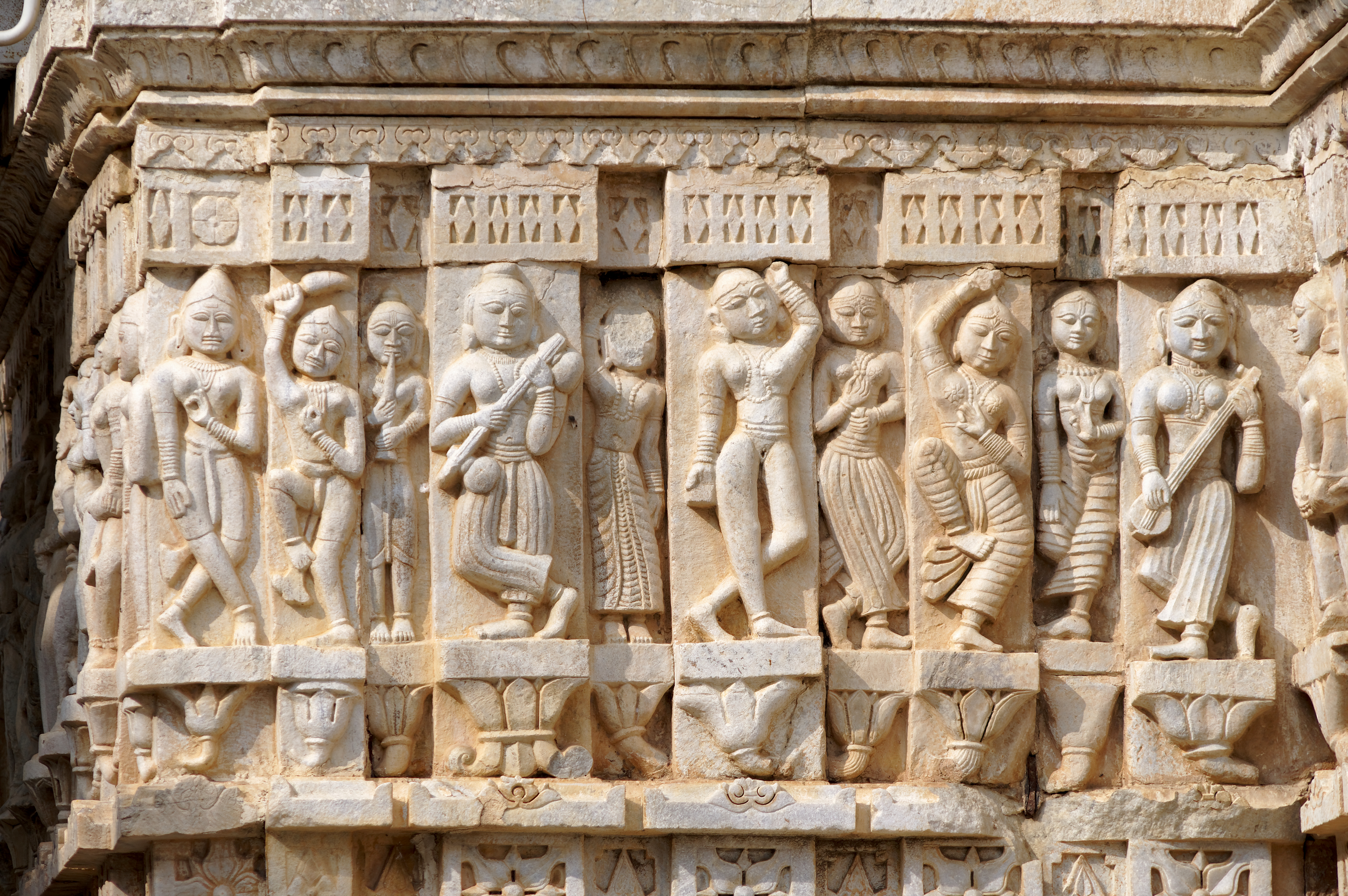
Sculptures of musicians and dancers.

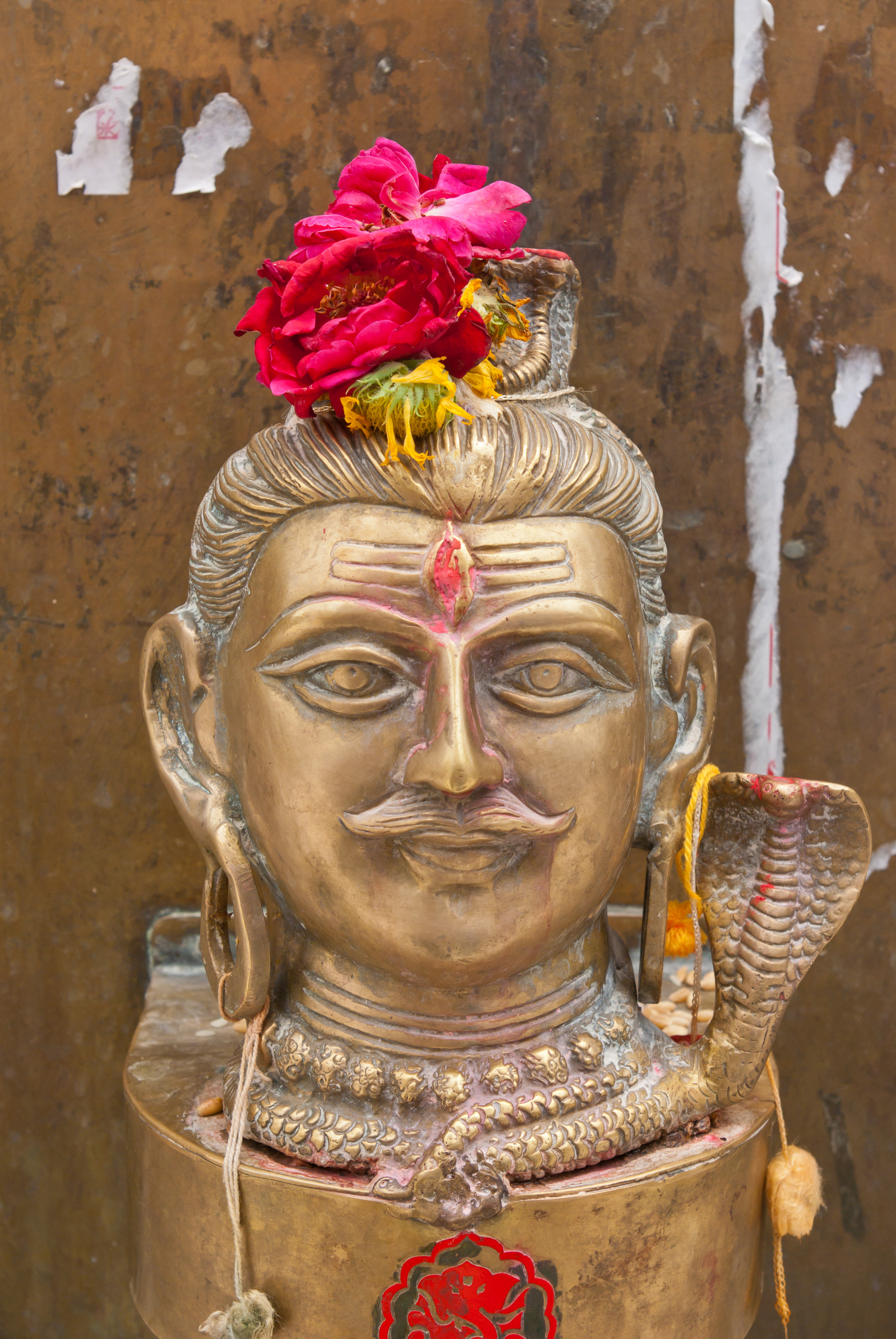
God Shiva in the temple.

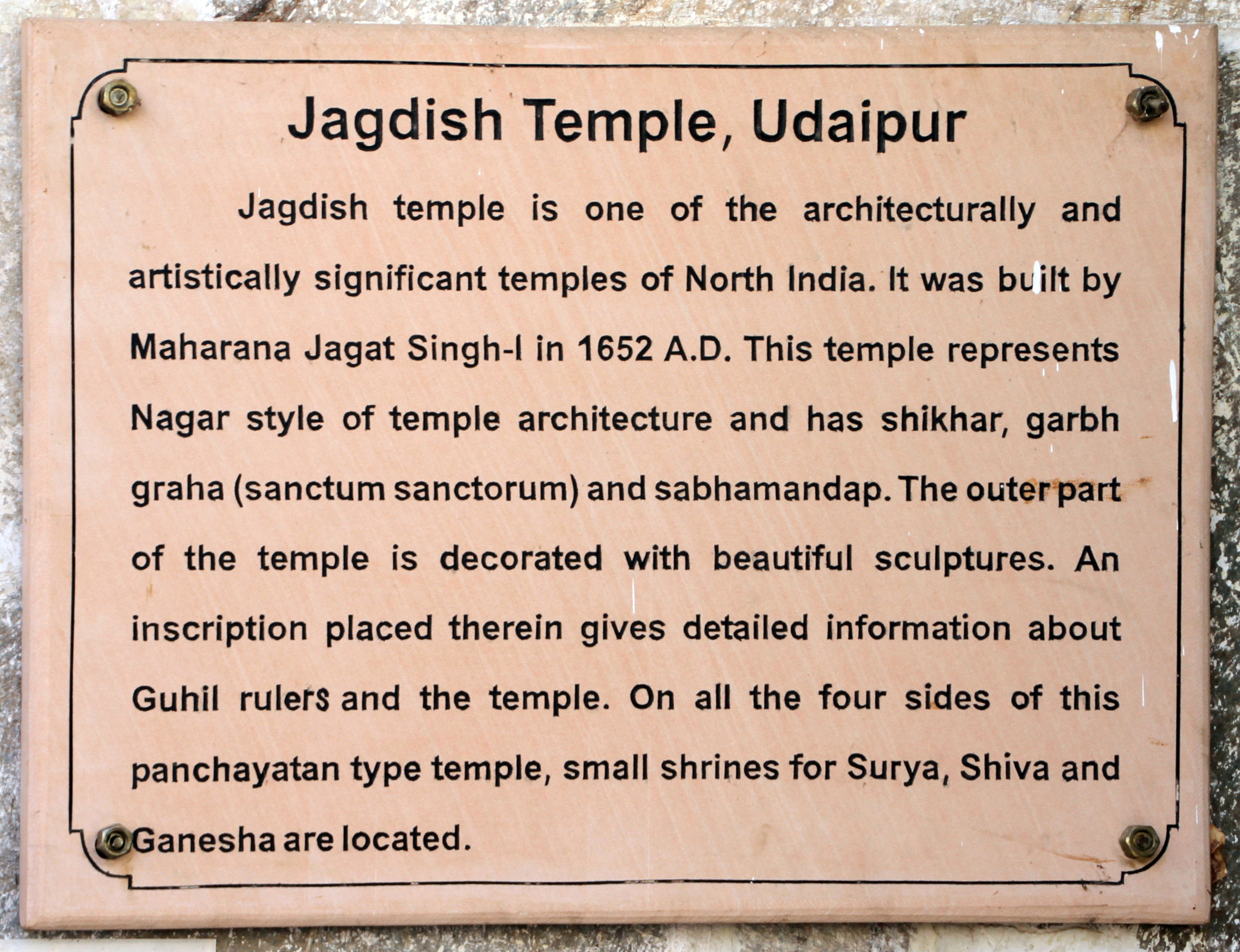
Stone inscription about the temple.

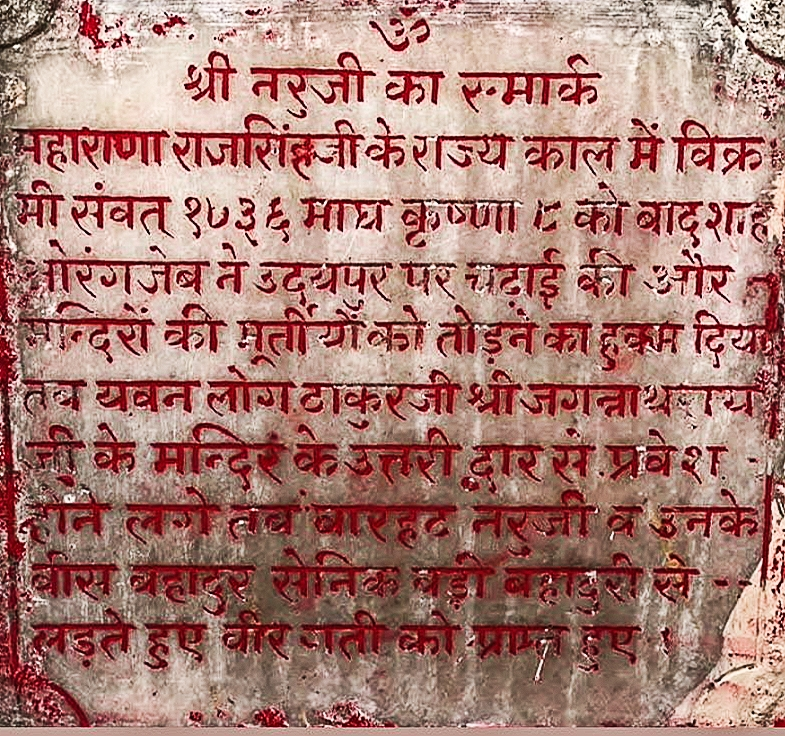
inscription of naruji barhat at jagdish temple.
