= Veiel =

Veiel is a German surname. Notable people with the surname include:

- Albert Veiel (1806–1874), German dermatologist
- Andres Veiel (born 1959), German film director and screenwriter
- Rudolf Veiel (1883–1956), German military officer
