= Staatstheater Stuttgart =

Theatre in Germany

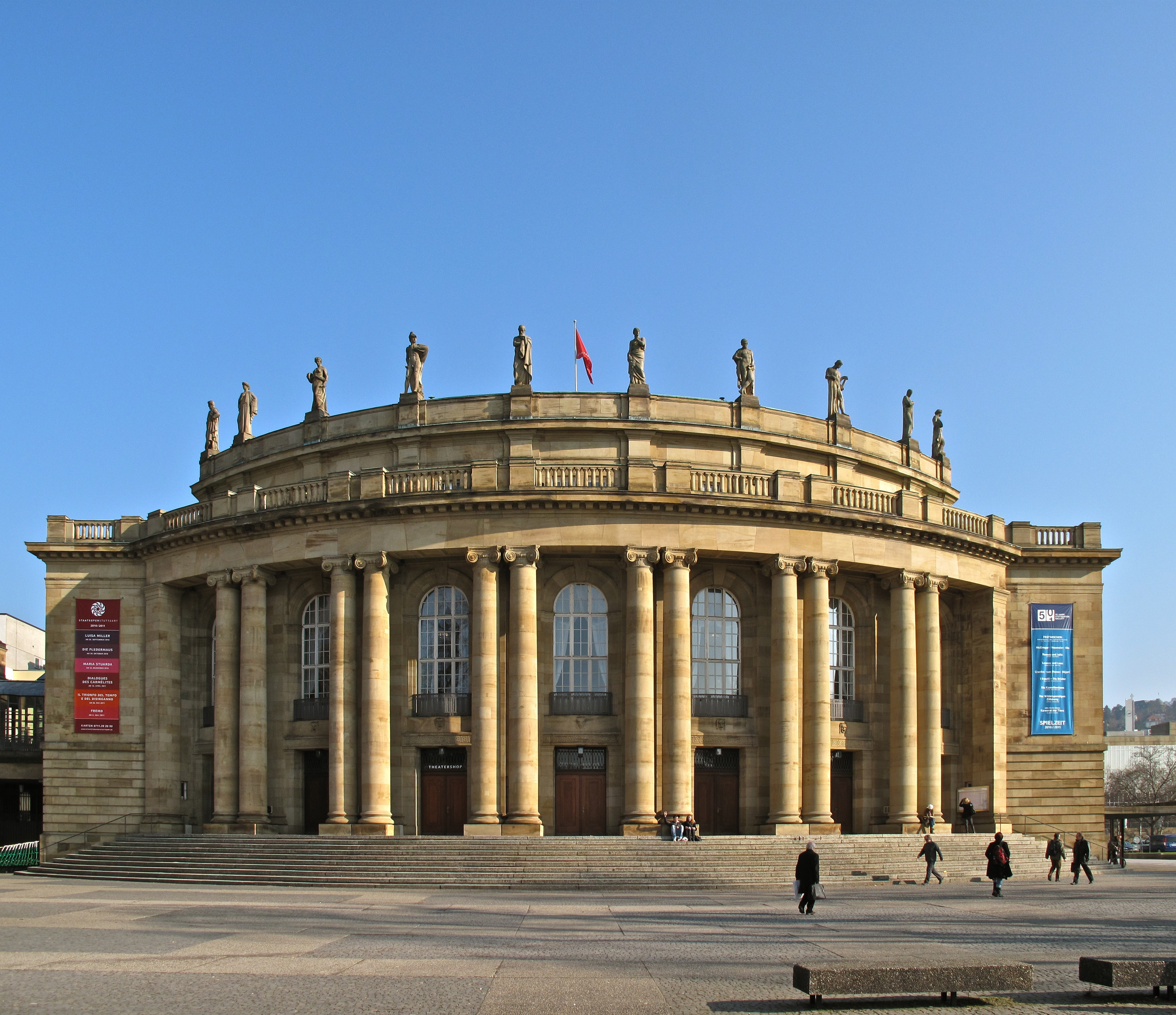
- Staatstheater Stuttgart, Opera house
- Interactive map of Staatstheater Stuttgart
- Address: Oberer Schloßgarten 6
- Location: Stuttgart, Germany
- Coordinates: 48°46′49″N 9°11′06″E
- Type: Theatre

Construction
- Groundbreaking: 1909
- Built: 1912
- Architect: Max Littmann

Website
- staatstheater-stuttgart.com

The Staatstheater Stuttgart (Stuttgart State Theatre) comprises two venues: the Stuttgart Opera House (Opernhaus or Großes Haus) and the newer, smaller Stuttgart Drama Theatre (Schauspielhaus or Kleines Haus), both located in the German city of Stuttgart, in the state of Baden-Württemberg. The opera house is used mainly by the Stuttgart Opera (Staatsoper Stuttgart) and the Stuttgart Ballet, while plays are presented in the smaller theatre.

== Architecture ==
Designed by the noted Munich architect Max Littmann, who won a competition to create new royal theatres, the building was constructed between 1909 and 1912 as the Königliche Hoftheater, royal theatre of the Kingdom of Württemberg with a Grosses Haus (large house) and a Kleines Haus (small house).

In 1919, the theatres were renamed to Landestheater, and later Staatstheater. The house for drama theatre, Kleines Haus, was destroyed by bombing during World War II, and today, the site is occupied by a new Kleines Haus, designed by Hans Volkart, which opened in 1962.

The Opera House (Grosses Haus), is one of only a few German opera houses to survive the bombing of World War II. Between 1982 and 1984, extensive work restored the venue to its original condition and it now seats 1,404. In 2001, the theatre buildings were renamed Opernhaus and Schauspielhaus.

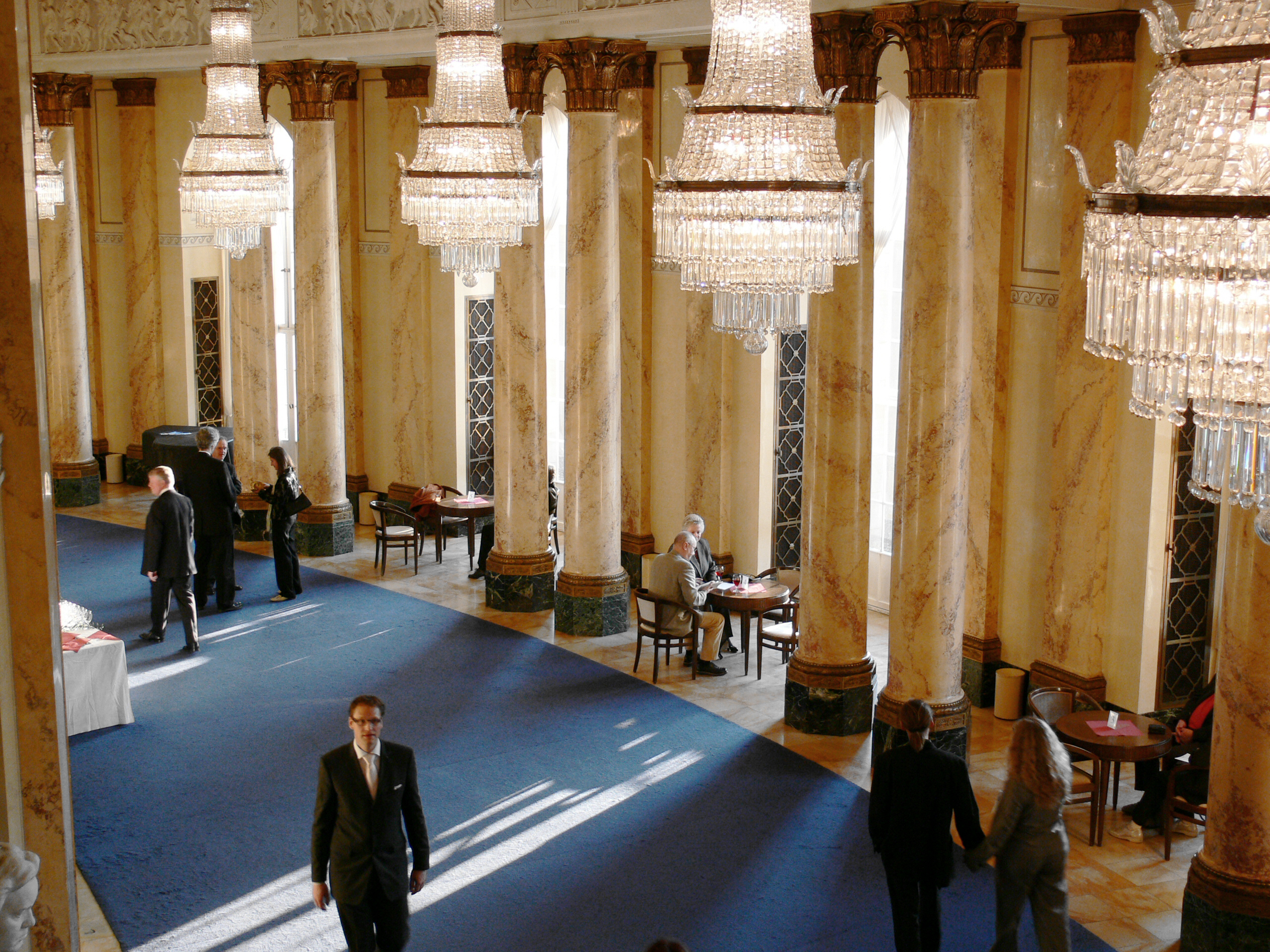
Foyer

== General directors ==
Walter Erich Schäfer was managing director from 1949 to 1972.

As of 2015, three general directors are collectively responsible for the Staatstheater Stuttgart: Jossi Wieler (Oper Stuttgart), Reid Anderson (Stuttgart Ballet), and Armin Petras (Schauspiel Stuttgart), and the managing director Marc-Oliver Hendriks. General directors, especially artistic directors of operas or drama theatres, are called Intendant in Germany.

Canadian dancer Reid Anderson became director of the ballet in the 1996/1997 season.

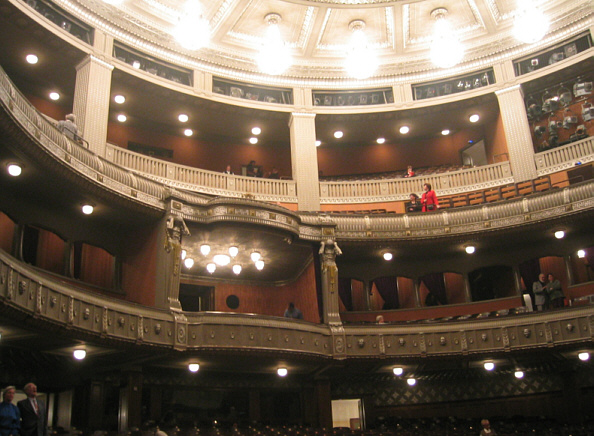
Grosses Haus in 2003

== See also ==
- Staatsoper Stuttgart
- List of opera houses
- Staatstheater Stuttgart collections at Staatsarchiv Ludwigsburg
