= Staatsarchiv Ludwigsburg =

Public institutional repository in Germany

- Logo

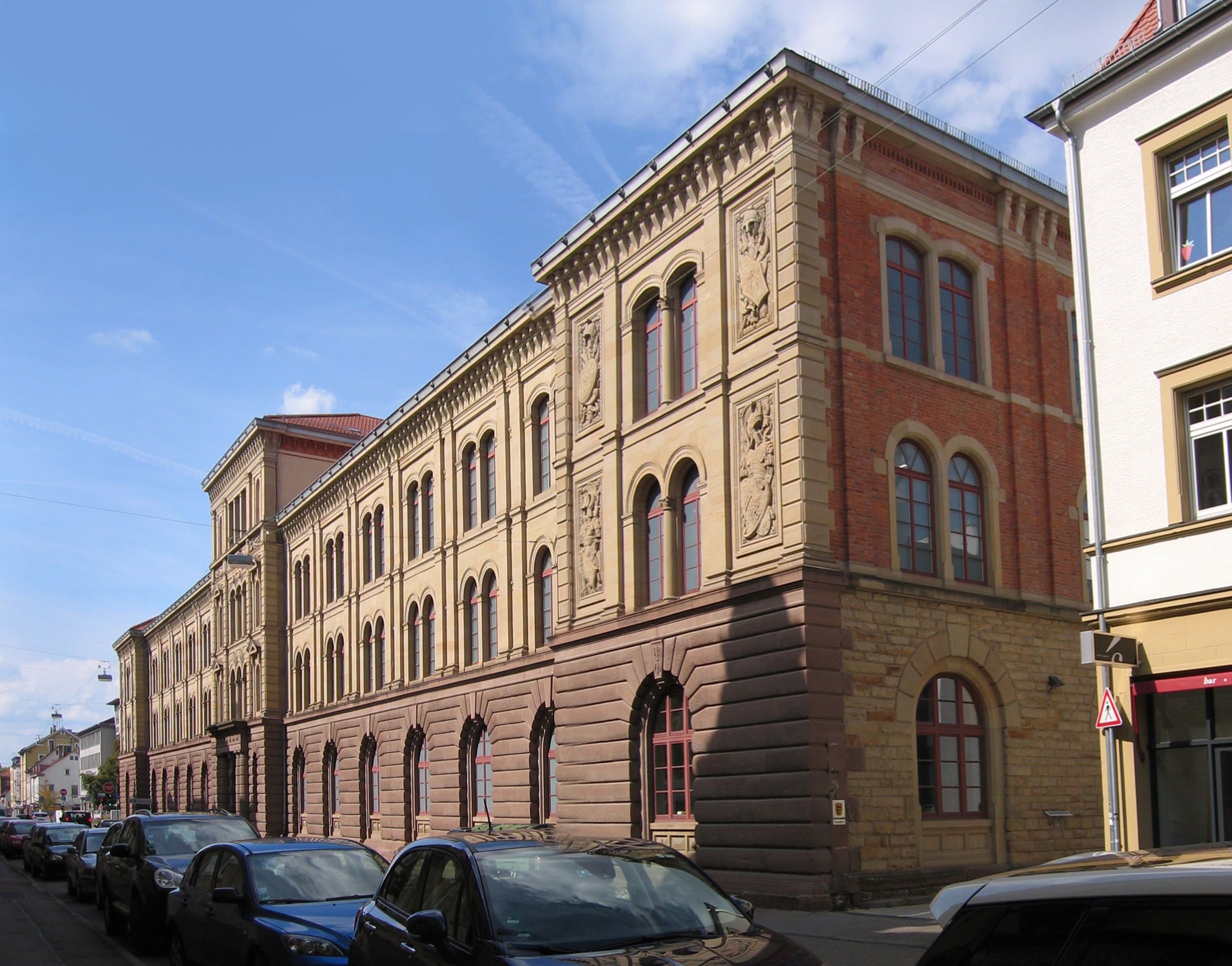
- Zeughaus, Mathildenstraße 1, Ludwigsburg

Agency overview
- Jurisdiction: Landesarchiv Baden-Württemberg (de)
- Headquarters: Arsenalplatz 3 Ludwigsburg Germany
- Agency executive: Landesarchiv Baden-Württemberg (de) Gerald Maier (Note: Gerald Maier (born 1966), since 2007 as lecturer and since July 2013 as Honorary Professor, also teaches at the State Academy of Fine Arts Stuttgart in the masters program for the Conservation of New Media and Digital Information. He earned his PhD in 1997 from the University of Tübingen. He is a scholar in history, Protestant theology, art history, and historical geography.) President Nicole Bickhoff (Note: Nicole Bickhoff (Nicole Bickhoff-Böttcher) is also a lecturer at the University of Tübingen. She earned her PhD in 1984 from the University of Osnabrück. She has been an archivist since 1987, Deputy President since 2000, and Department Head of Hauptstaatsarchiv Stuttgart (de) since 2006.) Deputy President Staatsarchiv Ludwigsburg Peter Müller Head Stephan Molitor Deputy Head
- Website: www.landesarchiv-bw.de/web/49677

The Staatsarchiv Ludwigsburg (Ludwigsburg State Archives), located in Ludwigsburg, Germany, is a public institutional repository for roughly 680 state authorities within the District of Stuttgart, Germany.

== Holdings ==
The historical holdings come from the North Württemberg (de) area. Notable holdings, unveiled through the process of denazification, include documents related to the Holocaust (more than 500,000).

The archives also house the files of the Police Headquarters Stuttgart (de), the decorative folders and role books of the Staatstheater Stuttgart and all birth records of the Landesfrauenklinik Stuttgart (Stuttgart Women's State Hospital); the documents of the Teutonic Order, official books of the convent Ellwangen and documents of Ulm, Esslingen am Neckar, Heilbronn, and other former free imperial cities. The collections also include personnel files of the Deutsche Reichsbahn (the German National Railway) and the Deutsche Bundesbahn (the German Federal Railway) from the Reichsbahndirektion/Bundesbahndirektion Stuttgart (de) (Federal Railway Directorate).

== Facilities ==
The Ludwigsburg State Archives relocated, in 1995, from a castle to the Arsenal Barracks and Armory located in the center of Ludwigsburg.

1. The Arsenal Barracks (Arsenalkaserne) houses the public areas – including a reading room, an auditorium, an exhibition room, library, and an administration office
2. The Armory (Zeughaus) houses the stacks, which comprise more than 40,000 metres (130,000 ft) of archives

Both buildings were mechanically and structurally re-purposed to meet the safekeeping requirements of modern archives. The buildings are connected by an underground corridor, through which a transport system delivers documents to researchers in the reading room.

== Governmental oversight ==
As part of the Baden-Württemberg administrative reorganization of 2005, Staatsarchiv Ludwigsburg has been a department of the newly created Landesarchiv Baden-Württemberg (de) (Baden-Württemberg State Archives), which was inaugurated January 1, 2005. Staatsarchiv Ludwigsburg is one of eight constituent departments of Landesarchiv Baden-Württemberg (de). Six of the eight departments have an archival mission and two have a service mission.

Archive departments:

Department 1: Staatsarchiv Freiburg (de)
Department 2: Generallandesarchiv Karlsruhe (de)
Department 3: Staatsarchiv Ludwigsburg with the branch, Hohenlohe-Zentralarchiv Neuenstein (de)
Department 4: Staatsarchiv Sigmaringen (de)
Department 5: Hauptstaatsarchiv Stuttgart (de)
Department 6: Staatsarchiv Wertheim

Service departments

Department 7: Central Services with Institute for the Preservation of Archives and Library Goods
Department 8: Archival Principle with Land Registry (de) Central Archives of Kornwestheim

The Landesarchiv is a supreme state authority in the portfolio of the Ministry of Science, Research and Art in Baden-Wuerttemberg (de).

== Gallery ==
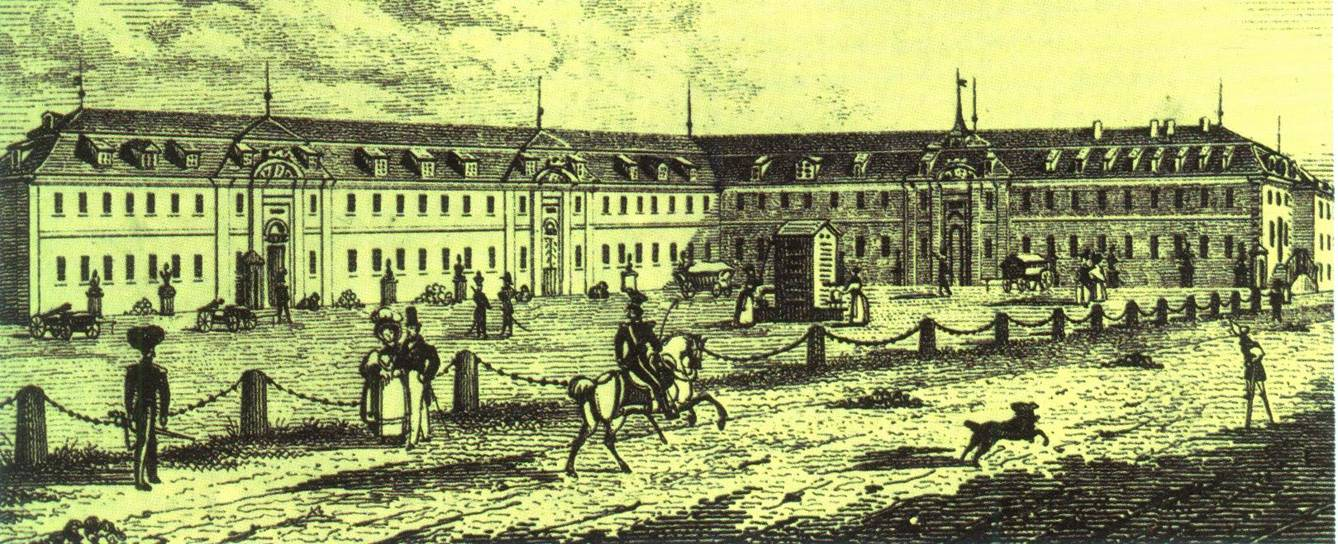
Arsenal Building
(Guard barracks, horse barracks)
Arsenalplatz 3, Ludwigsburg
(historic engraving, before 1870)

== See also ==
- Stadtarchiv Stuttgart (de) (City Archives of Stuttgart)
