= Walter Erich Schäfer =

German writer and film director (1901–1981)

Walter Erich Schäfer (16 March 1901 in Hemmingen – 28 December 1981 in Stuttgart) was a German writer and film director. He worked from 1949 to 1972 Generalintendant (managing director) of the Staatstheater Stuttgart, responsible for opera, play and the Stuttgart Ballet.

== Works ==
Plays

- Echnathon, 1925 (Engelhorn Verlag)
- Richter Feuerbach, 1930 (Engelhorn Verlag)
- Der 18. Oktober, 1932 (Dieck Verlag)
- Schwarzmann und die Magd, 1933 (Engelhorn Verlag)
- Der Kaiser und der Löwe, 1934 (Dietzmann-Verlag)
- Das Feuer, 1934 (Dietzmann-Verlag)
- Die Reise nach Paris, 1936 (Dietzmann-Verlag)
- Die Kette, 1938 (Dietzmann-Verlag)
- Der Leutnant Vary, 1940 (Dietzmann-Verlag) / also as Der Leutnant Rougier
- Theres und die Hoheit, 1940 (Dietzmann-Verlag), filmed
- Die Verschwörung, 1949 (Dietzmann-Verlag)
- Hora Mortis, 1948 (Deutsche Verlagsanstalt)

Audio plays

- Malmgreen, 1925, in: „Sprich, damit ich dich sehe“, Frühe Hörspiele, 1962 (Paul List Verlag), tape (SDR/SWR)
- Die fünf Sekunden des Mahatma Gandhi, 1948 (Europ. Verlagsanstalt, Hörspielbuch 1), tape (SDR/SWR)
- Der Staatssekretär, ca. 1949, manuscript and tape (SDR/SWR)
- Konferenz in Christobal, ca. 1950, manuscript (SDR/SWR)
- Spiel der Gedanken, 1951 (Europ. Verlagsanstalt, Hörspielbuch)
- Die Himmelfahrt des Physikers M.N. 1958 (Europ. Verlagsanstalt, Hörspielbuch)
- Die Nacht im Hotel, 1966, manuscript (SDR/SWR)

Prose

- Die zwölf Stunden Gottes. Erzählung. Engelhorn Verlag, 1925.
- Letzte Wandlung. Novellen. Engelhorn Verlag, 1928.
- Das Regimentsfest. Erzählung. Engelhorn Verlag, 1933.
- Die Heimkehrer. Erzählungen. Staakmannverlag, 1944.
- Bühne eines Lebens. memoir. Deutsche Verlagsanstalt, 1975, ISBN 3-421-01733-6.
- Kleine Wellen auf dem Fluß des Lebens. memoir. Deutsche Verlagsanstalt, 1976.
- Die Mutter des Schauspielers. novel. Deutsche Verlagsanstalt, 1981, ISBN 3-421-06052-5.

Bildbände and monographies

- Günter Rennert, Regisseur in dieser Zeit. Schünemann Verlag, 1962
- Martha Mödl. Friedrichverlag, 1967
- Wieland Wagner. Persönlichkeit und Leistung. Rainer Wunderlich Verlag, 1970
- Die Stuttgarter Staatsoper 1950–1972. Neskeverlag, 1972, ISBN 3-7885-0023-9
- John Cranko, Walter Erich Schäfer: Über den Tanz. Gespräche mit Walter Erich Schäfer. S. Fischer Verlag, 1974, ISBN 3-10-014301-9

Collection

- Schauspiele, Hörspiele (plays, audio plays) in two volumes2 Bände, Deutsche Verlagsanstalt 1967

== Sources ==
- Paul Eiermann: Geschichte der Landwirtschaftlichen Hochschule Hohenheim und des Hohenheimer S. C. Chronik der beiden Hohenheimer Corps "Germania" und "Suevia" zum 90. Stiftungsfest der "Germania". Stuttgart-Hohenheim 1961.
- Manfred G. Raupp: Fuchsenfibel des Corps Germania Hohenheim 2006.

== Literature ==
- John Cranko: Über den Tanz. Gespräche mit Walter Erich Schäfer. S. Fischer, Frankfurt am Main 1974
- Ulrike Krone-Balcke (2005). "Schäfer, Walter Erich". Neue Deutsche Biographie (in German). Vol. 22. Berlin: Duncker & Humblot. pp. 513–514. (full text online).
- Ernst Klee: Das Kulturlexikon zum Dritten Reich. Wer war was vor und nach 1945. Fischer, Frankfurt am Main 2007, ISBN 978-3-10-039326-5, p. 513
- Karl Ulrich Majer, Herbert von Strohmer (ed.): Walter Erich Schäfer zum 16. März 1971. Festschrift. Neske, Pfullingen 1971
- Florian Radvan: Eine deutsche Theaterkarriere. Der Dramatiker und Generalintendant Walter Erich Schäfer. Wissenschaftlicher Verlag Trier (WVT), Trier 1999
- Walter Erich Schäfer: Bühne eines Lebens. Erinnerungen. Deutsche Verlags-Anstalt, Stuttgart 1975.
- Alexander Werner: Carlos Kleiber. Eine Biografie. (Darin: Carlos Kleiber und die Württembergische Staatsoper 1964–1975), Schott Music, Mainz 2007
- Heinz Schwitzke: in "Frühe Hörspiele", Paul Listverlag, München 1962
- Michael Molnar, Karlheinz Fuchs: Ausstellungsreihe "Stuttgart im Dritten Reich: Die Machtergreifung", 1983.
- NDB Deutsche Biographie „Walter Erich Schäfer“.
- Alexander Werner: Carlos Kleiber. Eine Biografie. Schott Music

== Documentation ==
- Karl Ulrich Majer (book), Walter Rüdel (direction): Walter Erich Schäfer oder Die Theatertaten eines Gutsherrn aus Niederbayern, ZDF
