= Lustschloss =

Pleasure palace

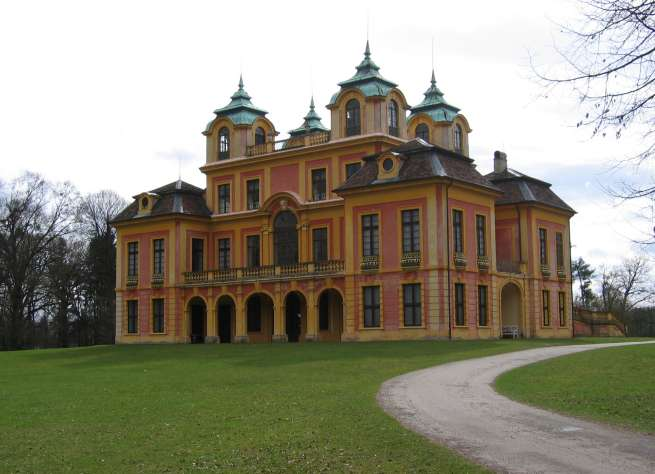
Schloss Favorite in Ludwigsburg

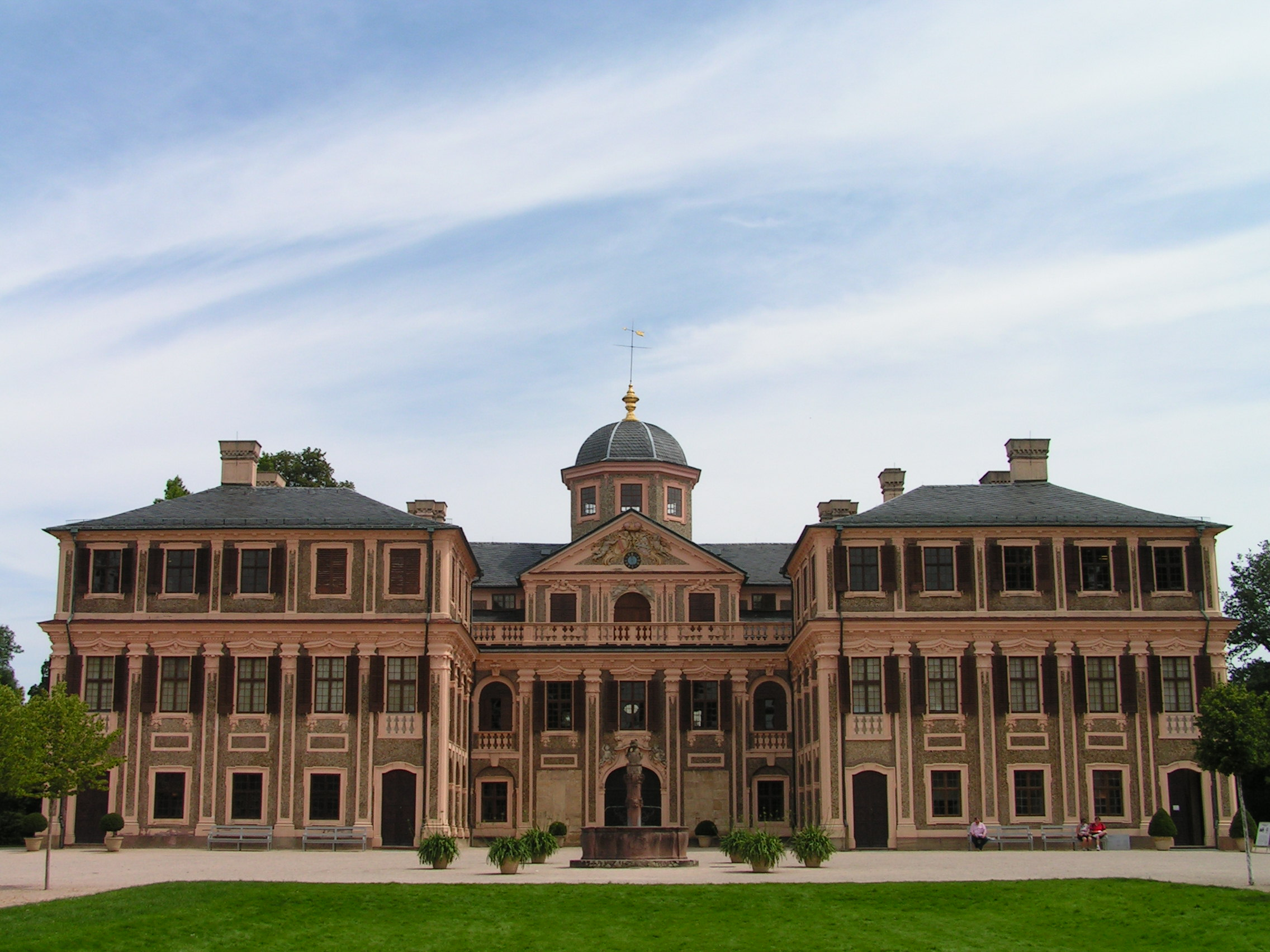
Schloss Favorite in Rastatt

In Renaissance and Early Modern German architecture, a Lustschloss (French: maison de plaisance, both meaning "pleasure palace") is a country house, château, or palace which served the private pleasure of its owner, and was seasonally inhabited as a respite from court ceremonies and state duties. In France, the Château de Madrid in the Bois de Boulogne, easily reached from Paris, arguably set an example, and Louis XIV similarly holidayed annually from the Palace of Versailles to his nearby Château de Marly, and more frequently used his Grand Trianon, to which the Petit Trianon was added in the following century.

There is no common term for such houses in English, and the phenomenon developed especially in the smaller states of Germany, where the ruler was firmly based in one or two main palaces, as opposed to the much larger number available to the monarchies of England, France, and Spain (after Henry VIII's prolific building, Elizabeth I of England had some 40 palaces, most now demolished). But Woodstock Palace seems to have had something of this role; the last monarch to use it was James I of England, in 1603, escaping the plague, which was another useful role these houses played. In France, it was mainly after the monarchy settled at Versailles that the need for them developed. In Italy the term villa covered them.

Lustschloss is often loosely used interchangeably with Jagdschloss, for both served as non-formal residences, but a Jagdschloss was a hunting retreat and was usually used to host a ruler and his hunting party.

== History ==
At the beginning of the Renaissance, a desire for non-military residences arose amongst the nobility and they slowly left their old fortified castles or altered them into stately residences. In the course of the years, many aristocratic family seats grew into big estates; at the same time, the court ceremonial changed. Now, the prince stood more and more in the centre of a luxurious royal household that reached its zenith during the absolutism. The nobility surrounded themselves with artists, courtiers, envoys, servants and petitioners. Often the residences overflowed with guests.

The desire for greater intimacy led to the construction of the Lustschloss, to which often only certain circles of acquaintances were invited. Here its owners could withdraw with their family and relatives. The Lustschloss was above all a place for parties, dancing and music. It was also frequently used for literature and painting. This distinguished it from the main residence, which was often nearby. The latter served the state, in which etiquette had to be protected.

The most popular architectural styles for these particular castles were Baroque and Rococo, which both displayed a sense of wealth. The Lustschloss was often located in a splendid castle park, mostly distinguished by especially extensive and valuable decorations. At the same time the rooms and drawing rooms became more intimate and more comfortable. Significant artists from their respective region would work on many of their paintings in the castle. Famous examples are the Grand Trianon and the Petit Trianon in the gardens of Versailles, the Château de Marly, and the Amalienburg in the Schlosspark of Nymphenburg.

The name Lustschloss was often used interchangeably with the word Schloss, which is the general term for a palace, stately home or manor house. The purpose of a Lustschloss also changed – some were redeveloped over the years and were turned into palaces that took over representative tasks. An example of this is Sanssouci, which was originally established as a summer house, but over a period of time became the main residence of Frederick the Great of Prussia.

Some famous German examples of a Lustschloss are Schloss Benrath in Düsseldorf and Schloss Favorite in Ludwigsburg. The Favorite pleasure palace in Mainz was destroyed during the siege of Mainz (1793).
