= Schloss Favorite, Ludwigsburg =

German Baroque pleasure palace

Schloss Favorite
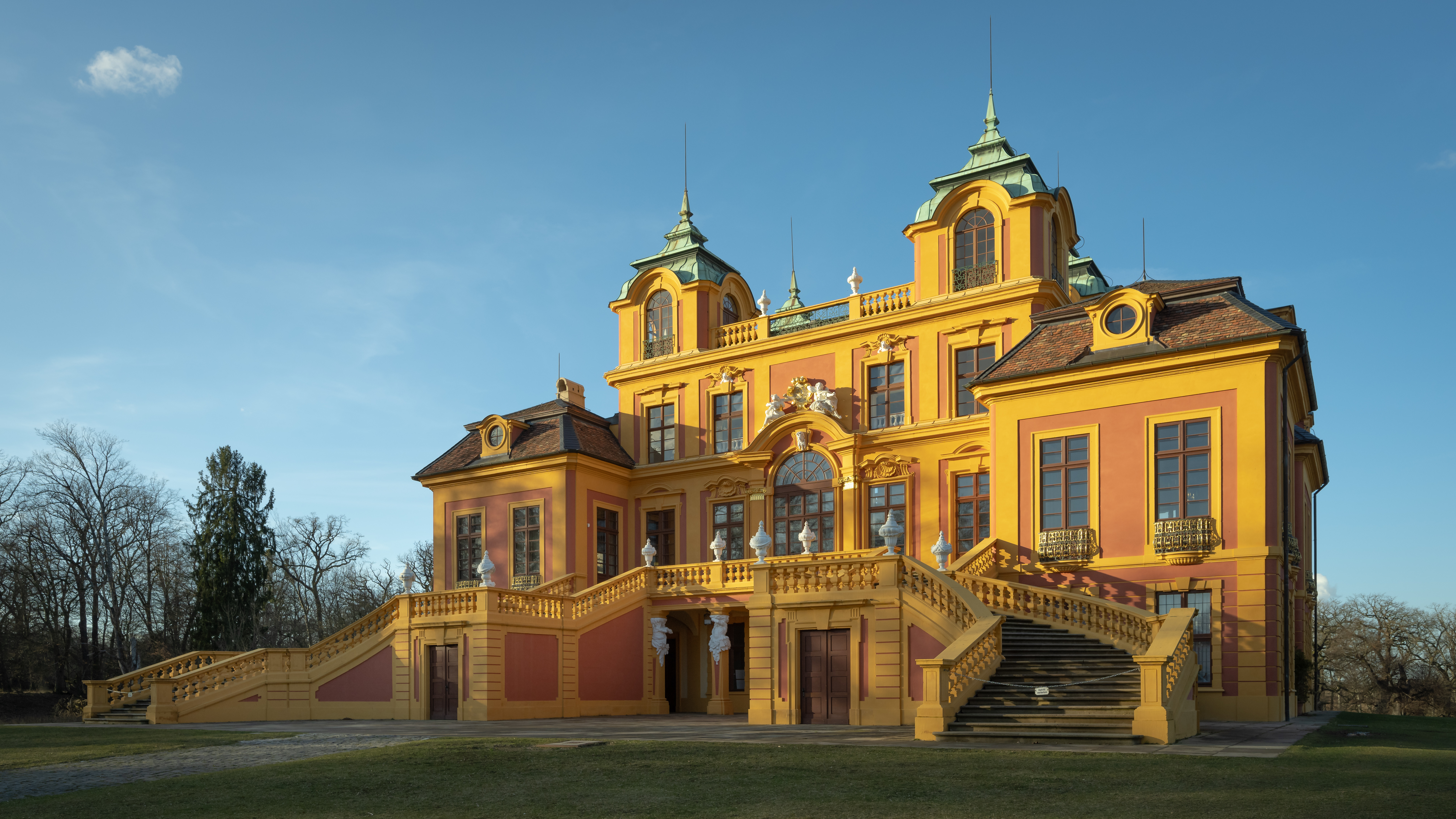
- Schloss Favorite from the south
Map location and basic information
Interactive map of the Schloss Favorite area
General information
| Location | Ludwigsburg, Germany |
| Coordinates | 48°54′16″N 9°11′44″E |
| Construction started | 1717 |
| Completed | 1723 |
| Client | Charles Eugene, Duke of Württemberg |
| Owner | Baden-Württemberg |
Design and construction
| Architect | Philippe de La Guêpière |
Website
www.schloss-favorite-ludwigsburg.de

Schloss Favorite is a Baroque maison de plaisance and hunting lodge in Ludwigsburg, Germany, which was used as a summer residence and hunting lodge. It is located on a rise, directly north of Ludwigsburg Palace, to which it is connected via an avenue.

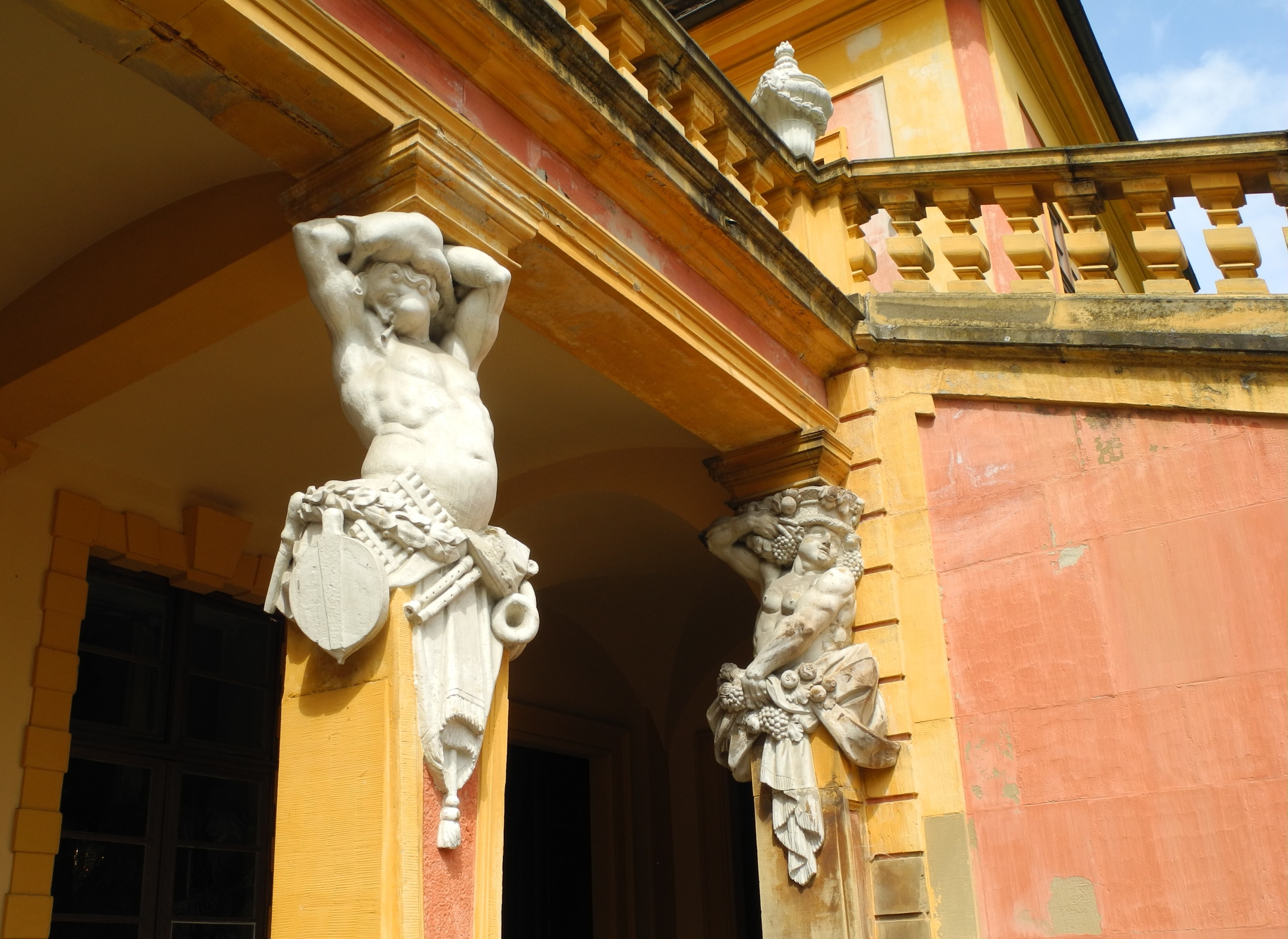
Details of the front

== History ==
Schloss Favorite was built from 1717 to 1723 for the sovereign Duke of Württemberg, Eberhard Ludwig, to a design by Donato Giuseppe Frisoni. The model was the Gartenpalais in Vienna. The original plan provided for combining the functions of a hunting castle, surrounded by a vast park and hunting grounds, and a country villa with a beautiful view. In 1748, it served as a backdrop for a grandiose firework display arranged on the occasion of the wedding of Charles Eugene, Duke of Württemberg, and Princess Margravine Elisabeth Fredericka Sophie of Brandenburg-Bayreuth.

From 1806, King Frederick I of Württemberg converted the park into a ménagerie, containing wild boar, deer and chamois, and the house was used as a hunting lodge. At much the same time, the architect Nikolaus Friedrich von Thouret renovated the building's interior in the neoclassical style.

With the fall of the monarchy in the 20th century, the house was little used, neglected and fell into disrepair. It was restored from 1980 onward, and it opened to the public in 1983. The park has been transformed into a landscape garden, which has since served as an animal park. Today, the originally furnished castle rooms give an insight into courtly life.

== Modern use ==
Schloss Favorite is state-owned, under the control of the State Castles and Parks of Baden-Württemberg. It is open to the public, included with a guided tour of the main palace.

Starting in 1987, Schloss Favorite has been used for the filming of the weekly evening talk show "Nachtcafé" produced by the television and radio company SWR. In 2003, a two-part film “Pride and Passion” (German: Das unbezähmbare Herz) was shot here, in which Bettina Zimmermann, Stefan Jürgens and Sonja Kirchberger played the main roles.

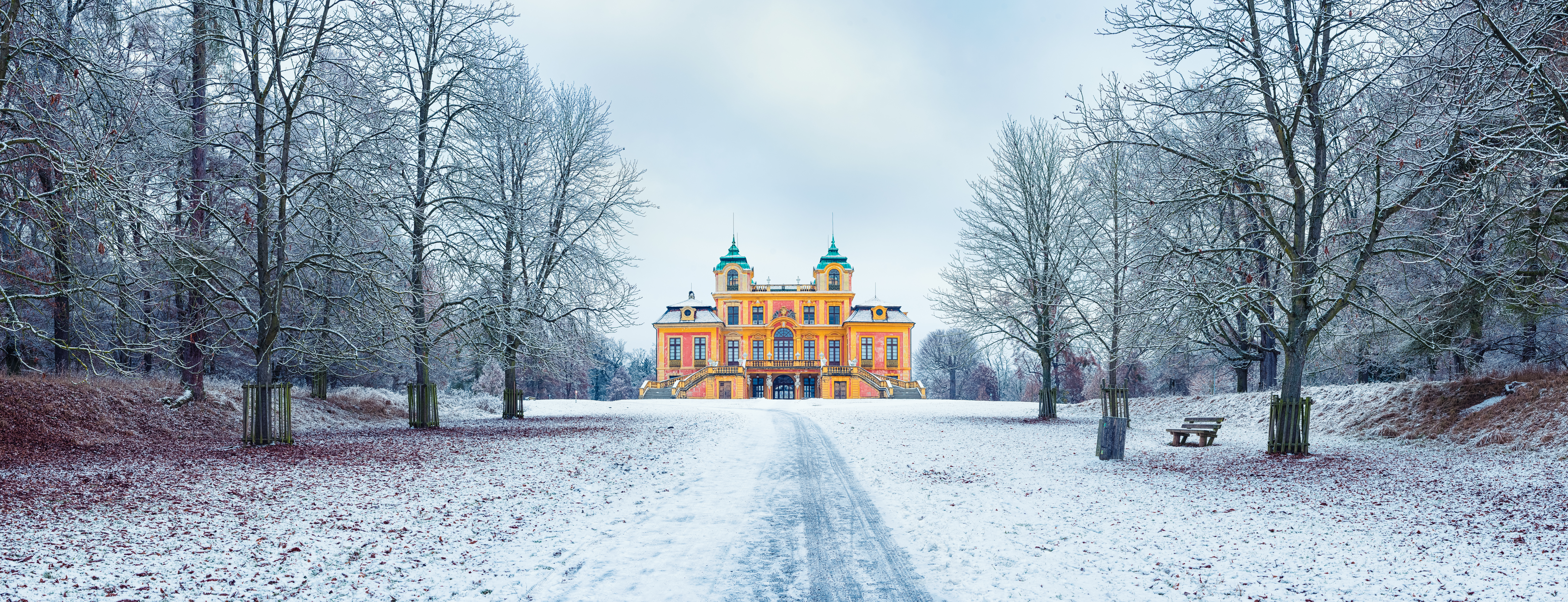
Panorama of Schloss Favorite from the path to Ludwigsburg Palace, January 2017

== See also ==
- List of Baroque residences
- Monrepos Palace
