= Gerold von Gleich =

German army officer

- Born: March 17, 1869; Ludwigsburg, Kingdom of Württemberg, German Empire
- Died: April 7, 1938 (aged 69); Ludwigsburg, Germany
- Military career
- Allegiance: German Empire; Ottoman Empire
- Rank: Generalmajor; Mirliva (Pasha)
- Units: Dragoner-Regiment Königin Olga Nr. 25; Ottoman Sixth Army; Infanterie-Regiment Kaiser Wilhelm Nr. 120; Infanterie-Brigade Nr. 18
- Conflicts: World War I; First Balkan War; Siege of Kut; Battle of Arras (1917); Battle of Cambrai (1917); German spring offensive

Gerold von Gleich (1869–1938) was a German army officer, who served in both the German Imperial Army and the Ottoman Army during World War I, and wrote a memoir of his military career. After the war, he became a distinguished scientist in the field of theoretical physics and contributed significantly to contemporary debates on relativity.

Gerold von Gleich was born on 17 March 1869 in Ludwigsburg, in the Kingdom of Württemberg, in the German Empire. His father, Alarich von Gleich, was an army officer, who later attained the rank of Generalleutnant. He attended the Gymnasium in Ulm (1876–83).

== Military career ==
Gleich began his military career in 1886 in the Dragoner-Regiment Königin Olga Nr. 25 in Ludwigsburg. In 1890, he was transferred to the General Staff. In 1902-05 he served as a squadron commander in the 13. Dragoner-Regiment in Metz. Thereafter he was again seconded to the General Staff, where his exceptional linguistic abilities marked him out for overseas service. In 1912, he was assigned as German Military Attaché to the High Command of the Greek Army, where he observed victorious Greek military operations against Ottoman forces on several fronts during the First Balkan War. In 1913, following his return to Germany, he was appointed commanding officer of the Dragoner-Regiment Königin Olga Nr. 25, and took the field with this unit as Oberstleutnant at the outbreak of World War I. In 1915 he was promoted to Oberst.

In February 1916, he was selected for secondment to the now allied Ottoman Army and assigned to Baghdad, as chief of staff to Feldmarschall von der Goltz. There he became chief of staff of the Ottoman Sixth Army, with the Ottoman rank of Mirliva and the accompanying title of Pasha. He participated in the successful siege of Kut-al-Mara and subsequent events in Mesopotamia up to late summer 1916. Infected by unclean drinking water, he suffered severe illness and was transported to Aleppo to recuperate. Gleich subsequently wrote a detailed memoir of his military experiences during 1912–16, which was published in 1921 as Vom Balkan nach Bagdad: militärisch-politische Erinnerungen an dem Orient (From the Balkans to Baghdad: military-political recollections of the East).

In January 1917 he commanded the Infanterie-Regiment Kaiser Wilhelm Nr. 120 on the Western Front, fighting on the Somme. As commander of Infanterie-Brigade Nr. 18, he played a part in the fighting at Arras and Cambrai, and during the German spring offensive. In 1918 he was promoted to Generalmajor and, on his request, retired from active duty in 1919.

== Contributions to science ==
After the war, Gleich pursued a second career as a gifted and multitalented scientist. From an early age, as an officer cadet, he had demonstrated interest and aptitude in mathematical and astronomical studies. In the post-war era he wrote around 40 scientific papers on physics and astronomy, contributing significantly to debates on relativity. In 1930, he published a comprehensive overview of his work in the book Einsteins Relitivitätstheorien und physikalische Wirklichkeit (Einstein's Theory of Relativity and Physical Reality).

Gleich died on 7 April 1938 in Ludwigsburg, following a long and painful illness.

== Selected writings ==
- Die alte Armee und ihre Verirrungen; Eine kritische Studie (Koehler: Leipzig 1919)
- Vom Balkan nach Bagdad: militärisch-politische Erinnerungen an dem Orient (Scherl Verlag: Berlin 1921)
- Betrachtungen über die Kriegführung in Mespotamien, in Jahrbuch des Bundes der Asienkämpfer (1923), 81–105
- Die allgemeine Relativitätstheorie und das Merkur Perihel, in Annalen der Physik (1923). 72, 221–235
- Einsteins Relitivitätstheorien und physikalische Wirklichkeit (Barth Verlag: Leipzig 1930)
