= Ludwigsburg =

- Town
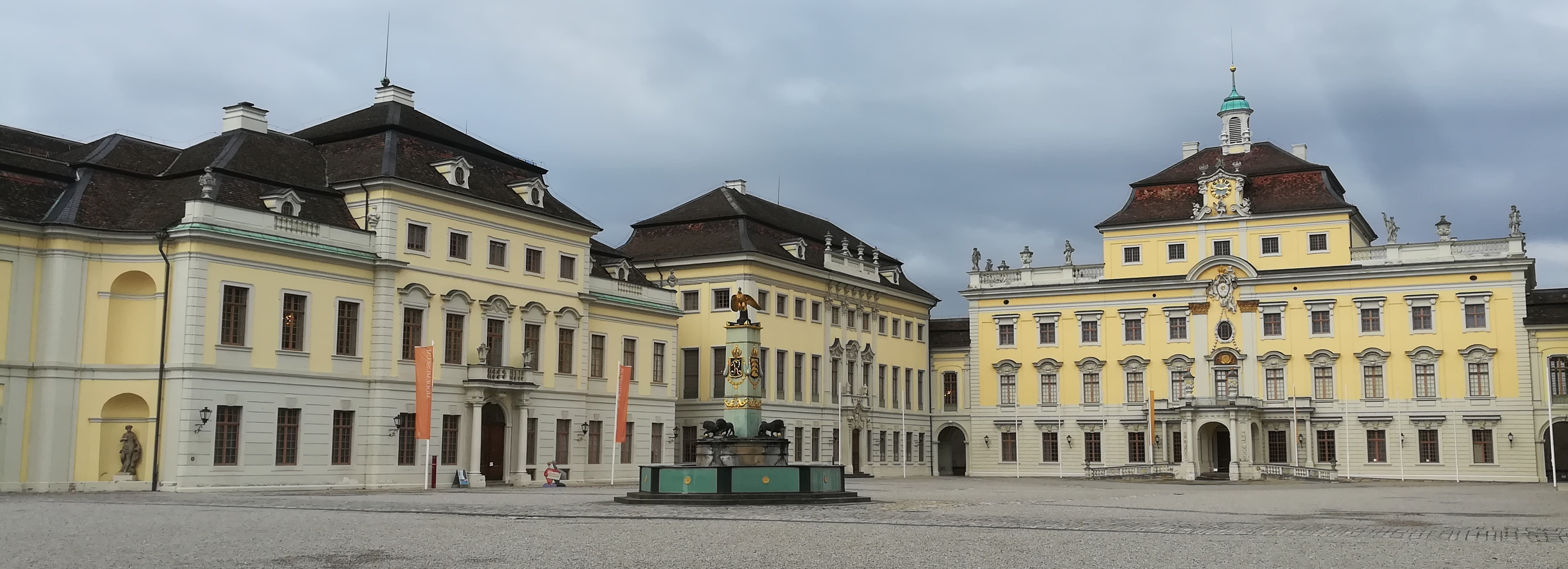
- Ludwigsburg Palace, inner courtyard

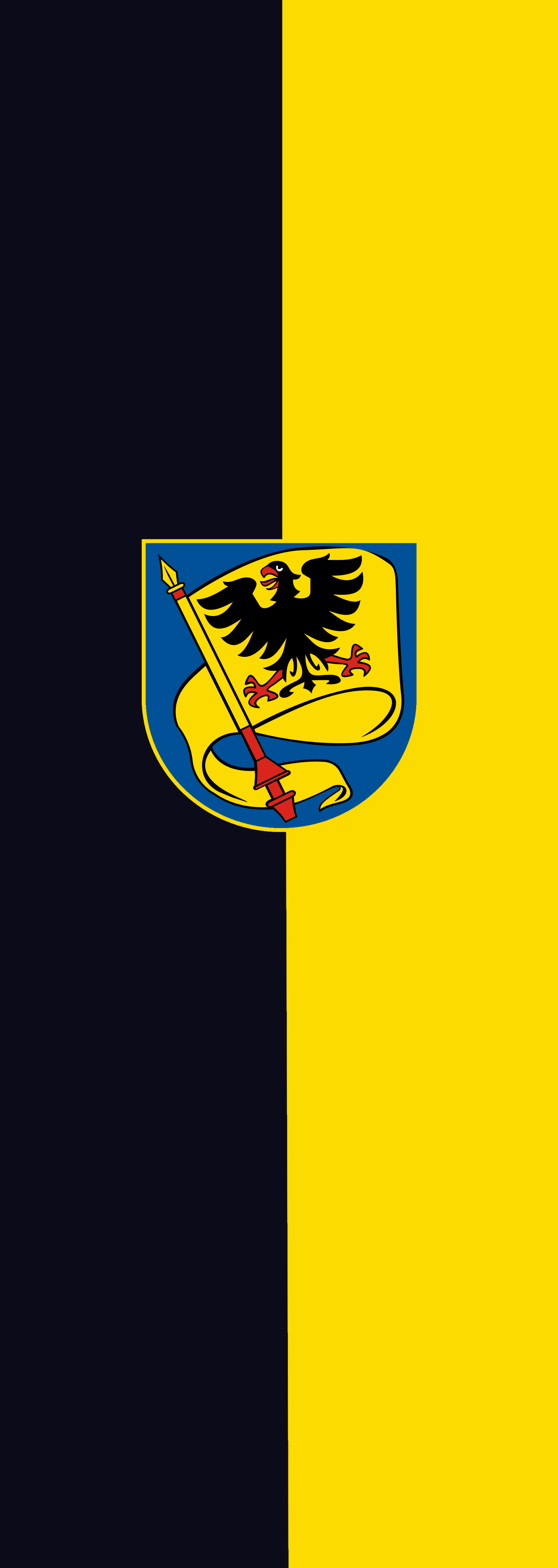
- Flag Coat of arms

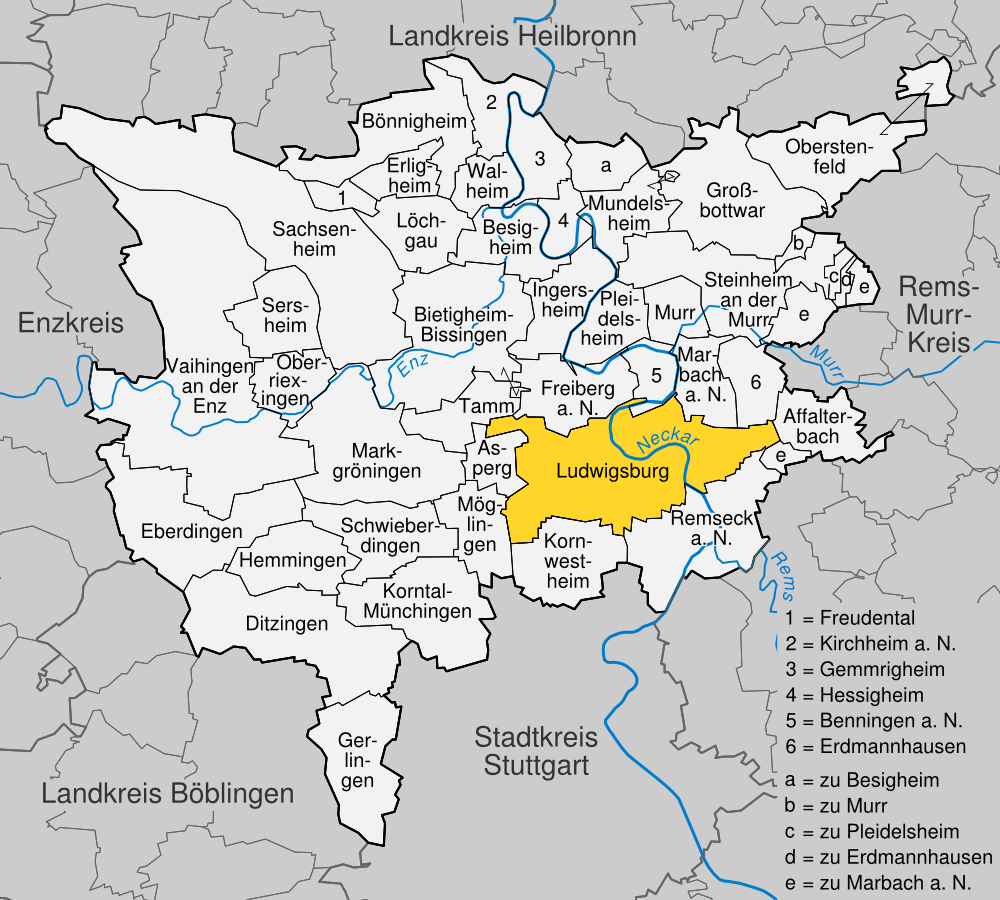
- Location of Ludwigsburg within Ludwigsburg district
- Interactive map of Ludwigsburg
- Location within Germany Location within Baden-Württemberg
- Coordinates: 48°53′51″N 9°11′32″E
- Country: Germany
- State: Baden-Württemberg
- Admin. region: Stuttgart
- District: Ludwigsburg

Government
  - Mayor (2019–27): Matthias Knecht (Ind.)

Area
  - Total: 43.34 km^{2} (16.73 sq mi)
- Elevation: 293 m (961 ft)

Population (2025-12-31)
  - Total: 93,002
  - Density: 2,146/km^{2} (5,558/sq mi)
- Time zone: UTC+01:00 (CET)
  - Summer (DST): UTC+02:00 (CEST)
- Postal codes: 71634–71642
- Dialling codes: 07141
- Vehicle registration: LB
- Website: www.ludwigsburg.de

Ludwigsburg (German pronunciation: [ˈluːtvɪçsˌbʊʁk]) is a city in Baden-Württemberg, Germany, about 12 kilometres (7.5 mi) north of Stuttgart city centre, near the river Neckar. It is the largest and primary city of the Ludwigsburg district with about 94,000 inhabitants. It is situated within the Stuttgart Region, and the district is part of the administrative region (Regierungsbezirk) of Stuttgart.

== History ==
The middle of Neckarland, where Ludwigsburg lies, was settled in the Stone and Bronze Ages. Numerous archaeological sites from the Hallstatt period remain in the city and surrounding area.

Towards the end of the 1st century, the area was occupied by the Romans. They pushed the Limes further to the east around 150 and controlled the region until 260, when the Alamanni occupied the Neckarland. Evidence of the Alamanni settlement can be found in grave sites in the city today.

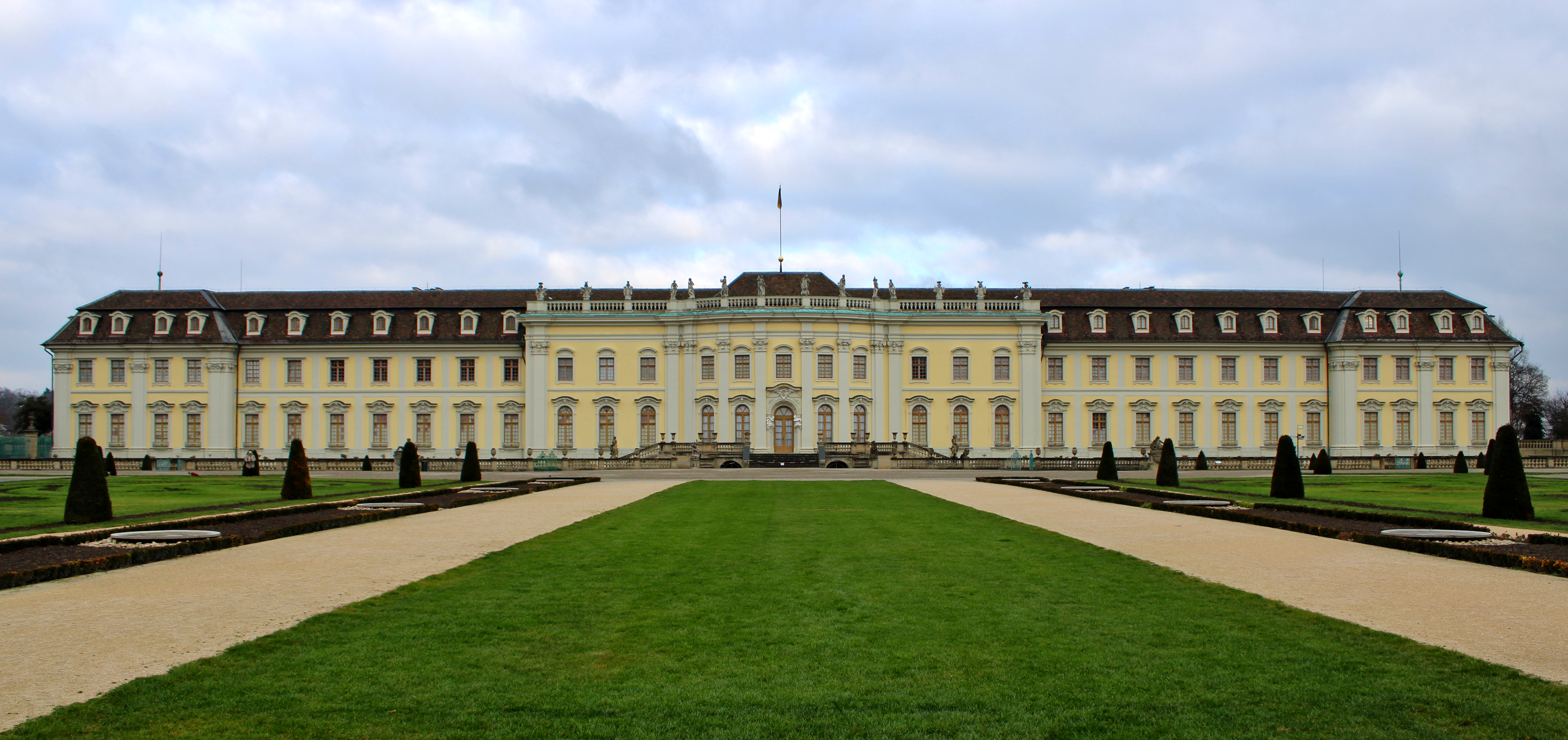
View of the upper grounds of Ludwigsburg Palace

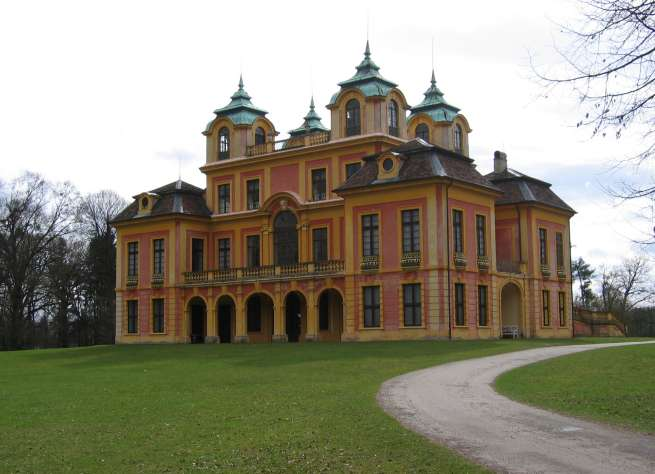
Favorite hunting lodge

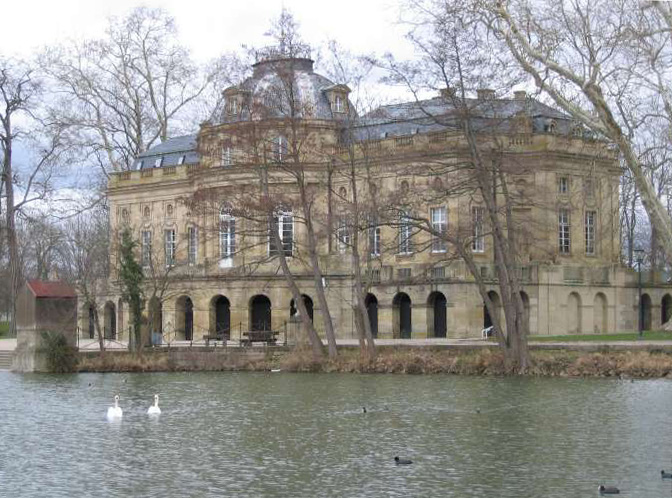
Monrepos Palace

The origins of Ludwigsburg date from the beginning of the 18th century (1718–1723) when the largest baroque castle in Germany, Ludwigsburg Palace was built by Duke Eberhard Ludwig von Württemberg. Originally, the Duke planned to just build one country home (albeit a palace), which he began building in 1704. However, the examples of other princes fostered a desire to project his absolutist power by establishing a city. To the baroque palace, he added a hunting lodge and country seat, called Schloss Favorite (1713–1728), and the Seeschloss (castle on the lake) Monrepos (1764–1768).

A settlement began near the palace in 1709 and a town charter was granted on 3 April 1718. That same year, Ludwigsburg became a bailiff's seat, which eventually became the rural district of Ludwigsburg in 1938.

In the years between 1730 and 1800, the royal seat of residence changed back and forth several times between Stuttgart and Ludwigsburg. In 1800, Württemberg was occupied by France under Napoleon Bonaparte and was forced into an alliance. In 1806, the Kurfürst (Prince-Elector) Friedrich was made king of Württemberg by Napoleon. In 1812, the Württembergish army was raised in Ludwigsburg for Napoleon's Russian campaign. Of the 15,800 Württemberg soldiers who served, just a few hundred returned.

In 1921, Ludwigsburg became the largest garrison in southwest Germany. In 1945, Ludwigsburg was made a "Kreisstadt" (urban district), and later, when the Baden-Württemberg municipal code took effect on 1 April 1956, the city was named a major urban district. In 1956 the tradition of the German garrison town was taken up again by the Bundeswehr, Germany's federal armed forces.

2004 was the 300th birthday of Residenzschloss Ludwigsburg, celebrated by the opening of the Baroque Gallery and the Ceramic Museum in the Residenzschloss.

=== Founding ===
The area around Ludwigsburg had been a favored hunting grounds by the royal Württemberg family for generations before the founding of Ludwigsburg. Although the region was wilderness, it was easily accessible by boat using the Neckar River. In 1704 the founder of Ludwigsburg, Eberhard Ludwig, Duke of Württemberg, arranged for the laying of the foundation stone for Ludwigsburg Palace. Ludwigsburg is named after the Duke Eberhard Ludwig' middle name. Right up until his death, construction workers and craftsmen worked on what was to become one of the largest Baroque palace ensembles in Europe. Under Eberhard Ludwig and his successor, Karl Eugene, the Palace served as the royal residence of Württemberg for a total of 28 years. With the Palace as their Gesamtkunstwerk (translated literally, "collective work of art") and the opulent festivals they organized, the Dukes put their unbounded power on display with no consideration for the finances of Württemberg. To them, their most important task was to bring fame and renown to the court of Württemberg and to compete with and outdo other European rulers in this regard.

Duke Eberhard Ludwig planned to found an ideal Baroque city right beside Ludwigsburg Palace. From 1709 onwards, he tried to attract new residents to the city with a series of incentives: first he promised free plots of land and free building materials as well as fifteen years tax-free status, and later on he added freedom to practice one's profession and religion to the list. However, the town only began to grow when it was granted city status in 1718 and then in that year became the royal residence and capital city of the country of Württemberg. By the time of Eberhard Ludwig' death in 1733, the population had risen to around 6,000 people, which was more than half as big as the former capital city Stuttgart. Nevertheless, the new capital city Ludwigsburg was still a major construction site with many unpaved streets and half-finished buildings.

For over two decades, Eberhard Ludwig (1676–1733) held court in Ludwigsburg with his mistress Wilhilmine von Grävenitz (1684–1744) while the Duchess Johanna Elisabeth (1680–1757) remained in Stuttgart. The clever, ambitious mistress made the best of her time, influencing politics in Württemberg and advancing her status in society. When it became clear that the seriously ill heir to the throne would not come to power, Eberhard Ludwig had a change of heart, split with his lover and reconciled with his wife in the hope that he would have another son. This was cause for great joy for many people in Württemberg, as the Protestant population feared that power would fall into the hands of the Catholic side of the royal house. To mark reconciliation, the Ludwigsburg citizenry published a leaflet with a copper etching that made reference to the general wish for a new heir to the throne. The etching depicts the personification of Ludwigsburg who is receiving a pearl, a symbol of fertility, from the hand of God. However, people's hopes for another child were not fulfilled as Eberhard Ludwig died in 1733 and his Catholic cousin, Karl Alexander, Duke of Württemberg, ascended to the throne. When Karl Alexander immediately moved the capital of Württemberg back to Stuttgart, the population of the Ludwigsburg suddenly dropped by more than half within a year.

=== Jews and World War II ===
Jewish families began living in Ludwigsburg during the 19th century and in 1884, a synagogue was built on Solitudestraße. The synagogue was later destroyed by storm troopers during Kristallnacht, the pogrom of November 1938. In 1988, the perimeter of the structure was marked out in plaster on the site. A 1959 memorial and newer memorial plaques commemorate the Jewish Holocaust victims and extol human rights.

In 1940, a Nazi propaganda film, Jud Süß, was filmed in Ludwigsburg. The film was based on a historical figure, Joseph Süß Oppenheimer, who was executed in Stuttgart in 1738; Oppenheimer lived in Ludwigsburg.

During World War II, the city suffered moderate damage compared to other German cities. There were 1500 deaths. It was the home of the prisoner-of-war camp Stalag V-A from October 1939 till April 1945. After the war, there was a large displaced persons camp which housed several thousand mainly Polish displaced persons until about 1948. After 1945 until the middle of 1946, there was also an allied internment camp for war criminals in Ludwigsburg and the U.S. Army maintained the Pattonville barracks on the edge of town, large enough to have its own American high school. The land was returned to Germany in 1994.

On 27 September 2008, the first 12 Stolpersteine were laid in Ludwigsburg. They are part of a project by artist Gunter Demnig to memorialize individuals who perished under Nazi persecution. Demnig was back in Ludwigsburg on 7 October 2009 to install more Stolpersteine.

== Coat of arms ==
Ludwisburg's coat of arms

The coat of arms of Ludwigsburg depicts a black eagle on a golden banner flying on an oblique red lance, on a blue background. Duke Eberhard Louis, Duke of Württemberg awarded Ludwigsburg its coat of arms on 3 September 1718 as a Reichssturmfahne, which had been part of the Duchy of Württemberg's own coat of arms since 1495. There were some minor changes made to the design, as it had already been associated with the town of Markgröningen. A missive from the office of the mayor of Ludwigsburg in 1759–60 mentions its flag.

== Public institutions ==
- Ludwigsburg has a court of first instance (magistrate's/municipal court) (Amtsgericht in German), external benches of the Stuttgart Employment Tribunal, a tax- and revenue office, and an Employment Agency (German: Agentur für Arbeit).
- The Central Office of the State Justice Administrations for the Investigation of National Socialist Crimes(German: Zentrale Stelle der Landesjustizverwaltungen zur Aufklärung nationalsozialistischer Verbrechen or German: Zentrale Stelle or German: Z Commission), Germany's main agency responsible for investigating war crimes during Nazi rule, has its seat at Ludwigsburg.
- Further there is the district administration office (German: Landratsamt) of Ludwigsburg district.
- There is a teaching hospital with 969 beds of the University Hospital Heidelberg.
- The town is also the seat of a church district office of the Evangelical-Lutheran Church in Württemberg (German: Evangelische Landeskirche in Württemberg) and a deanery of the Roman Catholic Diocese of Rottenburg-Stuttgart.
- Since its foundation in 1948 the Franco-German Institute (German: Deutsch-Französisches Institut (DFI)) has its seat at Ludwigsburg.
- Staatsarchiv Ludwigsburg

=== City government ===
The town council has 40 members. The last local election was on 25 May 2014. The voter participation was 44.62%. The results of the election were:

Party	Seats	%
CDU	11	26.72%
The Greens	8	19.87%
SPD	8	18.52%
Free Voters	7	17.64%
FDP	2	5.98%
The Left	2	5.20%
LUBU	1	3.37%
REP	1	1.78%

== Business and industry ==
The North-South Powerline, includes a large transformer station Ludwigsburg-Hoheneck, built in 1926, which still exists today. It is a central junction in the power lines of Baden-Württemberg to this day.

On 5 October 1957, the first 380kV-powerline in Germany between the transformer station Ludwigsburg-Hoheneck and Rommerskirchen went into service.

=== Local businesses ===
- GdF Wüstenrot, building and loan association
- Beru AG, automotive supplier
- Getrag GmbH, automotive supplier (founded in Ludwigsburg, now in Untergruppenbach)
- Mann+Hummel, manufacturer of automotive filtration products
- Kreissparkasse Ludwigsburg, bank
- Volksbank Ludwigsburg, bank
- Stihl
- Bosch
- Porsche
- Mieschke Hofman und Partner
- Mercedes-AMG
- Gleason-Pfauter Maschinenfabrik GmbH

== Education ==
In 1966, the Ludwigsburg University of Education (Pädagogische Hochschule) a teacher training college, and the Staatliche Sportschule Ludwigsburg (State Sports School) were opened.

Further universities based in Ludwigsburg are the Ludwigsburg University of Applied Sciences (Hochschule für öffentliche Verwaltung und Finanzen Ludwigsburg), a public institution for the training of higher-level Civil Servants), and the Ludwigsburg Evangelical University for Social Works, Church Social Works and Religious Teaching (Evangelische Hochschule Ludwigsburg (Hochschule für Soziale Arbeit, Religionspädagogik und Diakonie)).

In 1991, a national film school, Film Academy Baden-Württemberg (Filmakademie Baden-Württemberg) was established in Ludwigsburg, which has won several national and international awards and is regarded as one of the best film schools in the world.

Since 2007, there is also the Academy of Performing Arts Baden-Wuerttemberg (Akademie für Darstellende Kunst Baden-Württemberg).

Ludwigsburg has eight secondary schools of various types and four vocational schools. There are also four special schools and seventeen primary schools. An adult high school and the city library are located at the cultural center behind the city hall.

== Transport ==
The city is served by Stuttgart Airport, which is located 40 km (25 mi) south from the city centre.

== Sports ==
Ludwigsburg has seven teams in the top level of professional sports. They are MHP Riesen Ludwigsburg (Basketball), both formations A and B of the dance team (1. Tanzclub Ludwigsburg), the Latin formation (TSC Ludwigsburg), the Hockey-Club Ludwigsburg 1912 e.V., Svl08 (water polo) and the Ludwigsburg riflery team. Additionally, there are numerous amateur clubs for various sports.

The handball club HB Ludwigsburg has won the Women's Bundesliga several times.

== Geography ==
=== Districts ===

Ludwigsburg consists of following districts:

- Mitte (Center)
- West
- Nord (North)
- Ost (East)
- Süd (South)
- Eglosheim
- Grünbühl-Sonnenberg
- Hoheneck, with a therapeutic and thermal bath, opened in 1907
- Neckarweihingen
- Oßweil
- Pflugfelden
- Poppenweiler

=== Neighbouring towns ===
The following towns are neighbouring towns of Ludwigsburg, starting north of the city and going clockwise: Freiberg am Neckar, Benningen am Neckar, Marbach am Neckar, Erdmannhausen, Affalterbach, Remseck am Neckar, Kornwestheim, Möglingen, Asperg und Tamm.

=== Climate ===
Ludwigsburg's climate is temperate oceanic (Köppen:Cfb) with warm and rainy summers and cold winters with less precipitation.

Climate data for Ludwigsburg (1991-2020)
Month	Jan	Feb	Mar	Apr	May	Jun	Jul	Aug	Sep	Oct	Nov	Dec	Year
Daily mean °C (°F)	1.9 (35.4)	2.7 (36.9)	6.4 (43.5)	10.5 (50.9)	14.6 (58.3)	18.1 (64.6)	19.9 (67.8)	19.5 (67.1)	15.0 (59.0)	10.6 (51.1)	5.7 (42.3)	2.7 (36.9)	10.6 (51.2)
Average precipitation mm (inches)	49.7 (1.96)	44.2 (1.74)	52.5 (2.07)	43.7 (1.72)	80.9 (3.19)	84.8 (3.34)	87.4 (3.44)	93.2 (3.67)	59.3 (2.33)	60.3 (2.37)	63.4 (2.50)	56.7 (2.23)	776.1 (30.56)
Mean monthly sunshine hours	64.7	88.2	139.3	184.8	210	226.5	241.1	227	168.2	113.2	67.9	55.2	1,786.1
Source: Deutscher Wetterdienst

== Population growth ==
Historical population

Year	Pop.	±%
1718	600	—
1726	2,442	+307.0%
1774	11,607	+375.3%
1803	5,248	−54.8%
1843¹	10,726	+104.4%
1871¹	11,785	+9.9%
1875¹	13,800	+17.1%
1880¹	14,700	+6.5%
1885¹	16,187	+10.1%
1890¹	17,418	+7.6%

Year	Pop.	±%
1895¹	19,311	+10.9%
1900¹	19,436	+0.6%
1905¹	22,585	+16.2%
1910¹	24,926	+10.4%
1916¹	19,377	−22.3%
1917¹	19,206	−0.9%
1919¹	23,303	+21.3%
1925¹	28,861	+23.9%
1933¹	34,135	+18.3%
1939¹	43,505	+27.4%

Year	Pop.	±%
1945	38,804	−10.8%
1946¹	49,635	+27.9%
1950¹	58,489	+17.8%
1956¹	69,535	+18.9%
1961¹	73,512	+5.7%
1965	76,555	+4.1%
1970¹	78,019	+1.9%
1975	83,622	+7.2%
1980	81,589	−2.4%
1985	76,973	−5.7%

Year	Pop.	±%
1987¹	78,884	+2.5%
1990	82,343	+4.4%
1995	86,810	+5.4%
2000	86,897	+0.1%
2005	87,673	+0.9%
2006	87,295	−0.4%
2014	90,386	+3.5%

== People ==
Karl Eugen, Duke of Württemberg, enrolled the young Friedrich Schiller in the Karlsschule Stuttgart (an elite military academy he had founded) in 1773, where Schiller eventually studied medicine. The Duke was very demanding of his students, and Schiller's childhood was a lonely and unhappy one, but he was greatly enriched by the excellent education he received. It was there that he wrote his first play, Die Räuber ("The Robbers"), about a group of naïve revolutionaries and their tragic failure.

Leopold Mozart visited Württemberg with his son, Wolfgang Amadeus Mozart in July 1763 and said, "Ludwigsburg is a very special town."

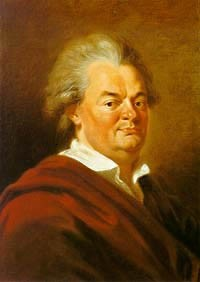
Christian Friedrich Daniel Schubart

- Antonio Čolak (born 1993), Croatian footballer
- Wilhelm Emil Fein (1842–1898), inventor
- Gerold von Gleich (1869–1938), army officer, military memoirist, physicist
- Wilhelm Groener (1867–1939), officer and politician
- Willi Hennig (1913–1976), biologist and founder of cladistics
- Caesar von Hofacker (1896–1944), Luftwaffe officer and Nazi resistance member, hanged for treason
- Eduard von Kallee (1818–1888), general, painter, and archaeologist
- Richard Kallee (1854–1933), pastor of Stuttgart-Feuerbach
- Justinus Kerner (1786–1862), writer and physician.
- Hartmut Michel (born 1948), co-recipient of 1988 Nobel Prize in Chemistry
- Eduard Mörike (1804–1875), romantic poet and theologian.
- Nikolaos Nakas (born 1982), German former footballer
- Charles Pfizer geb. Karl Pfizer (1824–1906), chemist and founder of Pfizer Inc.
- Karl Ludwig von Phull (1757–1826), general
- Christian Friedrich Daniel Schubart (1739–1791), poet.
- Tony Schumacher (1848–1931), author of children's books
- Hugo Sperrle (1885–1953), field marshal of the Luftwaffe during World War II
- David Friedrich Strauß (1808–1874), theologian and writer.
- Wilhelm Siegmund Teuffel (1820–1878), classical scholar.
- Albert Veiel (1806–1874), dermatologist
- Friedrich Theodor Vischer (1807–1887), theologian, professor, and politician.
- Reinhard von Werneck (1757–1842), soldier and director of Munich's Englischer Garten

=== Notable residents ===
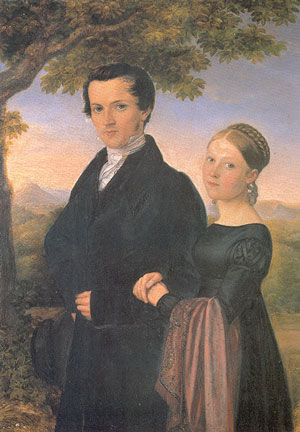
Friedrich Silcher and his wife 1822

- Eva Heller (1948–2008), author and social scientist, grew up there
- Ilse Koch (1906–1967), Nazi war criminal, lived there
- Horst Köhler (born 1943), former Federal President of Germany, grew up there
- Hans Scholl (1918–1943), student and resistance fighter, executed by the Nazis
- Sophie Scholl (1921–1943), student and resistance fighter, executed by the Nazis
- Friedrich Silcher (1789–1860), composer, wrote music there
- Carl Maria von Weber (1786–1826), composer, wrote music there.

== Twin towns – sister cities ==
Ludwigsburg is twinned with:

- Montbéliard, France (1950)
- Caerphilly, United Kingdom (1960)
- Yevpatoria, Ukraine (1990)
- St. Charles, United States (1995)
- Nový Jičín, Czech Republic (1991)
- Bergamo, Italy (2022)
