= Nikolaos Nakas =

German footballer

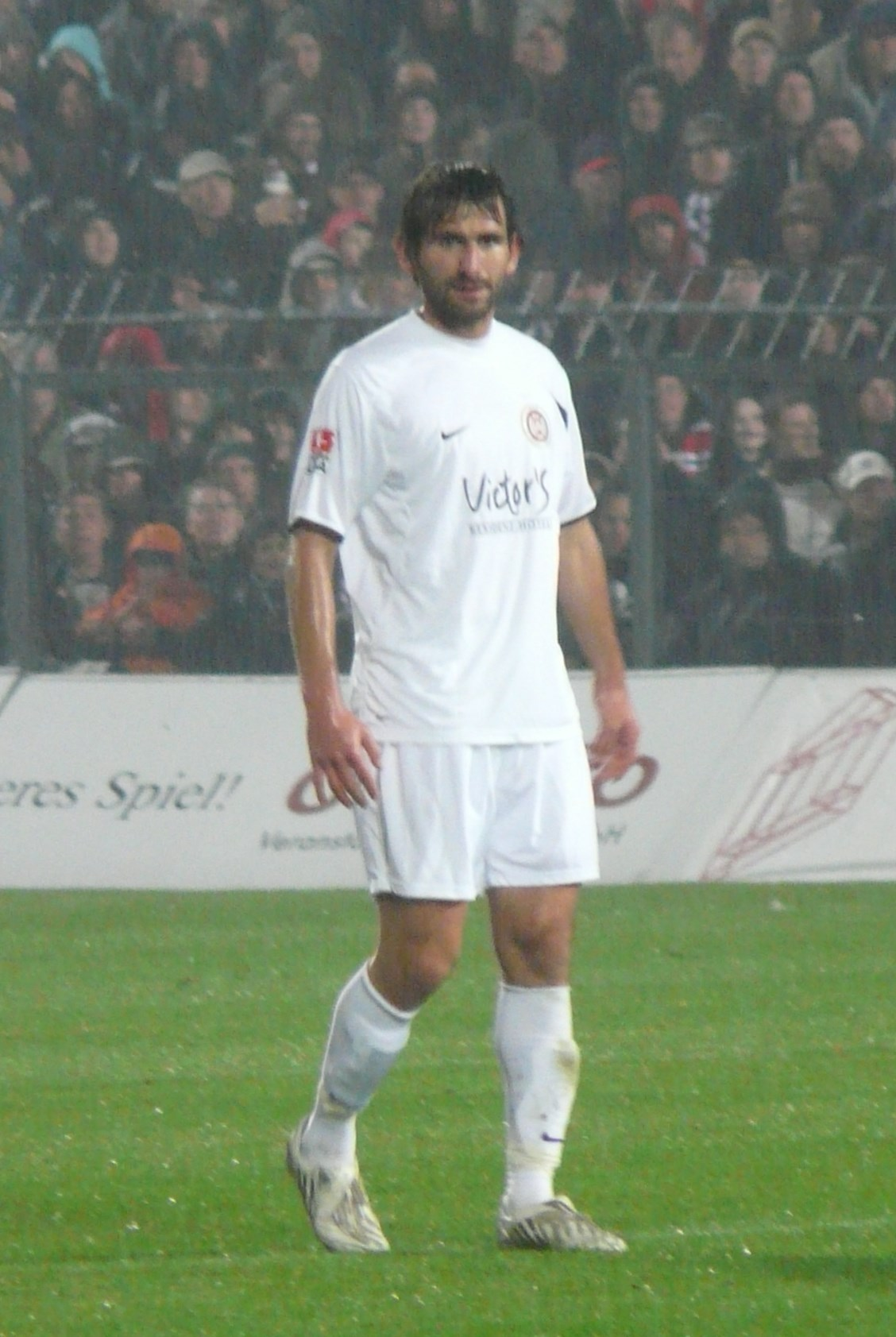
- Nakas in 2008

Personal information
- Date of birth: 13 April 1982 (age 44)
- Place of birth: Ludwigsburg, West Germany
- Height: 1.84 m (6 ft 0 in)
- Position: Defender

Youth career
- –1999: FV Kornwestheim

Senior career*
Years	Team	Apps	(Gls)
1999–2002	VfB Stuttgart II	1	(0)
2002–2003	TSV Crailsheim		
2003	SV Darmstadt 98	8	(0)
2003–2009	SV Wehen Wiesbaden	142	(4)
2009–2010	SV Elversberg	22	(0)
2011	SV Darmstadt 98	5	(0)
2011–2012	RSV Weyer	27	(2)
2012–2015	Hellas Schierstein	25	(3)
2015–2016	SG Schlangenbad	20	(2)

Managerial career
- 2012–2013: 1. FC Eschborn (assistant)
- 2019–: Mainz 05 (scout)
- * Club domestic league appearances and goals

Nikolaos Nakas (born 13 April 1982) is a German former football defender of Greek heritage.
