= Albert Veiel =

German dermatologist

Albert Friedrich Veiel (8 June 1806 – 2 August 1874) was a German dermatologist who was a native of Ludwigsburg.

He studied at the Universities of Tübingen and Paris, and in 1829 earned his medical doctorate. In 1837 at Cannstatt, he founded the first in-patient dermatological clinic in Germany. The clinic was called the Heilanstalt für Flechtenkranke, and with orthopedist Jakob Heine (1800–1879) and others, Veiel was a catalyst in making Cannstatt an important center for medical treatment. The clinic attracted numerous celebrities and members of European aristocracy.

== Selected publications ==
- Grundzüge der Behandlung der Flechten in der Heilanstalt in Cannstatt, (Fundamentals of treatment at the Flechtenkranke Sanitarium in Cannstatt), (1843); Stuttgart.
- Die Mineralquellen in Cannstatt, (Mineral springs in Cannstatt), (1852); Stuttgart.
- Mittheilungen über die Behandlung der chronischen Hautkrankheiten in der Heilanstalt für Flechtenkranke in Cannstatt, (On the treatment of chronic skin diseases in the Sanitarium for Flechtenkranke at Cannstatt), (1862); Stuttgart.
- Der Kurort Cannstatt und seine Mineralquellen (The Cannstatt spa and its mineral springs), (1867).
