= John Gleich =

German painter

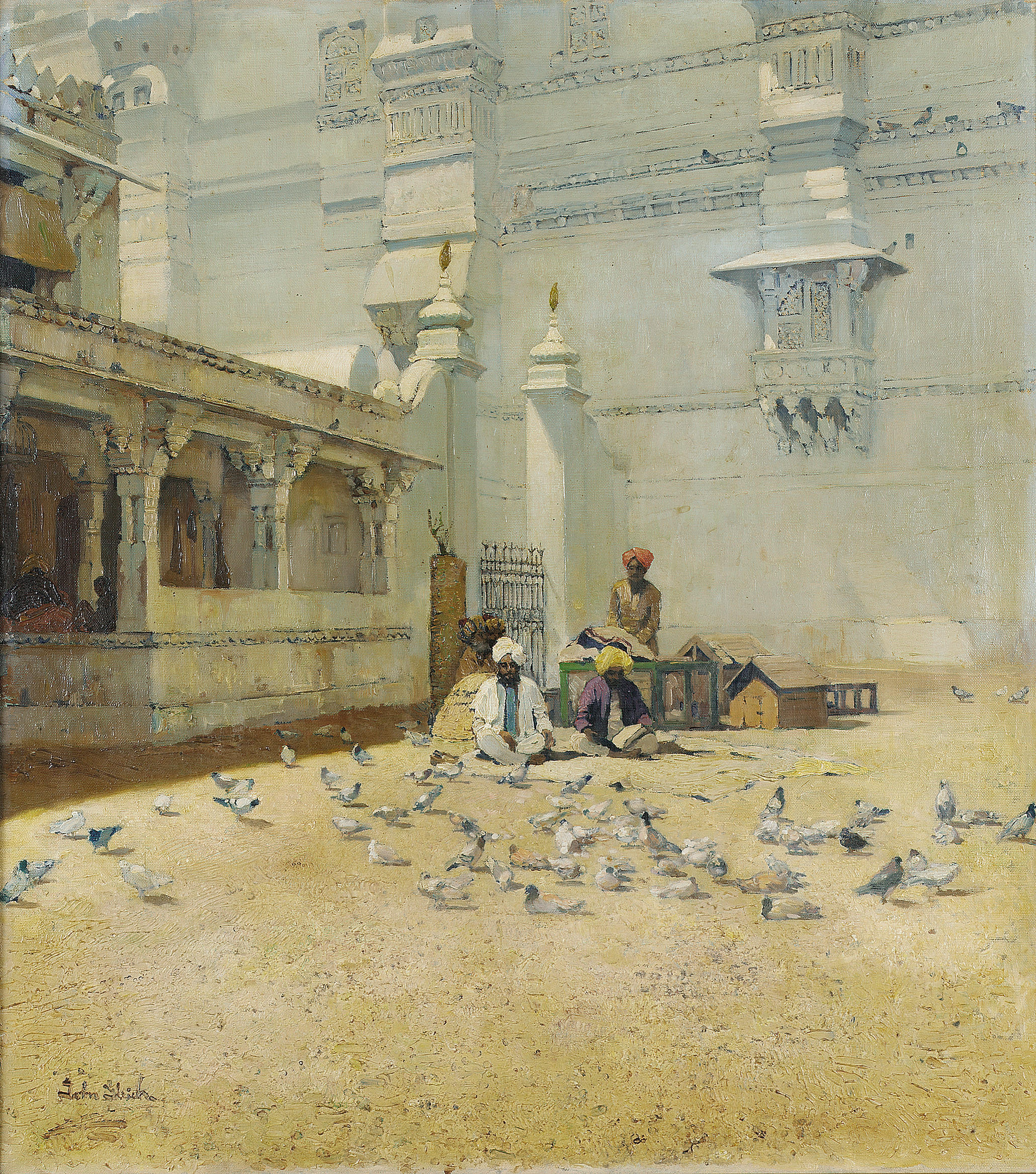
The Inner Courtyard of the Amber Fort, Jaipur

John Gleich (2 November 1879, Memel – c. 1927) was a Baltic-German merchant, painter and publicist; best known for Oriental and maritime scenes.

== Life and work ==
After completing his education, he worked as a merchant but, in his spare time, taught himself how to paint. After 1906, he devoted himself exclusively to painting. From 1909 to 1910, he took study trips to India and Ceylon, where he created Orientalist works. Back in Europe, he lived in Berlin; specializing in marine art, but also painting genre scenes, portraits and nudes, many in Oriental style.

During World War I, in 1915, he designed two coloring books for children, on the combat operations of the Imperial German Navy, both published by Maier, Ravensburg:

- Der Seekrieg. Ein Malbuch für die deutsche Jugend (The Sea War, Maier's Künstlermalbücher Nr. 683).
- Unsere Marine im Kampf. Ein Malbuch für die deutsche Jugend (Our Navy in Battle, Maier's Künstlermalbücher Nr. 682)

He also published several essays on Indian architecture in the Deutsche Bauzeitung, and in the various publications of the Deutsche Burgenvereinigung.

== Sources ==
- "Gleich, John". In: Ulrich Thieme, Fred. C. Willis (Eds.): Allgemeines Lexikon der Bildenden Künstler von der Antike bis zur Gegenwart, Vol.14: Giddens–Gress. E. A. Seemann, Leipzig 1921, pg.248 Online
- Christiane Kruse: "Gleich, John". In: Allgemeines Künstlerlexikon. Die Bildenden Künstler aller Zeiten und Völker (AKL). Vol.56, Saur, Munich 2007, ISBN 978-3-598-22796-7, pg.116
