= Joaquín Martínez de la Vega =

Spanish painter (1846–1905)

Joaquín Martínez de la Vega Cisneros
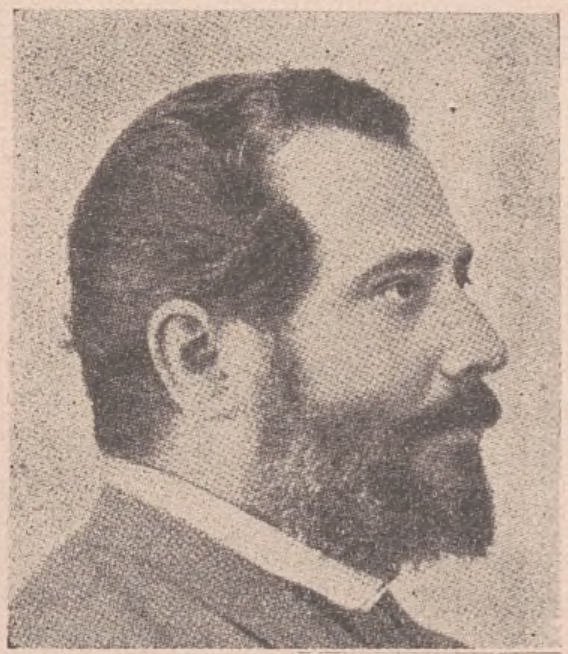
- de la Vega in a 1923 publication
- Born: 23 June 1846; Almería, Spain
- Died: 4 December 1905 (aged 59); Málaga, Spain
- Education: Real Academia de Bellas Artes de San Fernando
- Known for: Painting
- Movement: Costumbrism, orientalism, post-impressionism

Joaquín Martínez de la Vega Cisneros, usually cited as Joaquín Martínez de la Vega (Spanish: [xoa'kin mar'tineθ de la 'βega]; 23 June 1846 – 4 December 1905), was a Spanish painter and illustrator. Although he was born in Almería and studied at the Royal San Fernando Academy in Madrid, he is considered a member of the Málaga School of Painting.

A dandyish, dissolute and often transgressive individual, de la Vega clashed, both personally and artistically, with traditionalist Bernardo Ferrándiz, founder of the Málaga School; on the other hand, he sympathized with young Picasso and was a lifelong friend of José Denis. His work, especially in the late part of his career, is considered the closest to modernity within the aforementioned painting school, approaching cultural fin-de-siècle European tendencies like symbolism, post-impressionism and even, according to some authors, pre-raphaelism. Notable works include his pastel series on The Temptations of St. Anthony, his religious paintings (Ecce Homo and Dolorosa) and the posters he designed for the Feria de Agosto, especially the one he painted for the 1895 edition.

== Early life and education ==
de la Vega was born on 23 June 1846, in Almería, to Fernando Martínez de la Vega, a civil servant, and Carlota Cisneros Bonifaz, a housewife, both originally from Málaga. The family later relocated to Córdoba, where at age 15 Joaquín started art studies at the city Institute. He impressed his masters so much that just the following year he received a commission from the Provincial Government to illustrate an album to be presented to Queen Isabel II; as a reward, he received a 1000 pesetas per year scholarship to study art in Madrid.

de la Vega moved to Madrid in 1863, where he enrolled in the Royal San Fernando Academy, the leading art school in Spain at the time. There he studied for three years under Federico de Madrazo, acquiring from him an admiration for Velázquez, a pure style for drawing and a restrained palette. In those years he kept sending works to Córdoba (as established by the terms of his scholarship), most of them copies of Velazquez's paintings. In 1866 he was granted a 3000 pesetas scholarship by the Córdoba Provincial Government to study painting in Rome; however, according to most of his biographers, he never travelled there and the scholarship was cancelled, apparently due to the death of his father.

== Career and personal life ==
In 1869, de la Vega relocated to Málaga, where he rapidly befriended the painter José Denis and joined the local artistic circles; his recognition was boosted by the medal he obtained at the 1871 National Exhibition in Madrid, with the work A Beggar. In 1875 he started teaching drawing and color at the Málaga Lyceum, having among his pupils future painters such as Reyna Manescau and Xavier Cappa.

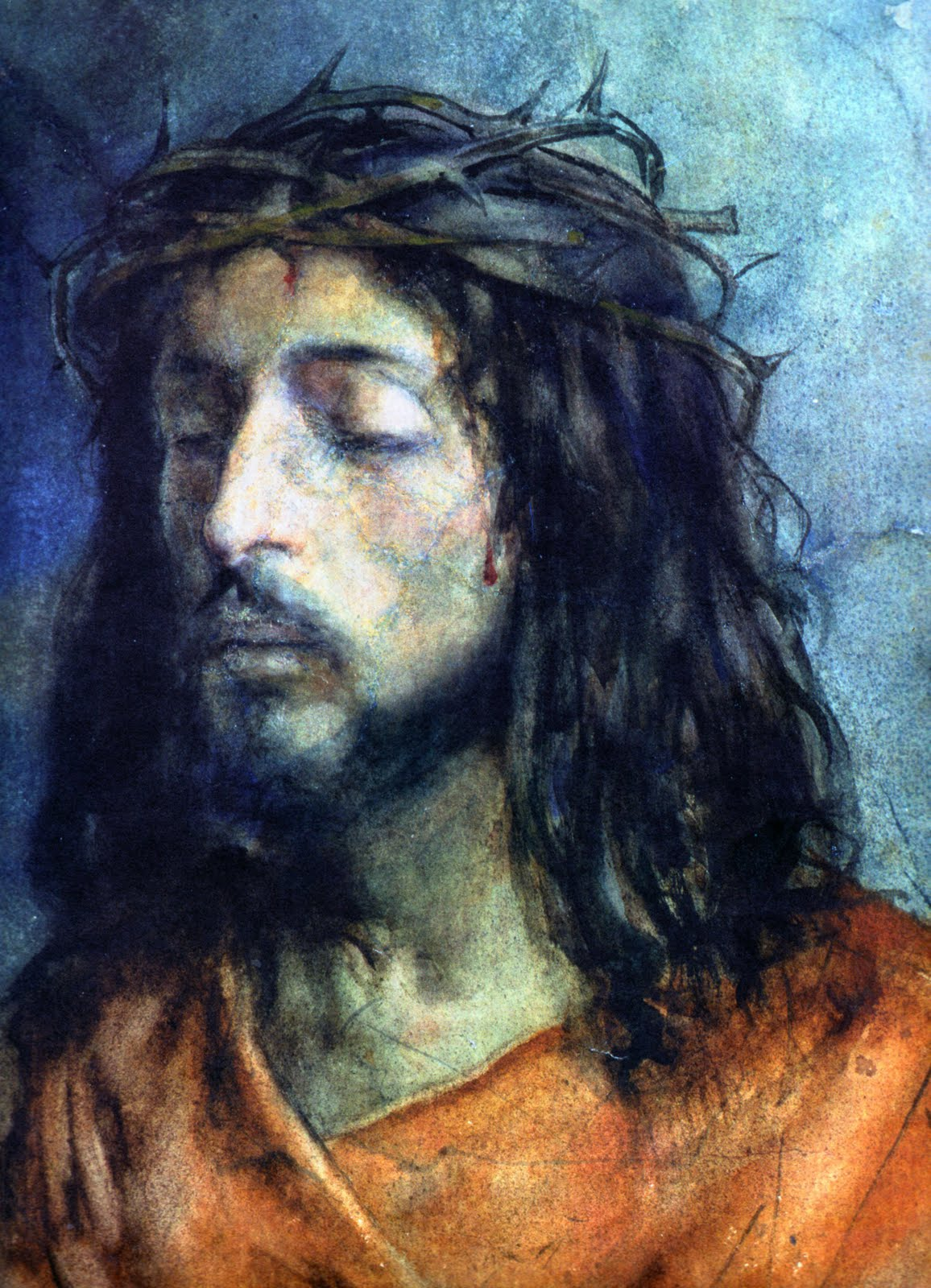
Ecce Homo (1893), Málaga Museum.

During the late 1870s and early 1880s, de la Vega rose to local fame and became a popular portrait painter and private drawing teacher for the provincial aristocracy, at a time when Málaga was a prosperous industrial center; however, unlike other painters like Moreno Carbonero, the dandyish and flamboyant Martínez de la Vega did not seek international or even national fame and he would not again send his works to any national exhibitions, which some biographers connect to a dissolute and disordered lifestyle and others to the bad reviews received by a painting he sent to the 1871 exhibition. In 1882, despite his public disagreements and conflicts with Bernardo Ferrándiz, he was appointed as an assistant teacher at the Málaga School of Fine Arts.

On 30 April 1885, de la Vega married María Dolores Casilari Bailón, with whom he had a daughter the following year; in this period he focussed on his career and produced, among other works, Vamos o No Vamos for the Málaga Lyceum. However, the infant died before her first birthday, which made the artist plunge into a severe depression aggravated by alcohol and cocaine abuse. The couple decided to move out of Málaga, but Joaquín's application for a teaching position in Seville was rejected in 1892. In early 1893, his wife María Dolores died too.

de la Vega would never recover from the loss of his family; however, the personal and financial collapse stirred him artistically to find new themes and styles. After the death of his wife he devoted to religious paintings, producing among others a series of Ecce Homo and paintings of the Virgin Mary (Dolorosas) that count as some of his master pieces. In 1894 and 1895 he was commissioned by the town council to create the posters for the Feria de Agosto festivals; the 1895 poster, titled Carmen, la más fea de mi tierra (Carmen, the Ugliest in my Hometown), is one of his most cited works. In 1897 he met Pablo Picasso, then sixteen, and immediately recognized his talent; Martínez de la Vega organized a tribute for the young artist at the Málaga Lyceum, where he and José Nogales mock-baptyzed Picasso with champagne as a newborn master.

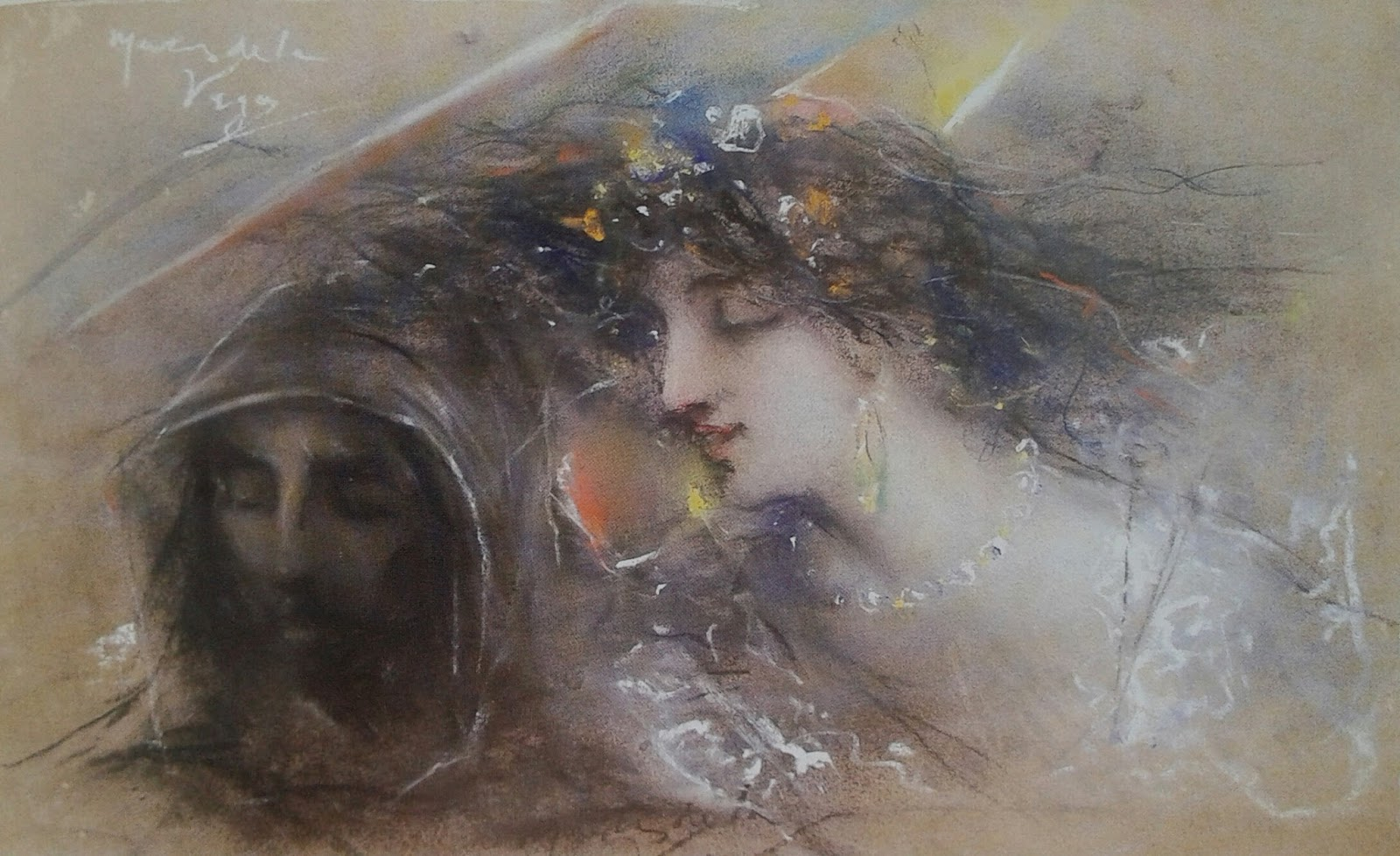
The Temptations of Saint Anthony (c. 1900), private collection.

de la Vega's addictions and scandals made him gradually infamous among the city's society, and he gradually lost his private lessons and most sources of income. On 19 September 1900 he married, against the will of her family, Pepita Cestino Utrera, the young heiress of a rich local family, only to have her running away back to her family's home on their wedding night; she died at the age of 78, without ever marrying again. With the meager salary as an assistant teacher at the School of Fine Arts as his almost only earnings, he lost his house and had to move to a small accommodation provided by José Denis. His late paintings became highly symbolic and sketchy; he was said to pay his bills at local taverns with doodles and sketches drawn on napkins or rough wrapping paper. Destitute and marginalized, Martínez de la Vega was found dead in his room on 4 December 1905, aged 59, in Málaga, from a hemorrhage.

== Style and technique ==
Within the Málaga School of Painting, de la Vega represented "vanguardism without rupture", and he was the most closely connected to the new European artistic tendencies of the time. Since he did not travel much, biographers speculate that he was influenced by the new movements through illustrated art magazines and contact with more internationally connected colleagues. Throughout his career he rejected landscape painting (which was popular at the time) and narrative conventionalism.

Sauret and Chaves distinguish three different artistic periods in his career:

From 1863 to 1877, under the academical influence of Federico de Madrazo, de la Vega developed a romantic style, with a carefully drawn trace and classical composition. He preferred romantic themes to historical ones, and his portraits were influenced by Madrazo and Velázquez.

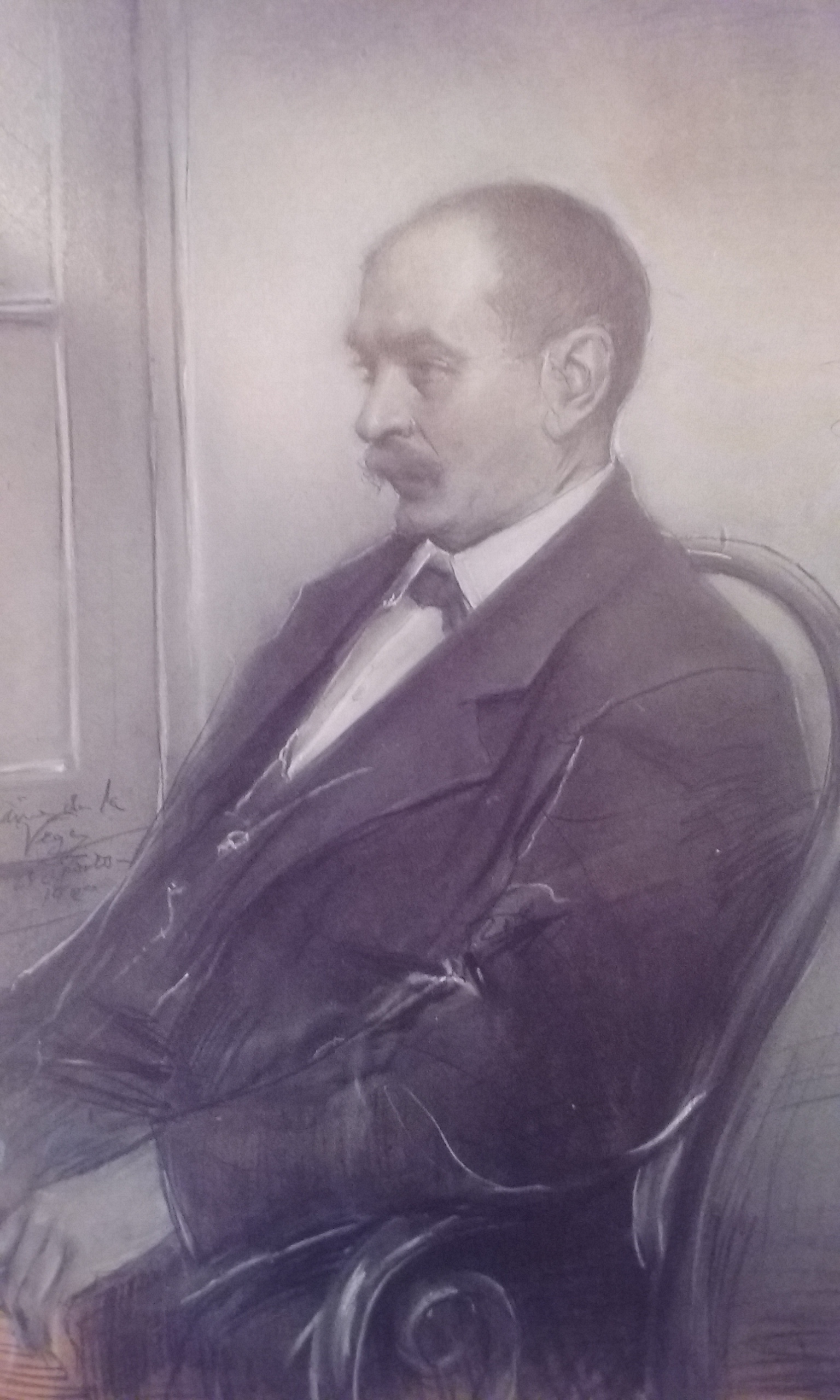
Portrait of D. Joaquín Inglada Torregrosa (1900), private collection.

From 1877 to 1888, de la Vega was influenced by other members of the Málaga School, particularly Denis and Ferrándiz. He produced orientalist paintings reminiscent or Fortuny, whom his colleagues in Málaga greatly admired, and also religious paintings. He continued creating abundant portraits, with similar techniques.

From 1888 to 1905, de la Vega suffered a profound personal crisis that heavily transformed his style and technique; this is the most interesting period of his production. He gradually introduced new techniques and themes; in the first part of this period, specially after his wife's death, he spiritualized the characters in his religious paintings and, according to some authors, approached pre-raphaelism. This religious paintings gradually evolved into symbolism and post-impressionism, adopting pastel as his main art medium and abandoning his carefully drawn lines to develop a sketchy technique that is reminiscent of contemporary post-impressionist painters like Toulouse-Lautrec and Ramón Casas. His themes in this final stage included religious introspection and erotism, as reflected in his series on The Temptations of St. Anthony. In his late portraits, like the Portrait of D. Joaquín Inglada Torregrosa, he abandoned classical composition and sets the models in daily and intimate environments.

== Gallery (in chronological order) ==
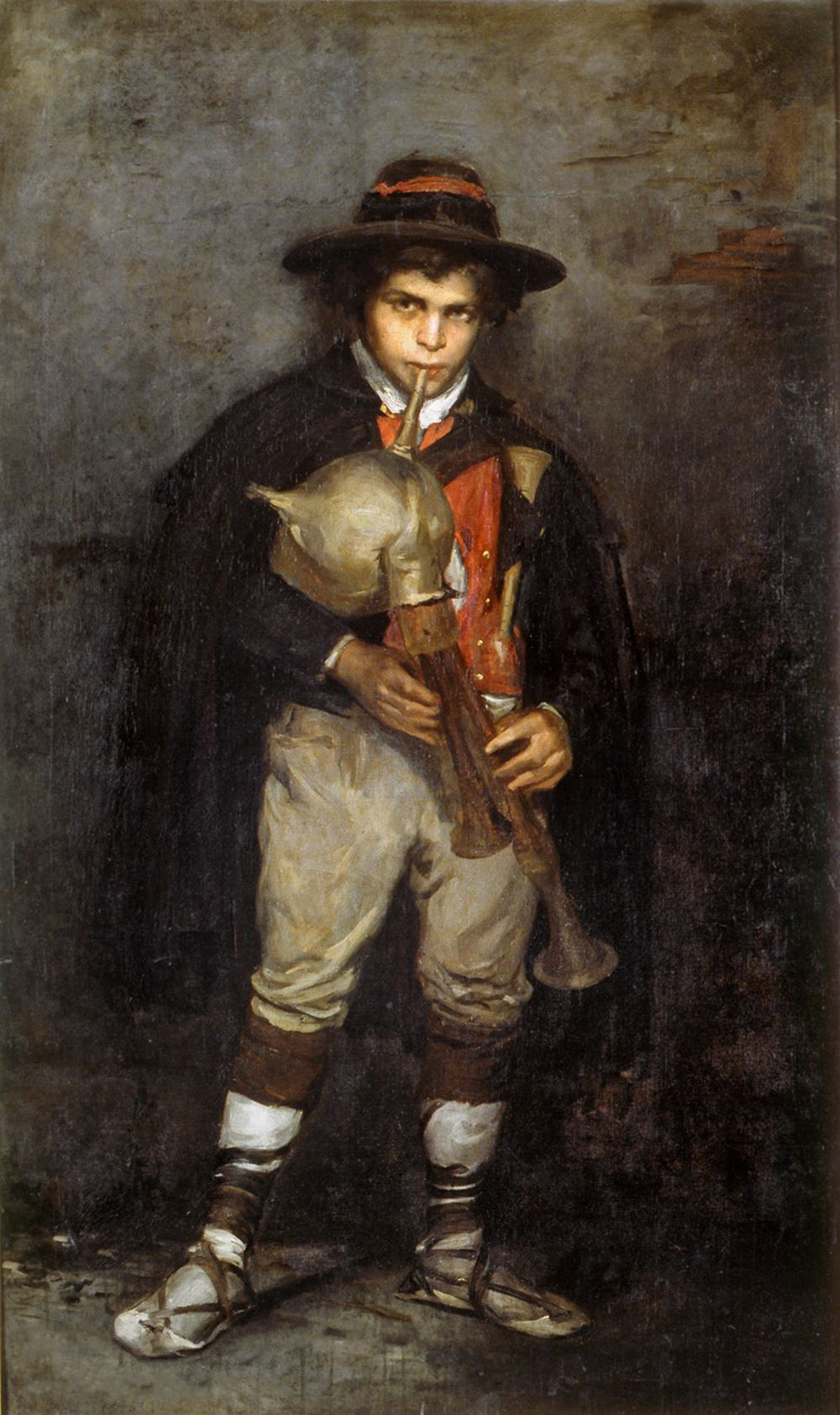
Neapolitan Piper (c. 1865), Córdoba Museum of Fine Arts.

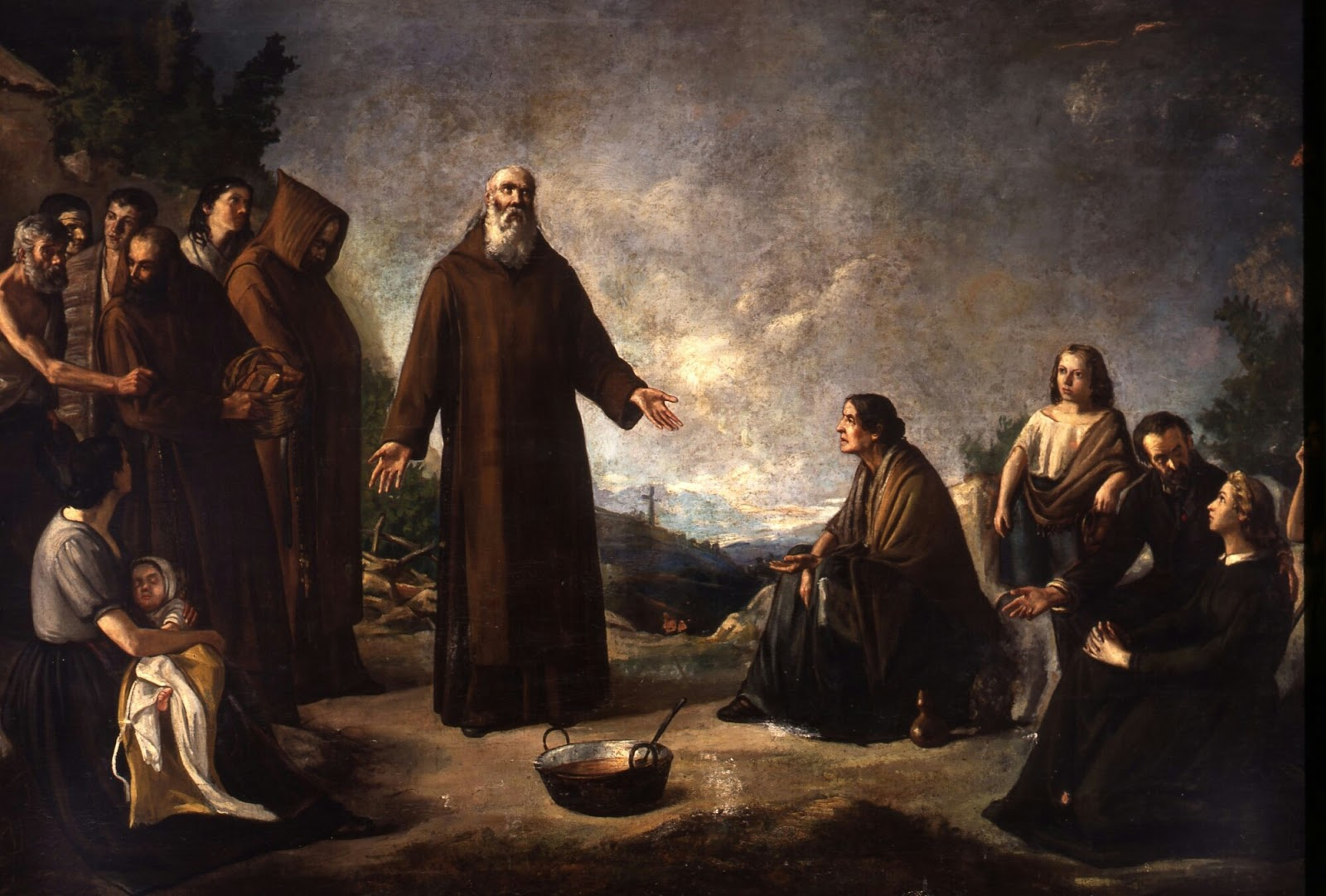
Hermits Feeding the Poor in Sierra Morena (1865), Córdoba Provincial Government.

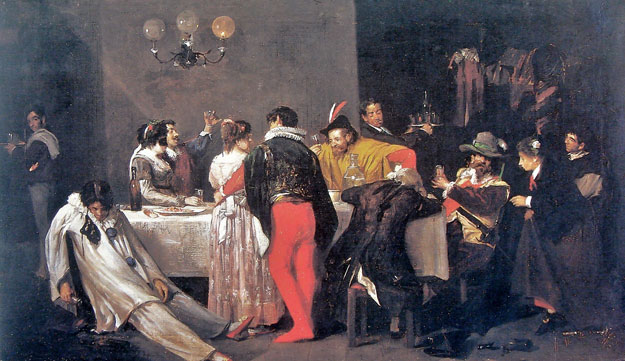
Costume Party (c. 1870), private collection.

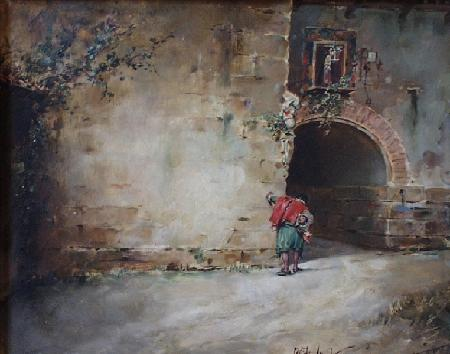
The Ambush (1871), Córdoba Museum of Fine Arts.

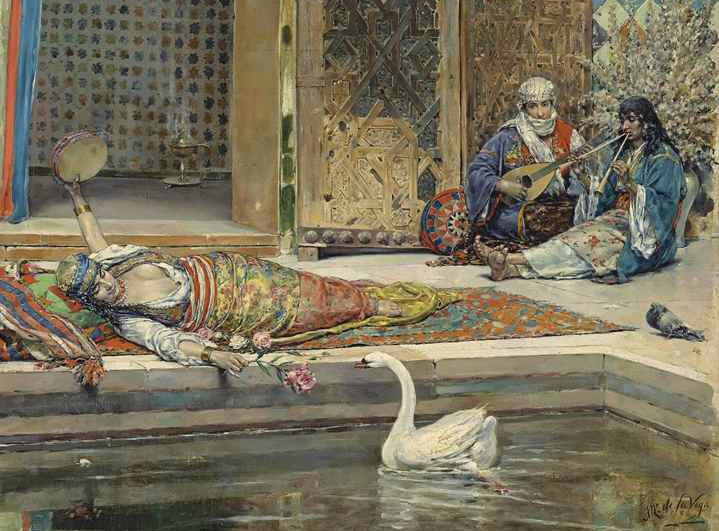
A Patio in La Alhambra (c. 1880), private collection.

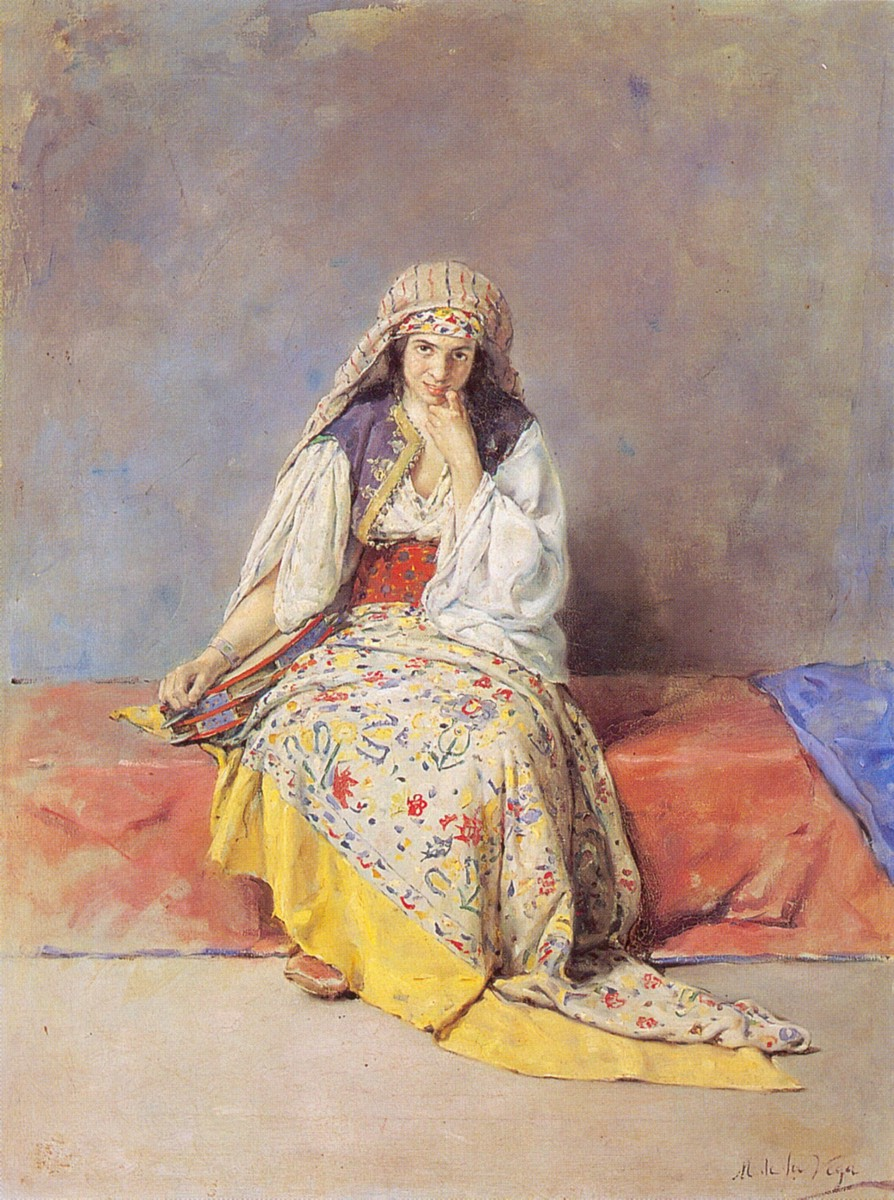
A Jewish Girl (c. 1880), private collection.

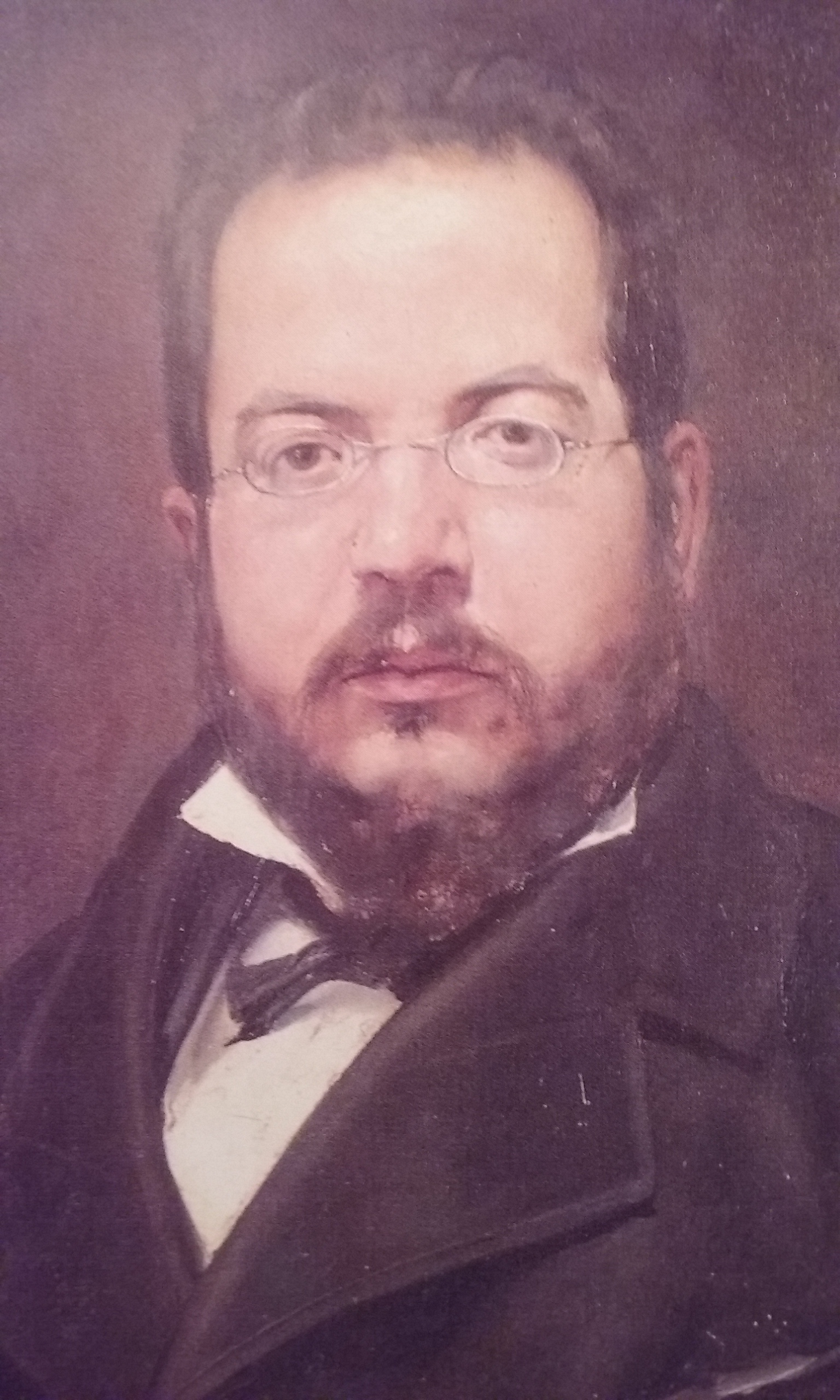
Portrait of Guillén Robles (1880), Málaga Town Hall.

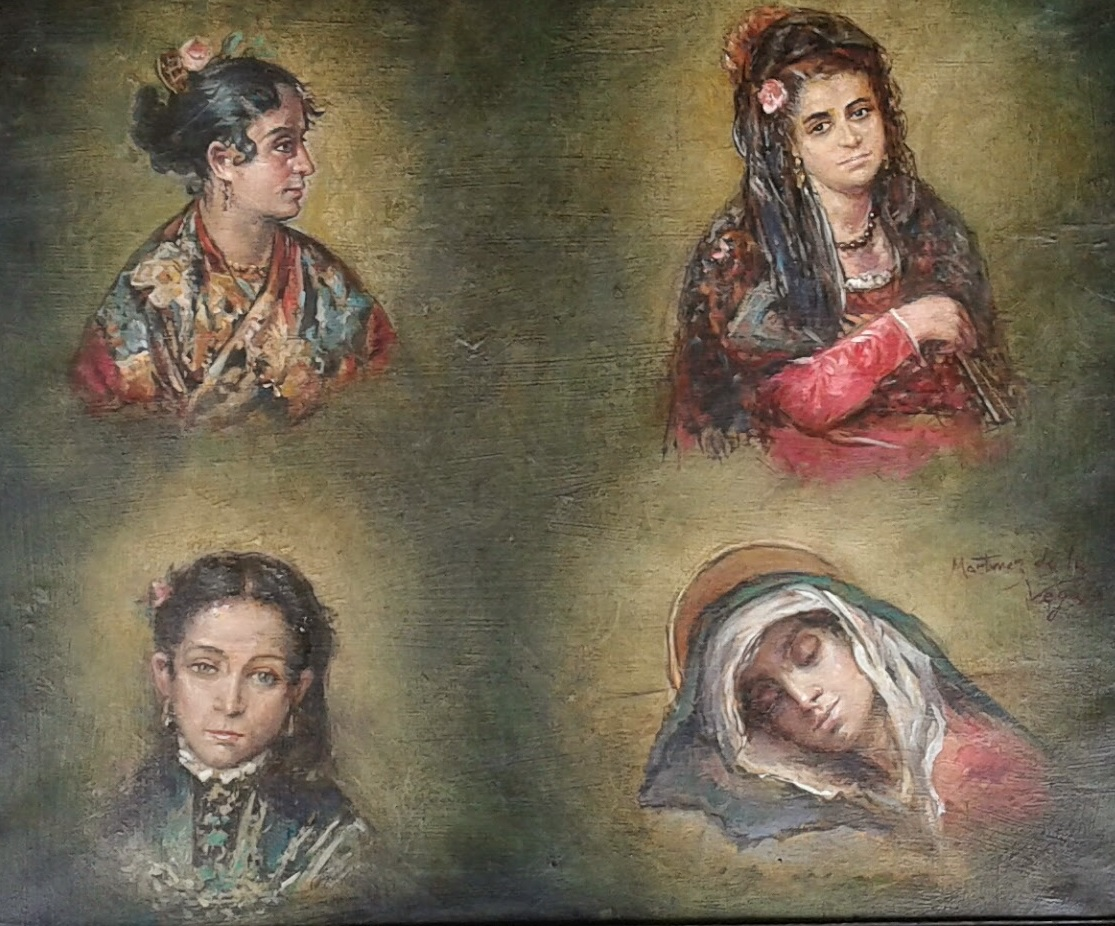
Four Memories (c. 1893), private collection.

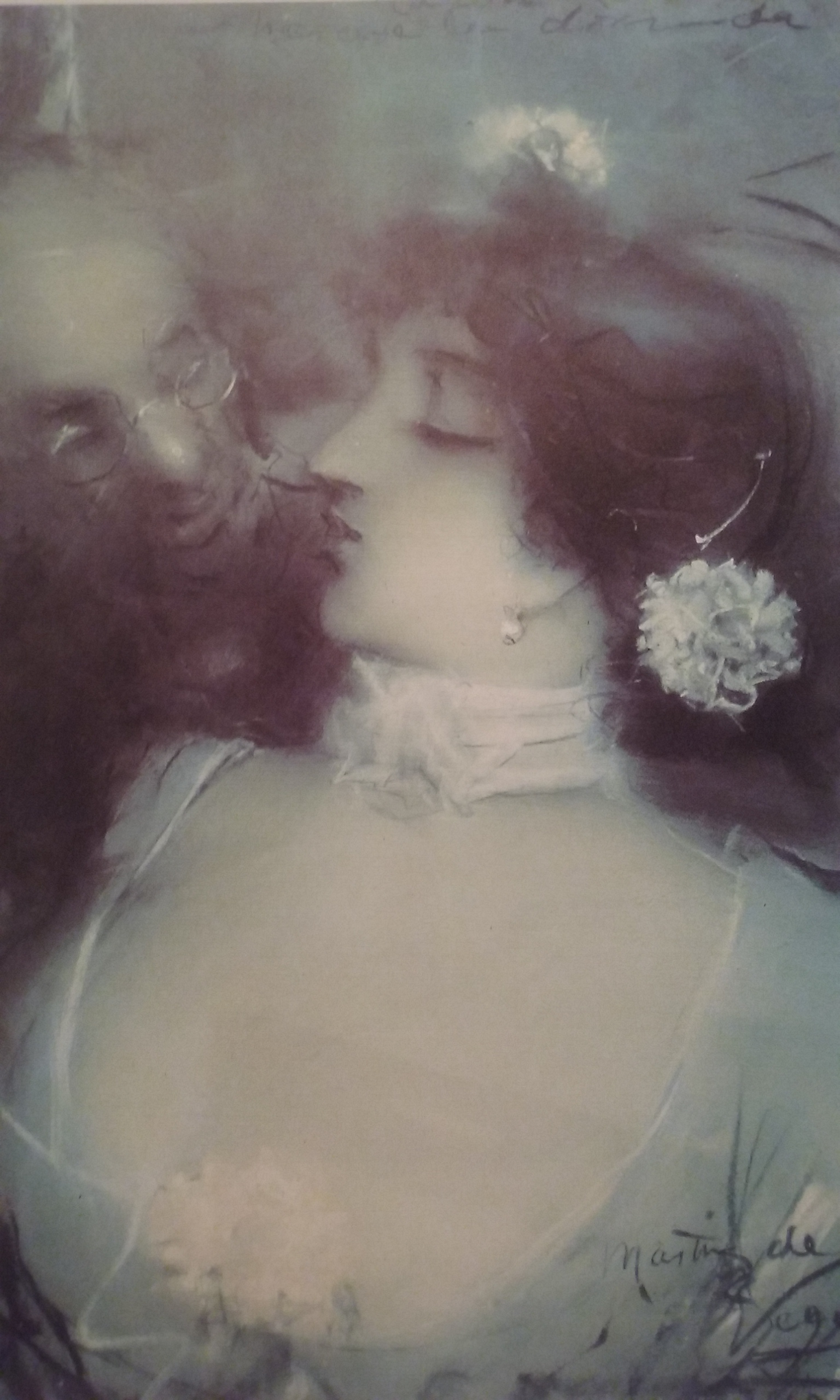
Pretending to Be Asleep (c. 1895), private collection.

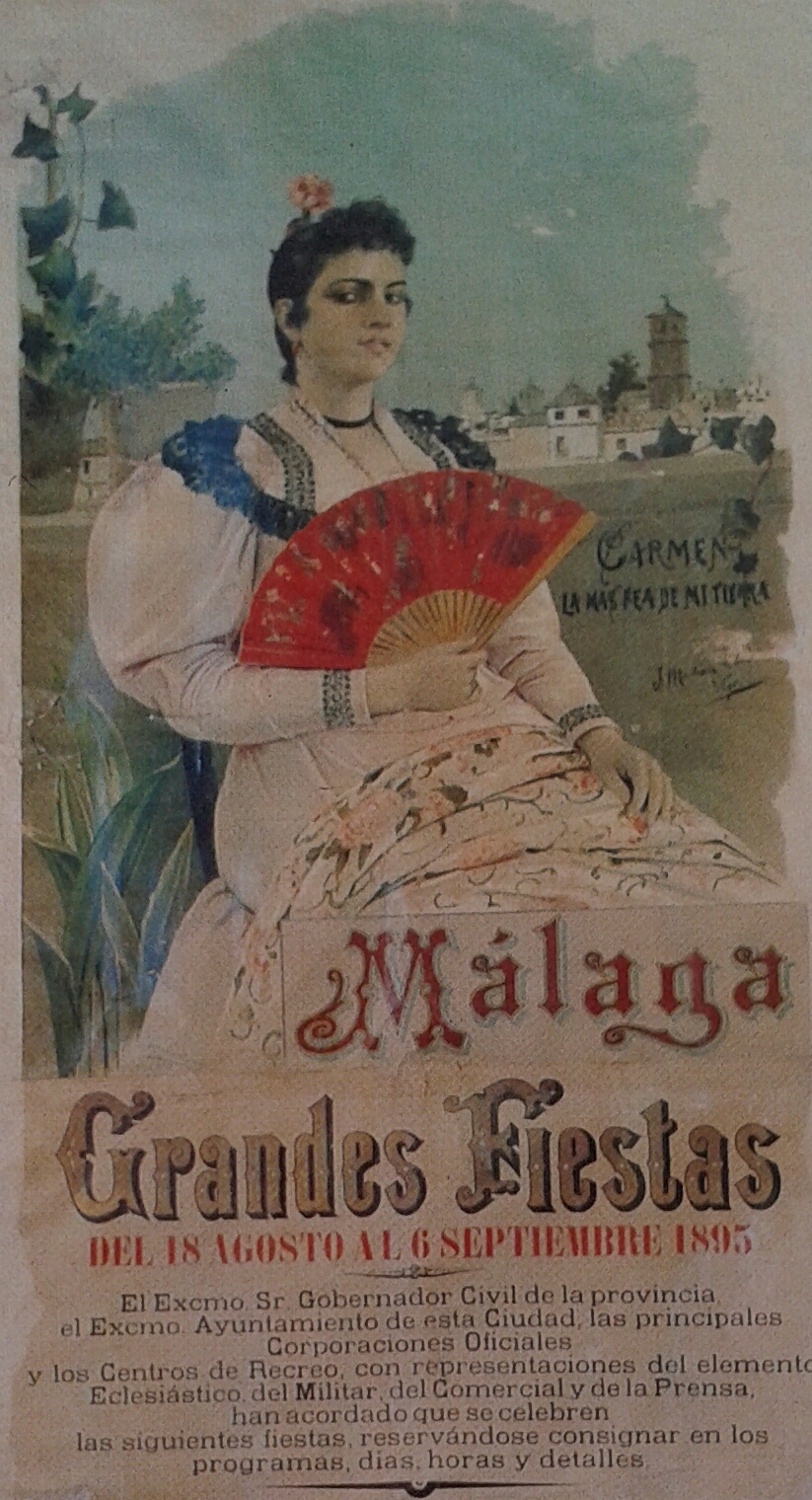
Carmen, the Ugliest in my Hometown (poster for the Feria de Agosto, 1895), Málaga Town Council.

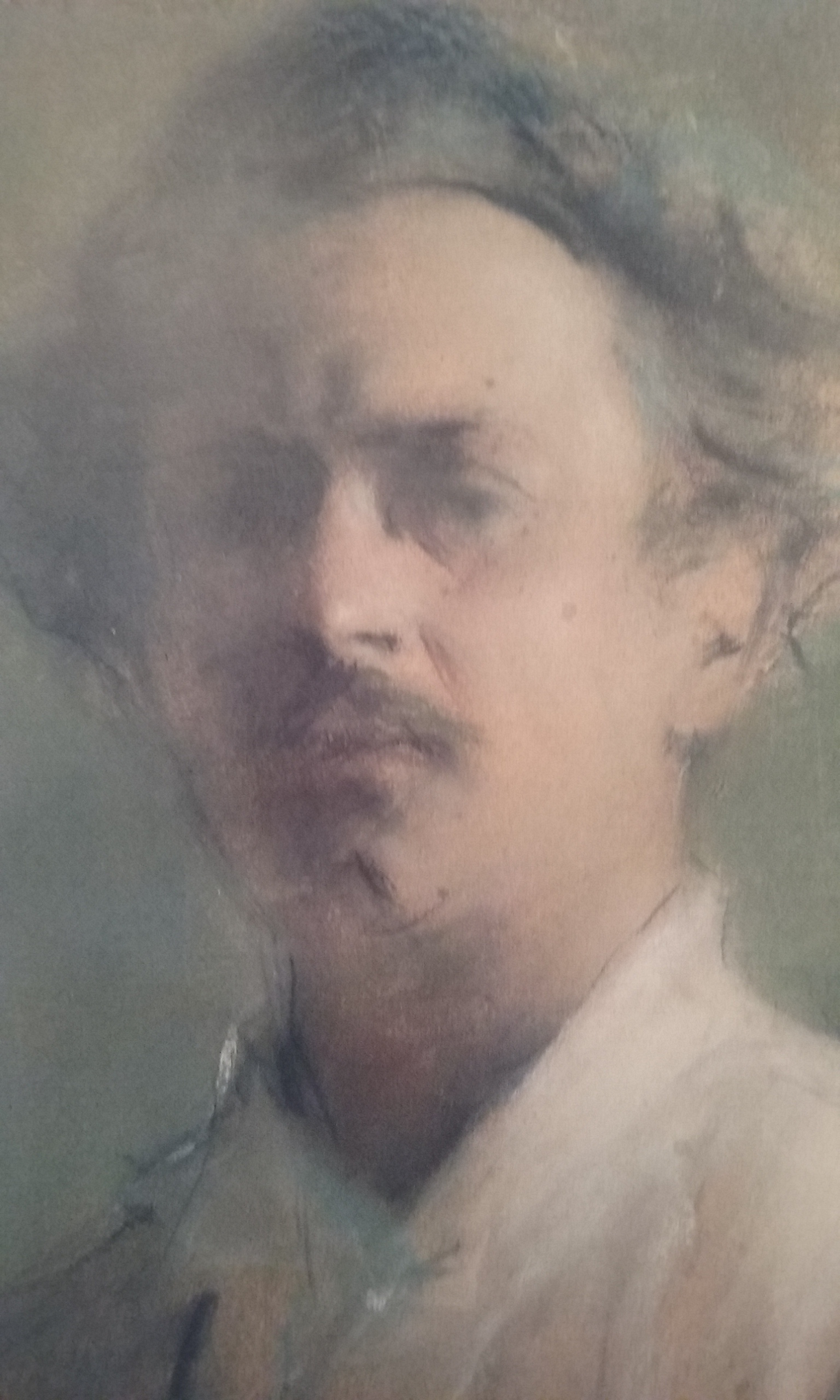
Self-Portrait (c. 1900), private collection

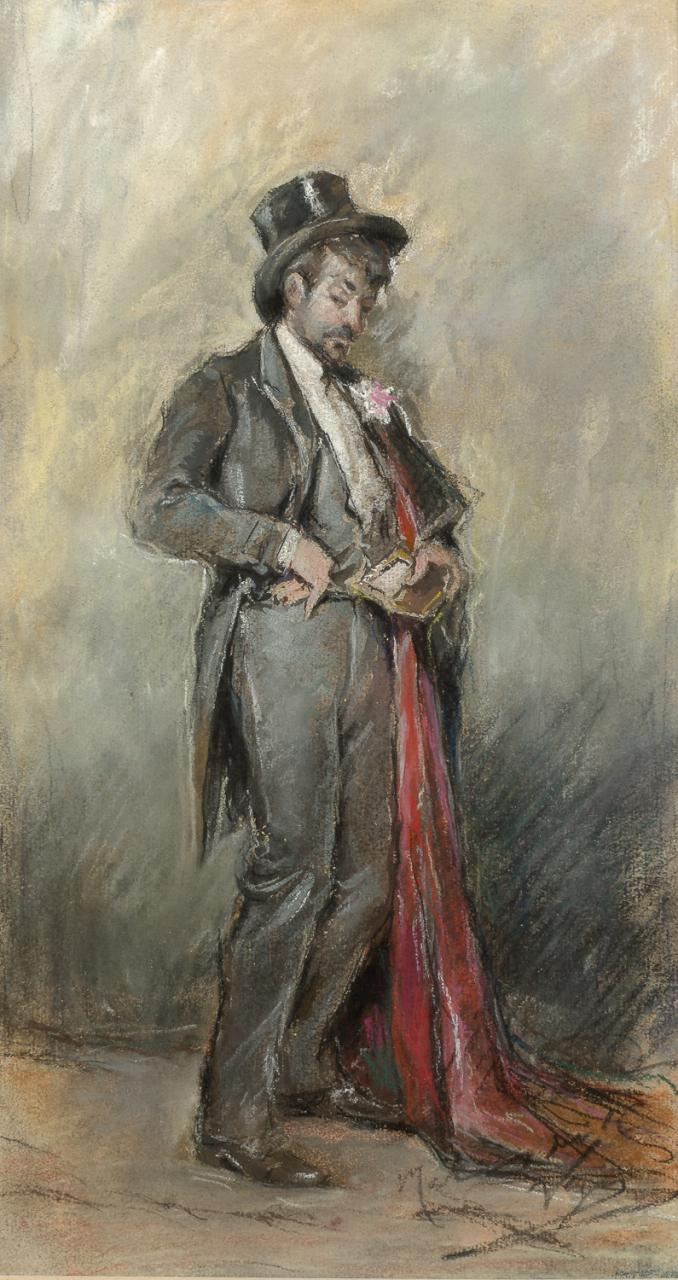
Crapula (c. 1900), private collection.

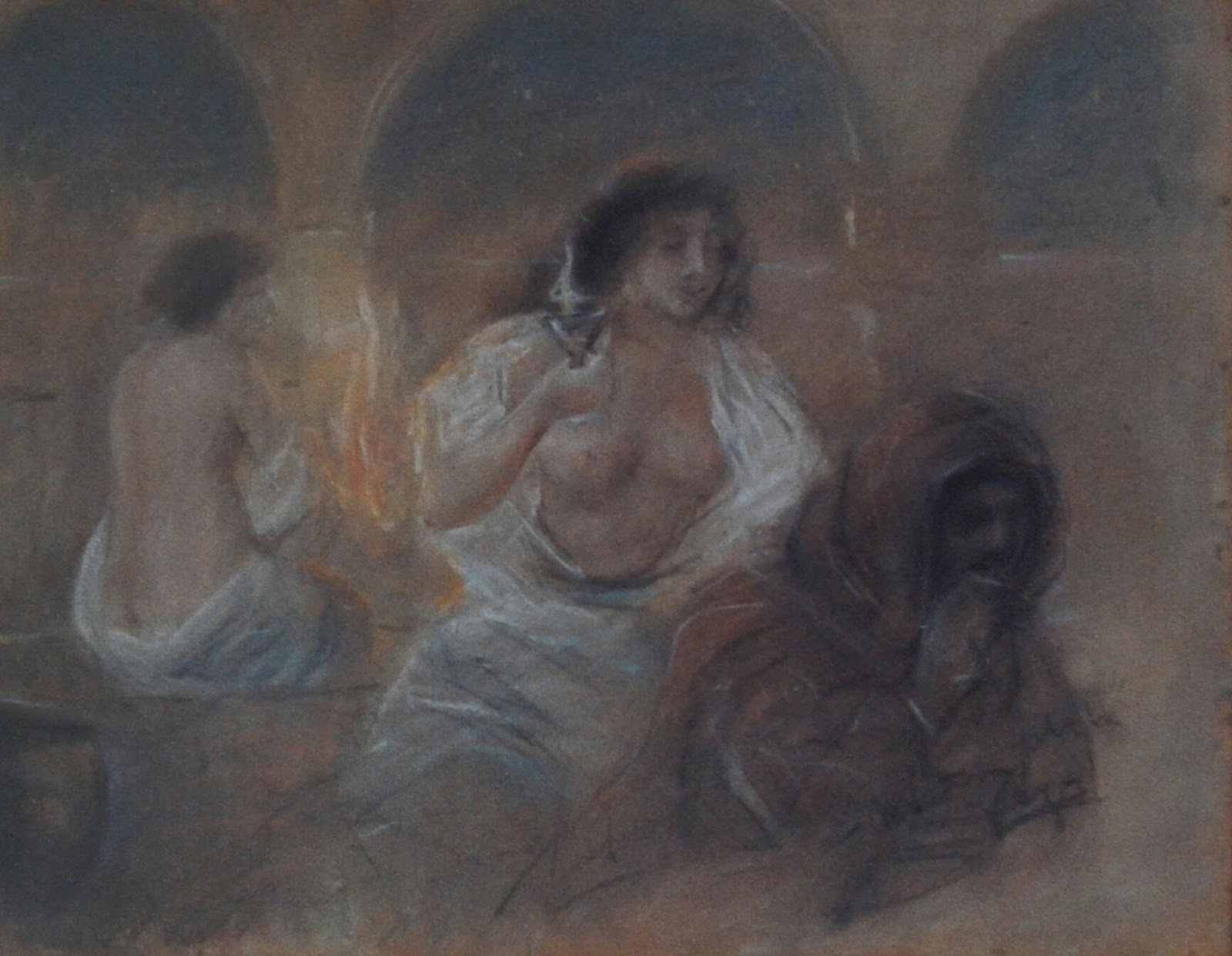
The Temptations of St. Anthony (c. 1900), private collection.
