= Antonio María Reyna Manescau =

Italian painter (1859–1937)

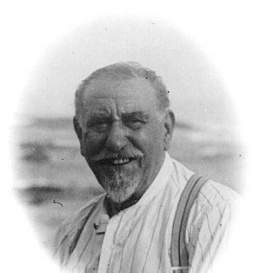
- Born: 5 December 1859; Coín, Málaga, Spain
- Died: 3 February 1937 (aged 77); Rome, Italy
- Education: Málaga School of Fine Arts
- Known for: Painting

Antonio María de la Concepción Reyna Manescau, variously cited as Antonio María (de) Reyna Manescau or simply Antonio Reyna Manescau (Spanish: [an'tonio 'reina manes'kau]; 5 December 1859 – 3 February 1937), was a Spanish painter who developed most of his career in Italy. Arguably a member of the Málaga School of Painting, he studied under Bernardo Ferrándiz and alongside Moreno Carbonero. He moved to Italy in his early 20s, where he was further influenced by Italian and Spanish expatriate artists, and where he lived for the rest of his life.

After his first visit to Venice in 1885, he specialized in landscape painting. He is widely known for the preciosity of his Venetian vedutas, the importance he places in the accurate depiction of architectural detail and his mastery of color. Among his most important works are his numerous views of the Venetian canals and Piazza San Marco, the classical scene Floralia (which disappeared during the Spanish Civil War) and Rancho Andaluz.

== Early life and education ==
Born in the town of Coín (Málaga), he was one of ten children (six of which died in childhood) of Francisco Reyna Zayas (1825–1892) and Matilde Manescau y Otsman (1823–1910). His parents enjoyed a good social standing, with his uncle José Reyna Zayas being mayor of Coín while Antonio was a child.

As a boy Antonio showed a great ability for drawing. Although he continued living in Coín for the rest of his childhood, he began his artistic training at the School of Fine Arts in Malaga, where he was taught by Joaquín Martínez de la Vega, first, and then by Bernardo Ferrándiz, founder of the Málaga School of Painting. He studied alongside future master José Moreno Carbonero, who was just a year older than him. From a young age he exhibited his works regularly, standing out in the local artistic environment for his use of colors, the attractiveness of his compositions and the agility of his brushwork. In 1880, at age 20, he sold his first important work for the town hall of Coín.

== Career ==
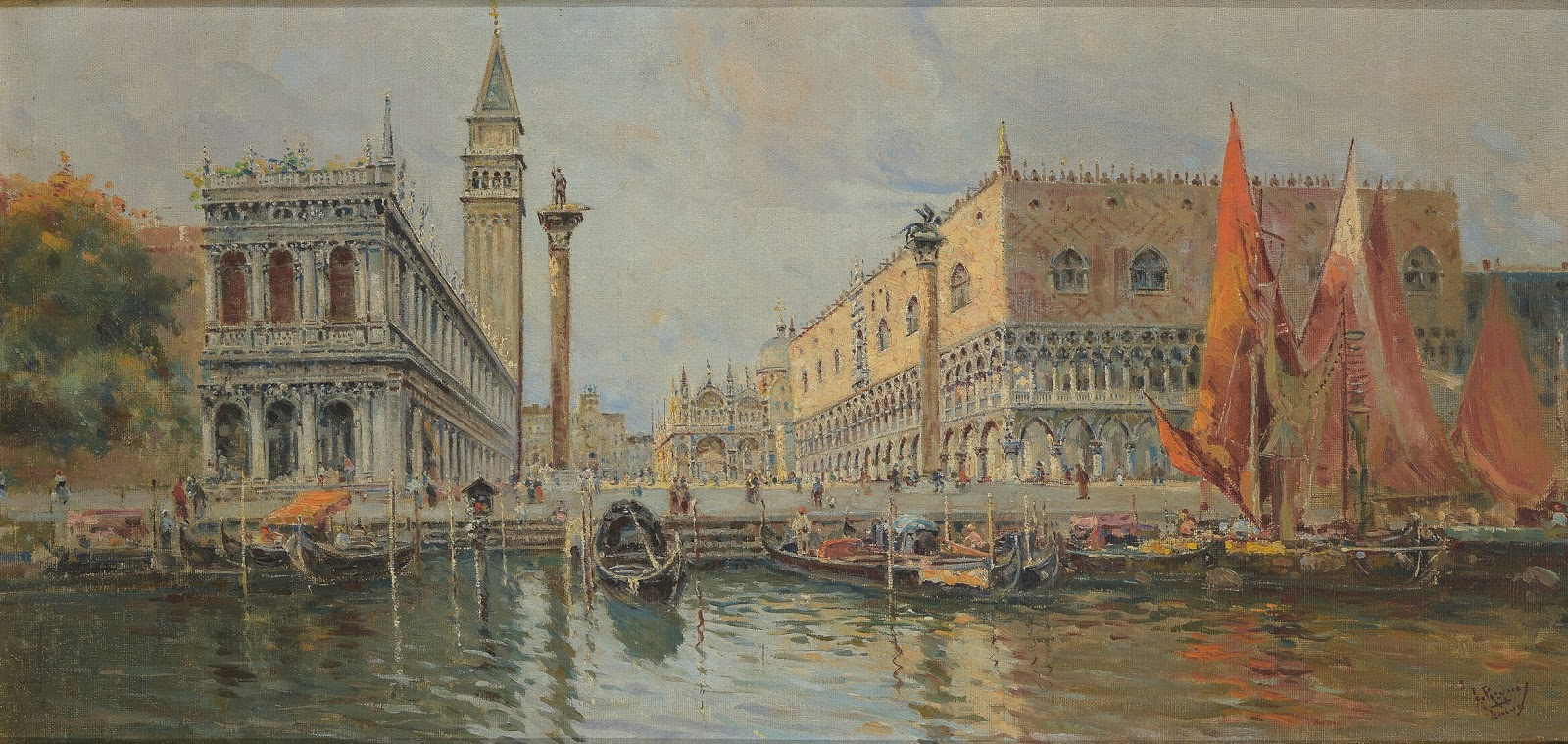
Grand Canal and Piazza San Marco. Private collection.

In 1882, he received a scholarship from the Provincial Council to further his art studies in Italy. He moved to Rome (where he was to live until his death), and in 1885 visited Venice; from that year on, Venetian landscapes, showing landmarks like the Grand Canal and Piazza San Marco but also less known quarters of the city, are ubiquitous in his work. Venice was at that time an artistic hub for Spanish painters, thanks in part to Fortuny's widow residing there, and also because of the Venetian production of Villegas Cordero and Martín Rico, whose preciosity in the depiction of the landscape was adopted by Reyna Manescau.

Although his scholarship was supposed to finish in 1886, he was captivated by Italy and remained there. In Rome he frequently visited the workshop of Villegas Cordero, like so many other Spaniards, and under his influence he produced some oriental paintings. At the same time, as a member of the Spanish colony, he was a regular in tertulias in the Café El Greco. In 1889 he married the opera singer Beatriz Mililotti Desantis, then 20, and settled to live in Rome.

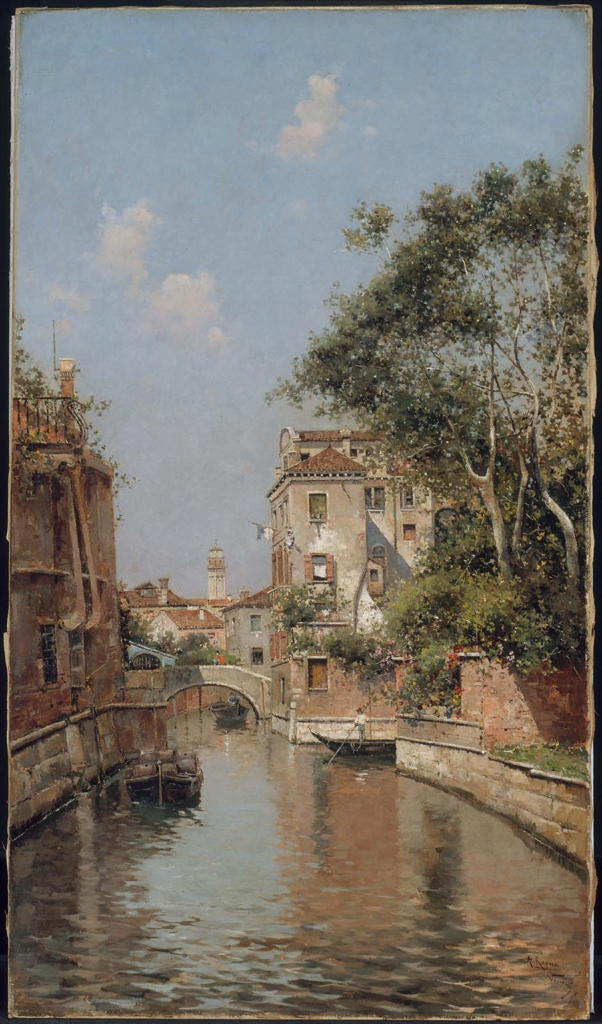
Canal in Venice. Museum of Fine Arts, Boston.

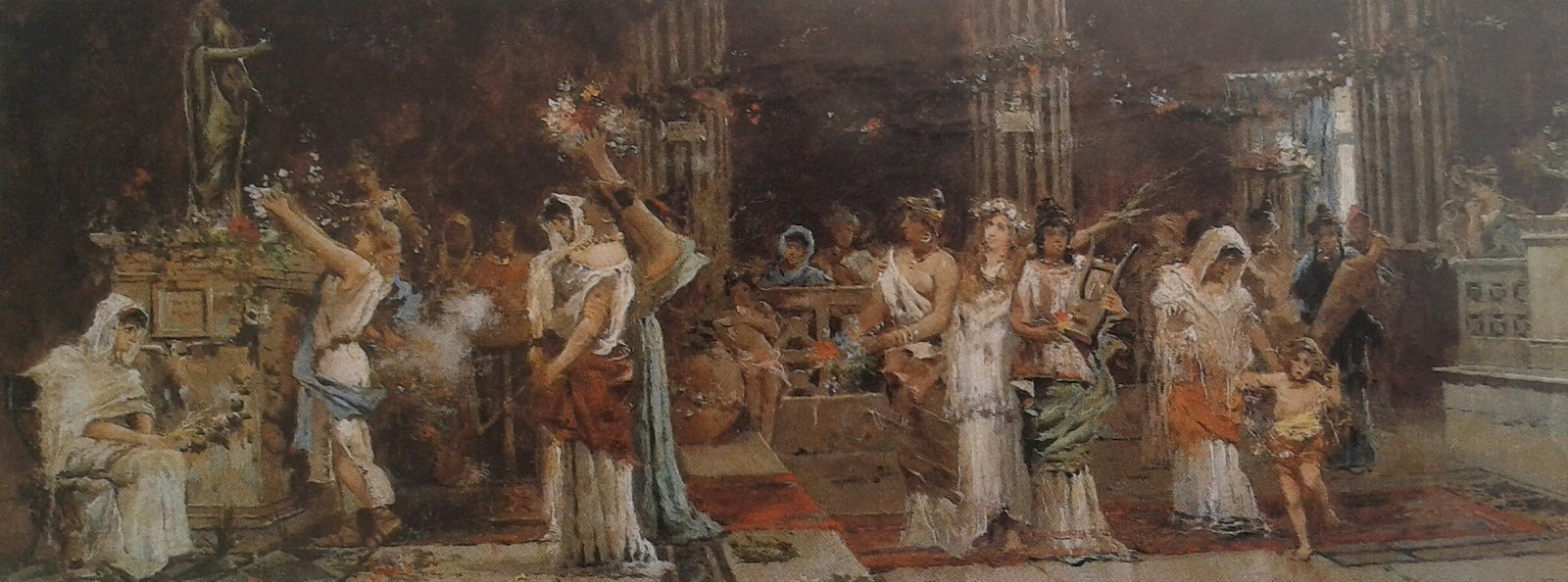
Sketch for Floralia. Private Collection.

Influenced by classical antiquity, by the mid 1880s he painted his lost masterwork Floralia, a classical scene that represents the annual festival celebrated in honor of the mythical goddess Flora and the arrival of spring. In order to achieve a meticulous representation of the ornaments and mosaics, he traveled to southern Italy to study the Pompeian wall paintings and the Farnese model of the Museum of Naples. In 1887 he sent the painting from Rome to Madrid, where it was exhibited at the National Exhibition of Fine Arts, obtaining a medal that earned him fame also in Spain. The painting was acquired by the Spanish State and sent to Barcelona, disappearing in the Civil War. Today this work is known just by old reproductions in the catalog of the 1887 exhibition and by a beautiful smaller working sketch that still survives.

In 1895, Antonio, then 36 years of age, was already a recognized and awarded painter. That year, while his brother Ricardo was appointed mayor of Coín, Antonio was invited by the Ateneo de Madrid board to decorate their headquarters. While in Madrid, the King of Spain, Alfonso XIII, made him a Knight of the Royal Order of Carlos III, the highest distinction awarded to a Spanish artist at that time. He also exported his work to London, where his Venetian views were exhibited several times. In Italy, his frequent exhibitions in Rome culminated with three of his paintings, entitled Roma sparita, being acquired by the fine arts museum of this city.

As his fame consolidated, he painted two portraits of Pope Benedict XV, that entered the Vatican Museum, and regularly exhibited his production, traveling constantly in Italy. He worked for long periods in Assisi, where he visited the Benlliure brothers, of whom he was a friend, and also in Naples, where he studied the works of the Resina and Posillipo schools. Although in this stage he painted numerous realistic paintings, he still produced Venetian landscapes and vedutas, and views of the outskirts of Rome. On August 4, 1899, his only daughter, María Matilde, was born.

His mother Matilde died in Coín on September 7, 1910, and Antonio travelled to his hometown for her funeral. During his stay he painted a large canvas titled Rancho Andaluz, in which a family property known as 'Cortijo Ricardo' is represented. He exhibited this work in the Spanish pavilion at the International Exhibition of Fine Arts held in Rome in 1911. The painting is currently in the town hall of Coín.

Reyna Manescau's works are represented at museums such as the Boston Museum of Fine Arts, the Hermitage Museum, the Carmen Thyssen Museum and the Málaga Museum, and are also present in various private collections, such as the Bellver Collection in Seville or the Pedrera Martínez Collection based in the Sorzano de Tejada Palace, Orihuela.

== Style and technique ==
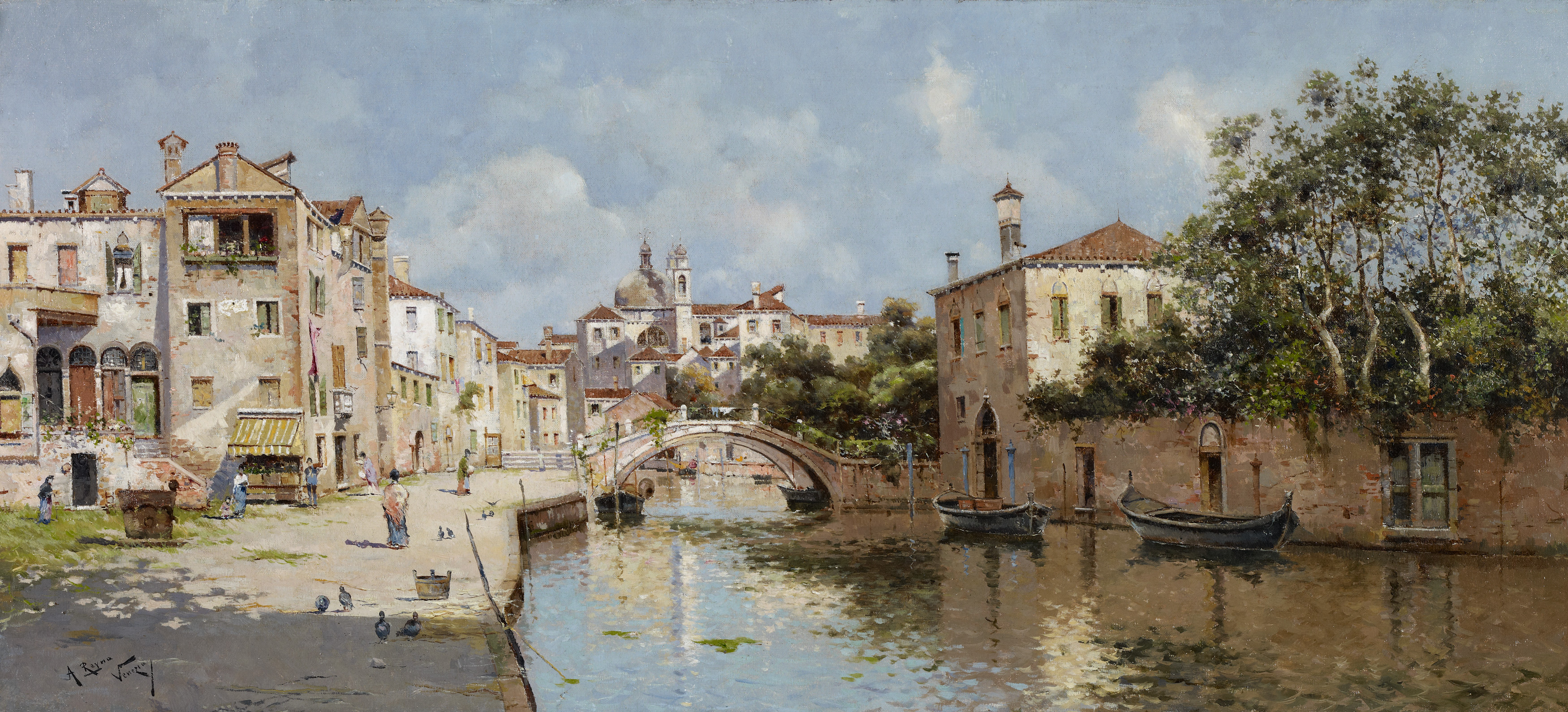
Venetian Canal. Carmen Thyssen Museum, Málaga.

Reyna Manescau was primarily a landscape and veduta painter that devoted most of his production to the city of Venice. He excelled at the painting, in small dimensions, of such urban landscapes, repeating them in many occasions with minimal variations. His creations are noted for his preciosity and the importance he places in the accurate depiction of architectural detail. In his painting he shows a great ability for drawing and an innate skill for composition, abundant richness of color and bold brushwork.

== Gallery ==
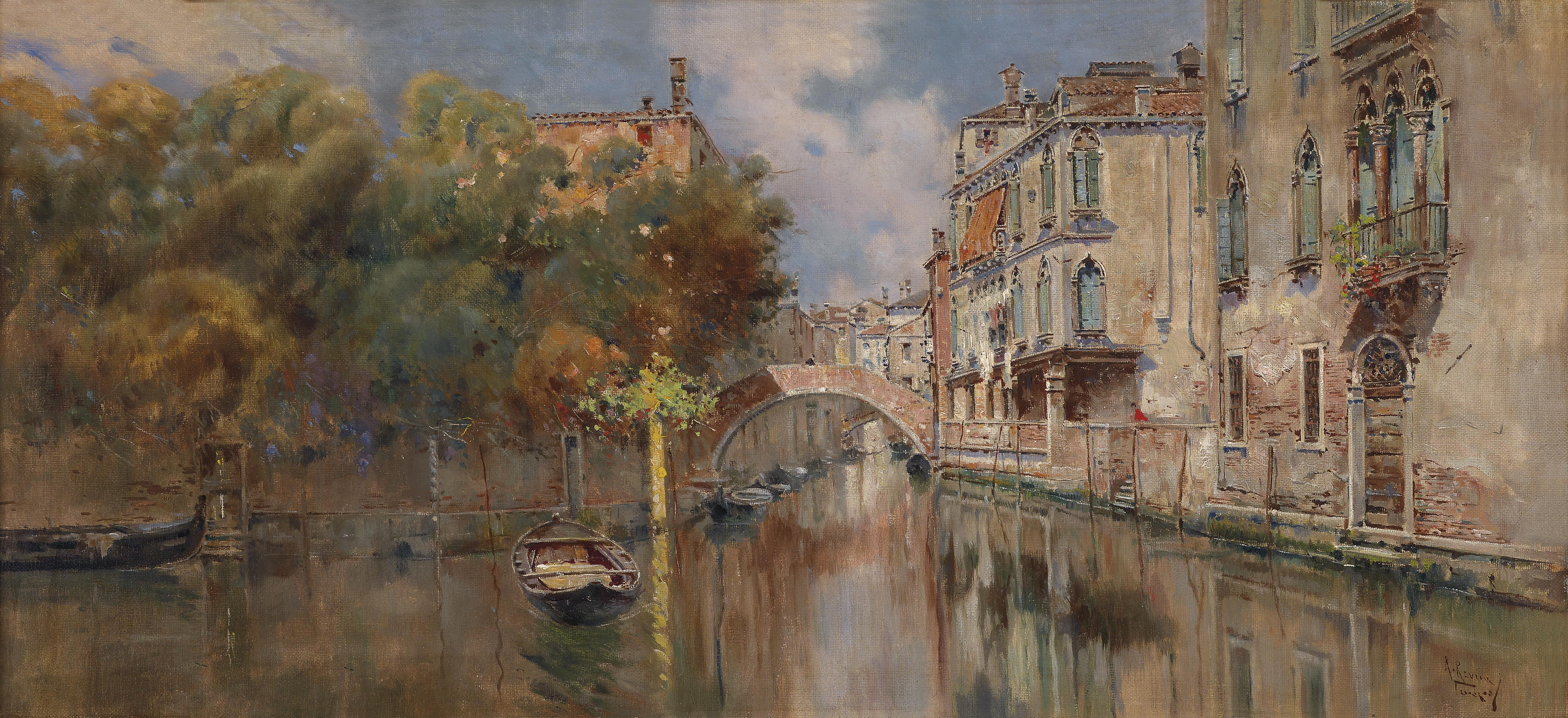
View of a Venetian Canal. Private collection.

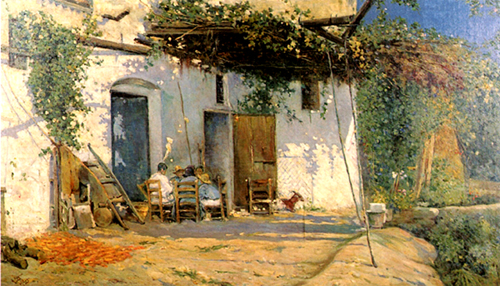
Rancho Andaluz. Coín Town Hall.

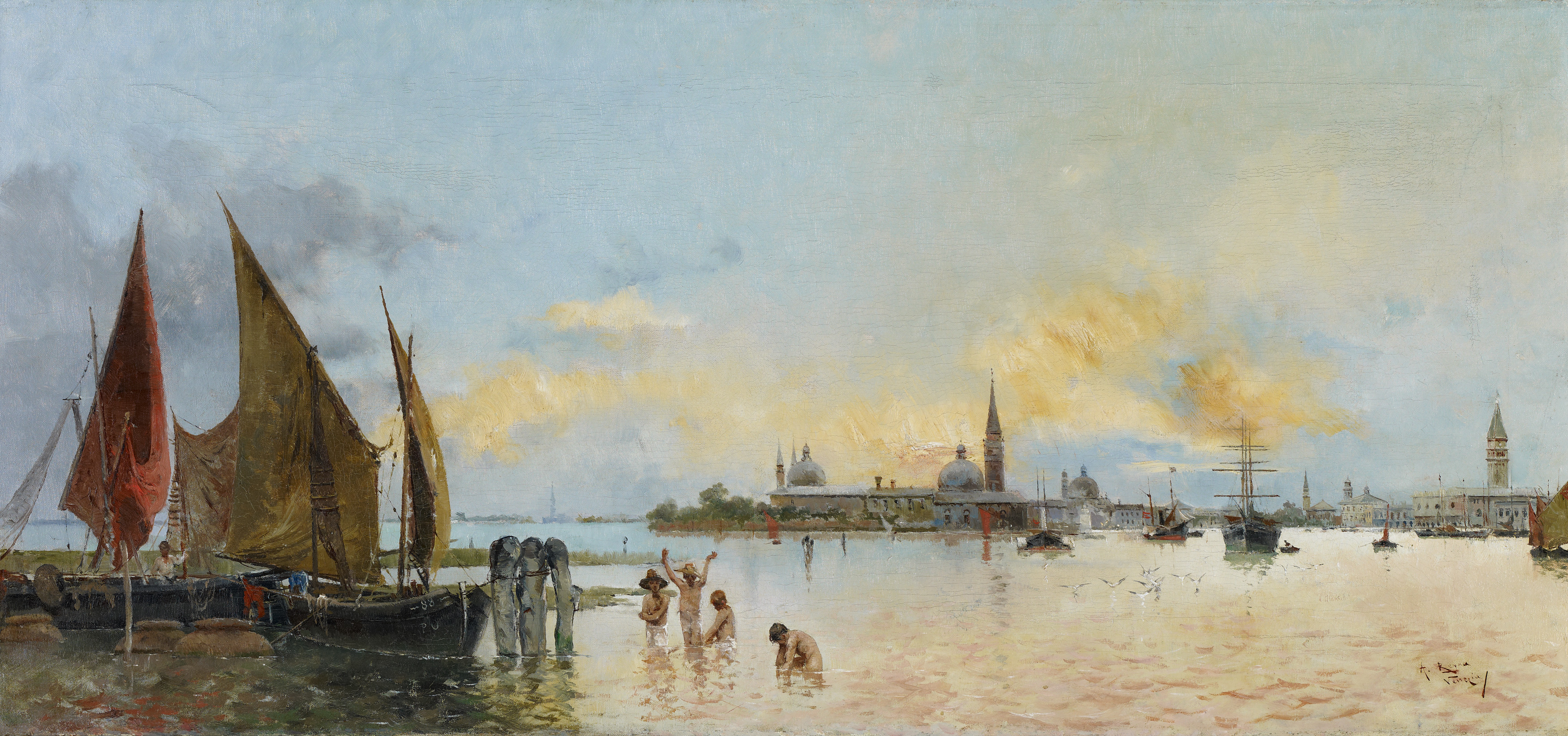
Venetian View. Carmen Thyssen Museum, Málaga.

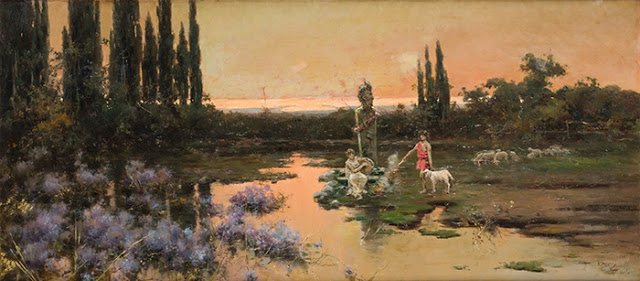
Pontine Marshes. Private collection.

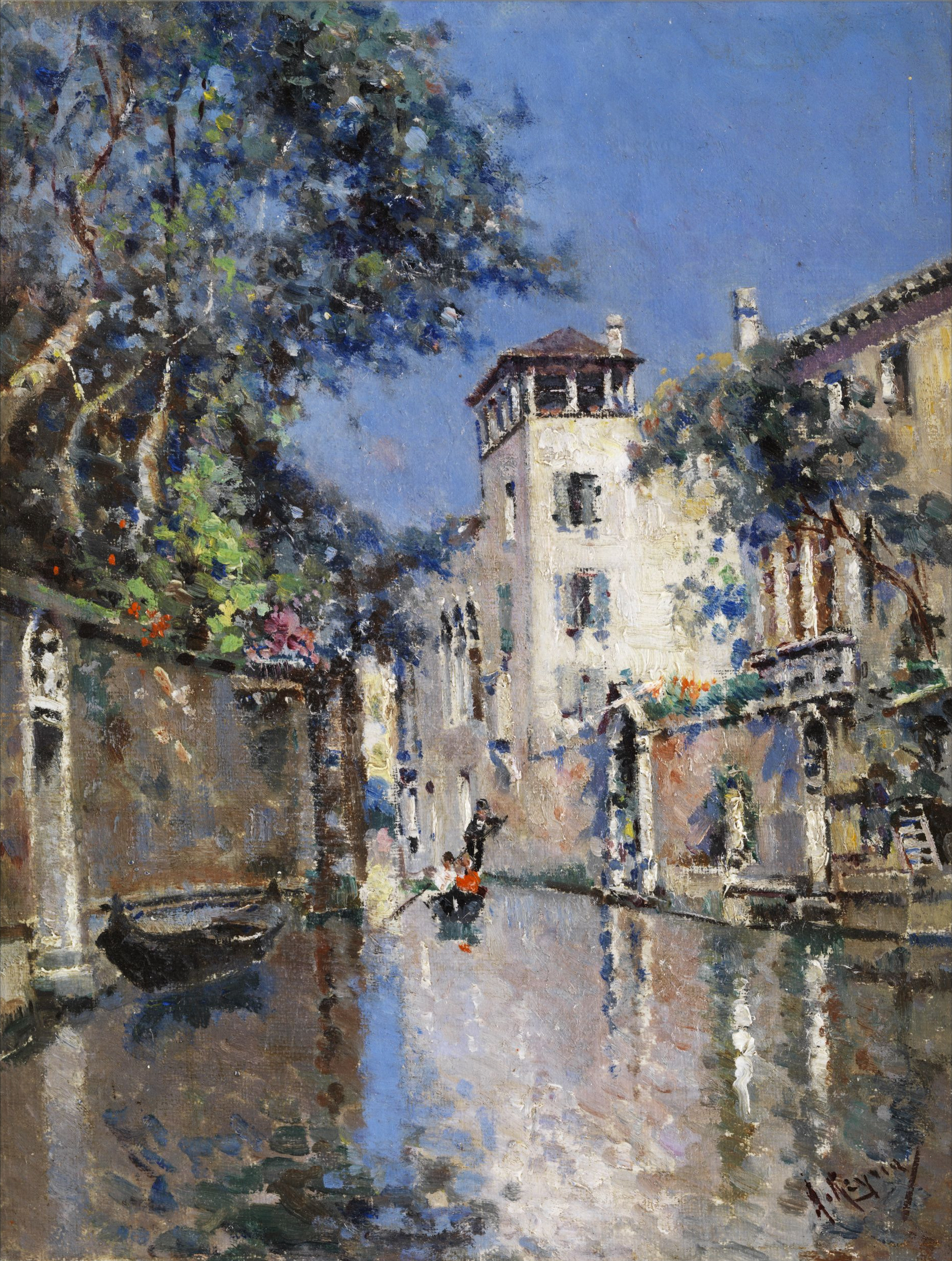
Venetian Canal. Private collection.

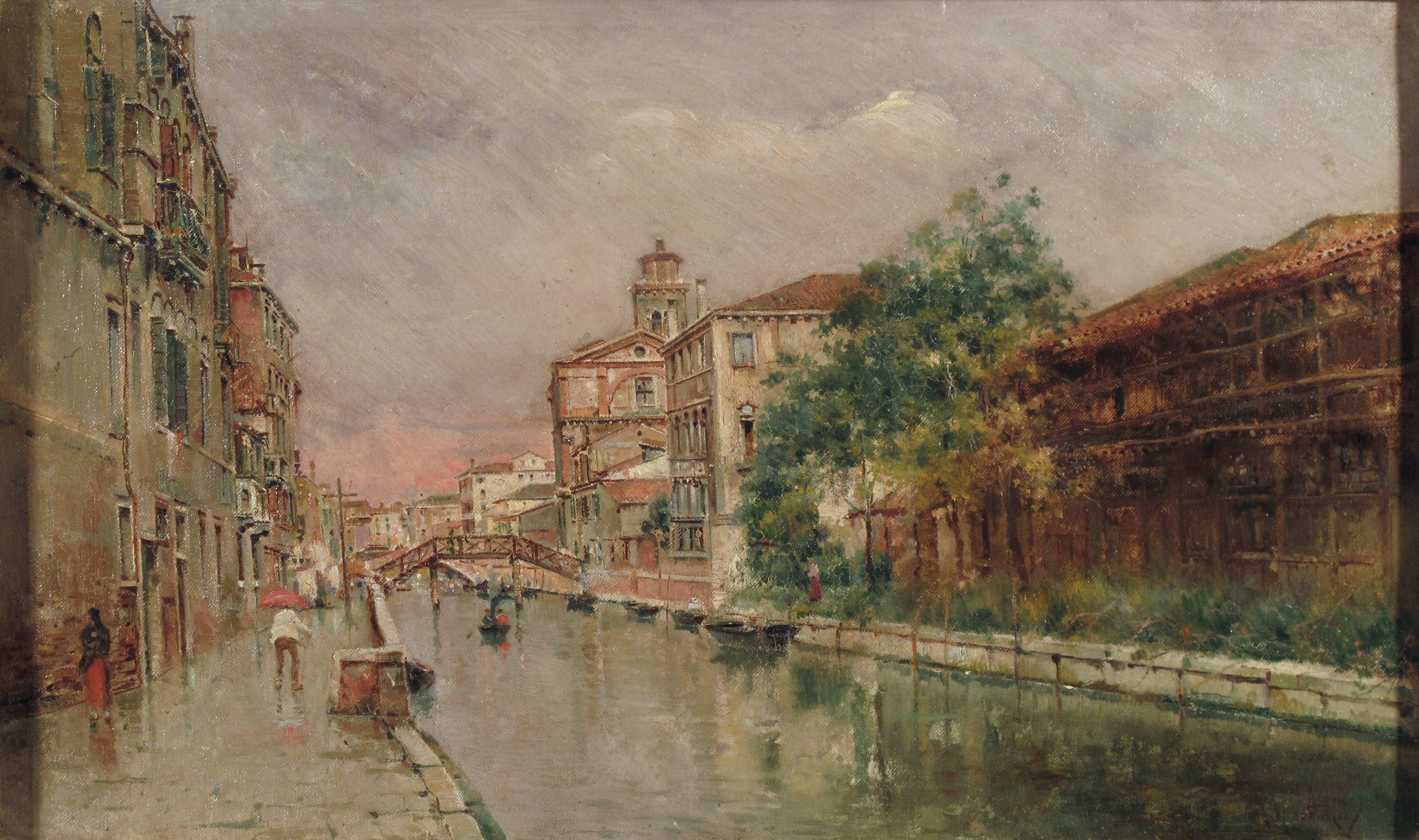
Venetian Canal. Centro studi sull'arte Lorenzo Pacini

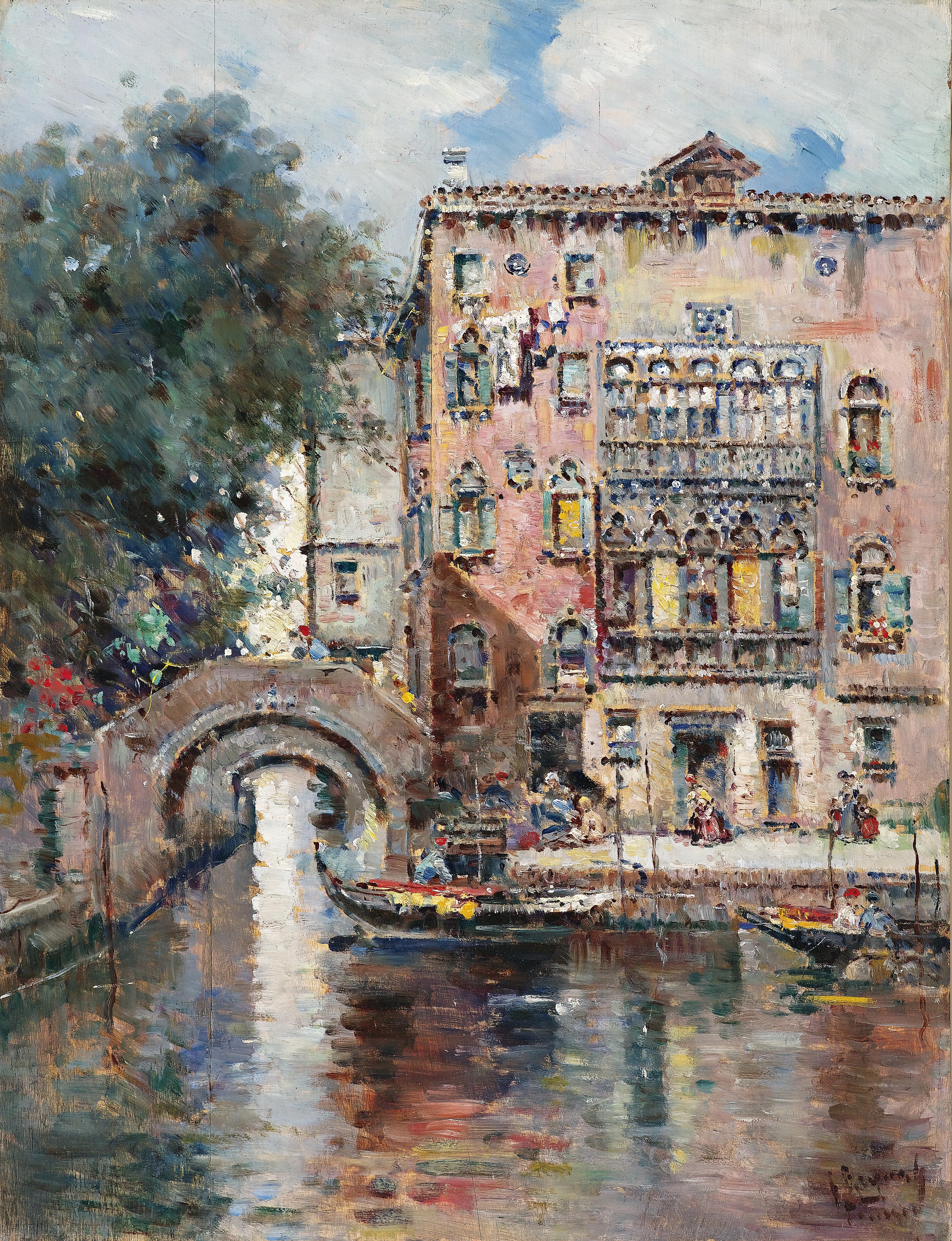
Gondolas in a Venetian Canal. Private collection.

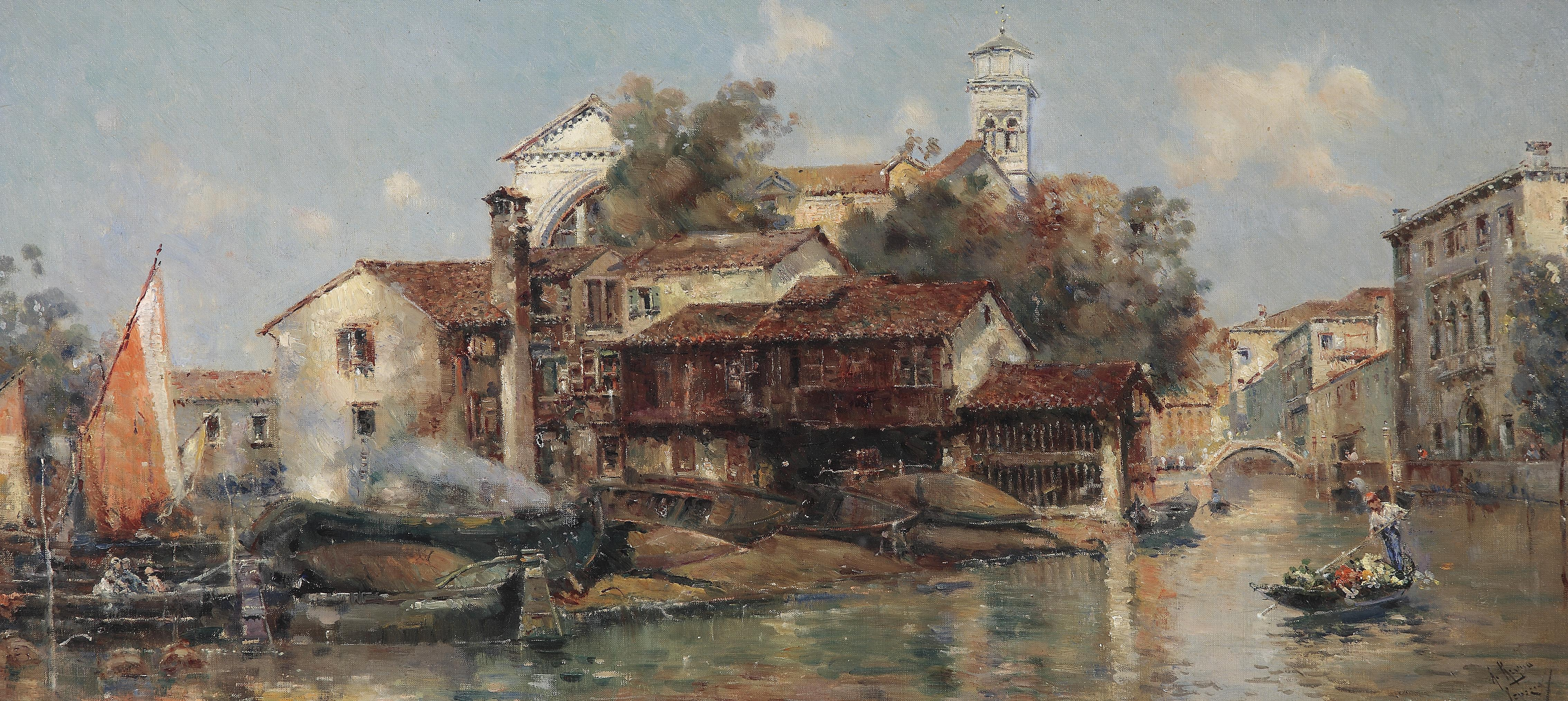
View of the Gondola Shipyard in San Trovasi, Venice. Private collection.

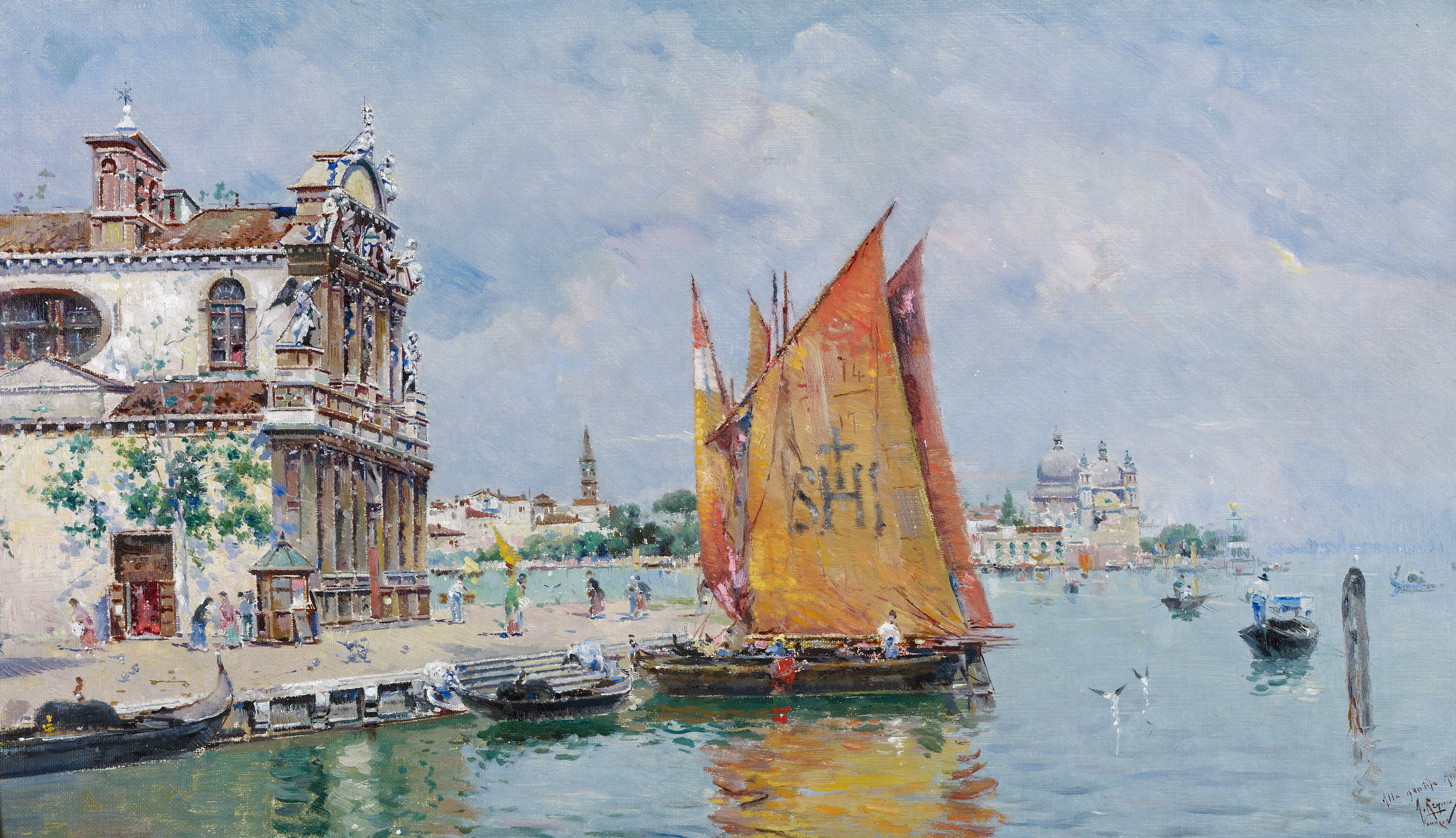
Venice. Carmen Thyssen Museum, Málaga.

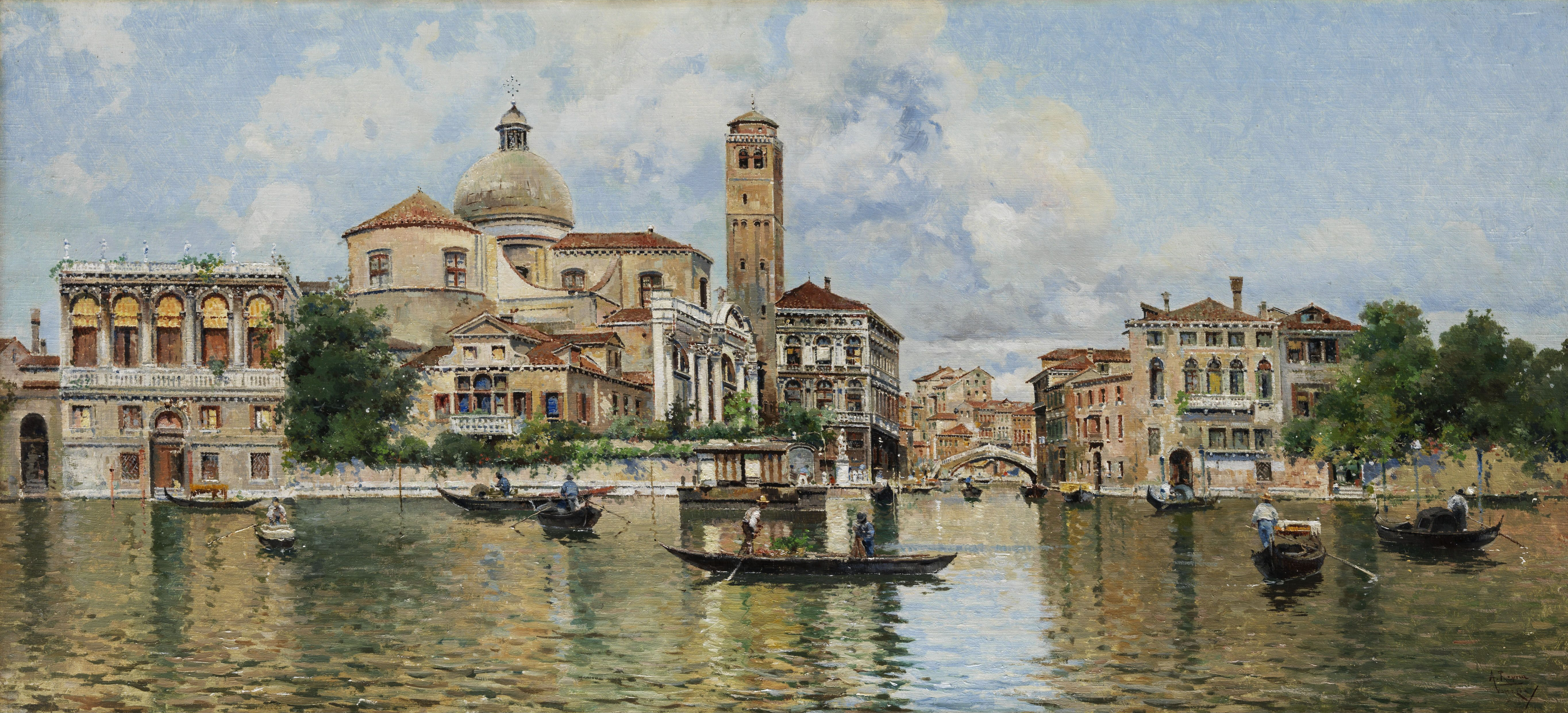
Venetian Veduta. Private collection.

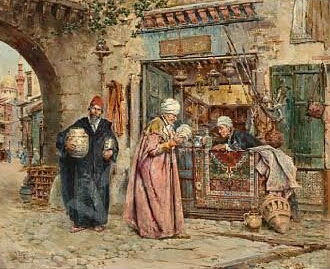
The First Sale of the Day. Private collection.
