= Badenes =

Badenes or Bádenes is a surname. Notable people with the surname include:

- Bernardo Ferrándiz Bádenes (1835–1885), Spanish painter
- Elisa Badenes, Spanish ballet dancer
- Manuel Badenes (1928–2007), Spanish footballer
