= José Denis Belgrano =

Spanish painter (1844–1917)

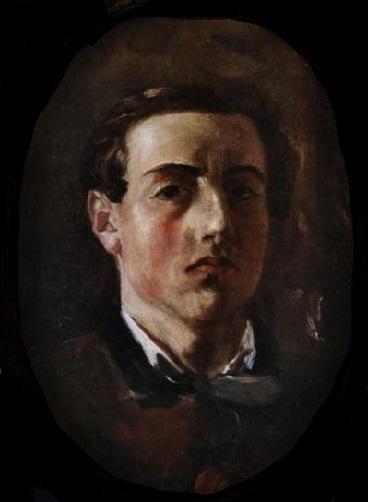
- Self portrait of the painter
- Born: April 8, 1844; Málaga
- Died: February 12, 1917 (aged 72)
- Known for: painting

José Denis Belgrano (April 8, 1844, in Málaga – February 12, 1917) was a Spanish painter.

Belgrano was given a scholarship by Carlos Larios, Marquess of Guadiaro, to study in Rome where he lived for two years. Back to Málaga, he registered at the Malaga Art School in 1868, present-day Faculty of Fine Arts of the University of Málaga, where he was a student of Bernardo Ferrándiz. After two more years in Rome in the mid-1870s, he became professor at this school in 1887.
