= Feria de Agosto =

Spanish festival

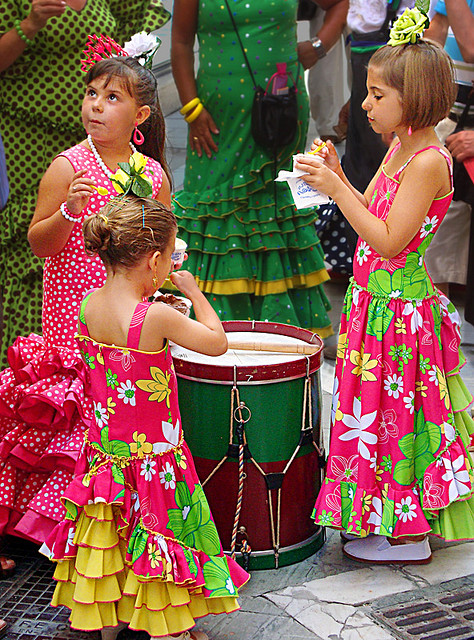
- Many children at the Feria de Málaga wore traditional dresses.
- Dates: Ten nights and nine days in August, ending on a Sunday
- Locations: Málaga, Andalusia, Spain
- Founded: 1491 / 1887

The Feria de Agosto ("August Fair") or Feria de Málaga ("Málaga Fair") is a street fair that takes place every August in the city of Málaga, Andalusia, Spain.

== History ==
The Feria de Agosto commemorates the taking of the city by the Catholic Monarchs (Isabella I of Castile and Ferdinand II of Aragon) on 18 August 1487 (five years before the completion of the Reconquista), at which time Málaga was incorporated into the Crown of Castile.

The Catholic Monarchs gave the city the religious statue of the Virgen de la Victoria ("Virgin of Victory"). The recently formed city government began a tradition of commemorating the taking of the city. The first such celebration took place in the form of a procession on the Feast Day of the Assumption, 15 August 1491. The following year the celebration was shifted to 18 August, the feast day of Saint Louis. That year there was a procession and a bullfight with four bulls. The celebration then continued on an annual basis.

In the 17th century, fireworks and rockets became part of the celebration. The procession carried the royal standard from the conquest of Málaga and proceeded from the Cathedral to the Church of Saint James the Apostle (Iglesia de Santiago Apóstol) where a mass was celebrated. The festivities eventually went into decline and the celebration of the Feast of Saint Louis became little more than a mass and sermon.

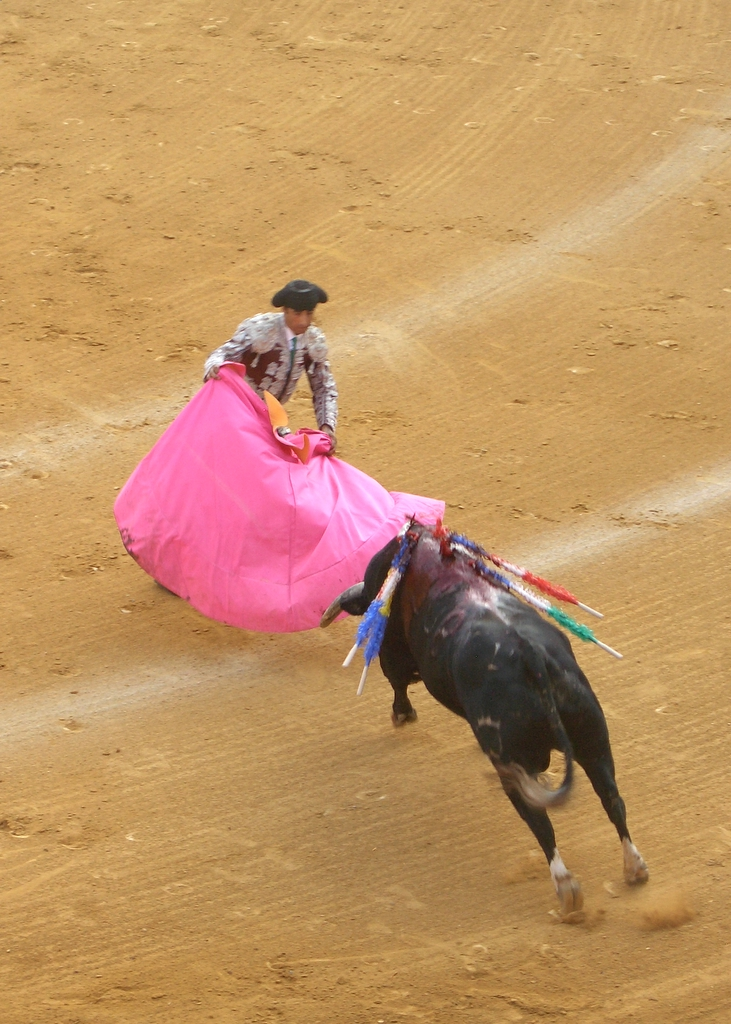
La Malagueta bullring during the Fair, 2006.

Later, coinciding with the liturgical celebrations of the chapter of the cathedral, the municipal government of Málaga established the popular festivities now celebrated on 15 August. In 1887, to commemorate the fourth centenary of the conquest, the festival was returned to the traditional date for the taking of Málaga by the Catholic Monarchs, with a procession of the Virgen de la Victoria, a procession simulating the entry of the Catholic Monarchs and their army, expositions of plants and flowers, regattas, concerts, bullfights, etc.

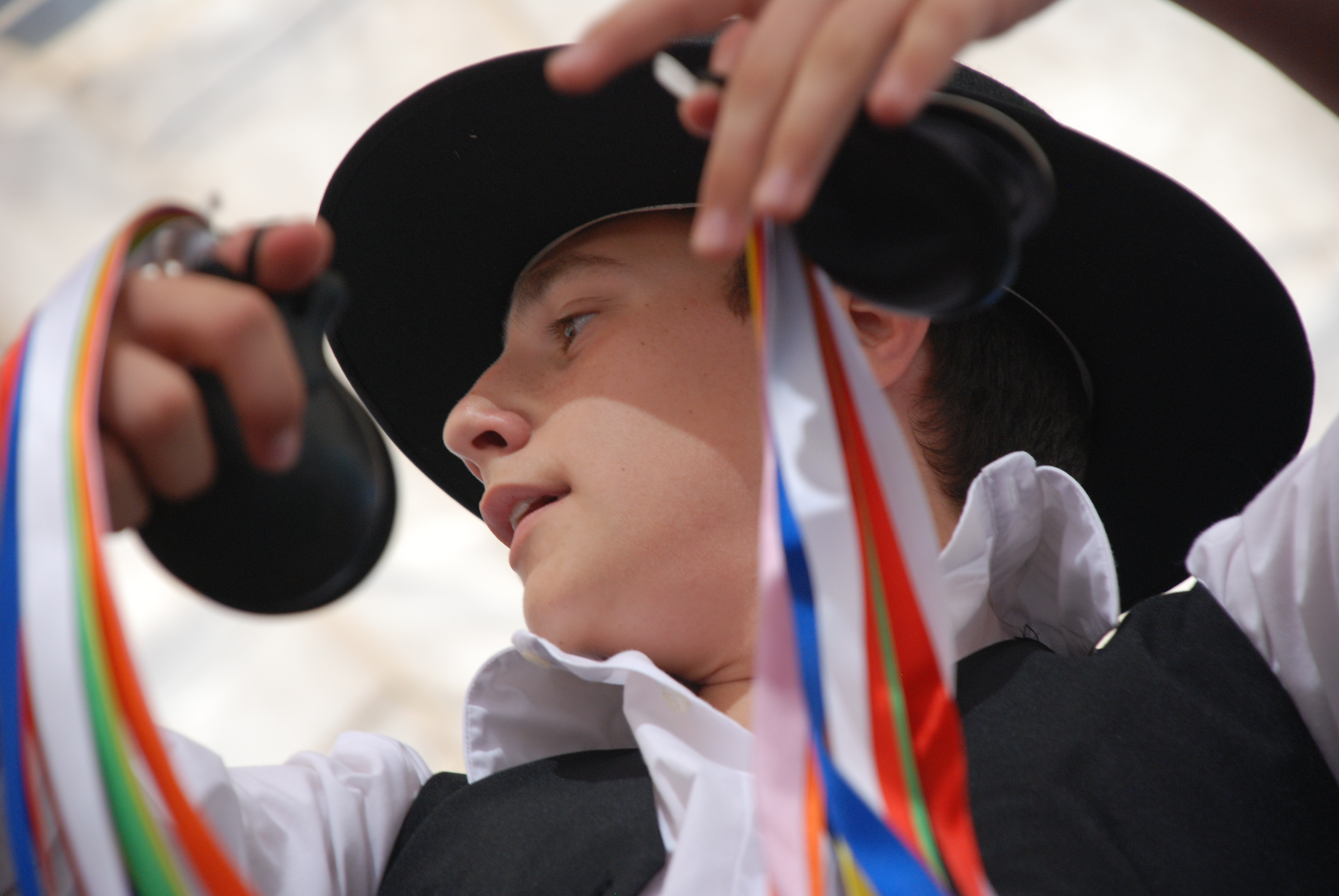
Verdiales dancer.

The Fair has had various locations in the course of its history since 1887. Initially, it was located along the water at the Muelle de Heredia, then in the nearby Parque de Málaga, then on the grounds of the Theatines, before finally settling in the Cortijo de Torres district, site of the Palacio de Ferias y Congresos de Málaga.

Nowadays, the fair begins just before midnight on a Friday and runs ten nights and nine days, ending on a Sunday night.

No Feria was held between 1915 and 1918 (World War I), 1940 to 1945 (World War II), or in 2020 (due to the COVID-19 pandemic).

== Activities ==
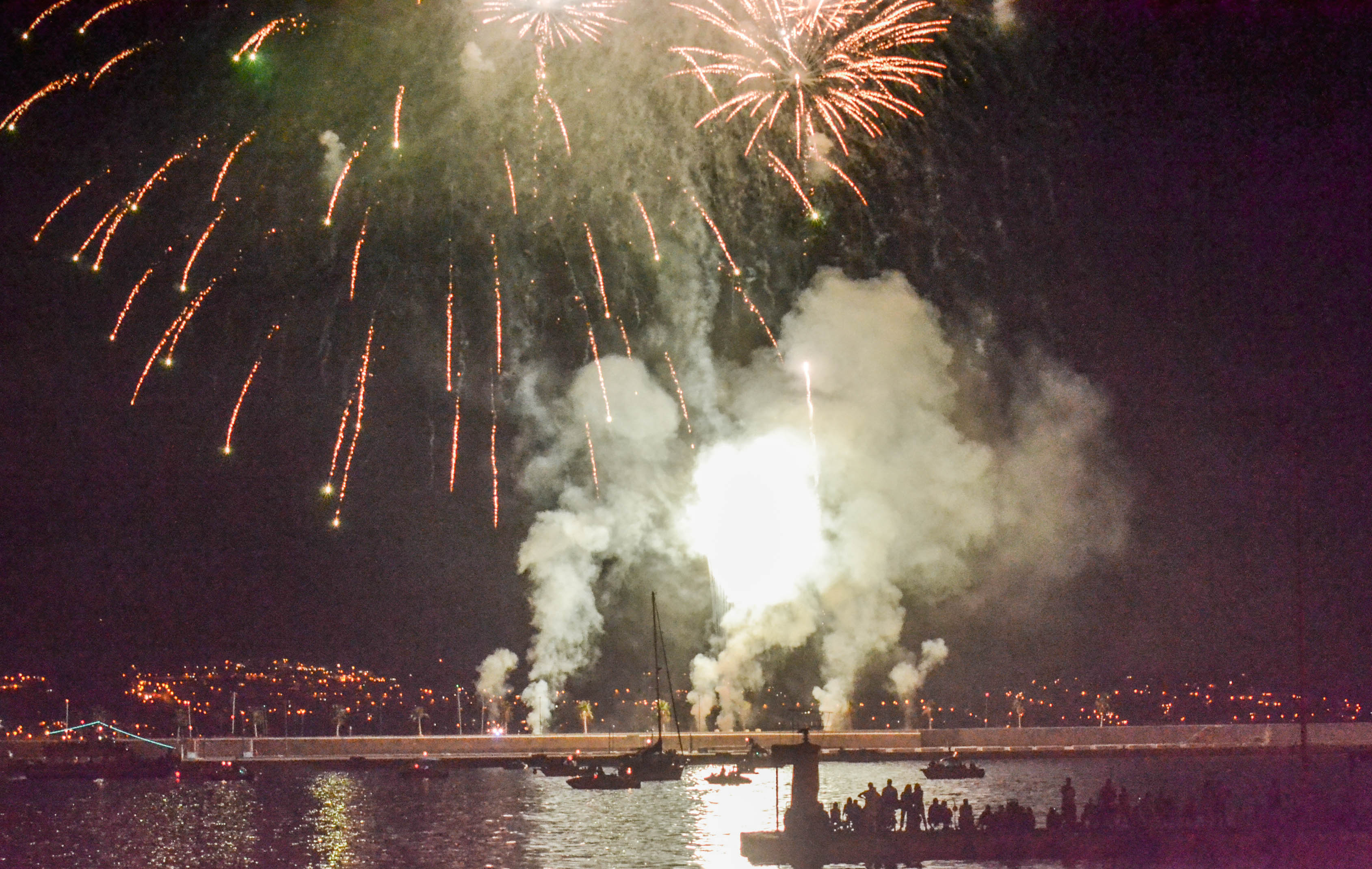
Fireworks

The fair today has two entertainment zones. The main one is the Real de la Feria in the Cortijo de Torres district, open in the evening for the "Feria de la noche" ("Night Fair"). Separately, in the historic center of the city, is the "Feria de día" ("Day Fair").

During the Fair, the streets of the city center are adorned with paper lanterns and floral displays. Booths are set up, there are performances for children and adults, music and dance (especially verdiales, the most characteristic local variant of flamenco), and decked-out horses and carriages attempting to make their way through it all. The sounds of flamenco and copla are everywhere, along with less traditional music.

There is bullfighting each afternoon at La Malagueta, and after sunset, the fair continues at the Real.

The city's public transit network is considerably restructured during the fair, including the addition of several special buses from various parts of town to the fair districts.
