= Bernardo Ferrándiz Bádenes =

Spanish artist (1835–1885)

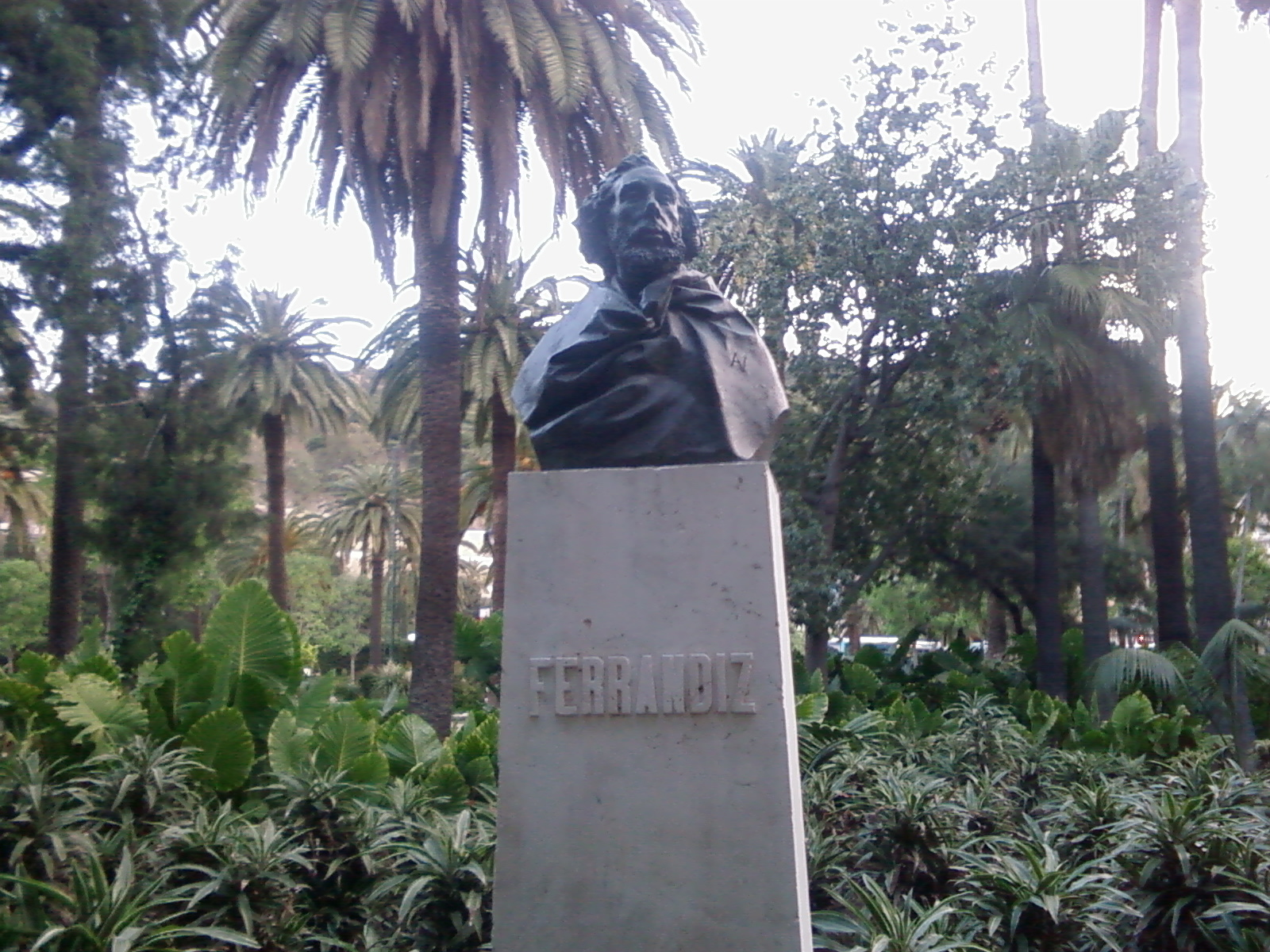
- Monument in Málaga by Agapit Vallmitjana i Barbany
- Born: 22 July 1835; El Cabanyal, Valencia, Spain
- Died: 2 May 1885 (aged 49); Málaga, Kingdom of Spain
- Education: Real Academia de Bellas Artes de San Carlos de Valencia
- Known for: painting

Bernardo Ferrándiz Bádenes (21 July 1835 – 3 May 1885) was a Spanish costumbrista painter. He is considered to be one of the founders of the "Escuela Malagueña".

== Biography ==
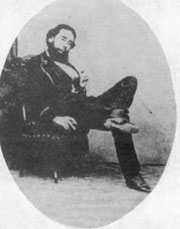
Undated photograph (1860s?)

He was born in Valencia, the son of a fisherman in the port district known as "El Cabanyal". His artistic education began at the Real Academia de Bellas Artes de San Carlos with Francisco Martínez Yago. He later spent some time at the Real Academia de Bellas Artes de San Fernando with Federico de Madrazo and showed an early preference for genre scenes from everyday life.

His painting, "The Viaticum", which portrayed a dying beggar, won him a stipend from the Diputación de Valencia which enabled him to continue his studies abroad. In 1859, he went to Paris, where he took classes at the École des Beaux-Arts and exhibited at the Salon. He would make Paris his home base until 1868.

He travelled throughout North Africa and Italy and participated in numerous expositions, obtaining honorable mention at the National Exhibition of Fine Arts in 1860. He was awarded second place there in 1864 and a silver medal in 1866.

In 1868, he was married and went to Málaga, where he had been given the Chair of Color and Composition at the Escuela de Bella Artes de San Telmo, despite some strong opposition. Ten years later, he was named the school's Director. Among his notable students there were José Moreno Carbonero, Enrique Simonet and José Denis Belgrano. Because of his Republican sympathies, he was forced to leave Spain during the Third Carlist War and live in Rome until 1876.

His works are widely dispersed throughout Western Europe, although thirteen paintings are preserved at the Museo de Málaga. One of his best known canvases portrays a meeting of the Water Tribunal of the plain of Valencia shortly after its creation. It was bought by Napoleon III and is currently on display at the Musée des Beaux-Arts de Bordeaux. In addition to his paintings, he decorated the ceiling at the Teatro Cervantes.

He died, aged 59, in Málaga. A monument to him has been installed in the Parque de Malaga. It was designed by the sculptor Agapit Vallmitjana, who died before its dedication in 1913.

== Selected paintings ==
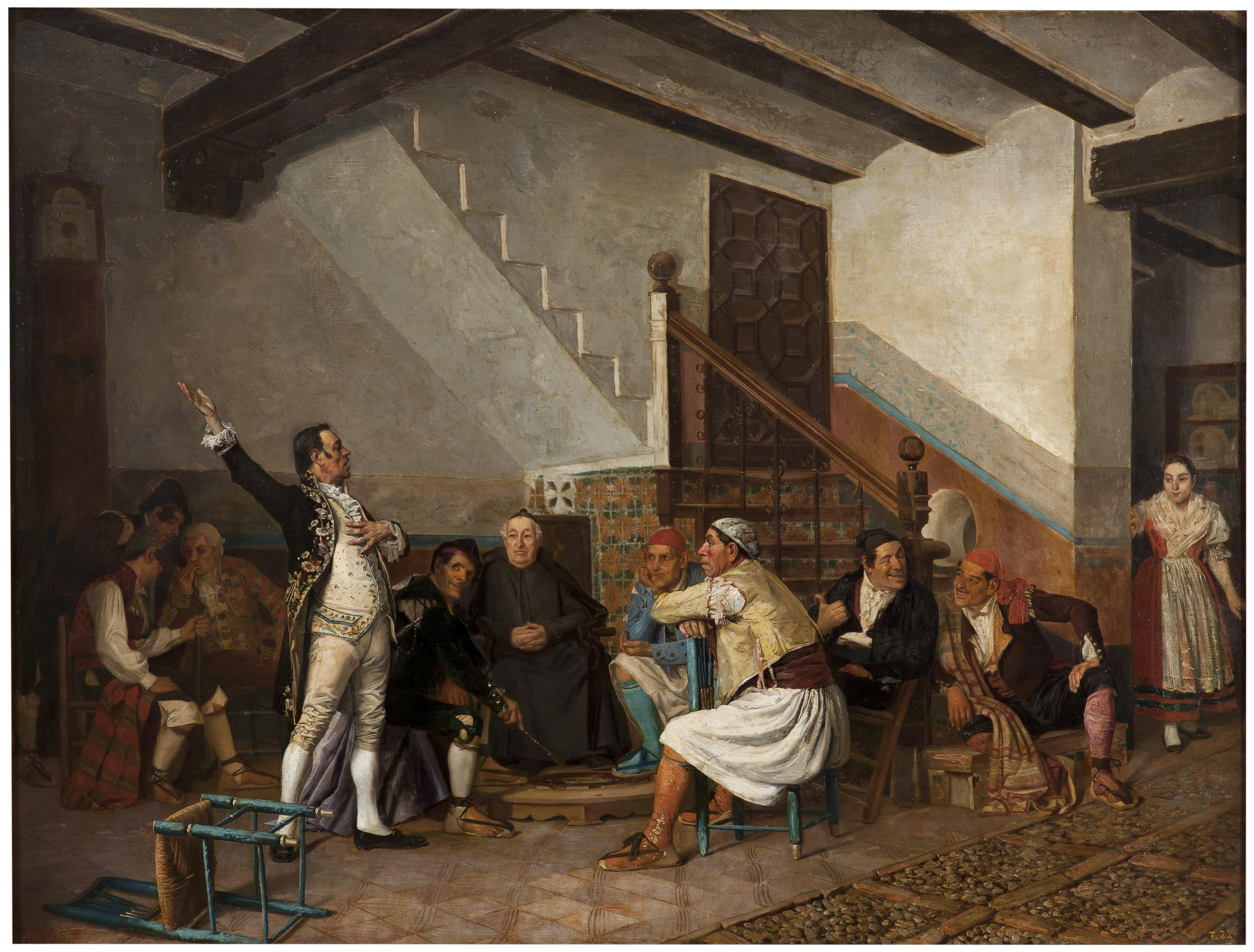
The Political Windbag

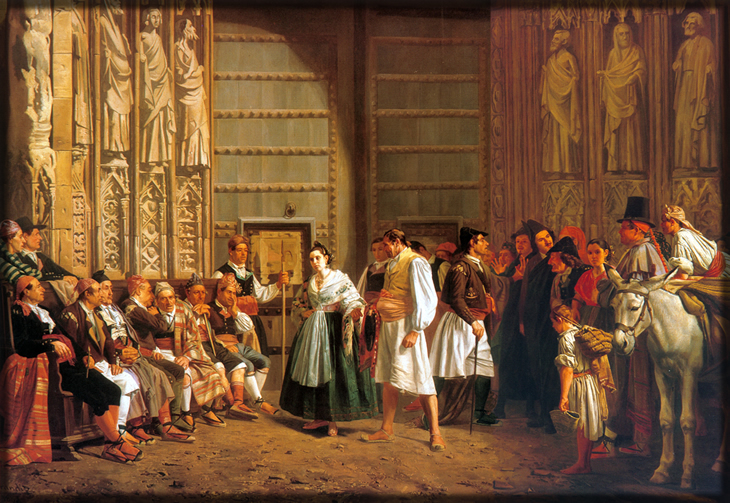
Tribunal of the Waters

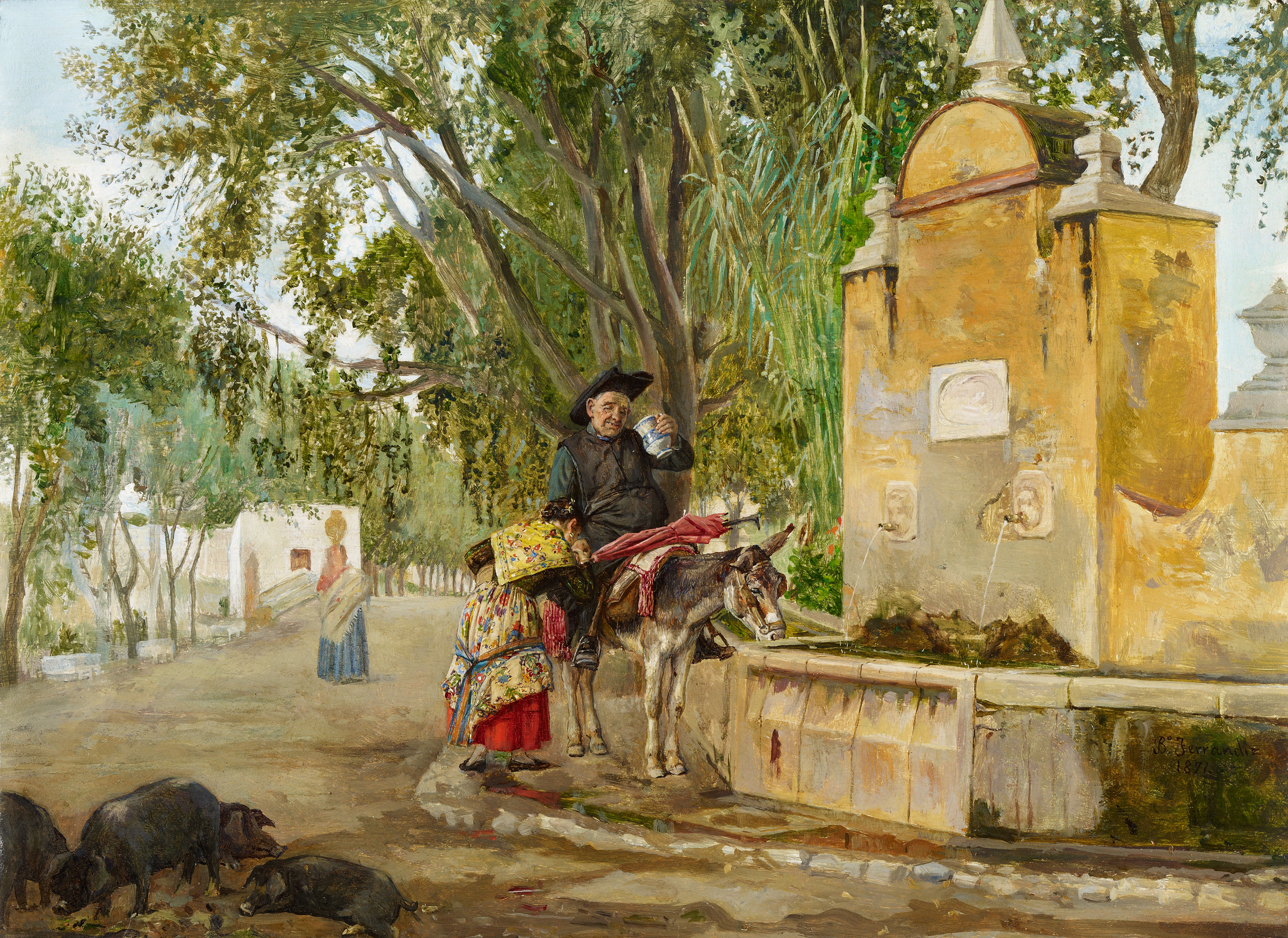
The Priest
