= List of ballets choreographed by Frederick Ashton =

The following is a list, by decade, of ballets created by the English choreographer Frederick Ashton.

== 1920s ==
- A Tragedy of Fashion (music by Eugene Goossens, arranged by Ernest Irving) (1926)
- Various dances for a Purcell Opera Society production of The Fairy-Queen: (music by Henry Purcell) (1927)
- Pas de deux (music by Fritz Kreisler) (1927)
- Suite de danses (music by Wolfgang Amadeus Mozart) (1927)
- Nymphs and Shepherds (music by Wolfgang Amadeus Mozart) (1928)
- Leda (music by Christoph Willibald Gluck) (1928)
- Various dances for Jew Süss (incidental music arranged by Constant Lambert) (1929)

== 1930s ==
- Capriol Suite (music by Peter Warlock) (1930)
- Pomona (music by Constant Lambert) (1930)
- Regatta (music by Gavin Gordon) (1931)
- La Péri (music by Léo Delibes) (1931)
- Façade (music by William Walton) (1931)
- The Lady of Shalott (music by Jean Sibelius) (1931)
- Foyer de danse (music by Lord Berners) (1932)
- Les Masques (music by Francis Poulenc) (1933)
- Les Rendezvous (music by Daniel Auber, arranged by Constant Lambert) (1933)
- Pavane pour une enfante défunte (music by Maurice Ravel) (1933)
- Mephisto Valse (music by Franz Liszt) (1934)
- Le Baisier de la fée (music by Igor Stravinsky) (1935)
- Apparitions (music by Franz Liszt, arranged by Constant Lambert and orchestrated by Gordon Jacob) (1936)
- Nocturne (music by Frederick Delius) (1936)
- Les Patineurs (music by Giacomo Meyerbeer, arranged by Constant Lambert) (1937 )
- A Wedding Bouquet (music by Lord Berners) (1937)
- Horoscope (music by Constant Lambert) (1938)
- The Judgement of Paris (music by Lennox Berkeley) (1938)
- Cupid and Psyche (music by Lord Berners) (1939)

== 1940s ==
- Dante Sonata (music by Franz Liszt, orchestrated by Constant Lambert) (1940)
- The Wise Virgins (music by J S Bach, orchestrated by William Walton), (1940)
- The Wanderer (music by Franz Schubert) (1941)
- The Quest (music by William Walton) (1943)
- Symphonic Variations (music by César Franck) (1946)
- Les Sirènes (music by Lord Berners, orchestrated by Roy Douglas) (1946)
- various dances for a Royal Opera production of The Fairy-Queen (music by Henry Purcell, arranged by Constant Lambert) (1946)
- Valses nobles et sentimentales (music by Maurice Ravel) (1947)
- Scènes de ballet (music by Igor Stravinsky) (1948)
- Don Juan (music by Richard Strauss) (1948)
- Cinderella (music by Sergei Prokofiev) (1948)
- Le Rêve de Léonor (music by Benjamin Britten, orchestrated by Arthur Oldham) (1949)

== 1950s ==
- Illuminations (music by Benjamin Britten) (1950)
- Daphnis et Chloé (music by Maurice Ravel) (1951), created for Margot Fonteyn and Michael Somes
- Tiresias (music by Constant Lambert) (1951)
- Sylvia (music by Léo Delibes) (1952)
- Picnic at Tintagel (music by Arnold Bax) (1952)
- Homage to the Queen (music by Malcolm Arnold) (1953)
- Madame Chrysanthème (music by Alan Rawsthorne) (1955)
- Romeo and Juliet (music by Sergei Prokofiev) (1955)
- Rinaldo and Armida (music by Malcolm Arnold) (1955)
- La Péri (music by Paul Dukas) (1956)
- Birthday Offering (music by Alexander Glazunov, arranged by Robert Irving) (1956)
- Ondine (music by Hans Werner Henze) (1958), created for Dame Margot Fonteyn
- La Valse (music by Maurice Ravel) (1958)

== 1960s ==
- La fille mal gardée (music by Ferdinand Hérold - John Lanchbery (1960)
- Persephone (music by Igor Stravinsky) (1961)
- The Two Pigeons (music by André Messager, arranged by John Lanchbery) (1961)
- Marguerite and Armand (music by Franz Liszt, orchestrated by Humphrey Searle) 1963). Soloists: Margot Fonteyn and Rudolf Nureyev
- The Dream after Shakespeare's A Midsummer Night's Dream (music by Felix Mendelssohn, some music arranged by John Lanchbery) (1964)
- Monotones (music by Erik Satie, orchestrated by Claude Debussy) (1965)
- Jazz Calendar (music by Richard Rodney Bennett) (1968)
- Enigma Variations (music by Edward Elgar) (1968)

== 1970s ==
- Die Geschöpfe des Prometheus (The Creatures of Prometheus) (music by Ludwig van Beethoven) (1970)
- Lament of the Waves (music by Gérard Masson) (1970)
- The Walk to the Paradise Garden (music by Frederick Delius) (1972)
- Five Brahms Waltzes in the Manner of Isadora Duncan (music by Johannes Brahms) (1976) (expanded from Brahms Waltz, 1975)
- A Month in the Country (music by Frédéric Chopin, arranged by John Lanchbery) (1976)
- Voices of Spring (music by Johann Strauss II) (1977)

== 1980s ==
- Rhapsody (music by Sergei Rachmaninoff) (1980)
- Pas de légumes (music by Gioachino Rossini) (1982)
- La chatte métamorphosée en femme (music by Jacques Offenbach) (1985)
