= Voices of Spring (disambiguation) =

"Voices of Spring" is an orchestral waltz by Johann Strauss II.

Voices of Spring may also refer to:

- Voices of Spring (Ashton), a ballet by Frederick Ashton
- Voices of Spring (1933 film), an Austrian film directed by Paul Fejos
- Voices of Spring (1947 film), a Mexican film directed by Jaime Salvador
- Voices of Spring (1952 film), an Austrian film directed by Hans Thimig
