= Sophie Fedorovitch =

- Born: 3 December 1893; Minsk, Russian Empire (now Belarus)
- Died: 25 January 1953 (aged 59); London, UK
- Occupations: Ballet, opera and theatre designer
- Years active: 1926–1953

Sophie Fedorovitch (Belarusian: Сафія Федаровіч; 3 December 1893 – 25 January 1953) was a Russian-born theatrical designer who worked with ballet choreographer Sir Frederick Ashton from his first choreographed ballet in 1926 until her accidental death in 1953.

Fedorovitch designed for several British choreographers including Ninette de Valois and Antony Tudor, as well as for opera and theatre. From 1951 until her death in 1953, she was a member of the artistic advisory panel of Sadler's Wells Ballet, a role she had unofficially undertaken for many years.

In her 2012 article in Research in Dance Education, Elizabeth McLean's view was that Fedorovitch had a "formative influence" on British ballet design of the 1930s and 1940s, and that she should be considered the equal of her contemporary, Christian Bérard.

== Early life ==
Fedorovitch was born and raised in Minsk, Russian Empire (now Belarus) and studied painting in Kraków, Moscow, and St Petersburg. She migrated from Russia to England in 1920. She was established as a painter until she met Ashton, after which she increasingly came to devote her career to set and costume design.

== Career ==
Ashton and Fedorovitch met in 1925, introduced by Marie Rambert, who had met her in 1921. They worked together from A Tragedy of Fashion, Ashton's first ballet in 1926. Costumes and scenery were by Fedorovitch, who continued to work with Ashton for more than twenty years, and became, in his words, "not only my dearest friend but my greatest artistic collaborator and adviser". As a friend and collaborator, she did most of her early works for Ashton. Altogether, they collaborated on eleven works.

In 1940, Fedorovitch did stage design and "simple but gorgeous costumes" for choreographer Andrée Howard's best known work La fête étrange, for London Ballet, based on an episode in Alain Fournier's novel Le Grand Meaulnes. It has been performed over 200 times by The Royal Ballet, and by Scottish Ballet.

Her confidants, in addition to Ashton, included Barbara Ker-Seymer, Olivia Wyndham, Marty Mann and Lucy Norton.

== Death ==
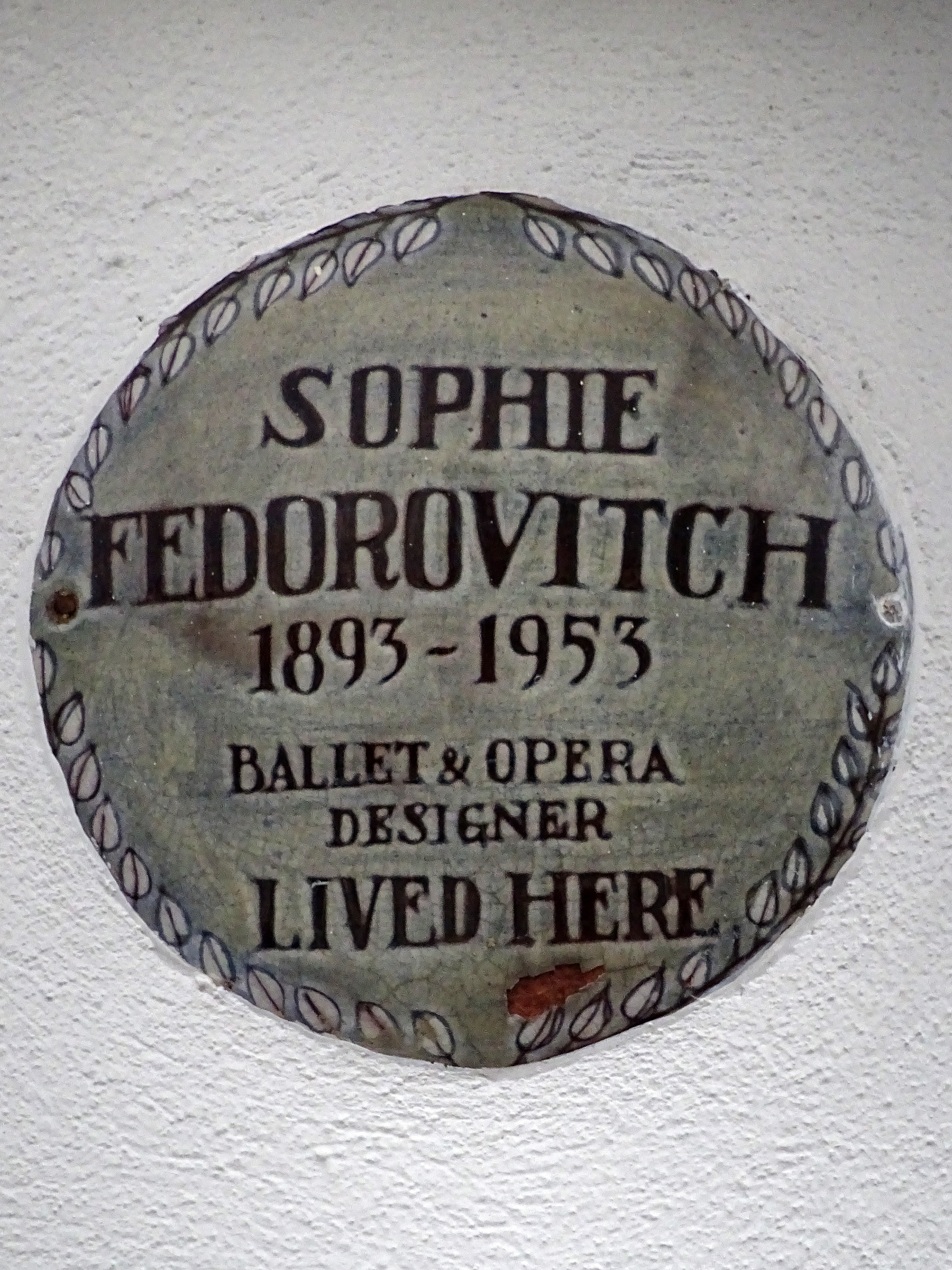
Plaque at 22 Bury Walk

Fedorovitch died as a result of a gas leak at her house at 22 Bury Walk, Chelsea. The house, known as the "Gothic Box", was left to Simon Fleet, later mentor to fellow interior designer Nicky Haslam. A memorial plaque to "Sophie Fedorovitch, costume designer" was subsequently erected there.

Ashton dedicated A Month in the Country to her memory.

== Designs created ==
- 1926: A Tragedy of Fashion, for Frederick Ashton
- 1933 – Les Masques, for Frederick Ashton
- 1934: Mephisto Valse, for Frederick Ashton
- 1935: Le baiser de la fée, for Frederick Ashton
- 1936: Nocturne, for Frederick Ashton
- 1938: Endymion, for Mona Inglesby
- 1938: Horoscope, for Frederick Ashton
- 1940: Dante Sonata, for Frederick Ashton
- 1940: La fête étrange, for Andrée Howard and the London Ballet
- 1946: Symphonic Variations, for Frederick Ashton
- 1948 – La traviata, for Covent Garden Opera (now The Royal Opera)
- 1950 – Madama Butterfly, for Covent Garden Opera (now The Royal Opera)
- 1953: Veneziana, for Andrée Howard and Sadler's Wells Ballet
- 1953: Orfeo ed Euridice, for Covent Garden Opera (now The Royal Opera), with dance choreography by Frederick Ashton
