= Les Masques =

Les Masques, ou Changement de dames is a short ballet of 1933 choreographed by Frederick Ashton to music by Francis Poulenc. Ashton's biographer describes it as a miniature masterpiece, an inspired fusion of scenery, steps and music.

The ballet reflected the social and sexual manners of Ashston's world, and the limited size of the Mercury Theatre obliged Ashton to understate the dancers' gestures and moves. A Personage is seen at a masked ball with his lady friend. They meet another couple, and they turn out to be his wife and her lover. After some changing of partners, at the end the wife and husband are a pair while the lover and mistress are also united.

The black and white costumes (made by Matilda Etches) and scenery (evoking an Arts Club Ball) were by Sophie Fedorovitch, who worked with Ashton on many other ballets during his career, and became, in his words, "not only my dearest friend but my greatest artistic collaborator and adviser". Marie Rambert recalled going to an ironmongers in Shepherd's Bush to buy corrugated iron for the columns in the set; the full cost of the production was £60.

The original cast at the Ballet Club on the 5 March 1933 consisted of Frederick Ashton as A Personage, Alicia Markova as His Lady Friend, Pearl Argyle as His Wife, Walter Gore as Her Lover, Elisabeth Schooling and Betty Cuff as Two Young Girls and Anna Brunton, Elisabeth Ruxton and Tamara Svetlova as Three Ladies with Fans. At the premiere the music was played by Helen Gaskell, Cecil James and Charles Lynch.

Poulenc's Trio for oboe, bassoon and piano was composed in Cannes in 1926, dedicated to Manuel de Falla, and premiered in Paris on 2 May that year. The three movements are marked Presto, Andante and Rondo. When he saw the work, Poulenc was enchanted and in thanks gave Rambert an inscribed copy of his Soirées de Nazelles. After the production left the repertory the choreography was lost and Ashton declined requests to revive the work.

David Vaughan comments that Ashton had wanted Poulenc to compose the score for his first ballet, A Tragedy of Fashion, and seven years on "was fully in command of the resources that could enable him to realise such a work" – witty, sophisticated and of its time. Later projects to collaborate between Ashton and Poulenc did not come to fruition.
