= Symphonic Variations (ballet) =

- Choreographer: Frederick Ashton
- Premiere: 24 April 1946; Royal Opera House, London
- Original ballet company: Sadler's Wells Ballet
- Design: Sophie Fedorovitch

Symphonic Variations is a one-act ballet by Frederick Ashton set to the eponymous music (M. 46) of César Franck. The premiere, performed by the Sadler's Wells Ballet, took place at the Royal Opera House, Covent Garden, on 24 April 1946 in a triple bill; the other works were Ashton's Les Patineurs and Robert Helpmann's Adam Zero. The ballet was conducted by Constant Lambert and the set designed by Sophie Fedorovitch.

== Background ==
During the Second World War, Ashton listened to Franck's Symphonic Variations a great deal and he decided to develop an elaborate scenario to be set to the music. Constant Lambert, music director for the Sadler's Wells Ballet, at first objected to the use of Franck's music for a ballet; Ashton dropped his original scenario and created an abstract ballet. During the war, the repertory had become increasingly literary, and Ashton's purpose was to counteract this. It was not his intention to display ingenuity of invention but to construct a more abstract piece, setting three men and three women dancing on the vast expanse of the Opera House stage uncluttered with scenery and effect.

== Description ==
The critic A V Coton described the ballet:

The curtain rises on a vast stage, and before the deep-set backcloth of sprayed white and green are seen six immobile and minute dancers, clad all in white, with a little black relief here and there. Nothing is stated about place, person, condition or circumstance. ...The disparity between these persons and all the vast area of their action proposes an imagery of infinities. ... In each of these instances a choreographer of assured mastery, moving perhaps to some degree deliberately, and to some extent intuitively, has re-stated the primary function of theatrical dancing by re-shaping in basic material into a new and exciting assemblage of images.

== Casts ==
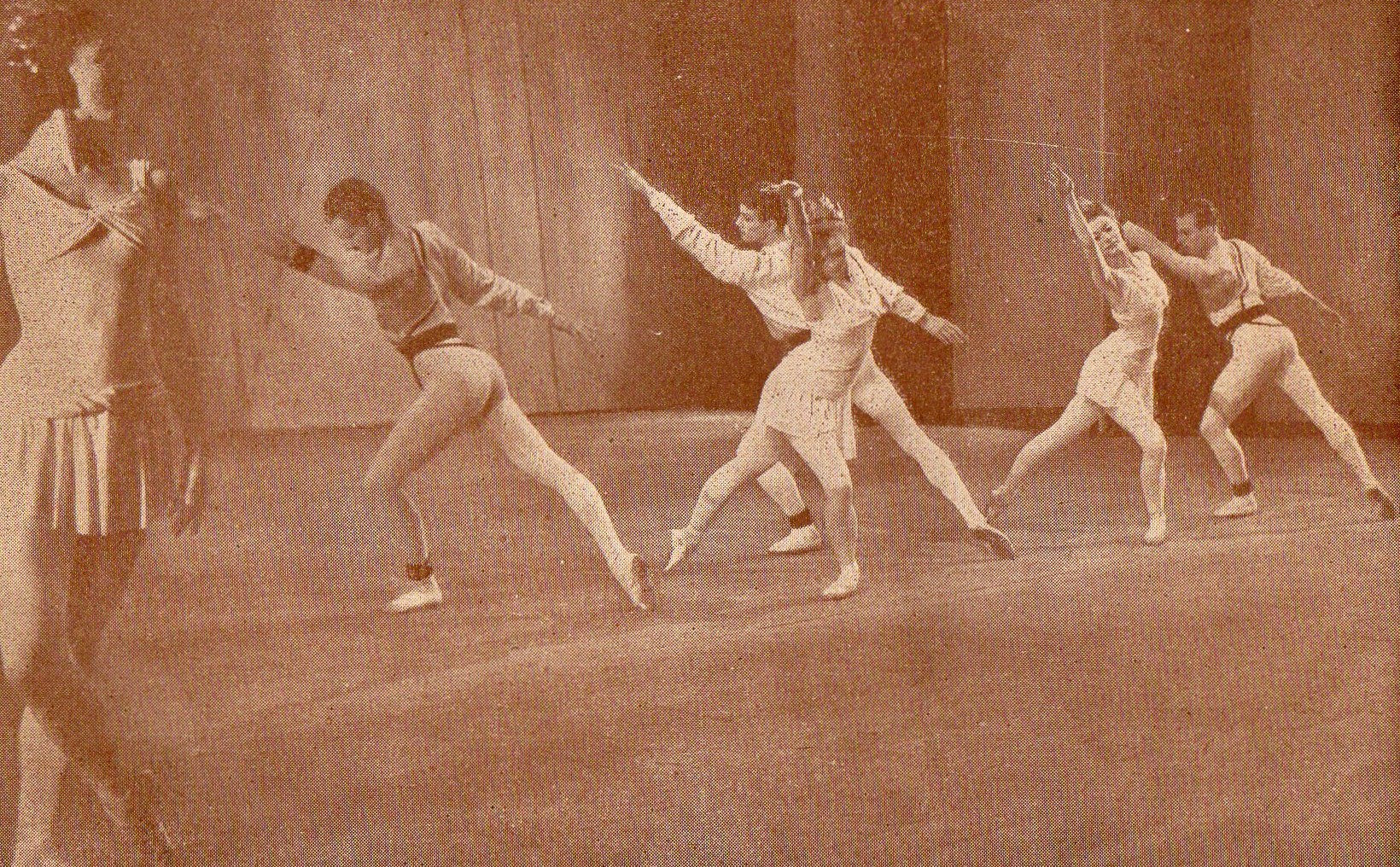
Symphonic Variations. Sadler's Wells Ballet in Poznan, 1947

In the opening season the cast was

- Margot Fonteyn
- Moira Shearer
- Pamela May
- Michael Somes
- Brian Shaw
- Henry Danton

In the following season Shaw and Danton were replaced by John Hart and Alexander Grant. In the first production and early revivals the work was regarded as making such demands on the dancers that they took no part in any other ballet on the same evening's bill. Margaret Dale in conversation with David Vaughan commented, "Even though Symphonic Variations more than any other ballet creates a feeling of serenity, for the dancers, in the beginning it was an 'absolute marathon', and made demands on them that had never been made before. ... It was a test of sheer stamina that very few British dancers could stand at that time."

== Critical reception ==
From the premiere onwards the work has been highly regarded by critics. The Manchester Guardian called the choreography "rare, brave and stimulating", with the reservation that the prominence of the concertante piano part in the score was not mirrored in a similarly prominent part for the prima ballerina. The Observer thought the piece "charming and exciting". The Times said:

Mr. Frederick Ashton has devised a ballet for six dancers without drama and without characterisation – a "pure" ballet, in which the interest is wholly concentrated upon the dance and its relation to the music. That the new ballet holds one's attention from the first motionless tableau until the dancers sink into repose again at the end is a measure of Mr. Ashton's success.

Later critics have regarded the work similarly highly. A V Coton of The Daily Telegraph asserted in 1967 that Symphonic Variations "remains [Ashton's] absolute and indisputable masterpiece – a perfect fusion of ideas about stylised dance, light, space, romantic-lyric music and heroic costume – which creates a spectacle that calls into question the value of almost every other ballet in the modern repertoire". John Percival of The Times remarked of the same production, "Fittingly, the centrepiece of this programme was a revival of Symphonic Variations … as many of us think the best work ever created for this company".

In 2004, Cristina Franchi described it as "A pure classical dance work of great beauty and simplicity."

== Revivals ==
In November 1967, the Royal Ballet staged a revival of three works by Ashton: Symphonic Variations was part of that triple bill with Les Patineurs and Persephone. The dancers in Symphonic Variations were:

- Merle Park
- Ann Jenner
- Jennifer Penny
- Donald MacLeary
- Graham Usher
- Michael Coleman

The work has been toured by the Royal Ballet and Birmingham Royal Ballet companies, with productions in 1970, with Antoinette Sibley and Anthony Dowell in the cast, and 1992, under the direction of Michael Somes. Other companies have staged the work, including the Dutch National Ballet (1989), American Ballet Theatre (1992), the National Ballet of Canada (1996), San Francisco Ballet (2004), and The Australian Ballet (2015). This piece has also been performed by the University of North Carolina School of the Arts (2018), being the only school to have ever performed the work.
