= Fairy Queen (disambiguation) =

The Fairy Queen, in English folklore, traditionally ruled the fairies.

Fairy Queen may also refer to:

== Literature and fine art ==
- The Faerie Queene, a poem by Edmund Spenser published in two parts, in 1590 and 1596
- The Fairy Queen (Fablehaven), a fictional character in Brandon Mull's 2000s Fablehaven series

== Music and opera ==
- The Fairy-Queen, a 1692 semi-opera by Purcell based on Shakespeare's Midsummer Night's Dream
  - The Fairy Queen, a 1946 ballet based on the opera with choreography by Sir Frederick Ashton and music by Henry Purcell
- "Faerie Queen" (song), a song by Heather Alexander from the 1994 album Wanderlust
- "Faerie Queen", a song by Blackmore's Night from the 2006 album The Village Lanterne
- Fairy Queen (1988) and The Fairy Queen (2004), albums by the musical artist Kenny Klein

== Other uses ==
- Fairy Queen (locomotive), a British-built steam locomotive operated by the East Indian Railway Company
- Faerie Queene (mountain), a mountain in New Zealand

== See also ==
- Fairy (disambiguation)
- Queen (disambiguation)
