= Five Brahms Waltzes in the Manner of Isadora Duncan =

Ballet by Frederick Ashton

- Choreographer: Frederick Ashton
- Music: Johannes Brahms
- Premiere: 15 June 1976; Sadler's Wells Theatre
- Created for: Lynn Seymour
- Genre: Neoclassical ballet

Five Brahms Waltzes in the Manner of Isadora Duncan is a ballet solo choreographed by Frederick Ashton to music by Johannes Brahms, inspired by Isadora Duncan and created for Lynn Seymour. The first version, under the title Brahms Waltz, used only Brahms' Op. 39, No. 15, and premiered on 22 June 1975, at the Hamburg State Opera. The expanded version, which featured more Brahms waltzes, premiered on 15 June 1976, during Ballet Rambert's 50th anniversary gala, at the Sadler's Wells Theatre, London, and is dedicated to Marie Rambert.

== Background and production ==
During the Easter holiday in 1921, the 17-year-old Ashton saw a performance of Isadora Duncan at Prince of Wales Theatre, London. Duncan, 44, was in semi-transparent drapes and had badly dyed red hair, though the performance captivated Ashton, and he returned a few more times. One of the dances is set to a Brahms Waltz, with her running forward while strewing rose petals with her hands. He later recalled,

I didn't think I'd like it, but I was completely captivated. I suppose she was rather blowsy about that time – I remember she had red hair – and the first impact gave me a bit of a shock, but that soon passed... She wasn't really the old camp that everyone makes her out now, she was very serious, and an immensely strong personality that came right across the footlights and held the audience and compelled them completely.

In 1975, the Hamburg Ballet was having a gala tribute to Vaslav Nijinsky. At a party, Lynn Seymour, who had worked with Ashton at the Royal Ballet, and John Neumeier, the artistic director of Hamburg Ballet, convinced Ashton to choreograph a solo inspired by Duncan, a major influence of Nijinsky, for the gala. It was the first collaboration between Ashton and Seymour since The Two Pigeons in 1961, as the latter had since worked with Kenneth MacMillan closely. The solo is set to Brahms' Waltz No. 15, which was used in Duncan's petal dance.

In 1976, Ashton expanded the solo, titled Five Brahms Waltzes in the Manner of Isadora Duncan for Ballet Rambert's 50th anniversary gala, with Brahms' Waltzes Nos. 1, 2, 8, 10 and 13, in addition to No. 15, with No. 1 used as a prelude before the dancer enters. Marie Rambert, who idolised Duncan, watched the solo before the official premiere, and reacted positively to the solo, "that's exactly what I remember." Five Brahms Waltzes is dedicated to Rambert.

Ashton chose to be inspired by the Duncan performances he saw, rather than recreate her choreography, though he replicated some of Duncan's choreography, including the petal dance at the beginning of the solo. He described, "[Seymour] had her hands full of petals and as she runs forward the petals streamed behind her." He brought photos of Duncan taken by Arnold Genthe, watercolour paintings by André Dunoyer de Segonzac and Abraham Walkowitz, and a programme from a Duncan performance he had kept to rehearsals. According to Seymour, Ashton drew a peachy-pink line on the programme, as a reminder of the colour of Duncan's costume. The costume of the ballet included a red wig and transparent pink chiffon dress, similar to what Duncan wore.

== Performances ==
The first version of the solo, Brahms Waltz, premiered on 22 June 1975, at the Hamburg State Opera. The expanded version, Five Brahms Waltzes in the Manner of Isadora Duncan, premiered on 15 June 1976, at Sadler's Wells Theatre, London, during Ballet Rambert's 50th anniversary gala. It has since been revived by Rambert Dance Company, the Royal Ballet, Birmingham Royal Ballet, American Ballet Theatre, Joffrey Ballet and National Ballet of Canada. Seymour staged some of the productions.

== Videography ==
In 1977, Seymour's performance of Five Brahms Waltzes was broadcast on PBS's Dance in America: Trailblazers of Modern Dance.
