= Samodurov =

Samodurov is a surname. Notable people with the surname include:

- Alexandros Samodurov (born 2005), Greek basketball player
- Yuri Samodurov, Russian civil activist, publicist
- Viacheslav Samodurov
