= Wayne Eagling =

Canadian ballet dancer, now retired

Wayne Eagling (born 27 November 1950) is a Canadian ballet dancer, now retired. After more than twenty years as a popular member of The Royal Ballet in London, he became well known as an international choreographer and company director.

== Early life and education ==
Wayne John Eagling was born in Montreal, Quebec, to Anglophone parents, Edward and Thelma Eagling, on 27 November 1950.

He spent much of his childhood and youth in California, where his family had moved. As a boy, he augmented his academic studies by attending classes at the Patricia Ramsey Studio of Dance Arts. There, he developed into a gifted student of classical ballet and, as he matured, was encouraged by his teachers to pursue a career as a professional dancer. In 1965, when he was 15, he was noticed by Michael Somes and Gerd Larsen of the Royal Ballet during the company's tour of the United States and was offered a place at the Royal Ballet School in London.

He moved to England in the late 1960s, where he remained a devoted student of classical ballet and related arts. He was invited to join The Royal Ballet in 1969, when he was only 18.

== Career ==
Eagling proved to be a valuable addition to the company. A supple and powerful dancer, he was promoted to soloist in 1972 and to principal dancer in 1975. As the product of "an eclectic training with a mix of lots of different methods," he was exceptionally versatile. He performed the leading roles of princes, gallants, and swains in the nineteenth-century classics—partnering with dancers including Margot Fonteyn, Jennifer Penney, and Merle Park—but he was best known for his work in the twentieth-century repertory. A favorite of renowned British choreographer Kenneth MacMillan, he created roles in a number of his works, including Elite Syncopations, a suite of ragtime dances, and Gloria, an elegiac work about the futility of war. He danced the role of Crown Prince Rudolf in the New York premiere of MacMillan's Mayerling in April 1983. He also danced in ballets by Frederick Ashton, George Balanchine, Jerome Robbins, and Rudolf Nureyev, among others. He was especially admired as Balanchine's Apollo, as Woyzeck in MacMillan's Different Drummer, and as the Chosen One in Glen Tetley's The Rite of Spring, the first male dancer to undertake that dramatic role. While still active as a principal dancer, Eagling began to take part in choreographic workshops sponsored by the Royal Ballet. His first work for the company was Frankenstein, the Modern Prometheus, made in 1984. Other works soon followed, mounted for his home company and for companies abroad.

In 1991, Eagling took up the post of artistic director of Het Nationale Ballet (Dutch National Ballet) in Amsterdam. As chief choreographer, he created a spate of new works in the following years. In 1996, he collaborated with Toer van Schayk on a new production of The Nutcracker and the Mouse King. Set in Amsterdam around 1810, with skaters on a frozen canal and Saint Nicholas instead of Herr Drosselmeyer, it was an immediate hit with the Dutch public and was later staged by the Finnish National Ballet and the Polish National Ballet. During Eagling's tenure as artistic director, he not only maintained the classical and neoclassical repertory of the Dutch National Ballet but actively commissioned new works by contemporary choreographers such as Ashley Page and David Dawson. After he left his post in Holland in 2003, he worked on the international scene for two years, occasionally staging works for the legendary Italian ballerina Carla Fracci.

In December 2005, Eagling was appointed artistic director of the English National Ballet in London, where he continued to invent new stage works. Notable among them were the witty Men Y Men, set for nine male dancers in 2009, and, in 2010, yet another version of The Nutcracker, a perennial favorite. During his seven years with this company, he was warmly appreciated by audiences and was both respected and beloved by his dancers. In 2012, however, he was forced to resign in a controversial dispute with the governing board over drastic cuts to the company budget.

== Roles created ==
Eagling created numerous roles in the works of Sir Kenneth MacMillan and other choreographers. Among them are the following.

=== In MacMillan ballets ===
- 1972. Triad, music by Serge Prokofiev. Role: Younger Brother, with Anthony Dowell as the Elder Brother and Antoinette Sibley as their love interest.
- 1974. Elite Syncopations, music by Scott Joplin.
- 1975. The Four Seasons, music by Giuseppe Verdi. Role: "Spring," a pas de quatre with Lesley Collier, Michael Coleman, and David Ashmole.
- 1975. Rituals, music by Béla Bartok. Role: Celebrant.
- 1977. Gloriana, music by Benjamin Britten. Role: principal dancer.
- 1980. Gloria, music by Francis Poulenc. Role: Soldier.
- 1984. Different Drummer, music by Anton Webern. Role: Woyzeck.

=== In other works ===
- 1975. Four Schumann Pieces, choreographed by Hans van Manen, music by Robert Schumann.
- 1982. The Tempest, choreographed by Rudolf Nureyev, music by Pyotr Ilyich Tchaikovsky. Role: Ariel.
- 1983. Voices of Spring, choreography by Sir Frederick Ashton, music by Johann Strauss II. Role: featured dancer, a pas de deux with Merle Park.
- 1983. Consort Lessons, choreographed by David Bintley, music by Igor Stravinsky.

== Works choreographed ==
Among the works choreographed by Eagling for various companies are the following:

- 1985. Frankenstein, the Modern Prometheus, music by Vangelis; for The Royal Ballet, London.
- 1986. Beauty and the Beast, music by Vangelis; for the Royal Ballet.
- 1988. Byron, music by Pytor Ilyich Tchaikovsky; for the Ballet del Teatro alla Scala, Milan (La Scala Ballet).
- 1989. Nijinsky, music by Claude Debussy; for the Ballet del Teatro di San Carlo, Naples (Naples Ballet).
- 1993. The Ruins of Time, music by Pyotr Ilyich Tchaikovsky; for Het Nationale Ballet (Dutch National Ballet), Amsterdam. A tribute to Rudolf Nureyev.
- 1994. Symphony in Waves, music by Aaron Jay Kernis; for the Dutch National Ballet.
- 1994. Alma Mahler, music by Gustav Mahler; for La Scala Ballet. A vehicle for Carla Fracci.
- 1996. Holding a Balance, music by Henry Purcell; for the Dutch National Ballet,
- 1996. Nussknacker und Mousekonig (The Nutcracker and the Mouse King), choreographed with Toer van Schayk; music by Pytor Ilyich Tchaikovsky; for the Dutch National Ballet.
- 1997. The Last Emperor, music by Su Cong; for the Hong Kong Ballet.
- 1999. The Magic Flute, choreographed with Toer van Schayk; music by Riccardo Drigo; for the Dutch National Ballet.
- 2004. Dances in Maria Stuarda, opera by Gaetano Donizetti; for the Ballet del Teatro dell'Opera di Roma (Rome Opera Ballet).
- 2000. Le Sacre du Printemps (The Rite of Spring), music by Igor Stravinsky; for the Dutch National Ballet.
- 2008. Resolution, music by Gustav Mahler; for the Royal Ballet.
- 2005. Dances in Thaïs, opera by Jules Massenet; for the Rome Opera Ballet.
- 2008. Resolution, poems by Friedrich Rückert, music by Gustav Mahler; for the Royal Ballet.
- 2009. Men Y Men, music by Sergei Rachmaninov, orchestrated by Gavin Sutherland; for the English National Ballet, London.
- 2010. The Nutcracker, music by Pytor Ilich Tchaikovsky; for the English National Ballet.
- 2012. Beauty and the Beast, expanded version, music by Vangelis; for the Kremlin Ballet, Moscow.
- 2014. The Sleeping Beauty, music by Pyotr Ilyich Tchaikovsky; for the National Ballet of Japan, Tokyo.

== Legacy ==
Eagling can be seen dancing on three DVDs that are commercially available. In a Royal Ballet performance of MacMillan's Romeo and Juliet, recorded in 1984 and released by Kultur Video in 2005, he is partnered with Alessandra Ferri, an acclaimed interpreter of the role of Juliet. At the end of 1984, the BBC recorded the New Year's Eve gala performance of Johann Strauss's operetta Die Fledermaus at the Royal Opera House, starring Dame Kiri Te Kanawa and Hermann Prey. In the party scene, it featured Ashton's exuberant pas de deux set to the famous waltz "Frülingsstimmen" ("Voices of Spring") and danced with joyous abandon by Eagling and Merle Park. Both these recorded performances show him in the prime of his career. Eagling can also be seen performing the "Four Seasons" ballet from Giuseppe Verdi's opera I vespri siciliani, in a production from the Teatro alla Scala, opposite Carla Fracci to choreography by Micha van Hoecke. The production opened La Scala's season in December 1989.
