= Lynn Seymour =

Canadian-born ballet dancer (1939–2023)

Lynn Seymour CBE
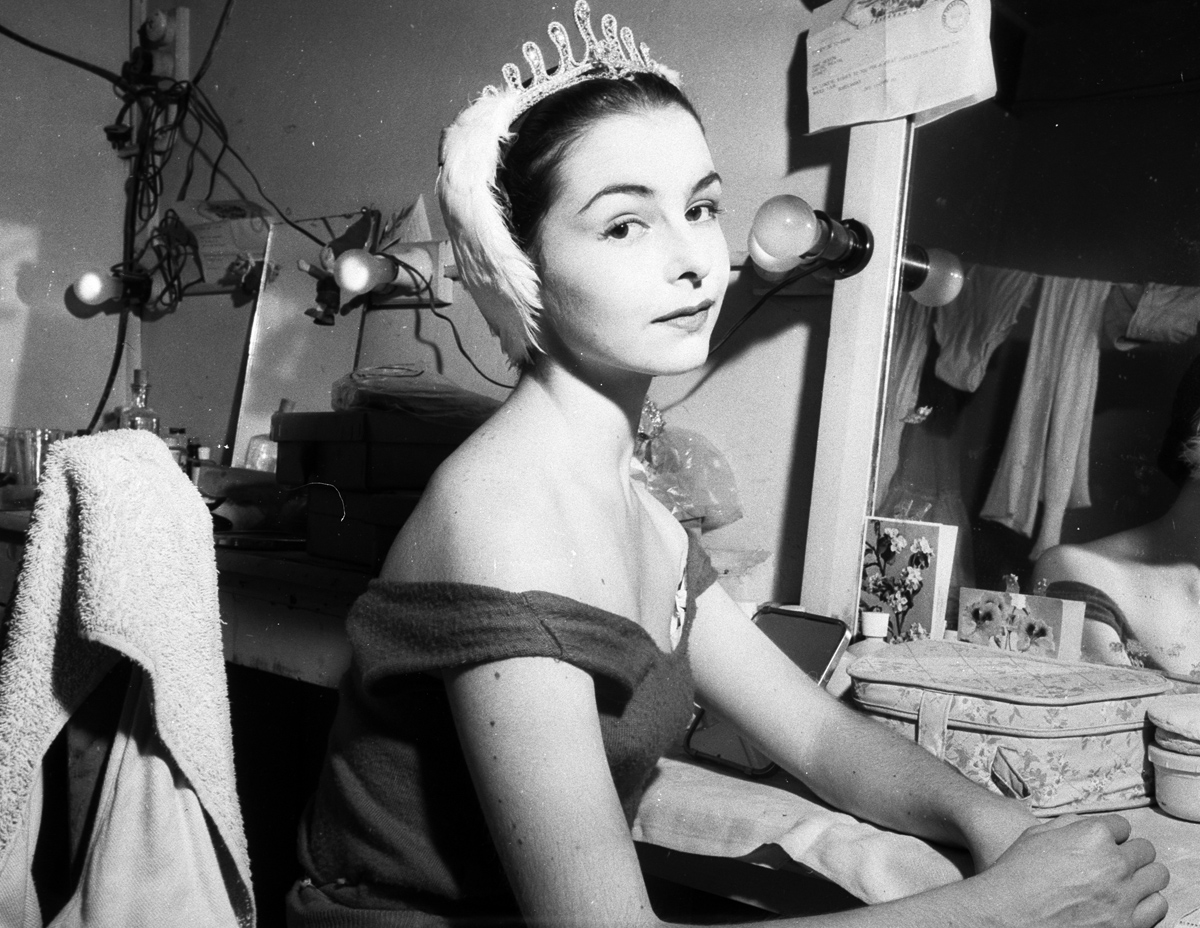
- Seymour dressed for Swan Lake in 1958
- Born: Berta Lynn Springbett; 8 March 1939; Wainwright, Alberta, Canada
- Died: 7 March 2023 (aged 83); London, England
- Education: Sadler's Wells Ballet School
- Occupations: Ballet dancer; choreographer; director
- Employer: The Royal Ballet
- Spouses: Colin Jones (m. 1963; div. 1965) Philip Pace (m. 1979, divorced) Vanya Hackel (m. 1983, divorced)
- Children: 3
- Awards: Order of the British Empire – Commander; 1976

Lynn Seymour CBE (born Berta Lynn Springbett; 8 March 1939 – 7 March 2023) was a Canadian-born ballerina, mostly associated with the Royal Ballet in London. She was a muse of choreographer Kenneth MacMillan, creating lead roles in Romeo and Juliet, The Invitation, Concerto, Anastasia and Mayerling, among others. She originated lead roles for several ballets by Frederick Ashton, including The Two Pigeons, Five Brahms Waltzes in the Manner of Isadora Duncan and A Month in the Country. She also guested with various ballet companies throughout her life.

== Early career ==
Seymour was born in Wainwright, Alberta, as Berta Lynn Springbett, and studied ballet in Vancouver, British Columbia.

In 1953, she was auditioned by Frederick Ashton and given a scholarship to London's Sadler's Wells Ballet School. She joined Covent Garden Opera Ballet in 1956 and moved to the Touring Royal Ballet in 1957. A year later, she joined the main company of the Royal Ballet, becoming a principal dancer in 1959.

Her first created role was the Adolescent in Kenneth MacMillan's study of Anne Frank's diary, The Burrow (1958), which gained her prominence. Her lyrical technique, her unconventional style, and the very intense dramatic powers were developed through a wide range of roles MacMillan started to make on her regularly including The Girl in The Invitation (1960) and The Fiancée in Le baiser de la fée (1960). For Frederick Ashton, she originated the role of the Young Girl in his The Two Pigeons (1961).

== International fame and choreography ==
The title role in MacMillan's Romeo and Juliet, which was created for Seymour in 1965 (although danced by Margot Fonteyn at the première) established her as the leading dance-actress of her generation. Her rebellious and sensual portrayal of the Shakespearean heroine was totally spontaneous and yet influenced by her admiration for Franco Zeffirelli's 1960 Old Vic production of the play with Judi Dench.

Seymour was prima ballerina at the Berlin Opera Ballet (1966–1969) under MacMillan's direction, where she danced the first performance of his Concerto, whose second movement was inspired by her magnetic plasticity, and created the turbulent role of Anna Anderson in the one-act version of Anastasia (1967).

Seymour guested with various companies, including the London Festival Ballet, London Contemporary Dance Theatre, National Ballet of Canada, Alvin Ailey American Dance Theater, and American Ballet Theatre. She worked with different choreographers from John Cranko, Antony Tudor and Jerome Robbins to Glen Tetley, Lar Lubovitch and Roland Petit and was often partnered by her beloved friend Rudolf Nureyev (La Sylphide, Raymonda, Apollo and others). With Nureyev, she improved her classical technique by attending the class of Danish teacher Stanley Williams at the School of American Ballet.

From 1971 to 1978, she returned to the Royal Ballet as a guest artist with new MacMillan dark characters such as the title role in the three-act version of Anastasia (1971) and Mary Vetsera in Mayerling (1978). Ashton created for her a solo called Five Brahms Waltzes in the Manner of Isadora Duncan (1976) and the role of Natalia Petrovna in A Month in the Country (1976, with Anthony Dowell as Beliaev).

Seymour was appointed Commander of the Order of the British Empire (CBE) in the 1976 Birthday Honours and won the Evening Standard Drama Award the following year.

Seymour became a choreographer while still dancing, creating her first ballet Night Ride, with music from Michael Finnissy, for the Royal Ballet Choreographic Group in 1973. She went on to choreograph Gladly, Sadly, Badly, Madly (mus. Carl Davis, 1975) for the London Contemporary Dance Theatre, Wolfie (mus. Mozart, 1987) for the Rambert Dance Company, and The Court of Love (1977), Intimate Letters (1978) and Bastet (mus. Michael Berkeley, 1988) for Sadler's Wells Royal Ballet.

== Directorship and subsequent career ==
From 1978 to 1980, Seymour was artistic director of the Bavarian State Ballet in Munich, where she invited a young William Forsythe to join her. Her time in Munich was marred by injuries and administrative issues. After a period of illness, she briefly returned to the Royal Ballet before retiring in 1981 and worked there subsequently as an occasional coach.

In 1979 film director Karin Altman released Lynn Seymour: In A Class of Her Own, an Anglo-Canadian documentary. In 1980, Richard Austin published an authorised biography and, four years later, Seymour herself wrote an autobiography, Lynn, with Paul Gardner.

Seymour acted in the children's television series The Little Vampire between 1986 and 1987. She also appeared as an actress in the 1987 Herbert Ross film Dancers with Mikhail Baryshnikov and in Wittgenstein by Derek Jarman (1993), playing the part of Ballets Russes's Lydia Lopokova. She created a rock dance called Seymour's Circus and came back to the stage in Gillian Lynne's A Simple Man with Northern Ballet Theatre (1987), in Escape at Sea with Second Stride (1993) and with Adventures in Motion Pictures in Matthew Bourne's Swan Lake (1996) and Cinderella (1997).

In 1989, at the invitation of Peter Schaufuss of the English National Ballet, Seymour came out of retirement to dance for the first time as Tatiana in Cranko's Onegin in London and again the title role of MacMillan's Anastasia that earned her a rapturous ovation in New York.

In 2006–07, Seymour worked in Athens as artistic director of the Greek National Ballet with Irek Mukhamedov as chief répétiteur and Truman Finney as a guest teacher. Named in honour of her, the Lynn Seymour Award for Expressive Dance is annually made at the Royal Ballet School.

== Personal life ==
Seymour married three times and had three children: twin boys Adrian and Jerszy Seymour by Polish dancer Eike Walcz whom she did not marry, and a son by her second husband.

Seymour died in London on 7 March 2023, one day shy of her 84th birthday.
