= A Tragedy of Fashion =

Frederick Ashton's first ballet

A Tragedy of Fashion, or the Scarlet Scissors is a ballet which was first choreographed and performed on 15 June 1926 by Frederick Ashton, who starred with Marie Rambert. The BBC described this debut as "a pivotal moment in the history of ballet," as it launched the careers of both Ashton and Ballet Rambert. The music was by Eugene Goossens, arranged by Ernest Irving.

The ballet was inspired by the tragic suicide of the 17th-century French chef, François Vatel. In 1671, Vatel was responsible for a grand banquet in honour of King Louis XIV and became so upset that the fish delivery was late that he killed himself with a sword. In the ballet, the tale is of a couturier who despairs when his work is not liked and then kills himself with a pair of scissors. The style of the ballet was influenced by the sophisticated productions of Sergei Diaghilev in the 1920s such as Les biches.

It was Ashton's first choreographed work and it was for a 1926 revue staged by Nigel Playfair and Rambert's husband Ashley Dukes. The Observer commented:

an engaging little ballet called 'A Tragedy of Fashion: or The Scarlet Scissors' which Mr. Eugene Goossens has set most suitably to music. Miss Marie Rambert, as an impudently vivacious mannequin, and Mr. Frederick Ashton as a distracted man modist, lead the dancing. It is as chic a trifle as Mr Playfair's modish establishment leads you to expect.

The costumes and scenery were by Sophie Fedorovitch, who continued to work with Ashton for more than twenty years, and became, in his words, "not only my dearest friend but my greatest artistic collaborator and adviser."

In 2004, Ballet Rambert revived it as part of their celebration of Ashton's birth centenary, reinterpreted and restyled by choreographer Ian Spink, following six months of research. The Guardian review gave it four stars and commented "It is a witty and clever achievement but Spink and his superb collaborators have gone one better. They have imbued Tragedy with the quality that made Ashton irresistible – his charm."
