= A Month in the Country (ballet) =

1976 ballet by Frederick Ashton

A Month in the Country is a narrative ballet created in 1976 with choreography by Frederick Ashton, to the music of Frédéric Chopin (three works for piano and orchestra) arranged by John Lanchbery. It is based on the play by Ivan Turgenev of the same name, and lasts for about 40 minutes.

== History ==
Ashton had had the idea of a ballet based on A Month in the Country since seeing the play in the 1930s at the Westminster Theatre, but a meeting with Isaiah Berlin in the late 1960s helped him decide on the subject, and he took up Berlin's suggestion of using the music of Chopin. During the preparation of the ballet, Ashton encouraged the dancers to see the play in London with Dorothy Tutin as Natalia. Ashton also credited Michael Somes "who brought the music used in the ballet to my notice" and Martyn Thomas who helped construct the action of the ballet to correspond with this music.

The ballet was first performed on Thursday, 12 February 1976, by The Royal Ballet at the Royal Opera House, Covent Garden, with Lynn Seymour and Anthony Dowell in the leading roles; later interpreters have included Merle Park and Sylvie Guillem as Natalia and Michael Coleman, Mikhail Baryshnikov, Bruce Sansom and Ivan Putrov as Belaiev. The work was performed by the Royal Ballet every season from 1976 to 1979 and has been regularly revived at Covent Garden.

It has also been seen on tour in New York and Havana. In 1995, Dowell mounted the ballet for the National Ballet of Canada with Karen Kain as Natalia and Robert Conn as Beliaev, the first time it had been performed by any other company.

Peggy Ashcroft – after seeing a performance – told Ashton that she thought his adaptation was better than the original.

== Original cast ==
Role	Dancer
Natalia Petrovna	Lynn Seymour
Yslaev, her husband	Alexander Grant
Kolia, her son	Wayne Sleep
Vera, Natalia's ward	Denise Nunn
Rakitin, Natalia's admirer	Derek Rencher
Katia, a maid	Marguerite Porter
Matvei, a footman	Anthony Conway
Beliaev, Kolia's tutor	Anthony Dowell

== Story ==
The action takes place at Yslaev's country house in 1850.

The story concerns the emotional disturbance caused by the presence of a tutor in the home of a country Russian family. Natalia Petrovna, a bored wife, falls for the young tutor of Kolia, Belaiev. The ballet contains a series of pas de deux (dance of two people) which carry the action forward: Natalia and her admirer Rakitin, followed by Belaiev and Vera, then Natalia's ward, Belaiev and the maid Katia, and finally Belaiev and Natalia. In the finale, Vera summons the household to witness the embraces of Natalia and Belaiev; Rakitin tells Belaiev that both should leave the house. Alone on stage, Natalia despairs at the young man's departure, but he returns unseen and unheard and leaves her the rose she had given him.

== Music ==
The music is by Chopin:

- Variations on "Là ci darem la mano" in B-flat major
- Fantaisie brillante on Polish Airs in A major
- Andante spianato et grande polonaise brillante

Ashton dedicated the work to Sophie Fedorovitch and Bronislava Nijinska "Chopin's compatriots and my mentors".

An audio recording of the ballet score prepared by Lanchbery and conducted by him, with the Orchestra of the Royal Opera House, Covent Garden, and Philip Gammon (piano) was issued on the HMV Greensleeve label in 1977. It was filmed for television in May 1978 (after The Dream), with Seymour and Dowell, and issued on videotape.
