= Frühlingsstimmen =

Orchestral concert waltz by Johann Strauss II

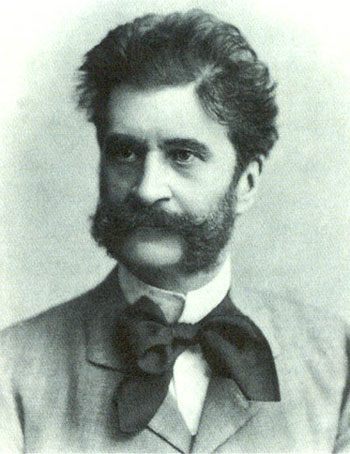
Johann Strauss II

"Frühlingsstimmen", Op. 410 ("Spring's Voices," or commonly "Voices of Spring"; sometimes sung in Italian as "Voci di primavera") is an orchestral waltz, with optional solo soprano voice, written in 1882 by Johann Strauss II.

== History ==
Strauss dedicated the work to the pianist and composer Alfred Grünfeld. The famous coloratura soprano Bertha Schwarz (stage name Bianca Bianchi) sang this concert aria at a grand matinée charity performance at the Theater an der Wien in aid of the "Emperor Franz Joseph and Empress Elisabeth Foundation for Indigent Austro-Hungarian subjects in Leipzig". The waltz was not a great success at its premiere, but was more successful when performed on Strauss' tour of Russia in 1886. A piano arrangement by the composer contributed much to its success beyond Vienna. Grünfeld, the work's dedicatee and a pianist and composer in his own right, also wrote and recorded his own concert transcription of the work for solo piano.

Bianca Bianchi was then a famous member of the Vienna Court Opera Theatre and Strauss was sufficiently inspired to compose a new work, a waltz for solo voice, for the acclaimed singer. The result was his "Frühlingsstimmen" waltz which celebrated spring and remained one of the classical repertoire's most famous waltzes. The piece is sometimes used as an insertion aria in the act 2 ball scene of Strauss' operetta Die Fledermaus.

== Music ==
"Frühlingsstimmen"
Piano version played by Alfred Grünfeld (1852–1924)

The waltz makes a grand entry in the key of B♭ major with loud chords preceded with the waltz's three beats to the bar ushering the first waltz's gentle and swirling melody. The second waltz section, in E♭ major invokes the joys of spring with the flute imitating birdsong and a pastoral scene. The plaintive and dramatic third section in A♭ major and later in C minor probably suggests spring showers whereas the fourth section that follows breaks out from the pensive mood with another cheerful melody in A♭ major. The familiar first waltz melody makes a grand re-entrance, with Coda section, featuring a mocking imitation between the winds, and the strings, before its breathless finish, strong chords and the usual timpani drumroll and warm brass flourish. This is one of the very few Strauss Waltzes that ends, following the cadenza, on a struck quick Major chord. (B♭ major). A performance lasts between seven and nine minutes.

== Instrumentation ==
The piece is scored for flute, piccolo, 2 oboes, 2 clarinets, 2 bassoons, 4 horns, 2 trumpets, 3 trombones, timpani, bass drum, military drum, harp, strings, and optional solo soprano voice.

== Lyrics ==
The lyrics were created by Richard Genée (1823–1895).

Die Lerche in blaue Höh entschwebt,
der Tauwind weht so lau;
sein wonniger milder Hauch belebt
und küßt das Feld, die Au.
Der Frühling in holder Pracht erwacht,
ah alle Pein zu End mag sein,
alles Leid, entflohn ist es weit!
Schmerz wird milder, frohe Bilder,
Glaub an Glück kehrt zuruck;
Sonnenschein, ah dringt nun ein,
ah, alles lacht, ach, ach, erwacht!

Da strömt auch der Liederquell,
der zu lang schon schien zu schweigen;
klingen hört dort wieder rein und hell
süße Stimmen aus den Zweigen!
Ah leis' läßt die Nachtigall
schon die ersten Töne horen,
um die Kön'gin nicht zu stören,
schweigt, ihr Sänger all!
Voller schon klingt bald ihr süßer Ton.
Ach ja bald, ah, ah ja bald!
Ah, ah, ah, ah!

O Sang der Nachtigall, holder Klang, ah ja!
Liebe durchglüht, ah, ah, ah,
tönet das Lied, ah und der Laut,
süß und traut, scheint auch Klagen zu tragen,
ah ah wiegt das Herz in süße Traumerein,
ah, ah, ah, ah, leise ein!
Sehnsucht und Lust
ah ah ah wohnt in der Brust,
ah, wenn ihr Sang lockt so bang,
funkelnd ferne wie Sterne,
ah ah zauberschimmernd wie des Mondes Strahl,
ah ah ah ah wallt durchs Tal!
Kaum will entschwinden die Nacht,
Lerchensang frisch erwacht,
ah, Licht kommt sie kunden,
Schatten entschwinden! ah!

Ah des Frühlings Stimmen klingen traut,
ah ja, ah ja ah o süßer Laut,
ah ah ah ah ach ja!

The lark rises into the blue,
the mellow wind mildly blowing;
his lovely mild breath revives
and kisses the field, the meadow.
Spring in all its splendour rises,
ah all hardship is over,
sorrow becomes milder,
good expectations,
the belief in happiness returns;
sunshine, you warm us,
ah, all is laughing, oh, oh awakes!

A fountain of songs is rising,
who has been silent for too long;
from the brush sounds clear and light
the sweet voice again!
Ah, gently the nightingale lets
stream the first notes,
so as not to disturb the queen;
hush, all you other singers!
More powerful soon chimes her sweet voice.
Oh, soon, oh, oh soon!
Ah........

Oh, song of the nightingale, sweet sound, ah yes!
Glowing with love, ah, ah, ah,
sounds the song, ah and the sound,
sweet and cosy, seems to carry a plaintive note,
ah, ah rocks the heart to sweet dreams,
ah, ah, ah, ah, most gently!
Longing and desire
ah, ah, ah lives in my breast,
ah, if the song anxiously calls for me,
from afar the stars twinkle,
ah, ah in shimmering magic like the moons beam,
ah, ah, ah, ah wavers through the valley!
As haltingly vanishes the night,
the lark starts to sing,
ah, the light she promises,
shadows recede! Ah!

Ah springs voices sound like home,
Ah yes, ah yes oh sweet sound,
Ah, ah, ah, ah, ah yes.

== Frühlingsstimmen in popular culture ==
- "Frühlingsstimmen" is probably best known today from its use by the American slapstick comedy team The Three Stooges in their short films Micro-Phonies and Brideless Groom. In the former short, it is sung by Christine McIntyre. The idea for using it probably came from her, as she had sung it in an earlier 'soundie' sing-a-long short in which she featured. The audience was encouraged to keep quiet when McIntyre was singing the 'Voices of Spring' number.
- Musical films with the name Frühlingsstimmen were made in Austria in 1933 (with music by Oscar Straus) and in 1952 (with music by Alfred Uhl).
- The waltz was choreographed as a ballet by Sir Frederick Ashton, under the name Voices of Spring.
