= Alfred Grünfeld =

Austrian pianist and composer (1852–1924)

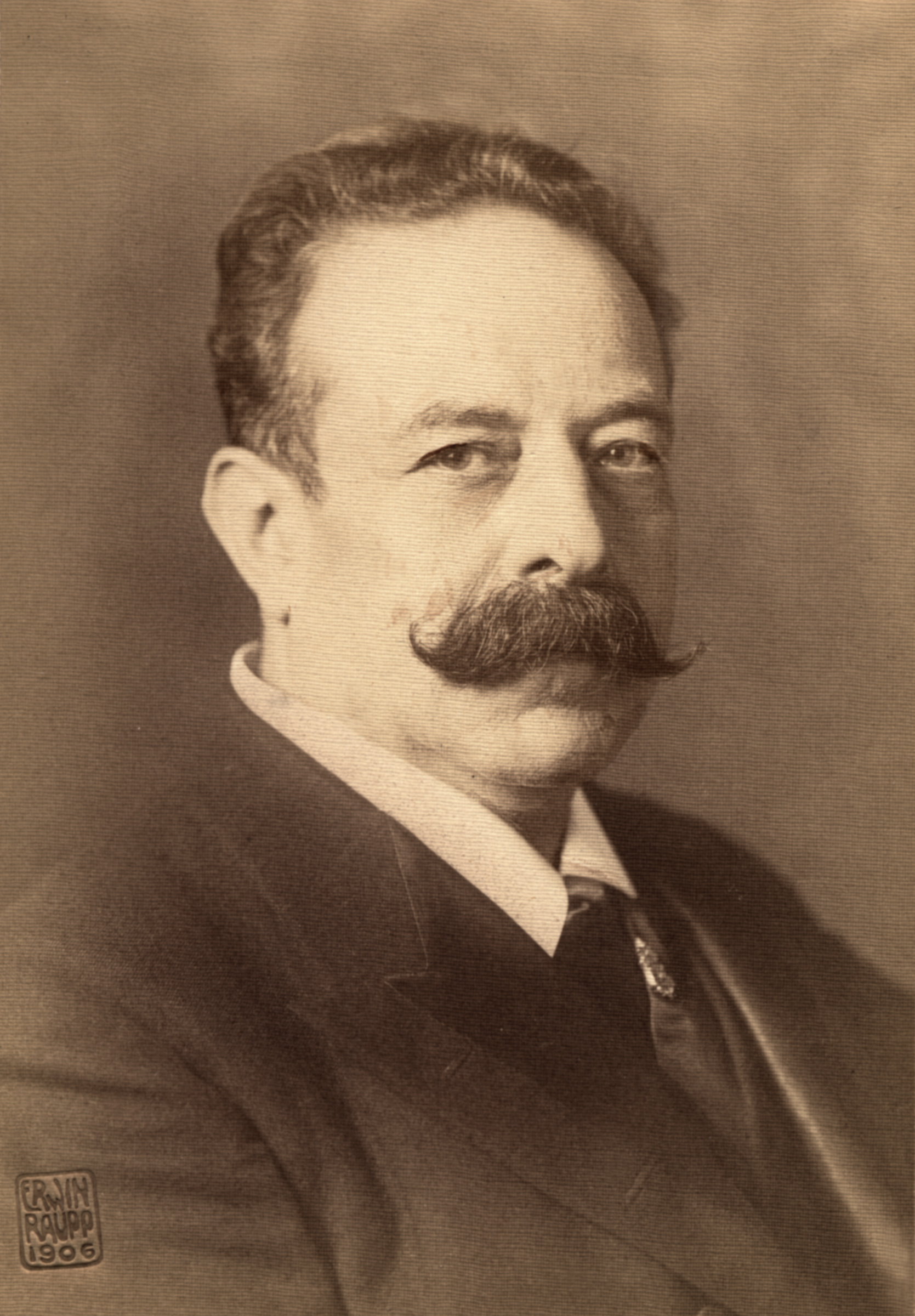
- Alfred Grünfeld 1906.
- Born: 4 July 1852; Prague
- Died: 4 January 1924 (aged 71); Vienna
- Occupations: pianist and composer

Alfred Grünfeld (4 July 1852 in Prague – 4 January 1924 in Vienna) was an Austrian pianist and composer.

Johann Strauss II's walz "Frühlingsstimmen" by Alfred Grünfeld.

== Life ==
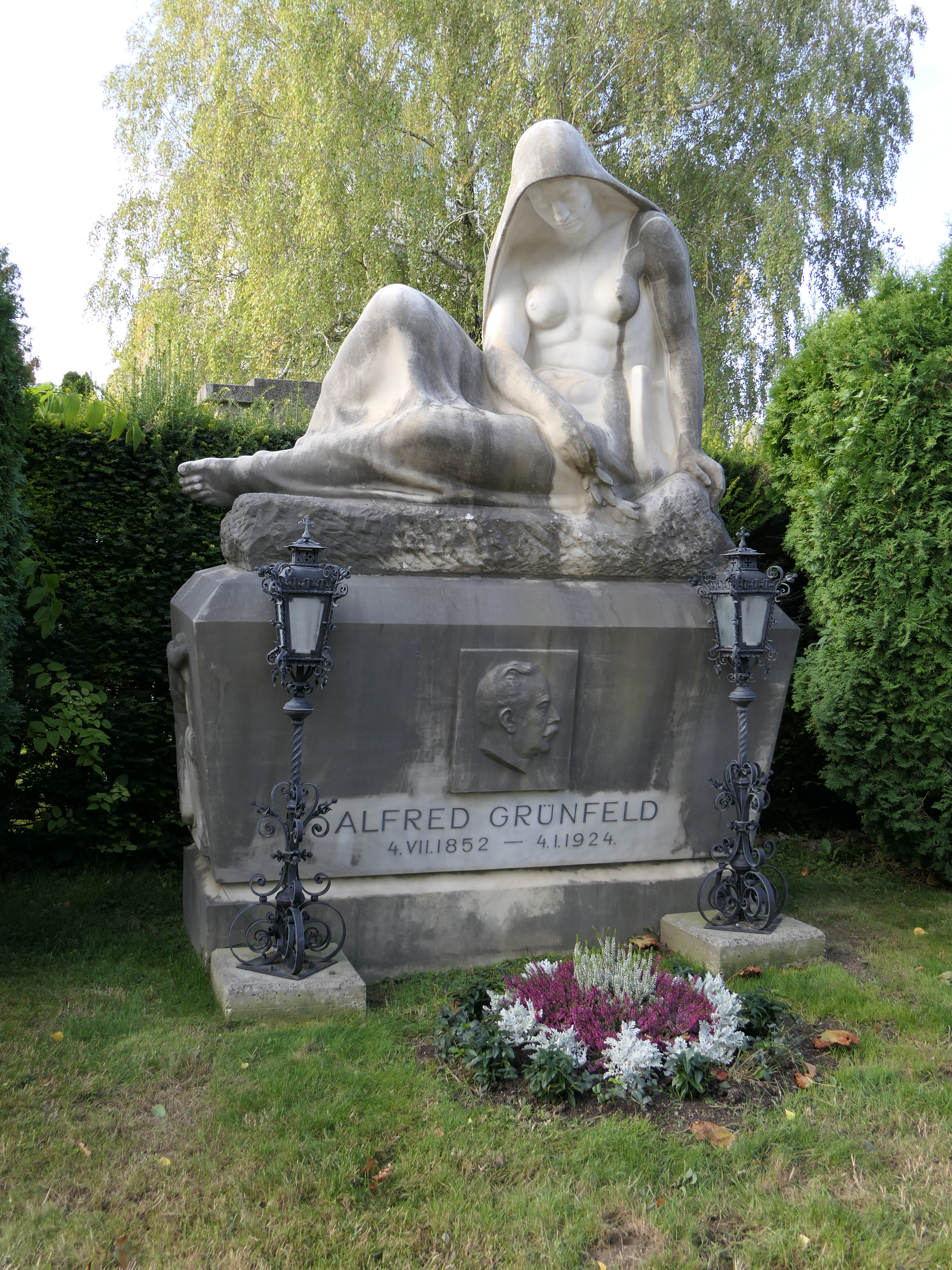
Grave of Alfred Grünfeld and his sister Emma

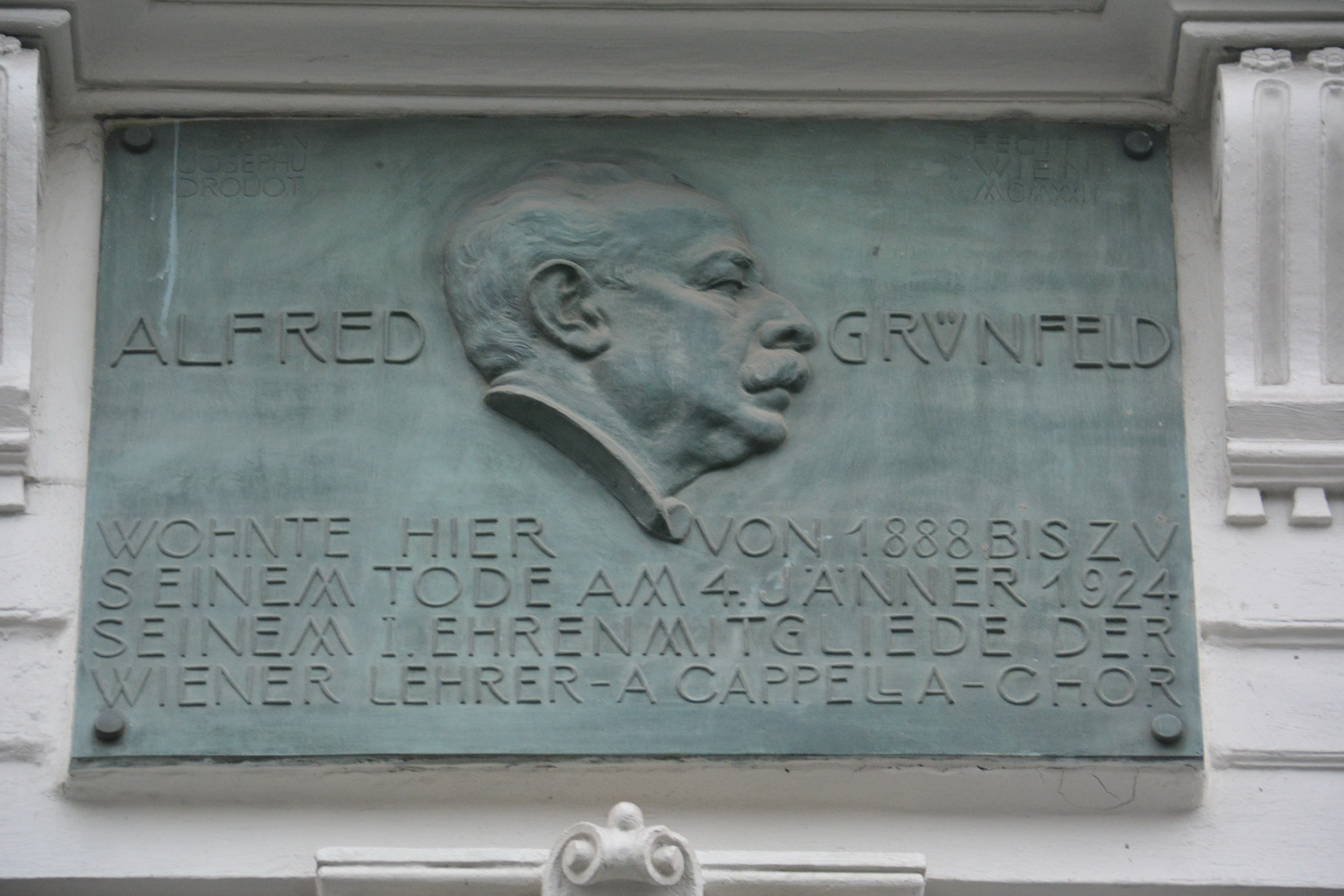
Alfred Grünfeld memorial plaque at Getreidemarkt 10

Alfred Grünfeld was born as the second of eight children to Jewish leather merchant Moritz Grünfeld (born 1817 Kolín nad Labem) and his wife Regina, nee Pick (born 1826 Osek), in Prague – New Town. Moritz Grünfeld was a leather merchant, and Grünfeld grew up in a middle-class, musical Jewish family. His siblings included: the cellist Heinrich Grünfeld; Ludwig Grünfeld, who worked for Deutsche Grammophon, and Siegmund Grünfeld, répétiteur at the Vienna Hofoper. The family lived at Zeltnergasse 38.

Grünfeld displayed musical talent at just four years old, and began his musical education with Julius Theodor Hoeger. He gave his first public concert on 12 April 1865 in the Konviktsaal in Prague. Grünfeld then studied under Josef Krejčí and Bedřich Smetana at the Prague Conservatory, and later at Theodor Kullak's Neue Akademie der Tonkunst in Berlin.

In the winter of 1871, Gustav Mahler was sent by his father to school in Prague, and boarded with the Grünfeld family. This proved to be an unpleasant experience for the eleven-year-old Mahler, and his wife Alma Mahler reported that his "clothes and shoes were taken from him and worn by others and he had to go barefoot and hungry also". She also wrote that he was an "involuntary witness, when he was sitting in a dark room, of a brutal love-scene between the servant and the son of the house, and he never forgot the shock of disgust it caused him. He jumped up to go to the girl's help, but she did not thank him for his pains. He was soundly abused by both of them and sworn to secrecy. This episode left a deep mark. Just as one can be angry all day long with people who have annoyed one in a dream, so Gustav never forgave the young pianist who had given him this shock." Erna Grünfeld, the daughter of Grünfeld's youngest brother, who taught the piano at the Prague Conservatory, said that "the Grünfeld children were real rascals, brimming over with good health: they could make nothing of Gustav, whose terrible shyness only exasperated them."

Grünfeld moved to Vienna in 1873 where he lived, with his sister Emma, for the rest of his life, first at Praterstraße 49 and then at Getreidemarkt 10 from 1888 until his death. The house is now marked with a memorial plaque by the sculptor Florian Josephu-Drouot.

Grünfeld became the most popular salon pianist in Vienna, performing frequently in the salons of Viennese high society as well as the Große Musikvereinssaal, the Große Konzerthaussaal and the Bösendorfersaal. In addition to his solo performance, he often appeared with the Arnold Rosé Quartet and the Hellmesberger Quartet as well as frequently performing and touring with his brother Heinrich Grünfeld. His concert tours took him around Austro-Hungary, to Paris, London, Germany, Scandinavia, Holland, Russia, Poland, Romania, Estonia, Constantinople, Belgrade and the USA. He received many honours and titles for his performances, including: k. k. Kammervirtuose in 1881; Order of Saint Stanislaus 3rd class in 1884; Knight's Cross 2nd class of the Saxe-Ernestine House Order, court pianist to the German crown prince and Officer's Cross of the Romanian Order of the Crown in 1887; Order of the Red Eagle 4th class in 1896; Knight's Cross of the Order of Franz Joseph in 1897; Order of the Lion and the Sun 3rd class and Order of St. Sava 3rd class in 1900; Order of the Medjidie 3rd class in 1901; Officer's Cross of the Order of the Star of Romania in 1902; Prussian Order of the Crown 3rd class and Order of the Iron Crown in 1908; decoration for services to the Austrian Red Cross. He was appointed professor at the Vienna Conservatory in 1897.

Grünfeld was valued not only for his performances but also for his sociable and witty personality, known for his anecdotes and jokes. He was close friends with Johann Strauss, who dedicated his Frühlingsstimmen Waltz to Grünfeld. He became famous for his transcriptions of Strauss waltzes, and particularly of the Frühlingsstimmen which he often played as an encore.

Alfred Grünfeld died on 4 January 1924. He was granted an Ehrengrab in the Zentralfriedhof in Vienna, where he was buried on 7 January. The grave memorial was created by Josef Müllner and unveiled on 23 May 1928.

== Recordings ==
Alfred Grünfeld was the first pianist of note to make commercial recordings. His earliest recording was made in 1889 on wax cylinder for the Edison Phonograph, brought to Europe by Theo Wangemann. On 18 November, Grünfeld recorded his own Kleine Serenade, dances by Brahms and his Ungarische Rhapsodie with a new horn mounted on the underside of the piano. The Ungarische Rhapsodie was discovered in the archives of Thomas Edison and restored in 2012.

Grünfeld recorded 94 discs of classical and romantic piano music - including works by Chopin, Grieg, Poldini, Schumann and Debussy, as well as 50 discs of his own compositions - between 1899 and 1915. He also recorded rolls for the Welte-Mignon reproducing piano and the Phonola player piano between 1905 and 1911.

== Composition ==
As well as performing, Alfred Grünfeld composed around 100 pieces for piano as well as songs and chamber music, which appeared in print between 1872 and 1926. His piano works are mostly in the salon music style, the most famous of which was his Kleine Serenade of 1888. He also composed and performed virtuosic piano pieces - transcriptions and paraphrases - which brought him great success but were mostly not published during his lifetime. Some of these survive only as recordings.

Grünfeld also composed an operetta, Der Lebemann, with a libretto by Ludwig Fischl and Alexander Landesberg, which premiered in 1903 in Vienna, and a comic opera Die Schönen von Fogaras, with libretto by Victor Léon, which was performed in Dresden in 1907. Neither of these works were hugely successful, but some songs and excerpts went on to be well-known, including An mein Wien and the Diner Waltz from Der Lebemann and the Ballett-Intermezzo and Entr'acte from Die Schönen von Fogaras.

Of his works, the following are for the pianoforte:

- Octave-study, Op. 15
- Minuet, Op. 31
- Spanish Serenade, Op. 37
- Tanz-Arabeske, Op. 41
- Romanze, Op. 42
- Ungarische Fantasie: mit Benutzung von Nationalmotiven, Op. 55 (1912)
- Johann Strauss II: Transcriptions & Paraphrases for Solo Piano - Die Fledermaus, Op. 56
- Soirée de Vienne, Konzertparaphrase über Johann Straußsche
- Walzer-Paraphrase about Frühlingsstimmen, Op. 410 by Johann Strauss
- Kaiser-Walzer
