= Mam'zelle Angot =

One-act ballet in three scenes

Mam'zelle Angot is a one-act ballet in three scenes. The choreography and libretto are by Léonide Massine; the music is by Charles Lecocq. The plot is broadly based on Lecocq's 1872 opéra bouffe, La Fille de Madame Angot.

== Background ==
Massine had previously created ballets to scores specially arranged from works by Scarlatti (The Good-Humoured Ladies, 1917), Rossini (La Boutique fantasque, 1919), Johann Strauss (Le Beau Danube, 1933) and Offenbach (Gaîté parisienne, 1938). They were arranged and orchestrated by, respectively, Vincenzo Tommasini, Ottorino Respighi, Roger Désormière and Manuel Rosenthal. Massine's innovation of creating ballets to scores arranged from the music of a single composer was followed by other choreographers including George Balanchine, Frederick Ashton and John Cranko. (Note: Ballets to scores arranged from the works of a single composer were created by Balanchine (The Gods Go a'Begging, 1928, with music by Handel arranged by Sir Thomas Beecham), Ashton (The Wise Virgins, 1940, with Bach's music arranged by William Walton); and Cranko (Pineapple Poll, 1951 and The Lady and the Fool, 1954, with music by Sullivan and Verdi respectively, arranged by Charles Mackerras).) Mam'zelle Angot was Massine's final work in this genre.

== History ==
Massine's first version of the ballet was produced by Ballet Theatre under the title Mademoiselle Angot, at the Metropolitan Opera House, New York, with Nora Kaye in the title role, Massine as the barber, Rosella Hightower as the aristocrat and André Eglevsky as the caricaturist. The music was arranged by Efrem Kurtz and orchestrated by Richard Mohaupt and Gordon Jones.

Massine revived the work for Sadler's Wells Ballet during a visit to London in 1947 (when he also staged and danced in Le Tricorne and La Boutique fantasque), with the title Mam'zelle Angot and a new score, taken mainly from La Fille de Madame Angot, (Note: Jacob imported the melody of Gabrielle's waltz-song "O Paris, gai sejour de plaisir" from Les cent vierges and "Les Portugais sont toujours gais" from Le jour et la nuit.) arranged by Gordon Jacob, designs by André Derain, and a cast that included Margot Fonteyn as Mam'zelle Angot, Alexander Grant as the barber, Moira Shearer as the aristocrat, and Michael Somes as the caricaturist. Australian Ballet took this version into its repertoire in 1971.

Having been performed in most seasons from 1947 to 1959, and toured by the Touring Company in 1968-69, the ballet was revived at Covent Garden in the spring of 1980 in memory of Massine who died the previous year. Other dancers to have appeared with both companies included, as Angot, Julia Farron, Avril Navarre, Nadia Nerina, and Merle Park; Brian Shaw and Ronald Emblen as the barber; John Field, David Blair, Paul Clarke and Christopher Gable as the caricaturist; and Gerd Larsen, Julia Farron, Rosemary Lindsay and Georgia Parkinson as the aristocrat.

== Synopsis ==
=== Scene 1: The market ===
After a short overture the scene opens in a bustling marketplace. Vivacious Mam'zelle Angot, reluctantly engaged to be married to a barber, falls in love with a young caricaturist who introduces himself with a solo in a mazurka rhythm, and at first returns her affections. He has drawn a cartoon mocking a senior government official and his aristocratic mistress, but he now becomes entranced with the aristocrat and forgets his first love. Mam'zelle Angot, jealous, slanders the aristocrat in public realising that her action will cause her arrest, and help her avoid her obligation to marry the barber. A group of unthreatening gendarmes take her away.

=== Scene 2: The house of the aristocrat ===
A reception is in progress. The aristocrat and official dance a gavotte and three ladies a pas de trois. The caricaturist is discovered in the house, fleeing from the soldiers sent to arrest him for his defamatory caricatures. The scene is witnessed by the lovelorn Mam'zelle Angot; she has been sent for by the aristocrat to explain her behaviour, and the meeting reveals that they are old school friends. The unhappy barber, in search of Mam'zelle Angot, is also present. The government official orders the arrest of the caricaturist, who having spent the ball hidden behind a pillar, chooses this moment to declare his love for the aristocrat. They dance a romantic adagio.

=== Scene 3: The carnival ===
Mam'zelle Angot has contrived to bring the aristocrat and the caricaturist face-to-face at the carnival. With the help of her market friends, she exposes the aristocrat to the betrayed government official, who has arrived in disguise. The victims of her scheme are roundly mocked, and Mam'zelle Angot decides after all that it is the barber whom she loves. A pot-pourri of tunes ends the ballet in lively merrymaking.

== Film and recordings ==
The Royal Ballet's staging of the ballet was filmed in 1964, with Merle Park as Mam'zelle Angot, Alexander Grant as the barber, Antoinette Sibley as the aristocrat, and David Blair as the caricaturist.

Suites from both versions of the ballet have been recorded. In 1949 Efrem Kurtz conducted the New York Philharmonic Orchestra in seven numbers from Mademoiselle Angot: I. Overture; II. Waltz; III. March; IV. Polka; V. Gavotte; VI. Grand Waltz; VII. Can-Can. There have been three recordings of selections from Gordon Jacob's arrangements for Mamzelle Angot: by the Royal Philharmonic Orchestra conducted by Robert Irving (1958); the Orchestra of the Royal Opera House, Covent Garden conducted by Anatole Fistoulari (1957); and the National Philharmonic Orchestra conducted by Richard Bonynge (1983). The last of these is the fullest selection, comprising Overture; I. Allegro; II. Allegretto – III. Mazurka; IV. Andantino – Valse; V. Tempo di marcia; VI. Allegro vivace – VII. Allegretto; VIII. Allegro – Gavotte – IX. Allegro – Valse; X. Allegro – Valse – XI. Allegro – XII. Adagio; XIII. Allegro moderato; XIV. Allegro molto – Polka.

== Notes, references and sources ==
=== Sources ===
- Bland, Alexander (1981). The Royal Ballet: The First Fifty Years. London: Threshold Books. ISBN 978-0-90-136611-5.
- Craine, Debra; Judith Mackrell (2010). The Oxford Dictionary of Dance (second ed.). New York: Oxford University Press. ISBN 978-0-19-956344-9.
- Lamb, Andrew (2000). 150 Years of Popular Musical Theatre. New Haven and London: Yale University Press. ISBN 978-0-300-07538-0.
- Searle, Humphrey (1958). Ballet Music: An Introduction. London: Cassell. OCLC 1161464.
