= Voices of Spring (Ashton) =

- Choreographer: Frederick Ashton
- Music: Johann Strauss
- Premiere: 31 December 1977; Royal Opera House, London
- Original ballet company: The Royal Opera

Voices of Spring is a short pas de deux ballet by Sir Frederick Ashton, set to the music of the Frühlingsstimmen waltz by Johann Strauss II. It was originally written to be included as a divertissement in a 1977–78 production of Strauss's operetta Die Fledermaus by the Royal Opera, alongside an adaptation of the Explosions-Polka, and first performed as an independent piece by the Royal Ballet in late 1978.

== Background ==
The Royal Opera performed Die Fledermaus for New Year's Eve 1977; this was the company premiere of the work, produced by Leopold Lindtberg and featuring, among others, Hermann Prey as Eisenstein and Kiri Te Kanawa as Rosalinde. The performance was broadcast live in Britain on BBC 2 and BBC Radio 3, and was relayed to the United States where it was repeated on television later in the day.

The production contained two additional Strauss pieces, choreographed by Ashton as ballets: the Frühlingsstimmen waltz and the Explosions-Polka. These appeared in Act II of the operetta, part of a ball scene. The Explosions-Polka was performed by an ensemble cast, while the Frühlingsstimmen waltz, a pas de deux was performed by Merle Park and Wayne Eagling.

In September 1978, the Frühlingsstimmen waltz dance was premiered as an independent piece, under its English name Voices of Spring, at the Ambassador Auditorium in Los Angeles.

== Description ==
Frühlingsstimmen itself is a short piece with no plot, around eight minutes long. It is a lively Viennese waltz and the dance is suited to the music; it has a strong sense of effortless and joyful movement, strongly influenced by the boldness of the Bolshoi Ballet.

It is performed by one male and one female dancer, neither named and both simply identified as "Dancer".

== Critical reception ==
Reviews of the first performance did not focus on the dance, but the Times described it as "danced admirably and a great improvement on the Explosions-Polka". The 1980s independent performances were likewise not heavily remarked upon. In the 2004 revival, the Guardian noted that while not the centrepiece of the performance, Voices was "the kind of crowd-rousing display that suits programmes of highlights".

== Revivals ==
The piece is rarely performed, but was revived for performance by the Royal Ballet in 1981 and 1983, when it was again performed by Eagling and Park, then in 2004 and 2012. In 1981, it was part of a programme of varied works and replaced a performance of the pas de deux from Sylvia, which Ashton had decided should not be performed out of the context of the main ballet. The 2004 performance at the Royal Opera House was part of a series of Ashton works performed to mark his centenary, danced by Mara Galeazzi and Viacheslav Samodurov, and was coached in part by Merle Park. The Royal Ballet also marked the centenary with performances at the Metropolitan Opera House in New York in July, and in England later in the year, danced by Alina Cojocaru and Johan Kobborg.

The most recent performance was again as part of a series of works by Ashton, marking 25 years since his death, and was danced alternatively by Yuhiui Choe and Alexander Campbell, and Emma Maguire and Valentino Zuchetti.
