= Alexander Grant (dancer) =

New Zealand ballet dancer

Alexander Marshall Grant CBE (22 February 1925 – 30 September 2011) was a New Zealand ballet dancer, teacher, and company director. After moving to London as a young man, he became known as "the Royal Ballet's most remarkable actor-dancer in its golden period from the 1940s to the 1960s."

== Early life and training ==
Alexander Marshall Grant was born in Wellington, New Zealand, the son of hoteliers, during the prosperous 1920s. He resolved to become a professional dancer at the age of six, when he was taught to perform a simple folk dance, a Ukrainian trepak, and discovered the joy of performing. He began taking dancing lessons when he was seven and, under the tutelage of Kathleen O'Brien and Jean Horne, was an experienced amateur by age fifteen. Inspired by performances of Russian ballet troupes that he saw in Australia, he had already begun to develop the exuberant, energetic, and highly theatrical style that would become his trademark in later life. As a result, he won a scholarship from the Royal Academy of Dance to study in England. But, because of the outbreak of war in Europe, he was forced to remain in New Zealand. He studied at Wellington College from 1939 to 1941 and thereafter performed as a song-and-dance man entertaining troops in the Pacific while continuing his dance training during the wartime years. In 1946, after peace had come to England, Grant was able to go to London and enroll in the Sadler's Wells Ballet School. He arrived in February, when he was twenty-one years old. His time as a student there was brief, however, for he was soon invited to become a founding member of the Sadler's Wells Theatre Ballet, a sister company to the Sadler's Wells Ballet, which had relocated to the Royal Opera House at Covent Garden.

== Performing career ==
In September 1946, during his first tour with the young company, Grant was transferred to the main company in Covent Garden, today's Royal Ballet. Because of the shortage of male dancers during the war years, he was swiftly promoted to soloist and assigned featured roles in the Sadler's Wells repertory. Frederick Ashton, chief choreographer of the company, noticed him right away and cast him as a music hall hoofer in the Popular Song duet in Façade. Then, in 1947, guest choreographer Léonide Massine chose him for the leading role of the Barber in a revival of his comic ballet Mam'zelle Angot, a lighthearted romp of amorous pursuits. It proved to be the role that made him a star. As a "whimsical, endearing little person in a tow-colored wig," Grant happily "bounced about the stage like a rubber ball," then collapsed in abject despair before winning the heart of the ballerina in the title role, danced by Margot Fonteyn. The next year, 1948, Ashton devised a spectacular hoop dance for him in Les Sirènes, the first of Grant's many created roles in Ashton ballets.

Promoted to principal dancer in 1950, Grant became one of Ashton's muses, inspiring him and even collaborating with him in the creation of memorable demi-caractère roles. During his thirty years as a dancer with the Royal Ballet, 1946–1976, he appeared in some thirty Ashton ballets, originating roles at more than twenty premieres. It was "Grant's distinction as a classical dancer, combined with his mastery of character, that enabled Ashton to develop what were usually subsidiary supporting roles—the bravura trick soloists—into key players in the main drama, often introducing a provocative sexual charge." Notable roles with an erotic element were Bryaxis the pirate chief in Daphnis and Chloe (1951), Eros in Sylvia (1952), and Tirrenio the sea god in Ondine (1958). Of all his roles, the two most famous are undoubtedly the sweet simpleton Alain in La Fille Mal Gardée (1960) and Bottom the Weaver in The Dream (1964). In the former, he leapt and twirled in a delirium of joy with his red umbrella; in the latter, transformed into an ass, he capered about in pointe shoes, simulating hooves, in an interlude with the lovestruck Titania, played by Antoinette Sibley. His performance was described as "a cameo of great pathos as well as comedy.".

Besides being temperamentally unsuited, Grant was too short to dance princes and aristocrats in fairy-tale ballets in the classic repertory. He did, however, possess a decent classical technique, and he was sometimes thrust into the challenge of clean-lined classicism in such Ashton ballets as Symphonic Variations, Les Patineurs, and Scènes de Ballet. But character roles were his forte. He gave more than fifty performances in the title role of Michel Fokine's Petrushka, and he was acclaimed as the eccentric Doctor Coppélius and the mysterious Herr Drosselmeyer in Coppėlia and Casse Noisette, respectively. He also scored success as the Rake in The Rake's Progress and as Satan in Job, both created by Ninette de Valois, and as the Spanish Miller in The Three-Cornered Hat by Massine. Cast in the role originated by Massine, he always won applause for his performance of the smolderingly intense farruca, a solo form of flamenco. In A Month in the Country (1976), based on Ivan Turgenev's comedy of manners, he offered a moving image of a lovelorn Russian husband, opposite Lynn Seymour as the heroine. It was his final Ashton role.

== Roles created ==
=== In Ashton ballets ===
During the years they worked together, Ashton made numerous roles for Grant. Among them are the following.

- 1946. Les Sirènes, music by Lord Berners. Role: "the boy who jumps through a hoop."
- 1946, The Fairy Queen, masque produced by Ashton and Malcolm Baker-Smith, music by Henry Purcell, adapted by Constant Lambert. Role: a Savage.
- 1948. Scènes de Ballet, music by Igor Stravinsky. Role: principal dancer.
- 1948. Cinderella, music by Sergei Prokofiev. Role: The Jester.
- 1951. Daphnis and Chloë, music by Maurice Ravel. Role: Bryaxis, a pirate chief.
- 1952. Sylvia, music by Léo Delibes. Role: Eros, god of love.
- 1952. Le Lac des Cygnes (The Swan Lake), music by Pyotr Ilyich Tchaikoveky. Role: Neapolitan Dance, with Julia Farron.
- 1953. Homage to the Queen, music by Malcolm Arnold. Role: Spirit of Fire.
- 1954. Trepak, from Casse Noisette (The Nutcracker) (act 2), music by Piotr Ilyich Tchaikovsky. Role: Russian dancer, pas de trois with April Olrich and Michael Boulton.
- 1955. Variations on a Theme by Purcell, music by Benjamin Britten. Role: principal dancer.
- 1955. Madame Chrysanthème, music by Alan Rawsthorne. Role: Pierre, a French sailor.
- 1956. Birthday Offering, music by Alexander Glazunov, arranged by Robert Irving. Role: principal dancer.
- 1958. Ondine, music by Hans Werner Henze. Role: Tirrenio, Lord of the Mediterranean Sea.
- 1960. La Fille Mal Gardée, music by Ferdinand Hérold, arranged and orchestrated by John Lanchbery. Role: Alain, son of Thomas, a prosperous vineyard owner.
- 1961. Persephone, libretto by André Gide, music by Igor Stravinsky. Role: Mercury.
- 1964. The Dream, music by Felix Mendelssohn-Bartholdy, arranged by John Lanchbery. Role: Bottom the Weaver.
- 1968. Jazz Calendar, music by Richard Rodney Bennett. Role: leader of Thursday ensemble.
- 1968. Enigma Variations (My Friends Pictured Within), music by Sir Edward Elgar. Role: William Meath Baker, "country squire, gentleman, and scholar," builder and real estate developer.
- 1971. The Tales of Beatrix Potter, music by John Lanchbery, based on themes by Ludwig Minkus, Jacques Offenbach, Arthur Sullivan, and others. Roles: Peter Rabbit and Pigling Bland.
- 1976. A Month in the Country, music by Frédéric Chopin, arranged by John Lanchbery. Role: Yslaev, husband of Natalia Petrovna.

=== In other works ===
Grant also created roles in other original productions mounted by the Sadler's Wells Ballet. Among them are the following.

- 1946, Khadra, choreography by Cela Franca, music by Jean Sibelius. Role: Ben Oni.
- 1948. The Clock Symphony, choreography by Léonide Massine, music by Franz Joseph Haydn. Role: The Clockmaker.
- 1950. Don Quixote, choreography by Ninette de Valois, music by Roberto Gerhard. Role: Sancho Panza.
- 1950. Ballabile, choreography by Roland Petit, music by Alexis Emmanuel Chabrier. Role: fisherman in "Sunday on the River."
- 1951, Donald of the Burthens, choreography by Léonide Massine, music by Ian Whyte. Role: Donald, a Scottish firewood carrier.
- 1952. Bonne-Bouche: A Cautionary Tale, choreography by John Cranko, music by Arthur Oldham. Role: The Black King.
- 1953. Veneziana, choreography by Andrée Howard, music by Gaetano Donizetti. Role: a lover.
- 1961. Jabez and the Devil, choreography by Alfred Rodrigues, music by Arnold Cooke. Role: The Devil.

== Videography ==
Grant can be seen in roles that he created in four works choreographed for the Royal Ballet by Frederick Ashton.

- 1962, La Fille Mal Gardée. A BBC recording. Black and white. ICA Classics DVD. With the original cast: Nadia Nerina as Lise, David Blair as Colas, Stanley Holden as Widow Simone, and Grant as Alain.
- 1968. The Royal Ballet in "Enigma Variations," in Rehearsal. British Film Institute. Filmed in rehearsal with costumes. Black and white. DVD transferred from 16 mm film. Grant dances the role of William Meath Baker.
- 1969. Cinderella. Kultur DVD. Color recording. Cast includes Antoinette Sibley and Anthony Dowell as Cinderella and the Prince, Frederick Ashton and Robert Helpmann as the Ugly Sisters, and Grant as the Jester.
- 1971. The Tales of Beatrix Potter. An EMI Films picture. Directed by Reginald Mills. Technicolor. Lionsgate DVD. Grant appears in an acting role as Peter Rabbit and in a dancing role as Pigling Bland.

== Later life ==
In 1971, when age and physical disability began to limit the frequency of his performances, Grant became director of Ballet for All, the educational group within the Royal Ballet. He retired from the company in 1976 and accepted the post of artistic director of the National Ballet of Canada, based in Toronto. During his seven years there, he significantly enlarged the company repertory by acquiring works by Ashton, Cranko, MacMillan, Béjart, and other internationally known artists as well as by encouraging such young Canadian choreographers as James Kudelka, He also occasionally appeared on stage as Alain, Carabosse, and various characters in mime roles.

Upon his return to England in 1983, Grant became an extremely popular guest performer and producer. He joined London Festival Ballet (now English National Ballet) as coach and performer, appearing in mostly mime roles such as Doctor Coppélius, Herr Drosselmeyer, and Madge the Witch in La Sylphide. At the "Gala Tribute to Sir Frederick Ashton in Celebration of His 80th Birthday", held on 18 October 1984 at the Royal Opera House, Grant honored his mentor and friend by dancing a role originated by Ashton in 1931, that of the oily Dago in the Tango-Pasodoble of Ashton's perennially popular Façade. He was fifty-nine years old at the time. When Ashton died in 1988, he left the rights to Façade and La Fille Mal Gardée to Grant, who subsequently traveled widely, staging and coaching these ballets for various companies.

== Awards and honours ==
Grant was appointed Commander of the Order of the British Empire (CBE) in the 1965 Queen's Birthday Honours. He also received an Icon Award from the Arts Foundation of New Zealand, in recognition of outstanding achievements in the arts, and the Queen Elizabeth II Coronation Award, the highest honour given by the Royal Academy of Dance, awarded annually in recognition of outstanding service to the art of ballet.

== Personal life ==
Offstage, Grant was one of the most beloved members of the Royal Ballet. He was romantically attached to ballerina Nadia Nerina in his early years in London but abandoned her in 1953 in favor of an intense affair with Ashton, who had fallen deeply in love with him. When their romance cooled, Ashton and Grant became lifelong friends and professional colleagues. In Autumn 1984, Grant was the only personal friend of Ashton to be invited to a dinner party hosted by Princess Margaret in honour of Ashton's recent birthday. When Ashton died in 1988, he left "all royalties and profits from my copyrights" to a small group of friends. Those to Façade and La Fille Mal Gardée were bequeathed to Grant.

In old age, Grant underwent a hip replacement and prostate surgery. His second hip replacement should have been a routine procedure and recovery, but it turned into an even-month stay in hospital. He died in 2011, at age 86. He was survived by his partner Jean-Pierre Gasquet, his companion of 54 years, and his brother Garry, 15 years his junior. Also a dancer with the Royal Ballet, Garry Grant inherited many of his older brother's more famous roles.
