= Ashley Dukes =

English playwright and dramatist

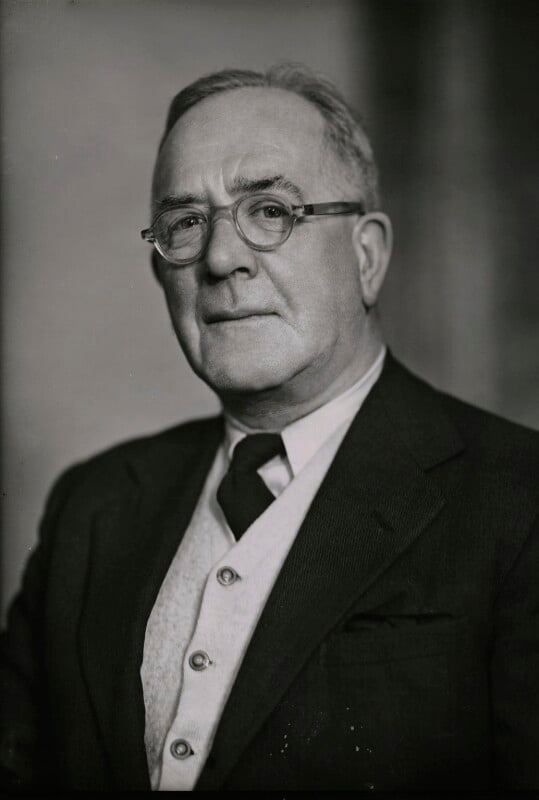
- Dukes in 1949
- Born: 29 May 1885; Sandford, Devon, England, United Kingdom
- Died: 4 May 1959 (aged 73)
- Occupations: Playwright, critic, theatre manager
- Spouse: Dame Marie Rambert
- Family: Paul Dukes, Cuthbert Dukes (brothers)

Ashley Dukes (29 May 1885 – 4 May 1959) was an English playwright, critic and theatre manager. He was the husband of ballet dancer Dame Marie Rambert and grandfather to poet Aidan Andrew Dun.

== Biography ==
=== Personal life ===
Ashley Dukes was born one of five children in 1885. He was the son of the Congregationalist clergyman, Rev. Edwin Joshua Dukes (1847–1930), of Kingsland, London, and his wife, the former Edith Mary Pope (1863–1898), of Sandford, Devon. He was the older brother of MI6 spy Paul Dukes and pathologist Cuthbert Dukes. He was educated at Silcoates School, Wakefield, and the University of Manchester and the Ludwig-Maximilians-Universität München.

He met Marie Rambert, a ballet dancer, at a dinner party in 1917. In Rambert's autobiography she says "after four days of personal meetings, and seven months of correspondence we were married on 3 March 1918."

=== Career ===
He initially taught science at university and became a drama critic in 1909. He wrote for several publications until 1925. Dukes wrote The World to Play With concerning the theatre and the play was published by Oxford University Press in 1928.

In 1933, he founded the Mercury Theatre in London and wrote plays that appeared in the West End of London and on Broadway in New York. The Ashley Dukes Company was an important interwar promoter of serious drama, and a training ground for actors.

Dukes mounted the first theatrical performance of Murder in the Cathedral at the Mercury, driving down to Canterbury with T. S. Eliot to collect scenery and costumes. (He rejected W. B. Yeats' dramatic oeuvre for the same stage much to Yeats' annoyance.) Other plays he wrote included Man with a Load of Mischief.
