= Viacheslav Samodurov =

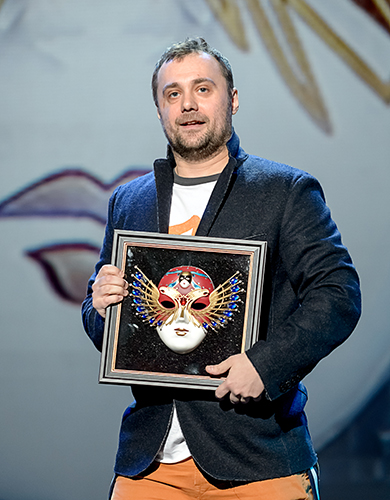
- With the Golden Mask award, Moscow, April 2015
- Born: Viacheslav Vladimirovich Samodurov; 19 May 1974 (age 52); Tallinn, Estonia
- Citizenship: Russian Federation
- Education: Vaganova Academy
- Occupations: Ballet dancer Choreographer
- Years active: 1992 to present
- Employer(s): Yekaterinburg Opera and Ballet Theatre

Viacheslav Samodurov (Russian: Вячеслав Самодуров; born 19 May 1974) is a former Principal dancer of the Royal Ballet, Covent Garden in London. Prior to this, he was a Principal Dancer at the Mariinsky Ballet, St. Petersburg and the Dutch National Ballet, Amsterdam.

== Career ==
Born in Tallinn in Estonia in 1974, Samodurov trained at the Vaganova Academy in St. Petersburg. Viacheslav joined the Mariinsky Ballet's corps de ballet in 1992. In 1996, he became a soloist, and won the 1st Prize at the Maya International Ballet Competition, St. Petersburg. He relocated to the UK to join the Royal Ballet in 2003, and left the company in 2010.

He is artistic director of the Yekaterinburg Ballet Company since 2011/12 season. He choreographed Amore Buffo after L’elisir d’amore by Gaetano Donizetti; Cantus Arcticus to the music of Einojuhani Rautavaara; The Salieri Variations to the music of Antonio Salieri; Colordelic to the music of Pyotr Tchaikovsky, Arvo Pärt and Francis Poulenc; Curtain to the music of Ottorino Respighi; Prokofiev's Romeo & Juliet (revision of the ballet mounted for the Royal Ballet of Flanders in 2014), and The Snow Queen by Artyom Vasiliev.

In 2016 he staged Ondine by Hans Werner Henze at the Bolshoi Theatre.

== Selected repertoire ==
- Solor in La Bayadère
- Conrad in Le Corsaire
- Tchaikovsky Pas de Deux
- Prince Désiré in The Sleeping Beauty
- Prince Siegfried in Swan Lake
- Paris in Romeo and Juliet
- The third movement in Symphony in C
- Rubies in Jewels
- Le jeune homme et la mort

=== Created roles ===
- Y. Petukhov's Postscriptum
- A. Ratmansky's Fairy kiss
- A. Ratmansky's Poem of ecstasy

== Awards ==
- 1996: 1st prize at the Maya International Ballet Competition, St. Petersburg
- 2014: Golden Mask for the production of Salieri Variations, 2013
- 2015: Golden Mask for the production of Colordelic, 2013
- 2016: the prize «Soul of Dance», Moscow
- 2020: Golden Mask for the production of The King's order, 2018

== See also ==
- List of Russian ballet dancers
