= Marie Rambert =

Polish-born English dancer (1888–1982)

Dame Marie Rambert DBE
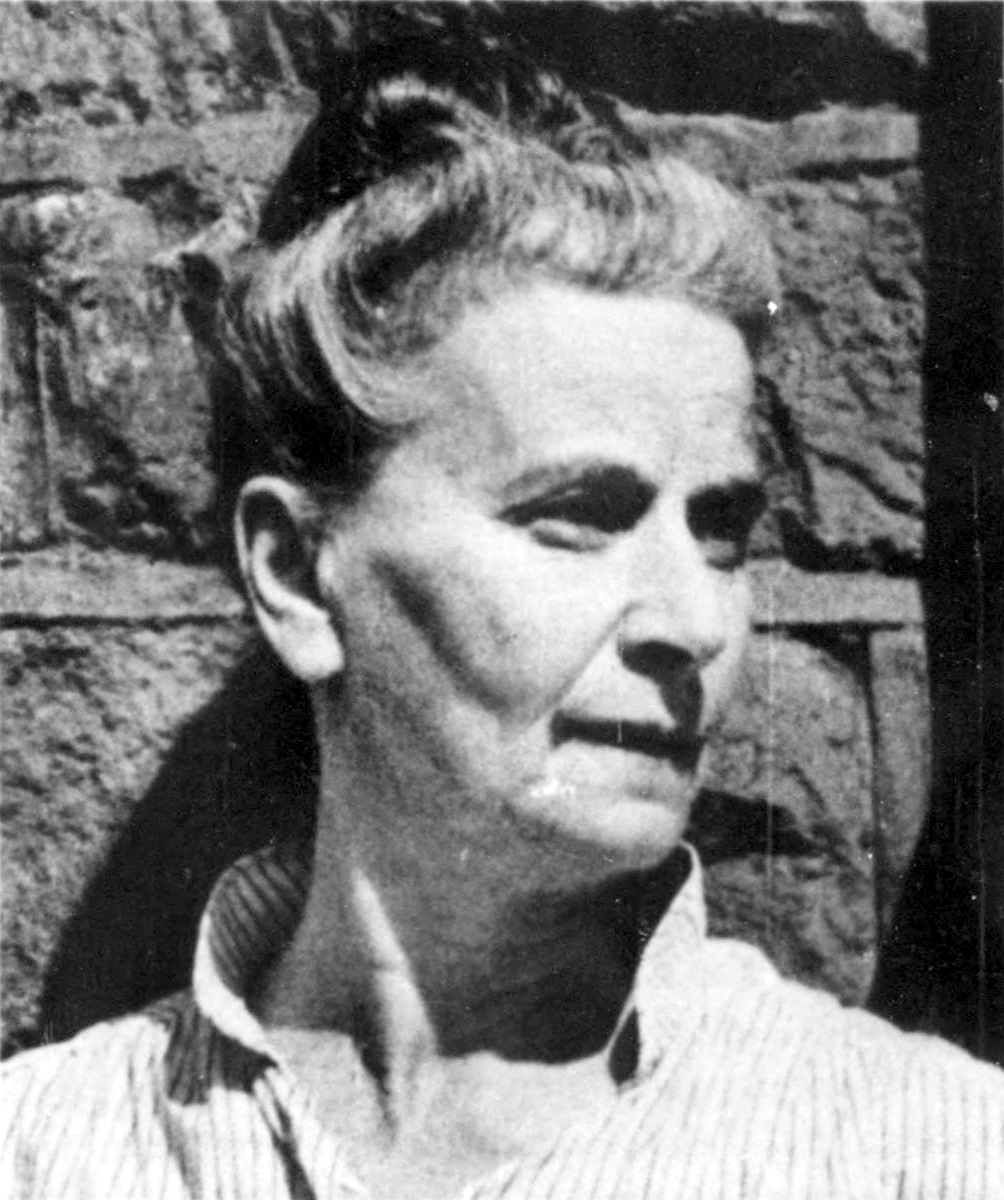
- Rambert in 1959
- Born: Cyvia Rambam; 20 February 1888; Warsaw, Congress Poland, Russian Empire
- Died: 12 June 1982 (aged 94); London, England
- Occupations: Ballerina and dance pedagogue
- Years active: 1912–1979
- Known for: Founder of Ballet Rambert, now Rambert Dance Company
- Spouse: Ashley Dukes (1918–1959; his death)
- Children: 2

Dame Marie Rambert DBE (born Cyvia Rambam; 20 February 1888 – 12 June 1982) was a Polish-born English dancer and pedagogue who exerted great influence on British ballet, both as a dancer and teacher.

== Early years and background ==
Born to a liberal Lithuanian Jewish family in Warsaw, Congress Poland, she was originally named Cyvia (Cesia) Rambam. Her father and two of his brothers later changed their last names to make them seem only children in order to escape military service in the Imperial Russian Army; and so, while one brother retained the name Rambam, her father changed his to Ramberg, another of his brothers went to Rambert, and the last changed his name to Warszawski. She changed her name to Myriam Ramberg, and finally left it in the French form Marie Rambert. In later years she was known to friends and dancers as Mim.

Her father, Yakov Ramberg (1855–1928), born in Vištytis, a small town in Suwałki Governorate (nowadays in Lithuania), was a learned merchant and Hebrew publisher and lexicographer, and a Zionist. Her mother, Eiga Ramberg (née Lap), born in the town of Suchowola (nowadays in north-east Poland), daughter of Rabbi Elhanan Tzvi Lap, was a community worker.

Rambert was the fourth of seven children. The eldest child, Rakhel, was the wife of Hebrew writer Micha Josef Berdyczewski. The second, Ewa Ramberg-Figulla, was a Slavist, the wife of German Hittitologist Hugo Heinrich Figulla and mother of physicist Johannes Figulla (father-in-law of German writer Christoph Hein and grandfather of German writer Jakob Hein).

Rambert met her husband Ashley Dukes, a soldier on leave, at a dinner party in 1917. In Rambert's autobiography she says "after four days of personal meetings, and seven months of correspondence we were married on 3 March 1918." This was done partly as a joke so that Dukes could get four weeks of extended leave instead of two days. Their marriage lasted 41 years, until he died in 1959; the couple had two daughters, Angela (1920–2006) and Helena. The poet, Aidan Andrew Dun, is her grandson.

== Training ==
Rambert began her dance training in her schooling early on. Subjects such as foreign languages and history seemed to come easy; however she was a restless child and ended up getting bad marks because of her endless movements during class. At one point in her early training her dance instructor stated that 'In her, was the true spirit of dance.' She was unimpressed with the structure and performance of ballet, and was not drawn into dance as a passion until she became enthralled by Isadora Duncan when, in 1904, she attended one of Duncan's performances, and was "profoundly moved by the beauty of Duncan's dance".

In 1905, after becoming active in political riots, and the tragic day of May Day, Rambert's parents urged her at one point to move to Paris and take up medicine while safely living with her aunt and uncle who were also doctors. She attended a party where she danced a mazurka and danced it with such liveliness that there was applause afterwards; this was her first performance, whether she thought it or not. She met Raymond Duncan, brother of Isadora, at this same party, who congratulated her on a wonderful performance, and again she was back into her passion for dance. She studied with Madame Rat from the Paris Opera, and later studied with Émile Jaques-Dalcroze, at Dalcroze College who introduced her to eurhythmics.

One day at the Dalcroze College, Sergei Diaghilev, watched a class and then asked her to come back to Berlin and study with him in the Ballets Russes. There, Rambert aided them with figuring out Igor Stravinsky's The Rite of Spring with Vaslav Nijinsky. She hesitantly accepted and collaborated with the Ballets Russes led by Diaghilev from 1912 to 1913. In Ballets Russes she was in the corps de ballet for ballet performances such as Swan Lake, Giselle, and Scheherazade. After a tour with Nijinsky and Ballets Russes, Rambert's contract was not continued and she decided it was time for a new chapter. In 1914, she moved to the United Kingdom, and studied under Enrico Cecchetti.

== Ballet Rambert ==
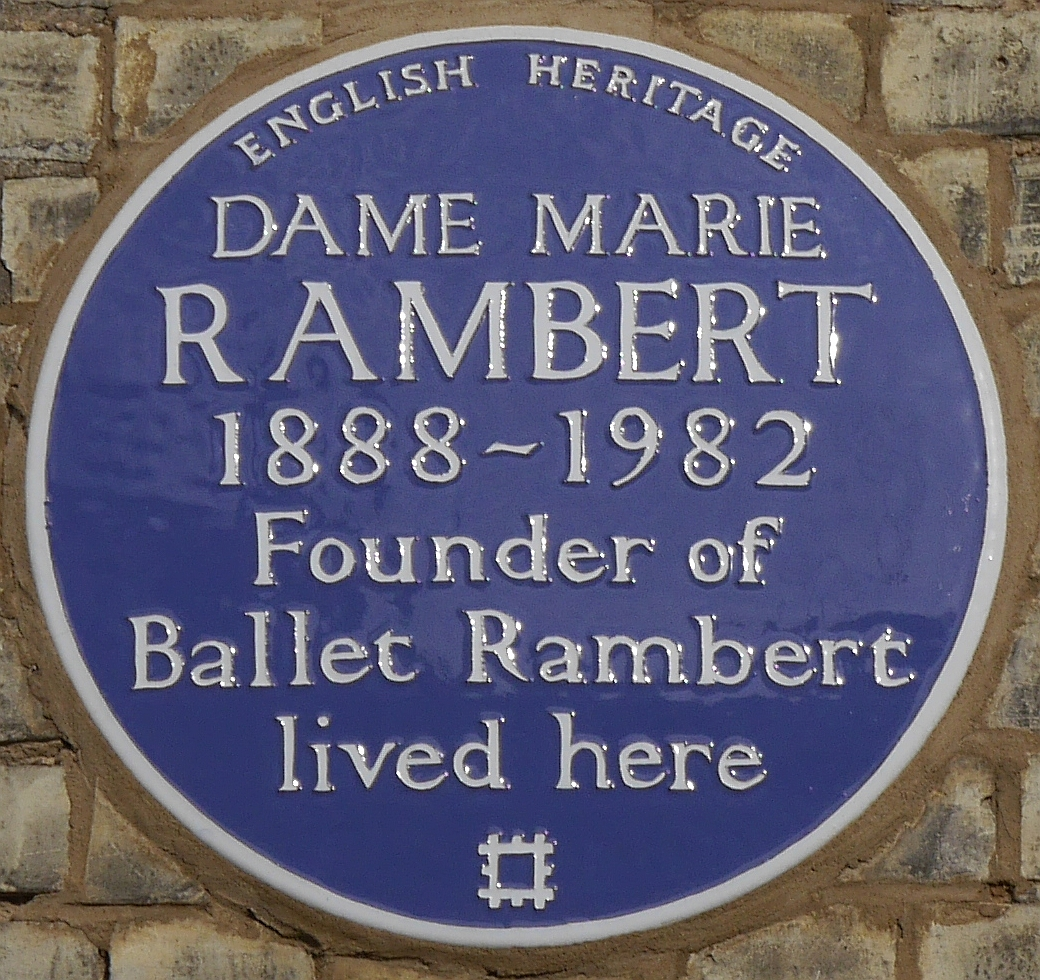
Blue plaque, 19 Campden Hill Gardens, London

After studying with Cecchetti, she went back to study with Madame Rat at the Paris Opera, and took her studies quite seriously. She began teaching more ballet classes in 1919 and later founded her own ballet school in Bedford Gardens. In 1926 she created her own company, originally named Ballet Club. It has been through many name changes, much like Rambert herself. The company began performing at night revues in London. The first informal show was performed in Riverside Nights at the Lyric Theatre, and continued with the nightly revues for a while. She began finding new and promising dancers and choreographers in numerous places, such as Frederick Ashton and William Chappell, to be a part of her company and gave them a chance to grow. From Marie Rambert Dancers, the company changed to Ballet Rambert, later Rambert Dance Company, and from 2014 just named Rambert, a contemporary dance company which tours internationally. It dates its birth to the first performance of Frederick Ashton's A Tragedy of Fashion (1926), making it the first ballet company in Britain.

Ashley Dukes, Marie's husband, renovated a building and made it into Mercury Theatre, where the majority of Ballet Rambert's performance occurred. It was said that 'Notting Hill Gate, where the Mercury Theatre stood, was on the slopes of Olympus'. Ballet Rambert has performed such ballets as Coppelia, as well as Balanchine's Night Shadow.

Rambert was adamant about finding new and upcoming choreographers. Some of her students and later her colleagues included Ashton, Antony Tudor, and Agnes de Mille, to name a few. In 1965 Rambert, with the help of "Norman Morrice, her newest discovery, completely reorganized the company to stress modern dance". The repertoire of the company eventually came back to more contemporary ballets, but still has a vast list of pieces that the company has performed throughout the years. She cooperated with Millicent Hodson, to restore Nijinsky's choreography of The Rite of Spring in 1979. The restoration of choreography was completed in 1987. Rambert is known for helping to create and keep the ballet community strong in Britain. "The creation of Ballet in Britain is one of the grandest achievements in the artistic annals of our century. It is owed absolutely to the idealism which fired Rambert and Ninette de Valois", the founder of The Royal Ballet. She was the subject of This Is Your Life in 1962, when she was surprised by Eamonn Andrews at the Mercury Theatre, Notting Hill Gate.

== Death ==
She died at her home in Campden Hill Gardens on 12 June 1982, and was cremated at Golders Green Crematorium on 17 June. Her ashes are within the Cloister Walk in section B.

== Honours ==
- 1953, Commander of the Order of the British Empire (CBE) in the 1953 Coronation Honours
- 1957, Chevalier of the Légion d'honneur
- 1957, Queen Elizabeth II Coronation Award, presented by the Royal Academy of Dance
- 1962, Dame Commander of the Order of the British Empire (DBE) in the 1962 New Year Honours "for services to Ballet"
- 1979, Gold Medal of the Order of Merit of the Republic of Poland

== See also ==
- List of dancers
- Women in dance

== Bibliography ==
- Marie Rambert (1972). Quicksilver: Autobiography. London: St. Martin's Press. ISBN 0-333-08942-1.
- Clement Crisp (1981). Ballet Rambert: 50 Years and on. London, Ballet Rambert. p. 111. ISBN 0-9505478-1-6.
