= Frederick Ashton =

British dancer and choreographer (1904–1988)

Sir Frederick Ashton OM CH CBE
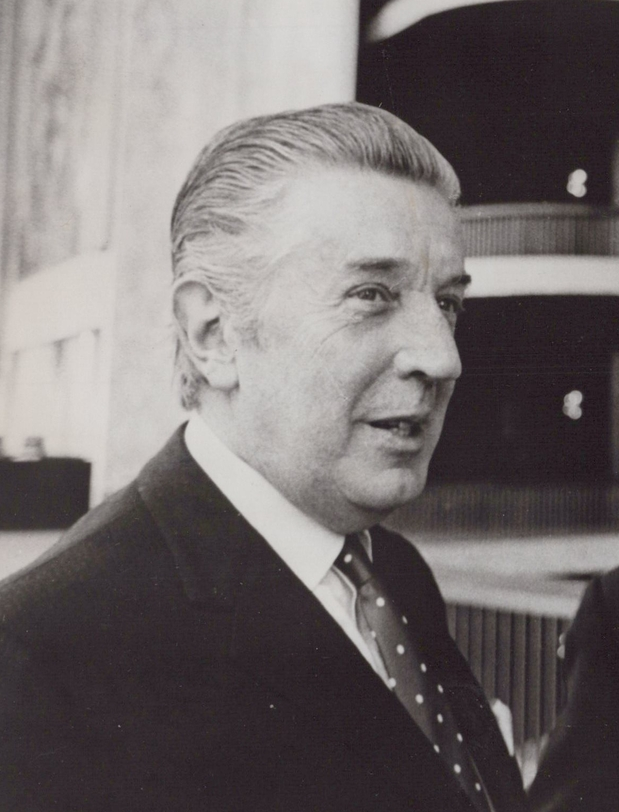
- Ashton, 1960s
- Born: Frederick William Mallandaine Ashton; 17 September 1904; Guayaquil, Ecuador
- Died: 18 August 1988 (aged 83); Chandos Lodge, Eye, Suffolk, England
- Citizenship: British
- Occupation: Choreographer
- Years active: 1926–1980
- Notable work: Symphonic Variations (1946); Cinderella (1948); Sylvia (1952); Ondine (1958); La fille mal gardée (1960)

Sir Frederick William Mallandaine Ashton (17 September 1904 – 18 August 1988) was a British ballet dancer and choreographer. He also worked as a director and choreographer in opera, film and revue.

Determined to be a dancer despite the opposition of his conventional middle-class family, Ashton was accepted as a pupil by Léonide Massine and then by Marie Rambert. In 1926 Rambert encouraged him to try his hand at choreography, and though he continued to dance professionally, with success, it was as a choreographer that he became famous.

Ashton was chief choreographer to Ninette de Valois, from 1935 until her retirement in 1963, in the company known successively as the Vic-Wells Ballet, the Sadler's Wells Ballet and the Royal Ballet. He succeeded de Valois as director of the company, serving until his own retirement in 1970.

Ashton is widely credited with the creation of a specifically English genre of ballet. Among his best-known works are Façade (1931), Symphonic Variations (1946), Cinderella (1948), La fille mal gardée (1960), Monotones I and II (1965), Enigma Variations (1968) and the ballet film The Tales of Beatrix Potter (1971).

== Life and career ==
=== Early years ===
Ashton was born in Guayaquil, Ecuador, the fourth of the five children of George Ashton (1864–1924) and his second wife, Georgiana (1869–1939), née Fulcher. George Ashton was manager of the Central and South American Cable Company and vice-consul at the British consulate in Guayaquil.

In 1907, the family moved to Lima, Peru, where Ashton attended a Dominican school. When they returned to Guayaquil in 1914, he attended a school for children of the English colony. One of his formative influences was serving as an altar boy, which inspired in him a love of ritual, as demonstrated in The Wise Virgins. Another, still more potent, influence was being taken to see Anna Pavlova dance in 1917. He was immediately determined that he would become a dancer.

Dancing was not a career acceptable to a conventional English family at that time. Ashton later recalled, "My father was horrified. You can imagine the middle-class attitude. My mother would say, 'He wants to go on the stage.' She could not bring herself to say 'into the ballet.'" Ashton's father sent him to England in 1919 to Dover College, where he was miserable. Homosexual, and with an accent that his classmates laughed at, he did not fit in at a minor public school of the early 1920s.

He was not academically inclined, and his father decided that, upon leaving the school in 1921, Ashton should join a commercial company. He worked for an import–export firm in the City of London, where his ability to speak Spanish and French as well as English was an advantage. In January 1924, George Ashton committed suicide. His widow was left financially dependent on her elder sons, who ran a successful business in Guayaquil. She moved to London to be with Ashton and his younger sister, Edith.

=== Massine and Rambert ===
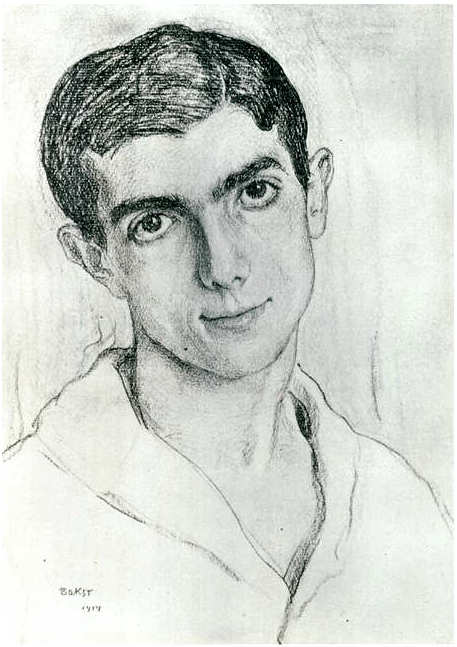
Massine in 1914

Despite family disapproval (and at first in secret) Ashton pursued his ambition to dance professionally. He auditioned for Léonide Massine; at the unusually late age of twenty he was accepted as a pupil. After Massine left London, Ashton was taken on as a student by Marie Rambert.. She encouraged him to try choreographing. His first attempt was in 1926 for a revue staged by Nigel Playfair and Rambert's husband Ashley Dukes. The Observer commented on "an engaging little ballet called A Tragedy of Fashion: or The Scarlet Scissors, which Mr. Eugene Goossens has set most suitably to music. Miss Marie Rambert, as an impudently vivacious mannequin, and Mr. Frederick Ashton as a distracted man modist, lead the dancing. It is as chic a trifle as Mr Playfair's modish establishment leads you to expect."

Rambert sought to widen her students' horizons, taking them to see London performances by the Diaghilev Ballet. They had a great influence on Ashton—most particularly Bronislava Nijinska's ballet Les biches. In 1930 Ashton created an innovative ballet, Capriol Suite, using Peter Warlock's 1926 suite of the same name. The music was based on 16th-century French music, and Ashton researched the dances of the earlier era, and created a period piece with "basse danse, pavane, tordion, and bransle—smoothly mixing robust masculine leaps with courtly duets." The following year Rambert founded the Ballet Club, forerunner of the Ballet Rambert, with Alicia Markova as prima ballerina and Ashton as the main choreographer and one of the leading dancers.

Ashton's ballets of the early 1930s included La péri (1931), The Lady of Shalott (1931), Façade (1931), Foyer de danse (1932) and Les Masques (1933). He also contributed to West End revues and musicals, including The Cat and the Fiddle (1932) for C. B. Cochran, and Gay Hussar (1933), in which The Manchester Guardian singled out the "spirited and lovely choreography in the classic manner".

=== Vic-Wells ===
Ashton's association with Ninette de Valois, founder of the Vic-Wells Ballet, began in 1931, when he created a comic ballet, Regatta for her. It received mixed reviews; The Times thought it successful as "a piece of flippant amusement", but The Manchester Guardian considered that "it completely fails ... definitely a poor show". Nevertheless, Ashton was by now recognised as a choreographer of considerable talent and had gained a national, though not yet international, reputation.

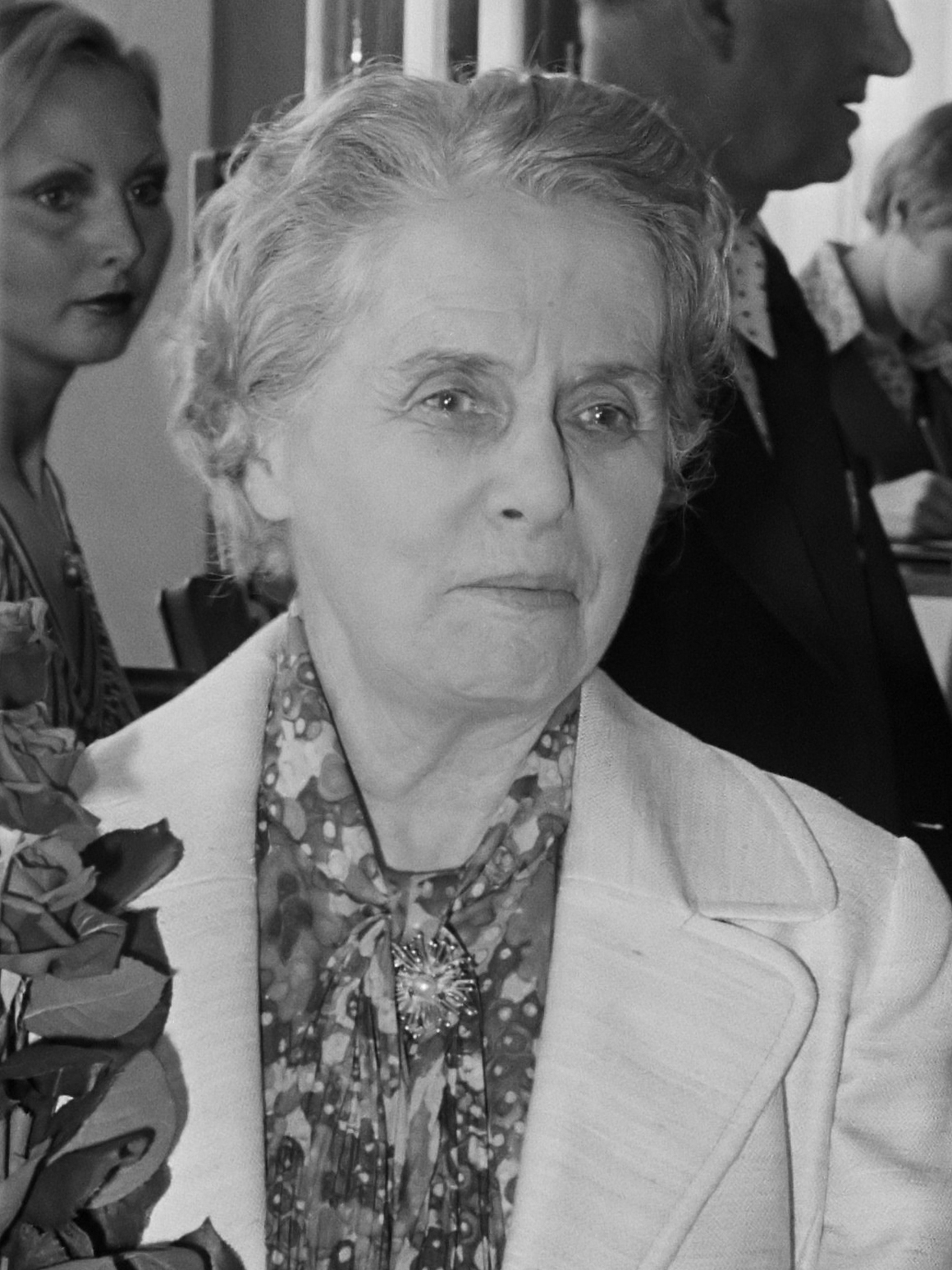
Ninette de Valois with whom Ashton was associated from 1931

In 1933 Ashton devised another work for de Valois and her company, the ballet-divertissement Les Rendezvous. Robert Greskovic describes the work as a "classically precise yet frothy excursion showcas[ing] big skirted 'ballet girls' and dashing swain partners". The piece was an immediate success, has been revived many times, and at 2013 remains in the Royal Ballet's repertoire eighty years after its creation. In 1935 de Valois appointed Ashton as resident choreographer of her company, where he worked alongside Constant Lambert, the musical director from 1931 until 1947, and a company including Markova, Anton Dolin and Robert Helpmann. The Times describes Ashton's first years with the Vic-Wells as a richly productive period: "His Apparitions in 1936 was by many compared favourably with Massine's Symphonie Fantastique on a similar theme, and that year saw also the touching Nocturne to Delius's Paris. These works have vanished, but the following year's witty A Wedding Bouquet and Les Patineurs are still with us."

In 1936–37, his homosexuality notwithstanding, Ashton had an affair with an American heiress and socialite, Alice von Hofmannsthal. After the affair ended, her love for him continued, though she had two subsequent marriages, both to gay Englishmen.

As the 1930s progressed, Ashton's career began to extend internationally. In 1934 he choreographed Virgil Thomson's opera Four Saints in Three Acts in New York, and in 1939 he created his first ballet for a foreign company: Devil's Holiday (Le Diable s'amuse) for the Ballet Russe de Monte-Carlo. He continued to create dances for other forms of theatre, from revues such as The Town Talks and Home and Beauty, to opera, including Clive Carey's production of Die Fledermaus at Sadler's Wells, and film, notably Escape Me Never, another collaboration with William Walton, following Façade four years earlier.

=== Sadler's Wells and Covent Garden ===
Shortly before the outbreak of the Second World War Ashton was offered a position in New York with what was to become the American Ballet Theatre. He declined, and returned to de Valois' company, soon renamed "Sadler's Wells Ballet". He created some works along more sombre lines, including Dante Sonata, which symbolised the unending struggle between the children of darkness and the children of light. (Note: The work dropped out of the repertoire and was thought lost until 2000, when the Birmingham Royal Ballet staged a reconstruction by Jean Bedells and Pauline Clayden with help from Pamela May.) In Ballet magazine, Lynette Halewood commented in 2000, "No other work by Ashton is so disturbing and so bleak".

In 1941 Ashton was called up for war service. He was commissioned as an officer in the Royal Air Force, at first analysing aerial photographs and later as an intelligence officer. While in the RAF he was granted occasional spells of leave to carry on his work with the ballet. His collaboration with Walton continued with The Quest (1943). It was created and staged in a hurry, and Walton later said that it was not much of a success from anyone's point of view. It had a theme of knightly chivalry, though Walton observed that Helpmann in the lead looked more like the Dragon than St George. As with the 1940 Ashton-Walton collaboration The Wise Virgins, the music has survived but the ballet has not.

Mr. Frederick Ashton has devised a ballet for six dancers without drama and without characterisation – a "pure" ballet, in which the interest is wholly concentrated upon the dance and its relation to the music. That the new ballet holds one's attention from the first motionless tableau until the dancers sink into repose again at the end is a measure of Mr. Ashton's success.

— The Times on Symphonic Variations, 1946

After the end of the war David Webster invited de Valois to move her company from Sadler's Wells to be resident at the Royal Opera House, Covent Garden alongside the new opera company he was establishing. (Note: De Valois had a very free hand in running the company, but she remained answerable to a board of governors, whose support she needed, and received, for the move. Ashton, who knew and approved of Webster, was strongly in favour, and put such weight as he then had behind it. Though no longer resident at Sadler's Wells Theatre, the company continued to be called the Sadler's Wells Ballet until 1957.) Ashton's first ballet for the company in its new home was Symphonic Variations (1946). The historian Montague Haltrecht writes of it, "It is a masterpiece created for the Opera House and for the company's dancers, and almost of itself defines a style of English dancing." Although the Covent Garden stage was much larger than that at Sadler's Wells, Ashton confined himself to six dancers, led by Margot Fonteyn and Michael Somes. The work, which remains in the repertoire as at 2013, was a success from the outset.

Another plotless ballet was Scènes de ballet (1947), which remains a repertoire piece. (Note: Initially, Scènes de ballet divided critical opinion. The Times commented that it "had the one merit of brevity"; Richard Buckle in The Observer wrote, "The only fault ... is that it is not the last act of a long classical ballet. Such a display of noble movement should be the culmination of a spectacle: yet before we realise its beauty this pearl of great price has dissolved – in eighteen minutes." Ashton's own description of the ballet was, "It has a distant, uncompromising beauty which says I am here, beautiful, but I will make no effort to charm you." In 2004 Debra Craine called the work "pure classicism at its most invigorating.") In 1948, at the urging of de Valois, Ashton created his first major three-act ballet for a British company, his version of Prokofiev's Cinderella. The original cast included Moira Shearer as Cinderella, Somes as the Prince, Alexander Grant as the jester, and Ashton and Helpmann en travesti as Cinderella's stepsisters. (Note: Ashton and Helpmann continued to play the stepsisters in many revivals up to the end of 1975. On occasion, when Helpmann was unavailable, Ashton was joined by Kenneth MacMillan.) Some critics have commented that Ashton was not yet fully in control of a full-length ballet, with intermittent weaknesses in the choreography, but the comedy of the stepsisters was, and has remained, a favourite with audiences. The ballet critic Laura Jacobs called it "slapstick of a celestial order", and recalled that she and her fellow New York critics were "struck speechless by this luminous ballet".

In the late 1940s and early 1950s Ashton worked more frequently for other ballet companies, creating works for the Ballets de Paris (Le Rêve de Léonor, 1949, to Britten's Bridge Variations) and the New York City Ballet (Illuminations, 1950, to Britten's Les Illuminations, and Picnic at Tintagel, 1952, to Bax's The Garden of Fand). He created dances for films, including The Tales of Hoffmann (1951) (Note: Helpmann, Massine and Ashton all appeared in the film. Massine (as Spalanzani) choreographed his own role.) and The Story of Three Loves (1953), and directed operas at Glyndebourne (Britten's Albert Herring, 1947) and Covent Garden (Massenet's Manon, 1947, and Gluck's Orpheus, 1953, conducted by Sir John Barbirolli with Kathleen Ferrier in the title role).

Ashton's second full-length ballet for de Valois' company was Sylvia (1952). Ashton's biographer Kathrine Sorley Walker considers that it works "even less well" than Cinderella, but contemporary reviews praised it with little or no reservation. In 2005, reviewing a New York revival, the critic Jennie Schulman called it a "blockbuster", "radiant" with "choreographic abundance to please even the most finicky of gods and the most demanding of balletomanes".

Ashton's third full-length ballet was Romeo and Juliet for the Royal Danish Ballet in 1955. It was a considerable success, but Ashton resisted attempts to present it at Covent Garden, which he thought too large a theatre and stage for his intimate treatment of the story. It was not seen in London until 1985 when it was produced by the London Festival Ballet rather than at Covent Garden.

=== Royal Ballet ===
In October 1956 Elizabeth II granted Sadler's Wells Ballet a charter, giving it the title of "the Royal Ballet" with effect from 15 January 1957. This recognised the eminence the company had achieved: internationally it was widely regarded as "the leading company outside Russia". De Valois remained the director of the company, with Ashton as principal choreographer.

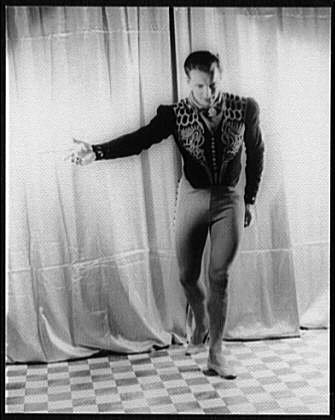
Antony Tudor, invited by Ashton to make works for Covent Garden

One of Ashton's most celebrated ballets was created for the Royal Ballet in 1960: La fille mal gardée. The first ballet of that title had been presented in France in 1789, and several later versions had been staged in the 19th century, using music by various composers. Ashton did his customary careful research and decided to make use of Ferdinand Hérold's music (1828), arranged, with additions from other versions, by John Lanchbery. Walker says of the work, "He adhered closely to the original scenario, but created deliciously inventive new choreography that was the happiest amalgam of classical ballet and English folk-dance, while Osbert Lancaster's delightful designs were firmly related to French country life." It was an immediate success, and has been regularly staged since, not only by the Royal Ballet, but by companies in ten other European countries and in Australia, Canada, Hong Kong, New Zealand, South Africa and the US.

When de Valois retired in 1963, Ashton succeeded her as director. His time in charge was looked on as something of a golden age. Under him, the corps de ballet was recognised as rivalling and even excelling the best anywhere else in the world. He continued to add to the repertoire with his own new productions, he persuaded his former mentor Bronislava Nijinska to revive her Les biches and Les noces, and he presented Mam'zelle Angot by his other mentor, Massine. He also brought in Antony Tudor, his English contemporary, better known in the US, to stage both new and old works. The ballet critic John Percival considered that despite the numerous glories of the company under Ashton's directorship, he was unsuited to and uninterested in management, and lacked de Valois' gift for strategic planning (though better in both these regards than his successor as director, Kenneth MacMillan). Percival believed that this weakened the company in the long term. Ashton's works for the company while he was director included The Dream (1964) (for Anthony Dowell and Antoinette Sibley), the pas de trois Monotones II (1965), Jazz Calendar (1968) and Enigma Variations (My Friends Pictured Within) (1968).

Webster, due to retire in 1970 as general administrator of the Royal Opera House, decided that his departure should be accompanied by a change to the leadership of the two companies. Georg Solti, musical director of the opera company, was keen to concentrate on his new post as conductor of the Chicago Symphony Orchestra, and did not wish to renew his Covent Garden contract when it expired in 1971. Ashton had frequently told colleagues how he looked forward to his own retirement, but nonetheless was hurt by the abruptness with which his departure was arranged and announced by Webster. He stood down in July 1970 after a farewell gala organised by Michael Somes, John Hart and Leslie Edwards.

After his retirement, Ashton made several short ballets as pièces d'occasion, but his only longer works were the cinema film, The Tales of Beatrix Potter made in 1970 and released in 1971, and A Month in the Country (1976), a one-act piece, lasting about forty minutes, freely adapted from Turgenev's comedy of manners. The piece has been revived regularly, in every decade since the premiere.

Ashton's last years were marred by the death of his partner, Martyn Thomas, in a car crash in 1985 – a blow from which Ashton never fully recovered. He died in his sleep on 19 August 1988, at his country home in Suffolk, and was buried on 24 August at St Mary's Church, Yaxley, Suffolk.

== Choreography ==
Ashton created more than eighty ballets. In his Who's Who entry, he identified his best-known works as:

Full-length ballets

- Cinderella (1948)
- Sylvia (1952)
- Romeo and Juliet (1955) – for Royal Danish Ballet.
- Ondine (1958)
- La fille mal gardée (1960)

Shorter works

- Façade (1931)
- Apparitions (1936)
- Les Patineurs (1937)
- A Wedding Bouquet (1937)
- Horoscope (1938)
- Symphonic Variations (1946)
- Scènes de ballet (1948)
- Illuminations (1950)
- Daphnis and Chloe (1951)
- Birthday Offering (1956)
- The Two Pigeons (1961)
- Marguerite and Armand (1963)
- The Dream (1964)
- Sinfonietta (1967)
- Jazz Calendar (1968)
- Enigma Variations (1968)
- The Walk to the Paradise Garden (1972)
- A Month in the Country (1976)
- Rhapsody (1980)
- Varii Capricci (1983)

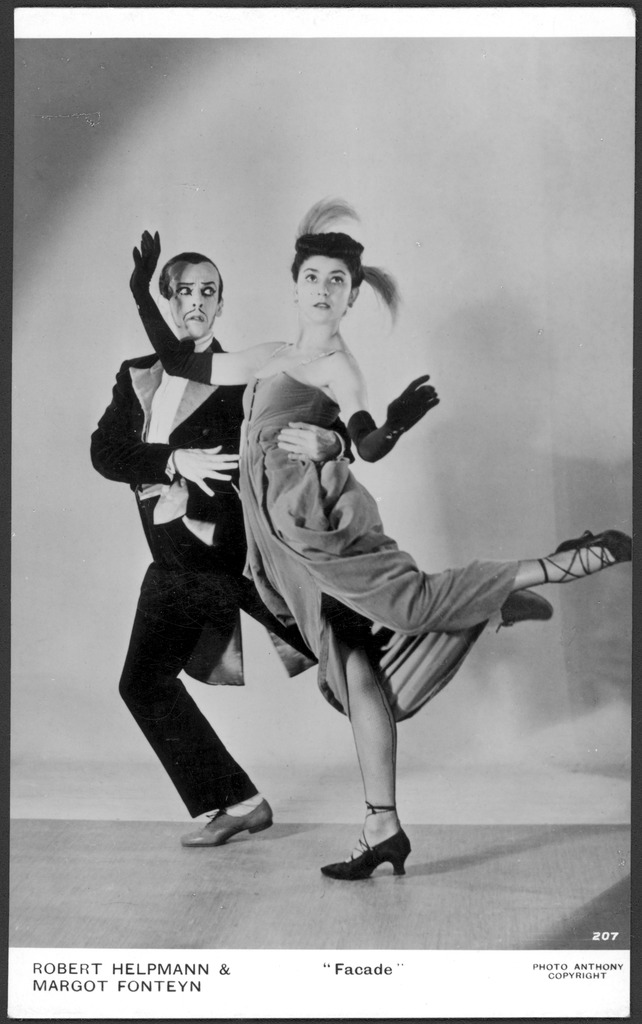
Helpmann and Fonteyn: the tango-pasodoble in Façade

Other notable Ashton ballets include:

- La valse (1958)
- Monotones I and II (1965)
- The Tales of Beatrix Potter (1970 film)
- Méditation from Thaïs (1971)
- Voices of Spring (1977)

=== The Fred Step ===
Ashton included in many of his ballets a signature step, known to dancers as "the Fred step". It is defined by David Vaughan as "posé en arabesque, coupé dessous, small développé a la seconde, pas de bourrée dessous, pas de chat". Adrian Grater has enlarged the definition to include the transitional movements; this in Benesh notation is transcribed thus:

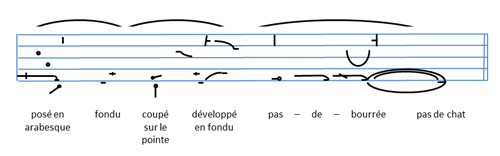

It was based on a step used by Anna Pavlova in a gavotte that she frequently performed. Alicia Markova recalled in 1994 that Ashton had first used the step in a short ballet that concluded Nigel Playfair's 1930 production of Marriage à la Mode. It is not seen in Ashton's 1931 Façade, but after that, it became a feature of his choreography. The critic Alastair Macaulay writes:

[T]he Fred step is often tucked away. He may give it to the ballerina (Antoinette Sibley as La Capricciosa in Varii Capricci, 1983) or to supporting dancers (Symphonic Variations, 1946). He may give it to a corps de ballet of peasants (Sylvia 1952), to junior dancers (a pair of dancing artichokes in the ... vegetable ballet he made for the 1979 film "Stories from a Flying Trunk"), or to a minor character (Moth in The Dream, 1964). Often the eye is distracted from it by action elsewhere onstage. In each instance, it is changed in some aspect (particularly its conclusion), so that the entire step seems metamorphosed.

Ashton himself danced the step as the timorous sister in Cinderella, and later he and Fonteyn danced a gentle version of it together in Salut d'amour, created by Ashton for her sixtieth birthday gala at Covent Garden. The Royal Ballet has a demonstration of the step on its website, explained by the company's ballet mistress, Ursula Hageli and danced by Romany Pajdak.

== Legacy ==
Ashton left the rights to many of his ballets to friends and colleagues, including Fonteyn (Daphnis and Chloe and Ondine), Dowell (The Dream and A Month in the Country), Michael Somes (Cinderella and Symphonic Variations), Alexander Grant (La fille mal gardée and Façade), Antony Dyson (Enigma Variations and Monotones), and Brian Shaw (Les Patineurs and Rendezvous). Rights to most of his other ballets were left to his nephew, Anthony Russell-Roberts, who was Administrative Director of the Royal Ballet from 1983 to 2009.

To perpetuate the legacy of Ashton and his ballets, the Frederick Ashton Foundation was set up in 2011. It is independent of, but works closely with, the Royal Ballet.

== Honours ==
Ashton was appointed Commander of the Order of the British Empire (CBE) in the 1950 Birthday Honours, knighted in the 1962 Birthday Honours, appointed Companion of Honour (CH) in the 1970 Birthday Honours for services to the ballet, and appointed to the Order of Merit (OM) in 1977.

His honours from other countries included the Legion of Honour (France, 1960) and the Order of the Dannebrog (Denmark, 1964). He received the Queen Elizabeth II Coronation Award from the Royal Academy of Dance in 1959. He was awarded the Freedom of the City of London (1981), and received honorary doctorates from the universities of Durham (1962), East Anglia (1967), London (1970), Hull (1971) and Oxford (1976).

== Notes, references and sources ==
=== Sources ===
- Dominic, Zoë; Gilbert, John Selwyn (1971). Frederick Ashton: a Choreographer and his Ballets. London: Harrap. ISBN 024550351X.
- Ford, Boris (1992). Modern Britain. Cambridge: Cambridge University Press. ISBN 0521428890.
- Genné, Beth. "My Dearest Friend, My Greatest Collaborator – Ashton, Fedorovitch and Symphonic Variations". In Jordan & Grau (1996).
- Greskovic, Robert (2002). Ballet 101. London: Turnaround. ISBN 0786881550.
- Haltrecht, Montague (1975). The Quiet Showman: Sir David Webster and the Royal Opera House. London: Collins. ISBN 0002111632.
- Jacobs, Laura (2006). Landscape with Moving Figures – A Decade on Dance. New York: Dance & Movement Press. ISBN 1597910015.
- Jordan, Stephanie; Grau, Andrée, eds. (1996). Following Sir Fred's Steps: Ashton's Legacy. London: Dance Books. ISBN 1852730471. Archived from the original on 14 February 2006.
- Kaplan, Fred (1999). Gore Vidal : A Biography. New York: Doubleday. ISBN 0385477031.
- Parry, Jann (2010). Different Drummer – The Life of Kenneth MacMillan. London: Faber and Faber. ISBN 978-0571243037.
- Vaughan, David (1999). Frederick Ashton and His Ballets (2nd ed.). London: Dance Books. ISBN 1852730625.
