= Skeaping =

Skeaping is a surname. Notable people with the surname include:

- Colin Skeaping (born 1944), British stuntman
- John Skeaping (1901–1980), British painter and sculptor
- Kenneth Mathiason Skeaping (1856–1946), English artist
- Lucie Skeaping, British singer, instrumentalist, broadcaster and writer
- Mary Skeaping (1902–1984), British ballerina and choreographer
- Roddy Skeaping, British composer
