= Michael Maule =

American ballet dancer and instructor (1921–2017)

- Born: 31 October 1921; Durban, South Africa
- Died: 15 March 2017 (aged 95)
- Occupations: Ballet dancer, instructor
- Dancing career
- Former groups: New York City Ballet; American Ballet Theatre; Cuban National Ballet; Metropolitan Opera Ballet; London Festival Ballet; Ballets U.S.A.

Michael Maule (31 October 1921 – 15 March 2017) was an American ballet dancer and instructor.

== Early life and training ==
Born in Durban, South Africa, Michael Maule was a descendant of Scottish immigrants who had settled in the province of Natal, on the Indian Ocean. His early training in ballet took place in Pietermaritzburg and Durban, first under Nancy Hooper-Graham and then, from age fourteen, under Eileen Keegan and Dorothea McNair, all teachers of the Cecchetti method. He left South Africa and moved to London in the late 1930s, when he was still a teenager. Upon the outbreak of World War II, he enlisted in the Royal Navy and served on sea duty for five years. When peace returned to Europe, he moved again, to New York City, where he resumed his ballet training with Vincenzo Celli, also a disciple of Enrico Cecchetti.

== Career ==
Once established in New York, Maule made his professional debut in the United States in the original Broadway production of Annie Get Your Gun (1946), a long-running hit starring Ethel Merman singing the songs of Irving Berlin. Maule remained with the show for an entire year, dancing the choreography of Helen Tamiris. Over the following two decades, his illustrious career included time served as principal dancer with the American Ballet Theatre (1947), the Cuban National Ballet (1948–1949), the New York City Ballet (1950–1953), Great Moments of Ballet (1954), and the London Festival Ballet (1955). He was a guest artist at the Jacob's Pillow Dance Festival in the summers of 1951, 1953, and 1954.

Maule was not a bravura dancer, but he possessed a sound classical technique, and his sturdy figure, pale complexion, and light red hair—added to his strong stage presence. Particularly noted for his gracious partnering, he often appeared as cavalier and partner to leading ballerinas of his day, including Maria Tallchief, Alicia Markova, Patricia Wilde, Alexandra Danilova, Alicia Alonso, Belinda Wright, and Marilyn Burr, among others.

With the New York City Ballet. Maule danced many works in the repertory choreographed by George Balanchine and Jerome Robbins. He originated roles in two major works by Robbins—the First Intruder in The Cage (1951) and one of the two Trumpets in Fanfare (1953)—and was a member of the original ensemble of Balanchine's Scotch Symphony (1952). On Broadway, he danced Balanchine's choreography again in the 1957 revival of The Merry Widow, partnering Mary Ellen Moylan.

In 1953, Maule was first choice for the role of Charlie Chisholm Dalrymple, the bridegroom in the movie version of Brigadoon (1954), a romantic fantasy of an enchanted village in the Scottish Highlands. His chance at Hollywood stardom came to naught, however, when he was replaced by Jimmy Thompson before filming started. On television, he danced on The Bell Telephone Hour in 1962 and on Camera Three in 1965. Subsequently, he choreographed ballets for Great Moments of Ballet and London Festival Ballet.

After retiring from the stage, Maule taught ballet technique in numerous schools and venues, including the American Ballet Theatre School, the Robert Joffrey School, and the National Academy of Dance in Champaign, Illinois, where he served as the first director of dance (1972–1976), having been recommended for the job by Margot Fonteyn. He also taught at the Juilliard School's Dance Division, at the Melissa Hayden studio, and in his own studio in an upper floor of Carnegie Hall. Abroad, he was an invited guest teacher at schools and studios in the United Kingdom, Sweden, the Netherlands, Japan, and the Philippines.

== Personal life ==
Maule became a permanent resident of the United States in 1956. For several years prior to his death he lived in Vero Beach, Florida, with his second wife, Katherine, who is the mother of ballet dancer John Gardner. He died on 15 March 2017 at the age of 95.
