= Mary Skeaping =

Ballet dancer, director, and producer

Mary Skeaping MBE
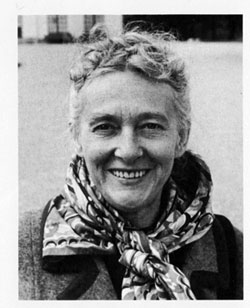
- Skeaping in Stockholm in 1953
- Born: Mary Emma Skeaping; 15 December 1902; Woodford, London, England
- Died: 9 February 1984 (aged 81); St Charles's Hospital, Kensington, London, England
- Occupations: Ballet dancer, director and producer
- Years active: 1925–1984
- Known for: Reconstructions of long-lost ballets

Mary Emma Skeaping MBE (15 December 1902 – 9 February 1984) was an English ballerina who is better known as a ballet teacher, director, choreographer, and producer. She served as director of the Royal Swedish Ballet in Stockholm for nine years (1953–1962), and became an international authority on ballet from the seventeenth to the nineteenth century.

== Biography ==
Skeaping was born at Woodford, Essex, on 15 December 1902, the youngest of the four children of Kenneth Mathiason Skeaping (13 December 1856 – 16 May 1946) (Note: His parents were the decorative wood carver Joseph Nairn Skeaping (baptised on 6 August 1829 – 1 January 1902) (Note: Joseph died at Rainhill Lunatic Asylum nine days after being admitted on 24 December 1901.) and Mary Pollock Mathiason (baptised on 24 May 1835 – 14 March 1917) Who had married at St. Philip's Church, Liverpool on 10 April 1853.) and Sarah Ann Skeaping née Rattenbury (2 January 1867 – second quarter 1960) (Note: Her parents were Thomas Swaine Rattenbury (6 June 1830 – 22 June 1877), a grocer and cheeses monger of New Cross. and grocer's shopwoman Sarah Rattenbury née Day (c. 1832 – 10 October 1898).)

Her three older siblings were:

- Kenneth Mathiason Skeaping (22 September 1897 – 14 October 1977), a musician and a leader and educator in early music. (Note: After his death, Early Music carried two pages of tributes to him from 11 different persons.)
- Sally Skeaping (13 August 1899 – 9 January 1916) who died of appendicitis and peritonitis (Note: Appendicitis can lead to Peritonitis if the appendix bursts.) at Guy's Hospital, London aged 16, in the presence of her mother. (Note: Skeaping deeply felt the death of her elder sister, who had been very interested in dance. She attributed her death in part to the delay in getting Sally to hospital due to the lack of motor transport during the war. Sally was buried near her home at Bexleyheath.)
- John Rattenbury Skeaping RA (9 June 1901 – 5 March 1980), sculptor. John would go on to marry artist Barbara Hepworth, making her Skeaping's sister-in-law.

The children had an unusual upbringing. They never attended school as children, (Note: In a 1978 interview, Skeaping told how the four children were going for a walk in the wood during what were school hours for other children when they were stopped by a truant office who enquired why they were not at school. Her eldest brother replied that they did not attend school. When the truant officer ungrammatically asked "who learns you then?", this proved the advantage to Skeaping of not attending school.) although Skeaping herself attended a convent school later on and got seven honours in the school leaving certificate. In a 1968 interview her brother John recalls her father as saying: ". . . two great qualities that children have are imagination and the power of imitation so the only things they should do is develop their imagination by learning music, dancing, painting, sculpture, and so forth an imitation - they can learn languages. What is stuffed into children against their will over ten years they can forget in six months. What you learn willingly over that ten years, you never forget."

When Skeaping was born the family lived at Kersal Villa, Malmsbury Road, South Woodford, Essex, quite close to Epping Forest, where the children went daily for walks with their father. Some normal childhood activities were forbidden, including football and cycling. In the home, the children were taught to read, grammar, and their tables, but no history or geography. What history Skeaping learned was from historical novels until she cycled daily to a convent school run by a French order of nuns, initially to learn French, but then to take the school leaving certificate. She was much older than the other pupils.

When Skeaping attended at a local dance class with her brother John and sister Sally, the instructor said that their mother should take them up to London for instruction. Eventually, Skeaping and Sally were taking lessons from the Italian Francesca dancer and mime Zanfretta in London, at a guinea a time, with the lessons being paid for by a wealthy man who was a client of their father. John had dropped out of dance lessons and was concentrating on art. (Note: John had a piano scholarship from age nine to eleven, before deciding to concentrate on art.) Their mother accompanied the Skeaping girls to the lessons and took notes to the annoyance of Zanfretta, who objected until their mother threatened to withdraw them altogether. They had a barre in their father's studio at home and practised there between lessons based on the notes taken by their mother. The outbreak of the First World War brought an end to the lessons.

Skeaping was still in Woodford in 1905, but had moved to Cliftonville, Warren Road, Bexleyheath, London, by the time of the 1911 census, and stayed there until at least 1918. By 1929 the electoral register shows Skeaping, living with her parents and eldest brother Kenneth at 2 Eton College Road (Note: This is nowhere near the famous Eton College, which has always been near Windsor in Berkshire.), in Camden, London. They were still there ten years later at the time of the 1939 Register in September of that year. (Note: She had just that morning returned from a visit to South Africa about the "Windsor Castle" of the Union-Castle Mail Steamship Company.) By 1951, Skeaping was living at 42a Craven Road, Paddington, London, which was to remain her London address for the next 33 years.

Skeaping died on 9 February 1984 at St Charles's Hospital, Kensington, London. Her estate was valued at £116,452. Her death was marked by obituaries in both The Times and The Stage.

== Work ==
Initially, Skeaping was training in music at the Royal College of Music where her eldest brother Kenneth was an associate and teacher. When she first auditioned for Pavlova in 1925, it was with the intention of dancing for a season and returning to the Royal College of Music.

While Skeaping's initial ballet training was with Francesca Zanfretta, she also studied with most of the great teachers of the era including Laurent Novikov, Leonide Massine, Seraphina Astafieva, Stanislas Idzikowski, Lubov Egorova, Vera Trefilova and Margaret Craske. Skeaping became a leading exponent of the Cecchetti method under the tutelage of Craske.

Skeaping toured as a dancer with Anna Pavlova's company for two seasons, 1925 and 1930–1931. She toured with the Nemchinova-Dolin company from c. 1927. (Note: The company was formed by Sir Anton Dolin and Vera Nemchinova.) She also performed with the Ballet Club, later known as the Rambert Dance Company from c. 1930. In the summer of 1930, Skeaping was one of six dancers selected by the Nemichova-Dolin company for a season in The Netherlands. (Note: One amusing facet of the season in the Netherlands was that one of the other five dancers was Elizabeth Hepworth, the younger sister of the sculptor Barbara Hepworth who was married to Skeaping's brother John. During the tour, Barbara abandoned the family home to run off with the painter Ben Nicholson, who was himself married at the time.)

Berry (who was Skeaping's assistant) describes Skeaping as a technically competent but uninspired dancer whose broad training and insatiable curiosity about all dance forms were an aid in the 1930s when she appeared in appeared in pantomime, (Note: Skeaping appeared as the Bird of Paradise in the seasonal pantomime at the Prince's Theatre, Bristol in December 1932.) music halls, (Note: Skeaping toured music halls with the Jimmy Nervo and Teddy Knox roadshow appearing in the Hippodrome, Liverpool in January, and twice nightly at the Portsmouth Hippodrome in May 1930.) and cabaret, as well as appearing in classical ballet. Browse said that Skeaping's "approach to her dancing was matter-of-fact and workmanlike but tinged with a wry bump of humour."

While her obituary in The Times states that Skeaping worked in South Africa during the Second World War, (Note: Some sources say that Skeaping was trapped in South Africa by the outbreak of war, and spent the war years there. Her obituary in The Stage states that she went to teach in South Africa during the Second World War. By contrast Steeh says that Skeaping was stranded in South America by the Second World War and spent her time teaching and giving recitals there, only returning to London in 1948.) she returned from there in September 1939, and spend the next three years touring the UK with Anna Ivanova of the Ballets Russes and performances as far afield as Perth, Scotland and St. Ives, Cornwall. Their intent was to bring professional performances to remote areas which never had the opportunity of seeing such. They then extended this to tours of the armed forces, and had performed in ships, in air-raid shelters, and in barracks and billets. In Summer 1942 they performed under the auspices of the Western Command#Second World War for the Auxiliary Territorial Service, Women's Auxiliary Air Force, anti-aircraft units and transport personnel. (Note: The first two of these were effectively the Army and Air service for women, while the second two had very large female contingents.) Skeaping was still working in England up to November 1942, when she performed in a concert at Cambridge in aid of the Civilian Nurses Air Raid Victims' Fund. Her obituary in The Stage states that she went to teach in South Africa during the Second World War, as does the Encyclopedia of Ballet. (Note: If true, and not just a reference to her presence in South Africa in 1939, this would account for the lack of mentions of Skeaping the British Newspaper Archive from the beginning of 1943 to the end of 1945.) Skeaping was definitely back in England in January 1946 as she gave a lecture at the Chichester Ballet Club in West Sussex then.

Skeaping came into her own only when she moved from performing into choreography and directing. She was, together with Anna Ivanova, a technical advisors for the film The Little Ballerina by Mary Field Productions. The film was made in the Nettlefold Studios between early December 1946 and late January 1947. It was released by The Rank Organisation in September 1947. This 61-minute drama for children was about a young girl who wants to win a place with the Sadlers Wells ballet. (Note: Kinematograph Weekly called it a "Refreshing light-hearted children's film concerning a young girl who overcomes the difficulties of everyday life in order to become a famous ballerina.")

Skeaping was ballet mistress for Sadlers Wells Ballet for three years from 1948–1951. In 1951 she was responsible for The Sleeping Beauty for the BBC, the first live transmission of a full-length classical ballet on television. This was not her first encounter with television. In 1933, she had danced in a television broadcast using the Baird process. She then made a two-year tour of the United States, Canada, and Cuba.

Skeaping's appointment as artistic director of the Royal Swedish Ballet of the Royal Swedish Opera in Stockholm in 1953 (Note: She had been a guest ballet mistress at the Royal Swedish Ballet in 1952.) was a turning point for the Royal Swedish Ballet. She established Stockholm as a world centre for the study of the dance styles of earlier centuries. She was assisted in this by her own collection of early works on dance, the archives of the Royal Library, and by the accidental preservation of the Drottningholm Court Theatre, (Note: The Drottningholm theatre was the only eighteenth-century perspective theatre still in use in the 1950s. It had been preserved accidentally through being used a granary and lumber room over time.) complete with working machinery, sets, andcostumes dating from the founding of the Ballet.

Nicholas states that the national treasure of the Royal Swedish Ballet resided "in the historical ballets, lovingly reconstructed at the eighteenth-century court theatre of Drottningholm." The first of these was Skeaping's Cupid out of his humour in 1956. This was based on a scenario from 1649. It was staged for the state visit by Queen Elizabeth II to Sweden in 1956. (Note: Skeaping's obituary in The Times incorrectly gives the date of the visit as 1965. However, Skeaping was no longer director of the Royal Swedish Ballet in 1965, and the state visits made by Queen Elizabeth II in 1965 were to Ethiopia and Germany, and the Queen saw the ballet during her 1956 state visit.)

Skeaping's term with the Royal Swedish Ballet established her as a leading authority on seventeenth-, eighteenth-, and nineteenth-century ballet. She used her knowledge of late sixteenth-century dance to choreograph a long and striking sequence for the film Anne of the Thousand Days (1970) in which Richard Burton played Henry VIII. Much of her work in Sweden was filmed for Swedish television. The findings of her research into early ballet in Sweden led to her monographBallet under the Three Crowns, (Dance Perspectives No 32., 1967), which was later expanded into two books published in Sweden. (Note: There was presumably Balett på Stockholmsoperan written with Anna Greta Ståhle in 1979, and Der Svenske hovbaletten with Ivo Cramér in 1893.) Skeaping was so impressed by Gennaro Magri's Trattato teorico-prattico di ballo (Naples, 1779) that she got the sponsorship of the Calouste Gulbenkian Foundation and The Radcliffe Trust (Note: The Radcliffe Trust is one of Britain's oldest charities, founded in 1714 by the will of Dr John Radcliffe. The Radcliffe Trust continues to administer his charitable bequest to this day through the support of Music and Heritage and Crafts) to translate it into English. She died before she could complete the work and it was finished by her assistant Irmgard Berry and was published in 1988.

In the 1960s Skeaping's work on early dance was the basis for the first two programmes of Ballet For All, the education section of England's Royal Ballet. This work gave Skeaping the chance to experiment in recreating the original choreography for Giselle, for which some sections of the original score had been lost. This led to the staging of her version of Giselle by the London Festival Ballet (Note: Now known as the English National Ballet) in 1971. This version of Giselle has been praised as capturing the Romantic style and being closest to the 1841 original. It brought her international acclaim, not only with audiences, but also with scholars of dance.

== Ballets directed by Skeaping ==
Berry lists the following ballets as being choreographed by Skeaping.

- 1953 Swan Lake (after Petipa, Ivanov: music by Tchaikovsky) with the Royal Swedish Ballet, Stockholm. Also staged by the Finnish National Opera and Ballet in 1953, by the Ballet Alicia Alonso in Cuba, 1954; and by the Bavarian State Opera Ballet, 1959.
- 1953 Giselle (after Petipa, Coralli, and Perrot: music by Adam) with the Royal Swedish Ballet, Stockholm. Also staged by the Ballet Alicia Alonso, Cuba in 1954, by Ballet Frankfurt in 1968, by London Festival Ballet in 1971, by The Göteborg Ballet, Sweden in 1977, and by the West Australian Ballet in 1984.
- 1955 The Sleeping Beauty (after Petipa: music by Tchaikovsky) with the Royal Swedish Ballet, Stockholm. Also staged by the Finnish National Opera and Ballet in 1955, by the American Ballet Theatre in 1976, and by Malmo Ballet in 1982.
- 1956 Cupid out of his Humour (music by Purcell), Royal Swedish Ballet, Drottningholm Court Theatre, Sweden.
- 1958 Coppelia (after Petipa, Cecchetti: music by Delibes); Royal Swedish Ballet, Stockholm.
- 1964 Atis and Camilla (music by Roman), Royal Swedish Ballet, Drottningholm Court Theatre, Sweden.
- 1965 The Return of Springtime (after F. Taglioni libretto: music by Bossi) with Ballet for All, London. Also staged by the Swedish Ballet in 1966.
- 1967 The New Narcissus (with Cramer: music by Dupuy) with the Drottningholm Ballet, Sweden.
- 1971 The Fishermen; or, The Girl from the Archipelago (with Cramer, after Antoine Bournonville libretto, 1789: music by Kraus) with the Royal Swedish Ballet, Drottningholm.
- 1976 La Dansomanie (with Cramer, after Gardel libretto, 1800: music by Mehul, arranged by Farncombe) with the Royal Swedish Ballet in Drottningholm.
- 1980 The False Phantom (with Cramer, after Terrade libretto) with the Cramer Ballet in Drottningholm.
- 1981 Harlequin's Death (with Cramer, after Terrade libretto: music by anonymous) with the Royal Swedish Ballet in Drottningholm.

== Awards ==
Skeaping received the following honours and awards:

- 1958 Skeaping was appointed a Member of the Order of the British Empire (MBE) in the 1958 Birthday Honours.
- 1961 The Order of Gustav Vasa in 1961, a former Swedish order of chivalry.
- 1971 The Carina Ari Medal for promoting the development of dance in Sweden.
- 1981 The Swedish King's Medal, the 8th size (31 mm diameter) with the bright blue ribbon. (Note: Note that The Oxford Dictionary of Dance gives the year of award of this medal as 1980, however the official list gives it as 1981.)
