= Eileen Keegan =

- Born: South Africa
- Died: October 22, 2000; South Africa
- Occupation(s): Ballet dancer and teacher

Eileen Keegan (died 22 October 2000, South Africa) was a South African ballet dancer and teacher. She initially trained in South Africa under Madge Mann and Nancy Hooper, before moving to London in 1932 to continue her training. She toured Europe with Molly Lake's company and went on a global tour with Dandre's Ballet Company. She qualified as a Cecchetti examiner after being examined by Cyril Beaumont. In 1936 she returned to South Africa to teach. She ran her own studio, with Dorothea McNair, opposite the old Theatre Royal in Durban before moving to Kloof. She taught in her private studio for over 50 years. She gave recitals in the Durban City Hall and in 1939 presented the first locally produced season of ballet in the city. In 1940 she formed Durban's highly successful Ballet Club, which was based on the concept of the club begun by Dulcie Howes in Cape Town. Her notable pupils include: Nadia Nerina, Michael Maule, Joy Shearer, Colleen Scott, and Judy Gale-Brown. She died at her home on 22 October 2000.
