= Vincenzo Celli =

American ballet dancer (1900–1988)

- Born: Vincenzo Yacullo; 4 May 1900; Salerno, Italy
- Died: 28 February 1988 (aged 87); Greenwich, Connecticut, US
- Occupation: Dancer
- Spouse: Marion Ivell

Vincenzo Celli (4 May 1900 – 28 February 1988) was an American ballet dancer, choreographer, and teacher. He was known as a performer and choreographer in Italy, and in the US as a teacher of the Cecchetti method of ballet training.

== Early life and training ==
Vincenzo Celli, born as Vincenzo Yacullo in Salerno, Italy, emigrated with his parents to Chicago, Illinois, at an early age. He was first exposed to ballet as a teenager and was awed by the movements of dancer Vaslav Nijinsky, whom he saw perform in 1916 during an American tour of the Ballets Russes, under the direction of Sergei Diaghilev. He was deeply moved by the Russian ballet. "I didn't know what it was," he once said in an interview, "but I knew it was great."

At 17, Celli moved to New York City, where he performed as an actor both on and off Broadway with the Washington Square Players. Impressed by his range and ease of movement, choreographer Adolph Bolm approached him to appear in a mime role in his ballet production of Le Coq d’Or (1918) at the Metropolitan Opera. He then appeared in Bolm's production of The Birthday of the Infanta (1919) at the Chicago Opera. A few years later, Celli moved back to Italy, where he began formal ballet training with Rafaele Grassi, the teacher of Rosina Galli. He made his Italian debut in a 1922 revival of Manzotti's spectacular ballet Excelsior at Milan's Teatro dal Verme. The success of his appearance led to a contract with the Teatro alla Scala, where he studied privately under the famed choreographer and dancer Enrico Cecchetti.

== Career ==
Celli spent the next fifteen years, from 1923 to 1938, dancing at La Scala. Under the tutelage of maestro Cecchetti, from 1923 to 1928, he developed into an acclaimed virtuoso, eventually earning the prestigious title of primo ballerino. During his years at Milan's famed opera and ballet theater, he formed an exciting partnership with prima ballerina Cia Fornaroli (1888-1954), appearing with her in such ballets as Petrouchka in 1927 and La Leggenda di Giuseppi (The Legend of Joseph) in 1928. He also began to choreograph, creating ballets for dozens of operas before he decided to leave Italy, where his position was endangered because of his refusal to join the Fascist party.

Upon returning to the US in the late 1930s, Celli abandoned his performing career in favor of teaching. He toured for several seasons (1938-1940) as guest teacher with the Ballet Russe de Monte Carlo and then opened a studio on Manhattan's West Side and began a highly successful private teaching career. Teaching ballet technique would occupy him for the next forty years. His classes adhered strictly to the Cecchetti system, which he regarded as the foundation of a complete dance education. Among his pupils were Agnes de Mille, Alicia Markova, Anton Dolin, Jerome Robbins, Alicia Alonso, Katherine Rutgers, Royes Fernandez, Richard Thomas, and Harvey Hysell.

In an article published in 1944, Celli stressed the importance of rigorous training: "In all arts success depends upon and demands considerable work. Dancers cannot permit themselves any indolence if they wish to conserve their hard-won accomplishments. They should exercise daily . . . under the eye of an experienced authority. Just as a great pianist must practice scales in order to execute a concerto, so a dancer must devote himself to the basic technique of ballet in order to continue his mastery of it before the public."

Celli and Margaret Craske, who taught at the Metropolitan Opera Ballet School, were both exponents of the Cechetti method. He acknowledged her training, but he always considered himself the leading American authority on the Cechetti system. He was often referred to as "the son of Cecchetti," as he was the last of his favored private pupils. In 1946, he contributed a lengthy biographical essay on Cecchetti to an issue of Dance Index honoring the maestro.

== Personal life ==
Celli married American mezzo-soprano Marion Ivell not long after her retirement from the opera stage in 1925. They shared an apartment in the famed Ansonia Hotel on Manhattan's West Side until her death in 1969. Two decades later, in 1988, he died of a heart attack while visiting a friend in Greenwich, Connecticut. His papers, containing address books, journals, correspondence, poems, scrapbooks, and photographs, were deposited in the Jerome Robbins Dance Division of the New York Public Library at Lincoln Center, where they are available for public inspection.
