= Stanislas Idzikowski =

Polish ballet dancer (1894–1977)

Stanislas Idzikowski (1894 – 12 February 1977) was a Polish dancer and ballet master, active in England, and with such historic companies as Pavlova's, Ballets Russes, and Vic-Wells. During his performance career, 1910-1933, he became famous for his brilliant classical technique, and for the development of ballet roles. With Beaumont he co-authored an influential book on the Cecchetti Method, still in print. He later taught dance in London.

== His start in ballet: Warsaw to London ==
Born in Warsaw Stanisław Idzikowski at the age of ten began his formal dance training, at the ballet school of the Wielki Theatre in his native city. Among his early instructors was the Italian dancer and teacher Enrico Cecchetti, who would later prove important for his professional life. He also studied with Stanislav Gilbert and Anatole Vilzak. Auguste Berger a Bohemian then instructed him which led to his stage debut in Ali Baba, a ballet divertissement.

When Idzikowski was sixteen, he relocated to England, and Anglicized his given name Stanisław to Stanislas. His performing career in London's West End then began, doing musical and ballet productions, e.g., The Belle of New York in 1911. He danced in the touring company of Russian ballet star Anna Pavlova in 1912. He traveled to Lausanne in 1914 where he met the impresario Sergei Diaghilev. Cecchetti then recommended him for the Ballets Russes; he soon became a leading dancer.

== In Diaghilev's Ballets Russes ==
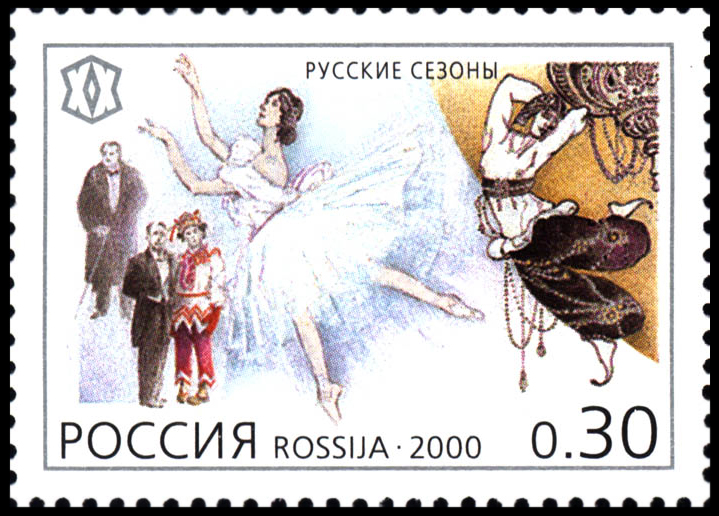
Diaghilev's Ballets Russes, Russian stamp. Idzikowski danced here, 1914-1924, 1925-1929.

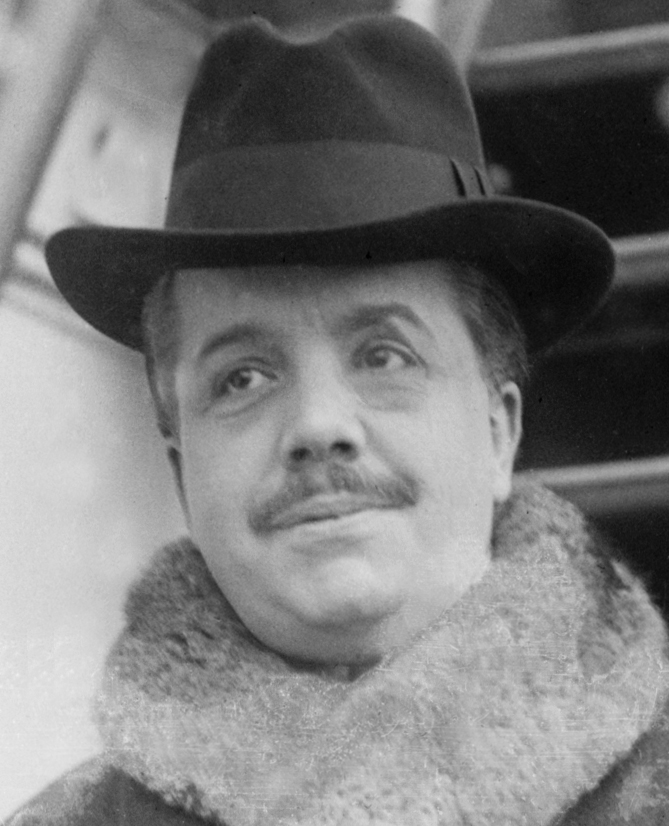
Diaghilev 1872-1929.

A small, muscular man, Idzikowski had developed a strong classical ballet technique and was capable of performing virtuosic feats. With the Diaghilev company, he first assumed roles made famous by Vaslav Nijinsky, its former star performer and a world celebrity. Thus, in choreographer Michel Fokine's ballets Idzikowski danced: the role of Harlequin in Le Carnaval; in Petrushka, the title role; and in Le Spectre de la Rose, the Spirit.

Yet their interpretive approach could differ. As Harlequin, Nijinsky expressed a "spirit of subtle mockery and cynical worldly wisdom". While Idzikowski, according to Beaumont, danced the part with a "mischievous certainty, but always good natured".

These roles "previously seemed the particular property of that great genius Nijinsky. Few things are more unnerving to a dancer than to execute a dance which the public is accustomed to see performed by someone else."

Idzikowshi was particularly celebrated for his phenomenal elevation and dazzling batterie. As before him Cecchetti in 1890, and Nijinsky in 1907, Idzikowski in 1921 performed as the Blue Bird in the pas de deux from The Sleeping Beauty of Tchaikovsky. "[His] most famous role was the Blue Bird in The Sleeping Princess of 1921" premiering in London.

Possessed of a strong sense of comedy and drama, he also became known for the character roles he created in the ballets of Léonide Massine, including the role of the Cat in Kikimora (1916), Battista in Les Femmes de Bonne Humeur (1917), the Spark (Dandy) in Le Tricorne (1919), the Snob in La Boutique Fantasque (1919), and Corviello in Pulcinella (1920). Among his other original roles was the Cock on his perch in Le Renard (1923), choreographed by Bronislava Nijinska.

Having briefly left Ballets Russes in 1924, Idzikowski in 1925 rejoined the company. He danced with Alexandra Danilova in its production of Jack in the Box, with music by the late Erik Satie, choreography by George Balanchine. When Sergei Diaghilev unexpectedly died in 1929, however, the ballet world lost not only the gifted impresario, but also his company as "the Ballets Russes collapsed".

== Soirées de Paris, Vic-Wells, other posts ==
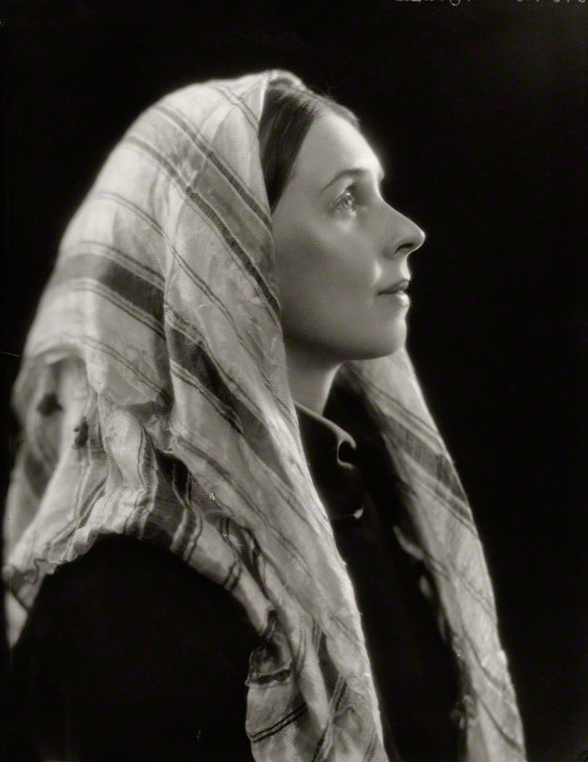
Lydia Lopokova in 1922

In 1924, both on leave from Ballets Russes, Idzikowski appeared with his frequent dance partner Lydia Lopokova at the London Coliseum. She also was drawn to Soirées de Paris, a new dance enterprise organized by Étienne de Beaumont. It was a potential competitor of Diaghilev. "Artistic considerations" caused Lopokova to respond "with enthusiasm to Massine's offer of a place in his new company." Idzikowski also signed. Massine at Soirée de Paris wrote choreography for new ballets, including Mercure. Picasso designed decor. Staged in Paris, it was the Soirée's first and only season.

"As a guest artist with the Vic‐Wells Ballet in the early 1930s, Mr. Idzikowski lent the prestige of his name to the struggling young company that is now Britain's Royal Ballet." He developed the lead male role in Les Rendezvous, a ballet-divertissement choreographed by Ashton, mounted in 1933. "The leading pair of 'lovers' was performed by Alicia Markova and Stanislas Idzikowski." The Vic-Wells company was directed by de Valois, an 'alumnus' of Ballets Russes. For Vic-Wells, Idzikowski also performed his well-known Blue Bird role in the revised, one-act Aurora's Wedding, and his Harlequin in Carnaval.

From 1928 to 1930 Idzikowski had managed and directed his own ballet company. He later associated with the commercial production of films: The Gods Go a-Begging (1934), Carnival (1935), and Peg of Old Drury (1935). For several years starting in 1939, Idzikowski served as ballet master for Mona Inglesby's International Ballet.

== Book with Beaumont on Cecchetti ==
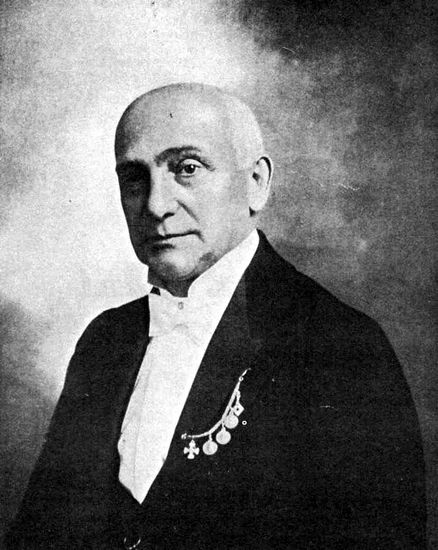
Cecchetti, c.1900

In 1918 Enrico Cecchetti (1850-1928), by then a renowned dancer, ballet master and pedagogue, opened a school in London. Idzikowski, his former student, joined a group of friends and associates in strongly advocating his 'Russo-Italian' method of training students. At Cecchetti's urging, Idzikowski then started to work with the maestro, and later with the balletomane Cyril W. Beaumont, to preserve and codify the Cecchetti method of teaching. Until then it had been largely developed and handed down orally.

Demonstration of basic positions and exercises were made by Cecchetti and by Idzikowski, with commentary, which were then drawn by Randolph Schwabe and reduced by Beaumont to a written text. The collaboration resulted in the co-authorship by Beaumont and Idzikowski of a technical manual, completed in 1922.

"[E]ach pupil is constructed differently, both physically and temperamentally, so that each requires adaptations of the lesson in order to supply his own particular needs."

"What then ar the qualifications of an experienced professor? First, his school-the sources of his own knowledge. Second, his reputation as a teacher and his distinction as a dancer. Third, his personal qualities; he should be conscientious, patient, and a good disciplinarian. Fourth, his capacity both as a practical demonstrator and theoretical exponent. ..."

"[A]s your experience increases, you may with advantage study the sister arts of mime, music, painting, drawing, and sculpture. ... Seek to discover why these works afford your pleasure. Thus you will learn what is meant by grace and beauty. Endeavor to apply these same principles to your own art."

Later, the London dancer Celia Franca became a dance student of Idzikowsky. Franca became the first artistic director of the National Ballet of Canada and co-founded the National Ballet School of Canada; both institutions use the Cecchetti method. In 1922 Beaumont moved to found the Cecchetti Society, which merged with the ISTD in 1924.

== As ballet teacher in London ==
Acting as ballet master he had instructed performers in various ballet companies. From 1933 he had taught, eventually from his own dance studio in London. There he was accompanied on piano by his longtime partner Wanda Evina (1891-1966). Since 1916 they had been romantically linked. Evina was British, a professional dancer, and an accomplished pianist. He worked also with the Royal Academy of Dance.

Among his students was Margot Fonteyn. She remembered him as a guest teacher during her early years at Sadler's Wells under Ninette de Valois, which would have been in the mid 1930s:

"My favorite was Stanislas Idzikowski, affectionately known as Idzi, a brilliant dancer who had been with the Diaghilev Ballet. He was diminutive, dapper, and precise, speaking rather good English with a clipped Polish accent. Severe but never unkind, he knew exactly what he expected of his students and explained clearly how to achieve it."

He married Sally Wheeler from Horsham (1890-1973) in January 1939 at Wandsworth.They did not have any children.

Following the death of Madame Evina, he retired from ballet at age 72.

== Descriptions of Idzikowski ==
"He is quiet, though animated in conversation, but moody and sensitive in the highest degree." "In stature he is short... . His torso and limbs are those of an athlete. The muscular development of his calves and thighs is extraordinary. ... [His] cheek bones high... , wavy hair... almost white... , [with] deep set, blue eyes."

"He taught class in a suit with the stiff color, the vest, and spats and street shoes. With all this, he could still do a double tour en l'air and land in a perfect fifth."

"How describe those difficult steps performed with an ease which makes them appear elementary to the ordinary spectator, while the professional onlooker, swayed between astonishment and rapture, can scarce believe the evidence of his eyes."

== Images on-line ==
The Art of Stanislas Idzikowsky (London 1926) is a thin volume published in a limited edition of 350 copies, with six visual art works, twelve photographs, and five pages of text. Before the title page comes Glyn Philpot's monochrome portrait. The text by Cyril W. Beaumont then describes Idzikowski in various roles and as a presence in ballet. A sketch by Randolph Schwabe is of the dancer in costume, seated in his dressing room. Following are four color images of Idzikowski in ballet poses, reproductions of paintings by Vera Willoughby. Lastly, the twelve publicity photographs are of him in various costumes of his choreographed roles.

A brief {1:32}, low quality video of Idzikowski and Lydia Lopokova exists. The two were often paired. Here they are in costume as the Harlequin and Columbine in the ballet Le Carnaval. Lopokova was married to John Maynard Keynes, the English economist.

== Bibliography ==
=== Primary ===
- Cyril W. Beaumont, The Art of Stanislas Idzikowski (London: Beaumont Press, 1926).
  - Lynn Garafola, "Idzikowski, Stanislas" in International Encyclopedia of Dance, edited by Selma Jeanne Cohen, et al. (New York: Oxford University Press, 1998), at v.3, pp. 441–442.
  - Horst Koegler, "Idzikowski, Stanislas" in The Concise Oxford Dictionary of Ballet (Oxford University Press, 1977), at p. 269.
  - Carmen Paris & Javier Bayo, "Idzikovsky, Stanislas (1894-1977)", in MCNBiografías. Accessed 2018-4-6.
  - Obituary, "Stanislas Idzikowski, 82, Ballets Russes dancer", in The New York Times, February 16, 1977. Retrieved 2 April 2017.

Co-author

- Cyril W. Beaumont and Stanislas Idzikowski, A Manual of the Theory and Practice of Classical Theatrical Dancing (Cecchetti Method) (London: Beaumont Press 1922, rev. ed. 1932), Preface by Enrico Cecchetti. Reissued as The Cecchetti Method of Classical Ballet: Theory and Technique (Mineola: Dover Publications 2003).

=== Secondary ===
- Nancy Van Norman Baer, Bronislava Nijinska. A dancer's legacy (Fine Arts Museum of San Francisco 1986).
- George Balanchine, Balanchine's Complete stories of the great ballets (New York: Doubleday 1954).
- Margot Fonteyn, Margot Fonteyn: Autobiography (New York: Knopf 1975, 1976),
- Lynn Garafola, Diaghilev's Ballets Russes (Oxford University 1989).
- Lynn Garafola, Legacies of Twentieth Century Dance (Wesleyan University 2005).
- Robert Grekovic, Ballet. A complete guide (London: Robert Hale 2000).
- Jennifer Homans, Apollo's Angels. A history of ballet (New York: Random House 2010).
- Boris Kochno, Diaghilev and the Ballets Russes (New York: Harper and Row 1970).
- Léonide Massine, My Life in Ballet (London: Macmillan 1968).
- Bronislava Nijinska, Early Memoirs (New York: Holt Rinehart Winston 1982).
- Richard Shead, Ballets Russes (Secaucus: Wellfleet Press 1989).
- Lydia Sokolova, Dancing for Diaghilev. Memoirs (London: John Murray 1960, reprint San Francisco 1989), edited by Robert Buckle.
  - Kay Ambrose with Celia Franca, The Ballet-Student's Primer (New York: Knopf 1954, 1974).
  - Gail Grant, Technical manual and dictionary of classical ballet (New York: Kamin Dance Pub. 1950, 3rd ed. Dover 1982).
- Lynn Garafola and Nancy Van Norman Baer, editors, Ballets Russes and its World (Yale University Press 1999).

=== External links ===
- The Art of Stanislas Idzikowski (London: C. W. Beaumont 1926). Retrieved 2 April 2017.
- "Stanislas Idzikowski, 82, Ballets (R)usses dancer", obituary in The New York Times, February 16, 1977. Retrieved 2 April 2017.
- "Stanislas Idzikowski (1894-1977)" in Oxford Reference. Retrieved 2 April 2017.
- "Stanislas Idzikowsky" at Cecchetti International Classical Ballet: Pioneers. Retrieved 13 March 2015.
- "Stanislas Idzikowski, the forgotten dancer" by David Adams. Retrieved 2 April 2017.
- "Stanislas Idzikowski" at IMDb. Retrieved 2 April 2017.
  - "Cyril Beaumont" at Cecchetti International Classical Ballet: Pioneers. Retrieved 26 July 2017.
  - "Enrico Cecchetti" at Cecchetti International Classical Ballet: About. Retrieved 26 July 2017.
  - "Mona Inglesby", obituary in The Independent, 12 Oct. 2006. Retrieved 24 July 2017.
- "Ballet - Stanislas Idzikowski and Diaghilev's Ballet" at Bonhams (2005). Retrieved 2 April 2017.
- The Balanchine Catalogue, George Balanchine Foundation. Retrieved 13 March 2015.
- "Ballets Russes on Film - Lydia Loupokova and Stanislas Idzikowski, Le Carnaval", JRH Films at YouTube.com. Retrieved 2 April 2017.
- "Idzikowski as woodcarver", JRH Films at YouTube.com. Retrieved 4 February 2019.
