= Randolph Schwabe =

English painter (1885-1948)

- Born: 9 May 1885; Eccles, Greater Manchester, England
- Died: 19 September 1948 (aged 63); Helensburgh, Scotland
- Education: Royal College of Art; Slade School of Art; Académie Julian
- Known for: Painting, drawing

Randolph Schwabe (9 May 1885 – 19 September 1948) was a British draughtsman, painter and etcher. He was the Slade Professor of Fine Art at University College London from 1930 until 1948. He served as a war artist in both World Wars, created designs for theatrical productions and illustrated a number of books.

== Early life ==
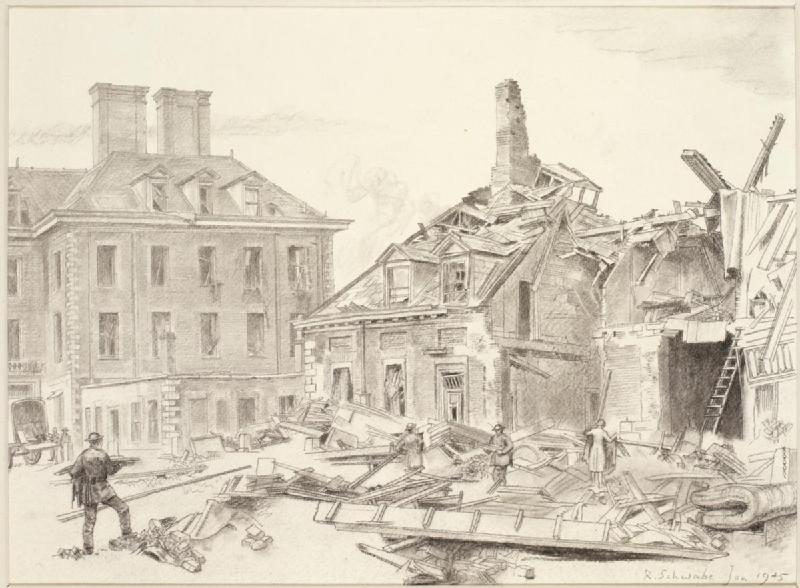
V2 Damage at the Chelsea Pensioners' Hospital London, SW3 (Art.IWM ART LD 4807)

Schwabe was born in Eccles, Greater Manchester, the youngest of two sons to Octavie Henriette Ermen and Lawrence Schwabe, a cotton merchant whose father had emigrated from Germany in 1820. The family moved several times before settling in Hemel Hempstead, Hertfordshire, where Lawrence Schwabe opened a printing and stationery business. Randolph was educated at a private school in Hemel Hempstead and from an early age showed a talent for drawing. In 1899, aged fourteen, he was enrolled at the Royal College of Art but was unhappy there and within a few months had transferred to the Slade School of Fine Art. In 1904 Schwabe won a Slade Scholarship and in 1905 won the college Summer Competition Prize. In 1906, a Slade scholarship allowed him to study at the Académie Julian in Paris before travelling to Italy in 1908. Working in Rome and Florence he gained a deep knowledge of Italian art and architecture. Work by Schwabe was shown at the New English Art Club in 1909 and he became a member in 1917, having become a member of the London Group in 1915. In April 1913 Schwabe married Gwendolen Jones and they were to have one daughter.

== Career ==
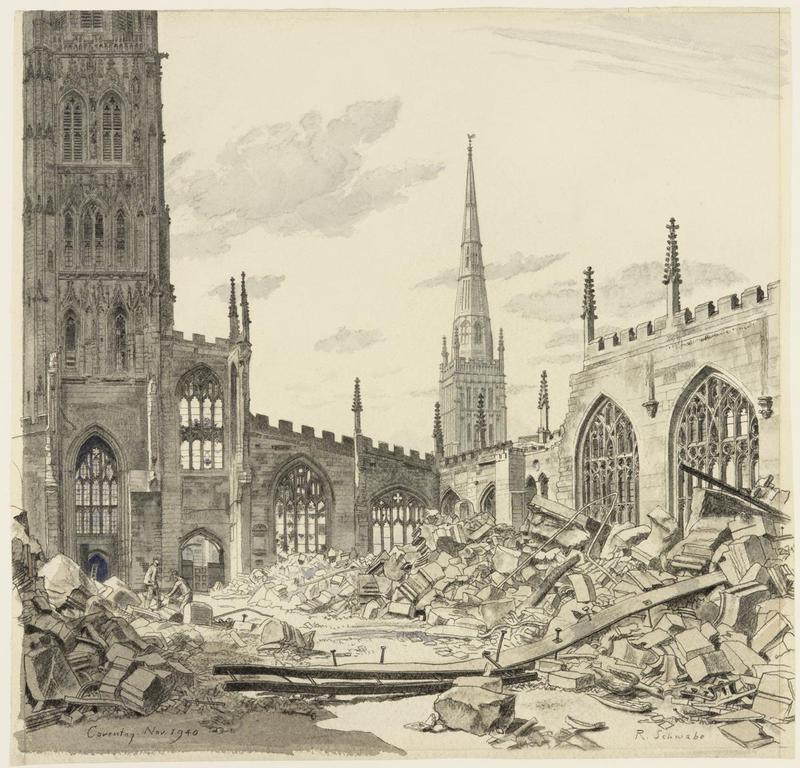
Coventry Cathedral, November 1940 (Art.IWM ART LD 709)

During the First World War, Schwabe served as an official war artist, as poor health had prevented him enlisting, and he mainly produced paintings and drawings of the work done by the Women's Land Army. After the war he began to teach at both the Camberwell School of Art and the Westminster School of Art. In 1930 he succeeded Henry Tonks as Slade Professor of Fine Art at University College and as Principal of the Slade School of Fine Art.

Schwabe's work was widely exhibited and he also created designs for theatrical productions and illustrated a number of books, including Historic Costume (1925) and A Short History of Costume and Armour (1931), both with F. M. Kelly. Other books illustrated by Schwabe included Crossings (1921) by Walter de la Mare, The Tinkers of Elstow (1946) by H E Bates and several books by the dance historian Cyril W. Beaumont. As well as illustrating several books for the Beaumont Press, Schwabe also designed a set of wooden figures based on dancers from the Sergei Diaghilev company, the Ballets Russes for Beaumont.

In 1941 Schwabe joined the committee of the War Artists' Advisory Committee and was also given a short commission to produce pieces for their collection. This included a commission to record the bomb damage to Coventry Cathedral in November 1940. In 1942 Schwabe was elected a member of the Royal Society of Painters in Watercolours, having been elected an associate of the Society in 1938. A columnist for the Chicago Daily Tribune nominated Schwabe for a Pulitzer Prize in 1943 for his cover illustration to The Old Churches of London by Gerald Cobb but had to write to the book's publishers to explain that he had been humorous as no such prize existed.

Although he remained Principal of the Slade, he moved to Helensburgh in Dunbartonshire for health reasons and he died there in September 1948.

== Legacy ==
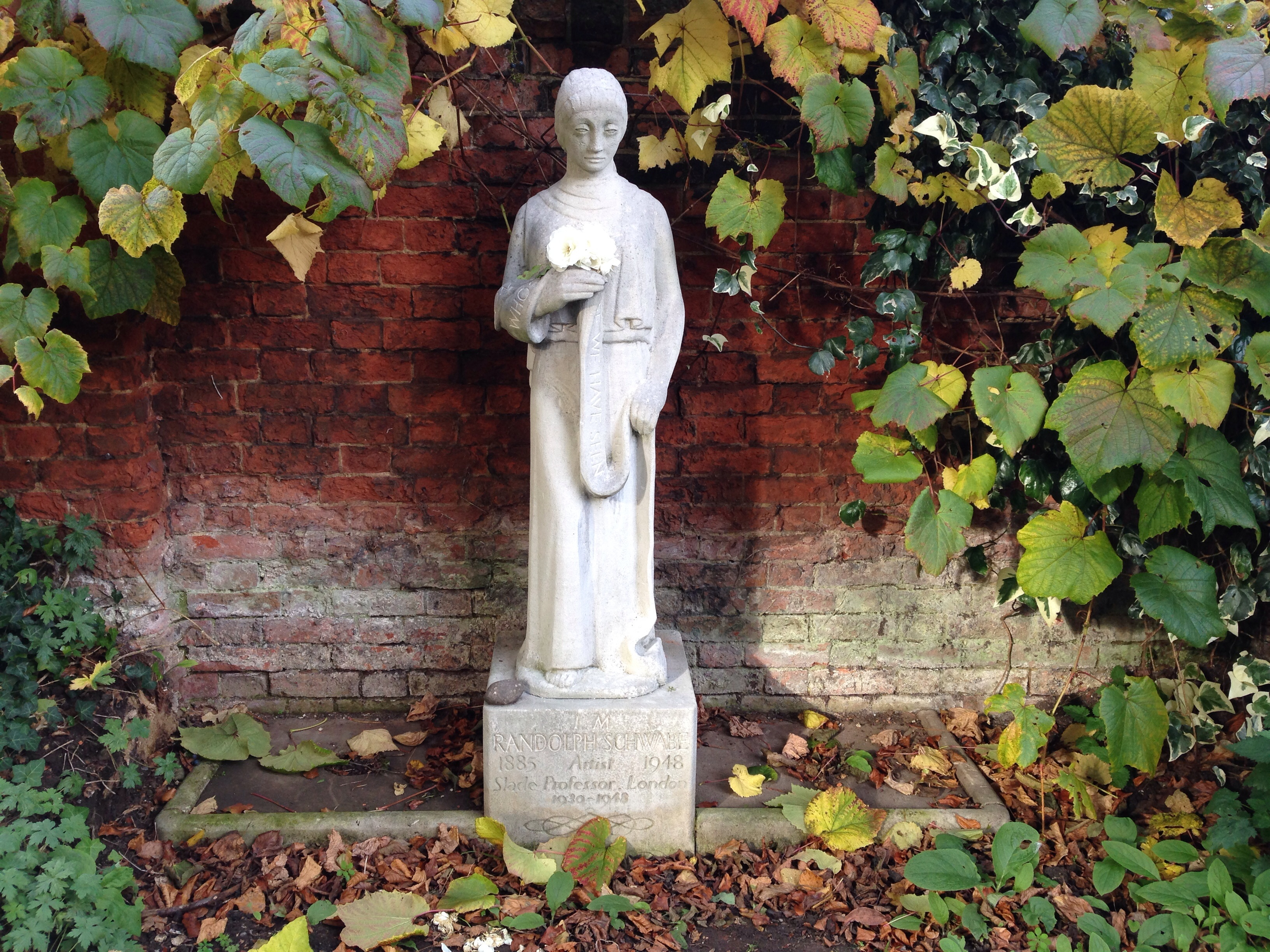
Schwabe's grave at St John-at-Hampstead in October 2016

Works by Schwabe are held in several major collections; the Imperial War Museum has examples of his war-time commissions from both the First and Second World Wars. The Arts Council toured a major retrospective of his work in 1951. Schwabe's ashes are interred in the churchyard of St John-at-Hampstead in Hampstead, over which stands a small statue of an angel by the sculptor Alan Durst. The angel wears a sash with the legend, Randolph Schwabe in whose life we have seen excellence in beauty.

== Books illustrated ==
Books illustrated by Schwabe included

- Crossings by Walter de la Mare, Beaufort Press, 1921
- A Manual of the Theory and Practice of Classical Theatrical Dancing by C. W. Beaumont, Beaumont Press, 1922
- After Berneval Letters of Oscar Wilde and Robert Ross by Oscar Wilde, Beaumont Press, 1922
- To Nature by Edmund Blunden, Beaumont Press, 1923
- The Café Royal by A. Symons, Beaumont Press, 1923
- Madrigals and Chronicles by J. Claire, Beaumont Press, 1924
- Masks of Time, Edmund Blunden, Beaumont Press, 1925
- Historic Costume 1490–1790 by F. M. Kelly, Batsford, 1925
- The Carwen Press Almanack, 1926
- The Actor by R.Lloyd, Beaumont Press, 1926
- The First Score by C. W. Beaumont, Beaumont Press, 1927
- The Wet Flanders Plain by H. Williamson, Beaumont Press, 1929
- The Theory and Practice of Allegro in Classical Ballet by C. W. Beaumont, Beaumont Press, 1930
- A Summer Fancy, Edmund Blunden, Beaumont Press, 1930
- A Short History of Costume and Armour 1066-1800 by F. M. Kelly, Batsford, 1931
- To Themis by Edmund Blunden, Beaumont Press, 1931
- Of Human Bondage by W. Somerset Maugham, Heinemann, 1936
- The Tinkers of Elstow by H. E. Bates, privately published, 1946
- English Church Monuments by Katharine Esdaile, Batsford, 1946
