= Margot Werner =

Austrian ballet dancer, singer, actress (1937–2012)

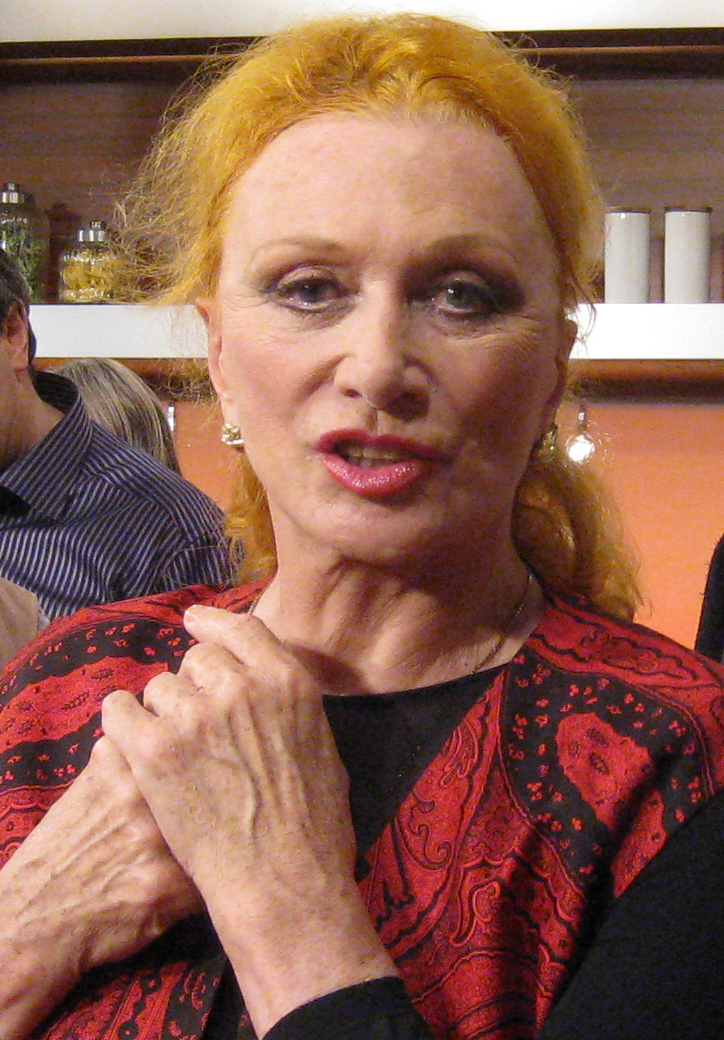

Background information
- Born: 8 December 1937; Salzburg, Austria
- Died: 1 July 2012 (aged 74); Munich, Germany
- Genres: Chanson

Margot Werner (8 December 1937 – 1 July 2012) was an Austrian ballet dancer, chanson singer, and actress. During her career, she was both the principal dancer at the Bavarian State Ballet, and a soloist at the Bavarian State Opera and Munich Philharmonic. She released several albums, and is best known for her 1977 hit, "So ein Mann" ("That Kind of Man"). Werner performed in a number of television shows and films, and in the 1970s had her own television show, The Margot Werner Show.

== Early life ==
Werner was born in Salzburg. Her father was a merchant, and her mother was a concert pianist.

== Career ==
=== Ballet ===
Werner began training in ballet at the age of five, with the children's ballet of the Bavarian State Opera, and performed in productions of Hansel and Gretel, A Midsummer Night's Dream, and Rosenkavalier. At 16, she was engaged as a ballet dancer with the Bavarian State Ballet, and became their principal dancer, or prima ballerina at the age of 20. She initially trained with Friderica Derra de Moroda at the Salzburg Landestheater and later studied with Margot Fonteyn, Svetlana Beriosova and Beryl Grey, and worked with a number of significant choreographers and conductors in the period, including John Neumeier and Leonard Bernstein. Werner performed frequently with her long-term dance partner, Heinz Bosl, until his death from leukemia at the age of 28.

=== Music ===
Werner was also a chanson singer, and released a number of albums. She is best known for her performance of "So ein Mann" ("That Kind of Man") from the album Wasser, Feuer, Luft und Erde, which was a hit in 1977. Her first album, Und für jeden kommt der Tag, was released in 1974 by Deutsche Grammafon. She had an annual chanson performance at the Renitenz Theater in Stuttgart, and also performed at the New York Metropolitan Opera Ball. She was a soloist who performed with the Munich Philharmonic Orchestra, Munich State Opera, and the Stuttgart Liederhalle. Werner also performed songs especially composed for her by composer Bert Grund in 1972. Towards the end of her career, Werner performed as a singer and entertainer on cruise ships.

=== Acting ===
In the 1970s, Werner made appearances in a number of Austrian and German television shows and films as a dancer and singer. Her performances on film and television were produced in collaboration with several well-known choreographers and dancers, including Alan Carter, Harald Lander, Birgit Culberg, Heinz Roses, Anton Tudor, George Balanchine and Hans van Manen. She later starred in two television shows of her own, The Margot Werner Show and Margot bis Montag.

She made her film debut in 1963, in Weekend in Schwarz-Weiss, but is best known for her performance in the 1976 film Dear Fatherland Be at Peace. Werner received a Golden Europe Award for new performer for this film, and the film itself received the German Film Award. She also performed in Bomber & Paganini (1976) and Liebt diese Erde (1984).

=== Awards ===
During her career, Werner received the Schwabing Arts Award and the Trude Hesterberg Ring.

== Personal life and death ==
Werner initially married the German actor, Peter Pasetti, but they were later divorced. She married Jochen Litt in 1978, and divided her time between a hotel he owned in the Tyrol, and Munich. In 2003, Werner invested a significant part of her own wealth into Litt's hotel, but the business failed, resulting in Werner's bankruptcy. Werner died at the age of 74, after falling from the third floor of Munich's Bogenhausen Hospital, where she was being treated for nerve damage in her shoulder. The cause of her death was later confirmed as suicide.
