= Cyril W. Beaumont =

British dance historian

Cyril W. Beaumont OBE
- Born: Cyril William Beaumont; 1 November 1891; London, England
- Died: 24 May 1976 (aged 84)
- Occupations: Dance historian; critic; technical theorist; translator; bookseller; publisher

Cyril W. Beaumont OBE (1 November 1891 – 24 May 1976) was a British dance historian, critic, technical theorist, translator, bookseller, and publisher. Author of more than forty books on ballet, he is considered one of the most important dance historians of the twentieth century.

== Biography ==
Cyril William Beaumont was born in London, brought up in a cultivated, middle-class family, and educated at local schools. As a youth, his parents directed him toward a career as a research chemist, but he was not a good student. Interested in theatre history, languages, and fine books, he abandoned his scientific studies to pursue a career in bookselling. In 1910, when he was nineteen, his father bought a small shop at 75 Charing Cross Road, in central London, and set him up in business as a seller of literary classics and rare books. There, he was introduced to dance by Alice Mari Beha, his shop assistant, who encouraged him to attend ballet performances by Anna Pavlova and Mikhail Mordkin in 1911 and by the Ballets Russes de Sergei Diaghilev in 1912. As a result, he became a budding balletomane. In December 1914, Beaumont married Alice Beha, who shared his interests and who was instrumental in making their business successful.

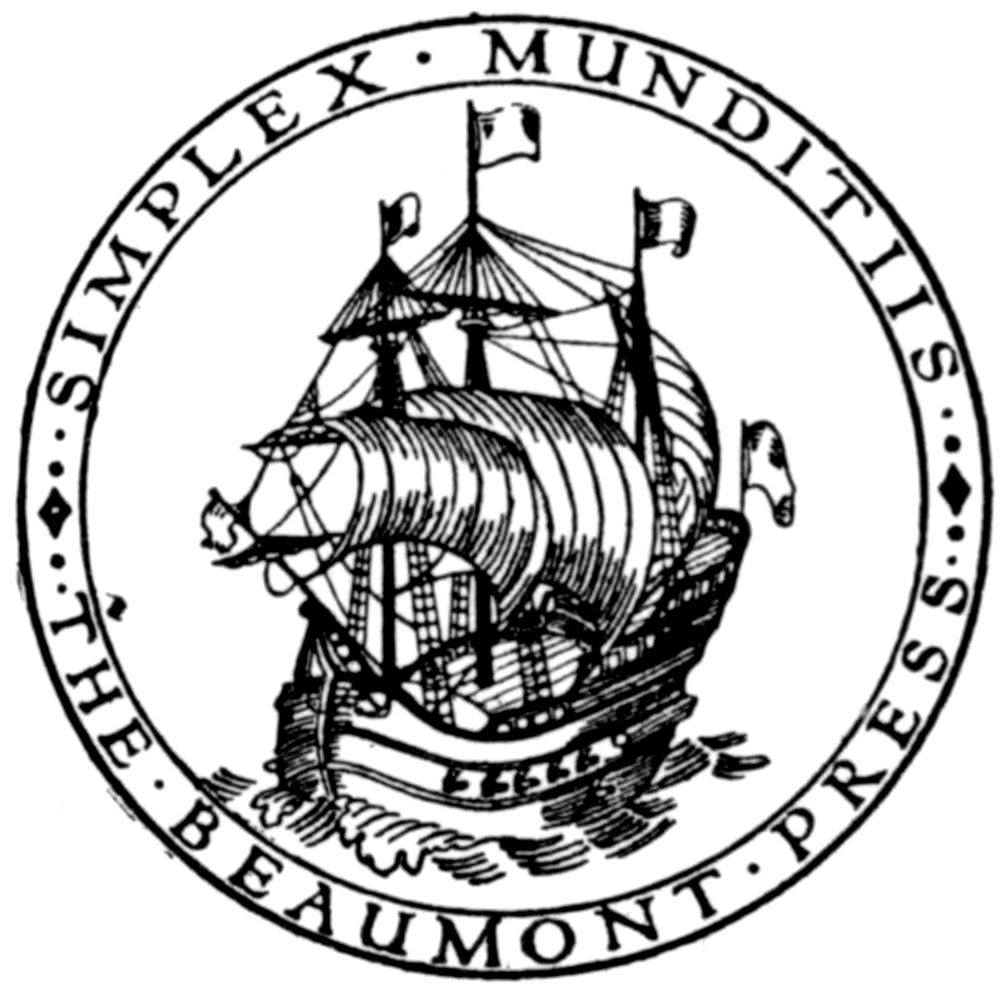
Ornament for the Beaumont Press.

In 1917, Beaumont expanded his sphere of operations by founding the Beaumont Press and beginning to publish fine books of poetry, essays, and other literary works. However, as his affinity for ballet developed into a deep passion, the inventory at his shop gradually changed from a focus on general literature to a concentration on dance. He began writing and publishing articles on ballet and increasing his inventory of books on dance and the theatrical arts. By 1920 his shop had become a centre for ballet lovers as well as fans of other dance forms. With a large and diverse stock of books in dance literature, it was internationally known as a source of works in history, criticism, and appreciation of the art. It remained so until it closed in 1965, after fifty-five years of operation.

Over those years, Beaumont became a friend and mentor to countless dancers, teachers, and researchers throughout the world. Among his friends was the Russian ballerina Lydia Lopokova, who took him in 1918 to observe a class taught by the Italian ballet master and pedagogue Enrico Cecchetti. Beaumont was favourably impressed by what he saw. He soon became a friend of Cecchetti's and a strong advocate of his method of training students. At Cecchetti's urging, he spent the next four years working with the maestro and dancer Stanislas Idzikowski to codify and preserve the Cecchetti method of teaching. Their collaboration resulted in a technical manual (1922) that is still used today to train dancers around the world. Beaumont also worked as coauthor with Cecchetti-trained dancer Margaret Craske in producing work on allegro technique, published some years later.

In 1922, as Cecchetti neared retirement, Beaumont, along with Craske, Friderica Derra de Moroda, Ninette de Valois, Marie Rambert, and others, founded the Cecchetti Society, with the maestro himself as president and his wife as vice-president. Its purpose was to disseminate and monitor the master's style and method of teaching. The Cecchetti Society remained independent until 1924, when it was absorbed into the Imperial Society of Teachers of Dancing, which now oversees the training of dancers in the Cecchetti method in the United Kingdom, the United States, Canada, Australia, and South Africa.

Beaumont was president of the Cecchetti Society for many years (1923–1970), editor of Dance Journal (1924–1939), and influential ballet critic of The Sunday Times (1950–1959). He also served as chairman of the ballet section of the London Critics Circle (1951–1961). Throughout his life he maintained a formal, somewhat reserved, demeanor in public—he always wore a neat suit and tie, and, in deference to his erudition, almost everyone called him Mr. Beaumont—but he was welcoming, friendly, and helpful to the patrons of his shop, whether they were famous dancers or student researchers. He continued to write after he closed his shop and remained a revered figure in the dance world until he died in 1976.

== Selected works ==
Beaumont was a prolific author. He wrote and published numerous books on ballet and other kinds of dance, many as sole author and a few with friends as coauthor. He also wrote fairy tales and other books for children, as well as articles published in newspapers, popular magazines, and scholarly journals. His translations of classic works on dance from French and Italian are still valued today. His magnum opus was The Complete Book of Ballets (1937) and its three supplements (1942, 1954, 1955). Although no longer in print, it remains an invaluable source of accurate information on more than three hundred ballets of the nineteenth and early twentieth centuries.

An extensive bibliography of his works by Katherine Sorley Walker was published in Dance Chronicle 26.1 (2003), 87–100. Selections are given herein.

=== As author or coauthor ===
- The Art of Lydia Lopokova. London: Beaumont, 1920.
- The History of Harlequin. London: Beaumont, 1922.
- A Manual of the Theory and Practice of Classical Theatrical Dancing (Cecchetti Method). London: Beaumont, 1922. With Stanislas Idzikowski as coauthor. Reissued as The Cecchetti Method of Classical Ballet: Theory and Technique by Dover Publications (Mineola, N.Y., 2003).
- The First Score: An Account of the Foundation and Development of the Beaumont Press and Its First Twenty Publications. London: Beaumont, 1927.
- A Bibliography of Dancing. London: The Dancing Times, 1929.
- Enrico Cecchetti: A Memoir. London: Beaumont, 1929.
- The Theory and Practice of Allegro in Classical Ballet (Cecchetti Method). With Margaret Craske as coauthor. London: Beaumont, 1930.
- A History of Ballet in Russia (1613–1881). London: Beaumont, 1930.
- Fanny Elssler (1810–1884). London: Beaumont, 1931.
- Flash-back: Stories of My Youth. London: Beaumont, 1931.
- Anna Pavlova. London: Beaumont, 1932.
- A Short History of Ballet. London: Beaumont, 1933.
- The Monte Carlo Russian Ballet (Les Ballets Russes du Col. W. de Basil). London: Beaumont, 1934.
- A Miscellany for Dancers. London: Beaumont, 1934.
- Michel Fokine and His Ballets. London: Beaumont, 1935.
- Three French Dancers of the 19th Century: Duverny–Livry–Beaugrand. London: Beaumont, 1935.
- The Complete Book of Ballets: A Guide to the Principal Ballets of the Nineteenth and Twentieth Centuries. London: Putnam, 1937.
- The Romantic Ballet in Lithographs of the Time. With Sacheverell Sitwell as coauthor. London: Beaumont, 1938.
- The Diaghilev Ballet in London: A Personal Record. London: Putnam, 1940.
- Supplement to the Complete Book of Ballets. London: Putnam, 1942.
- Vaslav Nijinsky. 2d ed. London: Beaumont, 1943.
- The Ballet Called Giselle. 2d rev. ed. London: Beaumont, 1945.
- The Sadler's Wells Ballet. London: Beaumont, 1946.
- Ballet Design: Past and Present. London: Studio Publications, 1946.
- Margot Fonteyn. London: Beaumont, 1948.
- Dancers under My Lens: Essays in Dance Criticism. London: Studio Publications, 1949.
- The Ballet Called Swan Lake. London: Beaumont, 1952.
- Antonio: Impressions of the Spanish Dancer. With 20 photos. London: A.&C. Black, 1952.
- Ballets of Today, Being a Second Supplement to the Complete Book of Ballets. London, 1954.
- Ballets Past and Present, Being a Third Supplement to the Complete Book of Ballets. London, 1955.
- A French-English Dictionary of Technical Terms Used in Classical Ballet. London: Beaumont, 1959.
- A Bookseller at the Ballet: Memoirs, 1891 to 1929. London: Beaumont, 1975. His autobiography, incorporating The Diaghilev Ballet in London; a record of bookselling, ballet going, publishing, and writing.

=== As translator or editor ===
- Arbeau, Thoinot. Orchesography: A Treatise in the Form of a Dialogue (1588). Translated from French by Cyril W. Beaumont. London: Beaumont, 1925.
- Constantini, Angelo. The Birth, Life, and Death of Scaramouche (1695). Translated from Italian by Cyril W. Beaumont. London: Beaumont. A biography of Tiberio Fiorilli, an actor of commedia dell'arte, including detailed explanatory notes and background information.
- Gautier, Théophile. The Romantic Ballet as Seen by Théophile Gautier. Translated from French by Cyril W. Beaumont. London: Beaumont. Gautier's notices of all the principal performances of ballet given at Paris during the years 1837–1848.
- Lambranzi, Gregorio. New and Curious School of Theatrical Dancing (1716). Translated from Italian by Friderica Derra de Moroda. Edited by Cyril W. Beaumont. London: Beaumont, 1928.
- Levinson, Andre. Marie Taglioni. Translated from French by Cyril W. Beaumont. London: Beaumont, 1930.
- Noverre, Jean-Georges. Letters on Dancing and Ballets (1760).Translated from French by Cyril W. Beaumont. London: Beaumont, 1930.
- Rameau, Pierre. The Dancing Master (1725). Translated from French by Cyril W. Beaumont. London: Beaumont, 1931.

== Awards and honours ==
In recognition of his work in dance history, Beaumont received the Queen Elizabeth II Coronation Award from the Royal Academy of Dancing in 1962. That same year he was named an Officer of the Order of the British Empire on the queen's honours list. He was also recognised and honoured by the governments of France and Italy for his translations of classic works and his studies of dance traditions in their countries. After being named to the Ordre des Palmes Académiques, for distinguished academics in the world of culture, he was made a Chevalier de la Légion d'Honneur in France and was named an Ufficiale Ordine al Merito (Officer of the Order of Merit) in Italy.
