= Sally Arnup =

British sculptor

Sally Arnup FRBS ARCA
- Born: Sally Robina Baynton Williams; 15 July 1930; London, England
- Died: 22 December 2015 (aged 85); York, England
- Resting place: Holy Trinity Church, Holtby, Yorkshire
- Education: Kingston School of Art; Camberwell School of Arts and Crafts; Royal College of Art
- Known for: Sculpture
- Spouse: Mick Arnup (m. 1953–2008; his death)

Sally Arnup (15 July 1930 – 22 December 2015) was an English sculptor known for her depictions of animals. Her studios, where she worked alongside her husband Mick Arnup, were located at Holtby, a village near York.

== Early life and education ==
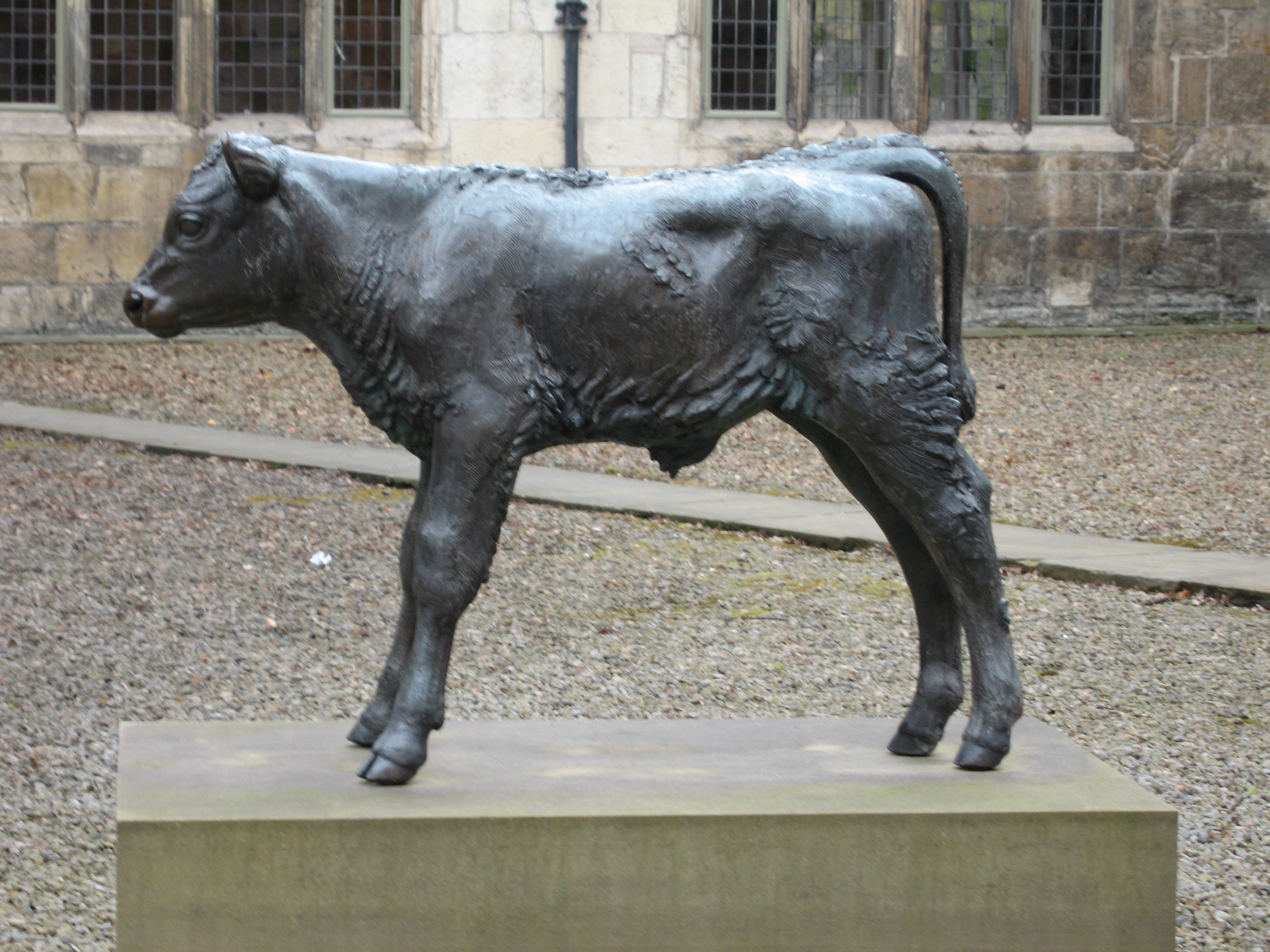
Frisian Calf, King's Manor, by Sally Arnup

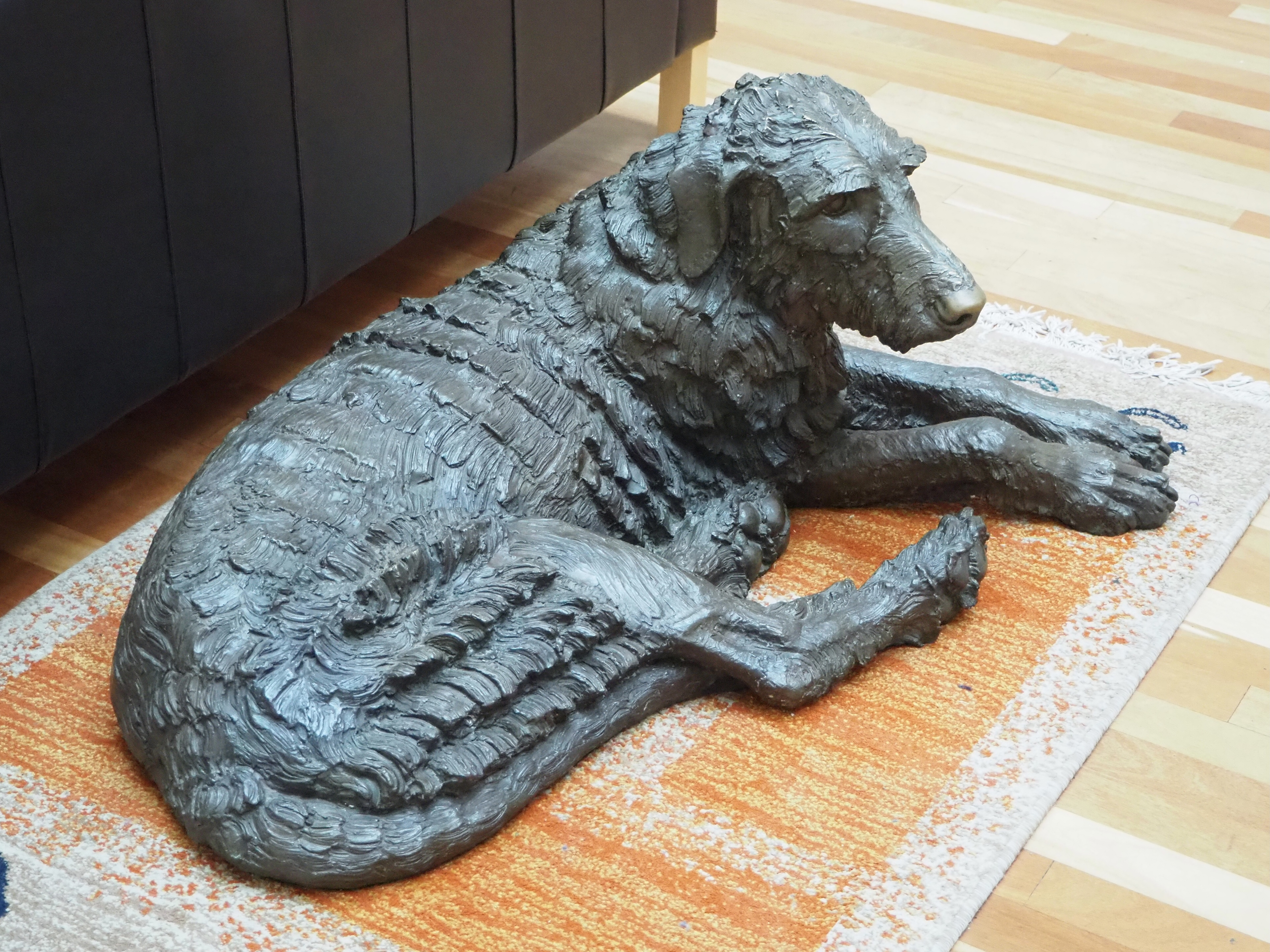
Irish Wolfhound, York Art Gallery, by Sally Arnup

Sally Robina Baynton Williams was born on 15 July 1930 in London.

She began studying at the Kingston School of Art at the age of 13. She later studied at Camberwell College of Arts and the Royal College of Art, where she was taught by both Frank Dobson and John Skeaping.

== Career ==
From 1958 to 1972 Arnup was the head of sculpture at York College of Art.

She retired from teaching in 1974 to focus on her artistic career.

Arnup's studios were located at Holtby, a village near York. The Arnup Studio where both Sally and Mick Arnup worked was opened to the public in 2011 as part of York Open Studios.

== Artworks and exhibitions ==
Arnup's speciality as an artist was for bronze animal sculptures, often created with the live animal present.

Among her most notable commissions was a work for the Duke of Edinburgh’s 80th Birthday, depicting his Fell Pony Storm. In 1971 she cast a silver leopard which was presented to Queen Elizabeth II by the City of York.

She regularly exhibited at the Royal Academy in London, with the Royal Society of British Artists, with the Royal Scottish Academy and at the Paris Salon. In 1968 the University of York hosted a solo exhibition of her work as did Gainsborough House in Suffolk during 1998.

== Recognition and awards ==
In 1955 Arnup won the Royal Society of British Sculptors' Feodora Gleichen Award for women artists.

== Personal life ==
Arnup's married Mick Arnup in 1953 and they remained together until his death in 2008. He also taught art at York College of Art; both of them retired from teaching in 1974 to focus on their artistic careers.

== Death and legacy ==
In 2015, at the age of 85, Arnup suffered a stroke while modelling a horse for a large scale sculpture at stables near Thirsk. She later (22 December 2015) died in York Hospital from septicaemia. She was interred at Holy Trinity Church in Holtby.

A life-sized sculpture of an Irish Wolfhound by Arnup was posthumously donated to the York Art Gallery in 2017.

== Works in collections ==
| Title | Year | Medium | Gallery no. | Gallery | Location |
|---|---|---|---|---|---|
| Donkey Fowl | 1980–1981 | bronze on green marble | YORAG : 1501 | York Art Gallery | York, England |
| Male Nude | 1970–1987 | bronze | YORAG : 1421 | York Art Gallery | York, England |
| Ram's Head | c.1975 | bronze | S155 | Beecroft Art Gallery | Southend-on-Sea, England |
| Wall Lizard | 1975–1985 | bronze | YORAG : 1422 | York Art Gallery | York, England |
