= Margaret Craske =

British ballet dancer, choreographer and teacher (1892–1990)

- Born: 26 November 1892; Norfolk, England
- Died: 18 February 1990 (aged 97); Myrtle Beach, South Carolina, U.S.
- Other name: Margareta Krasova
- Occupations: ballet dancer, ballet teacher, writer on ballet
- Known for: Cecchetti method

Margaret Craske (26 November 1892 – 18 February 1990) was a British ballet dancer, choreographer and teacher of ballet.

== Life ==
Margaret Craske was born on 26 November 1892 in Norfolk, England, daughter of Edmund and Hannah Craske. She was a pupil and disciple of Enrico Cecchetti. When Cecchetti retired to Italy in 1923 she took over teaching at his studio in West Street, London. She taught and developed the Cecchetti method in England and later in the United States. From 1931 until her death she was a follower of Meher Baba.

She lived in India from 1939 until 1946, when she moved to the United States and resumed teaching, first at the American Ballet Theatre. From 1950 she taught at the Metropolitan Opera Ballet School, and from 1968 until 1983 at the Manhattan School of Dance.

Her pupils include many of the most important names in ballet in the English-speaking world, including Sir Frederick Ashton, Dame Margot Fonteyn, Sir Robert Helpmann, Cyril Beaumont, and Antony Tudor.

== Publications ==
The published works of Margaret Craske include:

- Margaret Craske, Cyril William Beaumont (1930). The Theory and Practice of Allegro in Classical Ballet (Cecchetti Method). [London]: C. W. Beaumont.
- ——— , Friderica Derra de Moroda (1956). The Theory and Practice of Advanced Allegro in Classical Ballet, Cecchetti method ... Edited with a preface by Cyril Beaumont. London: C. W. Beaumont.
- ——— (1980). The Dance of Love: my life with Meher Baba. North Myrtle Beach, SC: Sheriar Press. ISBN 9780913078402.
- ——— (1990). Still Dancing with Love: more stories of life with Meher Baba. Myrtle Beach, SC: Sheriar Press. ISBN 9780913078648.
