= Kenneth Mathiason Skeaping =

English portrait painter and illustrator

- Born: 13 December 1856; Liverpool, England
- Died: 16 May 1946 (aged 89); Cross Road, Tadworth, Surrey
- Occupations: Lithographer, portrait painter, and illustrator
- Spouse: Sarah Ann Rattenbury (m. 1895)
- Children: 4 (including John and Mary)

Kenneth Mathiason Skeaping (13 December 1856 – 16 May 1946) was an English lithographer, portrait painter and illustrator. His three children who survived to adulthood became leading exponents in early music, sculpture, and ballet.

== Biography ==
Skeaping was born in Liverpool on 13 December 1856 to decorative wood carver Joseph Nairn Skeaping (baptised on 6 August 1829 – 1 January 1902) (Note: Joseph died at Rainhill Lunatic Asylum nine days after being admitted on 24 December 1901.) and Mary Pollock Mathiason (baptised on 24 May 1835 – 14 March 1917), who had married at St. Philip's Church, Liverpool on 10 April 1853.

Skeaping was the second of the couple's nine children, (Note: Eight out of the couple's nine children were still alive at the time of the 1911 census (when the eldest was in her mid 50s) given that the under-five mortality rate was 464 per 1,000 for Liverpool in 1861. (Note: The infant mortality rate, i.e. the number of children who died before their first birthday was 230.63 per 1,000 children born in Liverpool. The early childhood mortality rate, i.e the number of children who survived to their first birthday but died before their fifth birthday was 303.27 per 1,000 for Liverpool. The numbers cannot be added together but the surviving proportions have to be multiplied by each other to give the overall surviving proportion, which then yields the total under-five mortality rate.) The only child of the couple that did not survive to see adulthood was Thomas (second quarter of 1867 – buried 24 October 1869)) and the eldest boy. At least two of his siblings had careers in the arts. His brother John Skeaping (21 May 1859 – 4 May 1940) was a figure and landscape painter, and a lithographer. (Note: John was an art master and then head master of the art school in St. Helens, near Liverpool. He exhibited frequently from 1889–1939, showing 47 works at the Beaux Arts Gallery, one work at the Brook Street Art Gallery, and 56 works at the Walker Art Gallery, Liverpool. In 1907 John married Emily Jane Brown (birth registered in the 3rd quarter of 1881 – 7 January 1919), born in St. Helens and daughter of John Brown, the local Borough Treasurer for St. Helens. Emily was herself an artist and exhibited nine works at the Walker in Liverpool between 1908 and 1916. She also published several How To manuals with Winsor & Newton including The Art of Dainty Decoration, 1914; How to Colour Photographs Successfully, 1915; and How to Make Beautiful Trimmings, 1915.) His sister Elizabeth Jane "Lily" Skeaping (14 September 1870 – 31 October 1947 ) was a figure, landscape, and miniature painter. (Note: Lily studied at the Liverpool School of Art and in Continental Europe. She taught dress design at the St. Helens School of Art and art at the Liverpool Technical Institute. She exhibited from 1894 to 1930 with two works at the Royal Birmingham Society of Artists, 82 works at the Walker Art Gallery, Liverpool, and one work at the Royal Institute of Painters in Water Colours. Lily married fellow artist Bernard Kaufmann (Note: His surname is variously written as Kaufman or Kaufmann.)(7 September 1870 – 19 October 1900) who exhibited from 1892 until a year after his death with three works at the Royal Birmingham Society of Artists, 23 works at the Walker Art Gallery, Liverpool, and three works at the Royal Institute of Painters in Water Colours.)

It is not clear where Skeaping was educated. His family were close knit, and he initially worked with his mother helping her to make wigs from real hair, (Note: His maternal grandfather Kenneth Mathiason was a hair dresser, and presumably made wigs also.) before training as a lithographic artist, which is how he recorded his occupation in the 1881 census. He was still registered to vote at his parents' home at 50 Warren StreetHe travelled to London in the early 1880s and met his future wife there in 1886. He subsequently spent time in Paris adsorbing the art of the impressionists and post-impressionists.

In 1895 he married Sarah Ann Rattenbury (2 January 1867 – second quarter 1960), the daughter of the late Thomas Swaine Rattenbury (6 June 1830 – 22 June 1877), a grocer and cheeses monger of New Cross. and grocer's shopwoman Sarah Rattenbury née Day (c. 1832 – 10 October 1898). The couple had four children:

- Kenneth Mathiason Skeaping (22 September 1897 – 14 October 1977), a musician and a leader and educator in early music. (Note: After his death, Early Music carried two pages of tributes to him from 11 different persons.)
- Sally Skeaping (13 August 1899 – 9 January 1916) who died of appendicitis and peritonitis (Note: Appendicitis can lead to Peritonitis if the appendix bursts.) at Guy's Hospital, London aged 16, in the presence of her mother. She was buried near her home at Bexleyheath.
- John Rattenbury Skeaping RA (9 June 1901 – 5 March 1980), the noted sculptor.
- Mary Emma Skeaping MBE (15 December 1902–9 February 1984). the ballet dancer and producer.

The children had an unusual upbringing, apparently being educated entirely at home until their teens. In an interview in 1968, his son John recalls Skeaping as saying: ". . . two great qualities that children have are imagination and the power of imitation so the only things they should do is develop their imagination by learning music, dancing, painting, sculpture, and so forth an imitation - they can learn languages. (Note: John Skeaping was not only a sculptor, but also an occasional painter, a good amateur musician, (Note: John at cone stage had considered a career in music and completed a piano scholarship between the age of nine and eleven.) a keen horseman, and a linguist.) What is stuffed into children against their will over ten years they can forget in six months. What you learn willingly over that ten years, you never forget."

The eldest child was born in Woodford in Essex in 1897, and their address at the baptism of Sally in December 1899 was Kersal Villa, Malmsbury Road, South Woodford, Essex. They were still there in 1905, but by the time of the 1911 census they were living at Cliftonville, Warren Road, Bexleyheath, London, and were still there in 1918. by 1929 the electoral register shows the family (Note: The parents, with Kenneth and Mary.) had moved to 2 Eton College Road, in Camden, London. They were still there ten years later at the time of the 1939 Register in September of that year, and in the street directory for 1840. However, Skeaping had moved to Corners, Cross Road, Tadworth in Surrey by 1945, and was said to have lived there for several years when he died in 1946.

Skeaping died on 16 May 1946. He was 89 years old. His wife survived him by fourteen years, dying at the age of 93.

== Work ==
=== Painting ===
The first sale recorded for Skeaping was at the Autumn Exhibition of the Manchester City Art Gallery in 1886 where he sold Reciting the Charge of the Light Brigade for two guineas (£2 2s.). Skeaping exhibited 34 works at the Walker Art Gallery, Liverpool, and two works at the Manchester City Art Gallery. He showed Home Industry at the 1892 Isle of Man International Exhibition. In 1908 he was commissioned to paint a portrait of Lord Byron after an earlier portrait by Thomas Phillips RA, painted during Byron's life. In 1911 he exhibited thee "very delightful figure studies" Queen of the roses, Lily and the lilies, and Gone for ever, at the Spring Exhibition in the Rochdale Art Gallery. The following year he had two "very delightful child studies" For Harvest Festival and Peace on Earth at the gallery's Spring Exhibition. Currently five portraits by Skeaping are at the Rochdale Art Gallery. (Note: The Gallery is now known as Touchstones Rochdale.)

=== Illustration ===
It is not known to what extent Skeaping illustrated magazines. However, given that he illustrated the Tit-bits monster rhyme book in 1899, suggests he may have been doing illustrations for Tit-bits at least. He only seems to have illustrated a few handfuls of books, but two of these (Note: Told after Supper 1890 and the reissued of On the stage - and off in 1891, both by Jerome K. Jerome) have about 100 illustrations each.

The following list of books was generated by searching the Jisc Library Hub Discover database (Note: The Jisc Library Hub Discover brings together the catalogues of 168 major UK and Irish libraries. Additional libraries are being added all the time, and the catalogue collates national, university, and research libraries.) for books with the keyword "Skeaping" between 1880 and 1950, and then removing books by his brother John Skeaping, his son John Rattenbury Skeaping, his sister-in-law, Emily J. Skeaping, and other irrelevant items.

Books illustrated by Skeaping
Ser	Author	Year	Title	Publisher	Pages	Notes
1	Jerome K. Jerome	1890	Told after supper	Leadenhall Press, London	8, 169, 1, 14 p., 97 ill., 8º.	(Note: US edition (1891) available online at the HathiTrust.. Five ghost stories with no less than 97 illustrations by Skeaping.)
2	Anonymous	1891	The Devil's Acres	Leadenhall Press, London	175 p., 8º	(Note: Available online at the British Library. The story of a doctor's experience as he rides across a desert to visit a patient. The Morning Post said that "Skeaping's spirited illustrations are a welcome addition to the letter-press." Not to be confused with a book of the same name by Shad Denver (a pseudonym for Desmond Robert Dunn) which was published by Cleveland, Sydney in the 1970s .)
3	Jerome K. Jerome	1891	On the stage - and off, the brief career of a would-be actor	Leadenhall Press, London	viii, 219 p., 100 ill., 8º	(Note: The book was first published in 1885 by Field and Tuer, the Leaden Hall Press, London, without any illustrations. It was well received with the Glasgow Evening Post telling readers that they should read it if they wanted a good laugh.. It was reissued in 1891 by the Leadenhall Press, London with 100 illustrations by Skeaping. Available online at the Internet Archive. Note that other online versions of the book at Project Gutenberg or the HathiTrust are of the unillustrated 1891 American edition.)
4	Harry A. James	1894	A professional pugilist	Leadenhall Press, London	86 p., ill., 8º	(Note: Tells the story of a prize-fighter. The Whitstable Times states that the book is "well illustrated". The Merthyr Express states that The book . . . is most artistically illustrated. The Merthyr Times states that "The silhouette illustrations . . . are particularly good." (Note: The book was reviewed in Merthyr in part because the author was from there.) The Northern Whig stated that while a want of sympathy with prize-fighting prevented appreciating the book as a whole, they could and did "appreciate the very clever illustrations with which it is furnished" by Skeaping. The Liverpool Mercury said that the notable feature of the book was "certainly the illustrations, which are exceedingly well drawn and are both dramatic and humorous.")
5	Alice F. Jackson	1896	Our little sunbeams, stories for the little ones	Jarrold & Sons, London	186, 22 p., ill., 8º	(Note: The second volume in Jarrold's Snug Corner Series.)
6	Ellinor Davenport Adams	1896	The holiday prize, a modern fairy tale	Jarrold & Sons, London	205, 18 p., ill., 8º	(Note: The book is available online from the University of Florida Digital Collections. There are no fairies as such in the book. When all the children "of fair degree" (Note: The Children "of fair degree" are the children of middle-class parents, including the Squire's children the Rector's children, the doctor's children, and the children of retired colonels, a naval captain, a lawyer, and others.) in the village gather for the summer holidays at the Squire's his maiden sister offers a prize to the boy who becomes the most perfect embodiment of a knight. The Gentlewoman called the book "bright and imaginative", and said it was "still further enhanced by the artistic illustrations" of Skeaping. The book was the first volume of Jarrold's new Snug Corner Series. The Dundee Advertiser found that the fairies met with in the book were very real, and that the book taught "a gentle yet effective lesson" on courtesy. Skeaping provided 35 illustrations for the book plus a decorative title page, decorative heading bands for each chapter, and silhouettes for each end of chapter. He also illustrated the second Snug Corner volume Our little sunbeams, stories for the little ones.)
7	Lois Fison (as "Aunt Lars")	1896	The New Fairly-Land	Jarrold & Sons, London	66, 6, ill., 8º	(Note: The book tells of a girl who is taken away by a fairy queen to a strange country. The book was profusely illustrated by Skeaping with Alice Kirby Goyder and A. L. Tracy. The Scotsman calls the book "prettily illustrated".)
8	Grace Stebbing	1897	Why not? or, Climbing the Ladder, etc.	Jarrold & Sons, London	215, 9 p., 3 ill., 8º	(Note: St. James's Gazette called the theme of the story rather a hackneyed one that had no special merit. this is the book with the fewest illustrations of any of the books that Skeaping illustrated.)
9	Skeaping and F.C. Buchanan	1899	Tit-bits monster rhyme book	George Newnes, London	80 p., ill., 24 cm	(Note: Issued for Christmas 1899. It was full of old nursery rhyme jingles, and was priced at one penny.)
10	Harry A. James	1902	The doll-man's gift	George Newnes, London	198, ii p., ill., 8º	(Note: This is a story about a young girl and a fairy apple tree. The Pall Mall Gazette said that Skeaping's illustrations were "perfectly in harmony with this delicate tale" The Yorkshire Post said that Skeaping's "delicate illustrations attracted us". The Huntly Express said that "the illustrations and ornamental designs and letterings are excellent". The Northern Whig said that the book was "beautiful alike in subject, in treatment, in printing, and its quaint and well-executed pictures." The Walsall Osberver said that the book was "beautifully illustrated" and that Skeaping's illustrations deserve a special word of praise. The Westminster Gazette said that Skeaping's illustrations were "veritable things of beauty — full of delicacy and charm.")
