= Friderica Derra de Moroda =

British choreographer

Friderica Derra de Moroda MBE (2 June 1897 – 19 June 1978) was a British dancer, choreographer and dance teacher of Greek and Hungarian descent.

== Career ==
Derra de Moroda was born in Bratislava, Kingdom of Hungary, the daughter of a Greek writer and a Hungarian art historian. The family moved to Munich after the death of their father. After a ballet education, she made her debut, aged 14, on 22 February 1912 as a freelance dancer in the Vienna Secession.

From 1914, she was in England and founded her first own dance school in London. From 1918 she took lessons from Enrico Cecchetti for four years and then performed for the first time in Salzburg in 1923: A solo dance evening in the Great Hall of the Mozarteum delighted the audience. In 1936, she became a British national.

In 1941, she took over the direction and artistic responsibility of the ballet of the National Socialist cultural organization Kraft durch Freude in Berlin, which toured regularly until 1944.

De Moroda was interned as a British citizen in a camp at Lake Constance towards the end of the war. After the death of her sister, Minka, in December 1950, de Moroda inherited the Villa Schmederer and, in 1952, she established there a ballet school, which she ran until 1967 and which was attended above all by the members of the ballet from the Salzburger Landestheater, but also by the later solo dancer Margot Werner.

From 1960 onward, she devoted herself increasingly to dance research and built up an extensive library of dance-specific literature. The estate of the Derra de Moroda Dance Archives is publicly accessible at the Institute for Musicology of the University of Salzburg.

== Legacy ==
On 15 June 1977, she was the first woman ever to be awarded an honorary doctorate from the University of Salzburg.

In 1936, she rediscovered the original manuscript of the Nuova e curiosa scuola de' balli theatrali by Gregorio Lambranzi.

She was made a Member of the Order of the British Empire (OBE) in 1974.

== Death ==
Friderica Derra de Moroda died in 1978 in Salzburg, aged 81.
