= John Skeaping =

British artist and sculptor (1901–1980)

John Skeaping RA
- Born: John Rattenbury Skeaping; 9 June 1901; South Woodford, England
- Died: 5 March 1980 (aged 78)
- Education: Goldsmiths College; Central School of Arts and Crafts; Royal Academy Schools
- Known for: Sculpture
- Spouse: Barbara Hepworth (m. 1925; div. 1933)

John Rattenbury Skeaping, RA (9 June 1901 – 5 March 1980) was an English sculptor and equine painter and sculptor. He designed animal figures for Wedgwood, and his life-size statue of Secretariat is exhibited at the National Museum of Racing and Hall of Fame.

== Biography ==
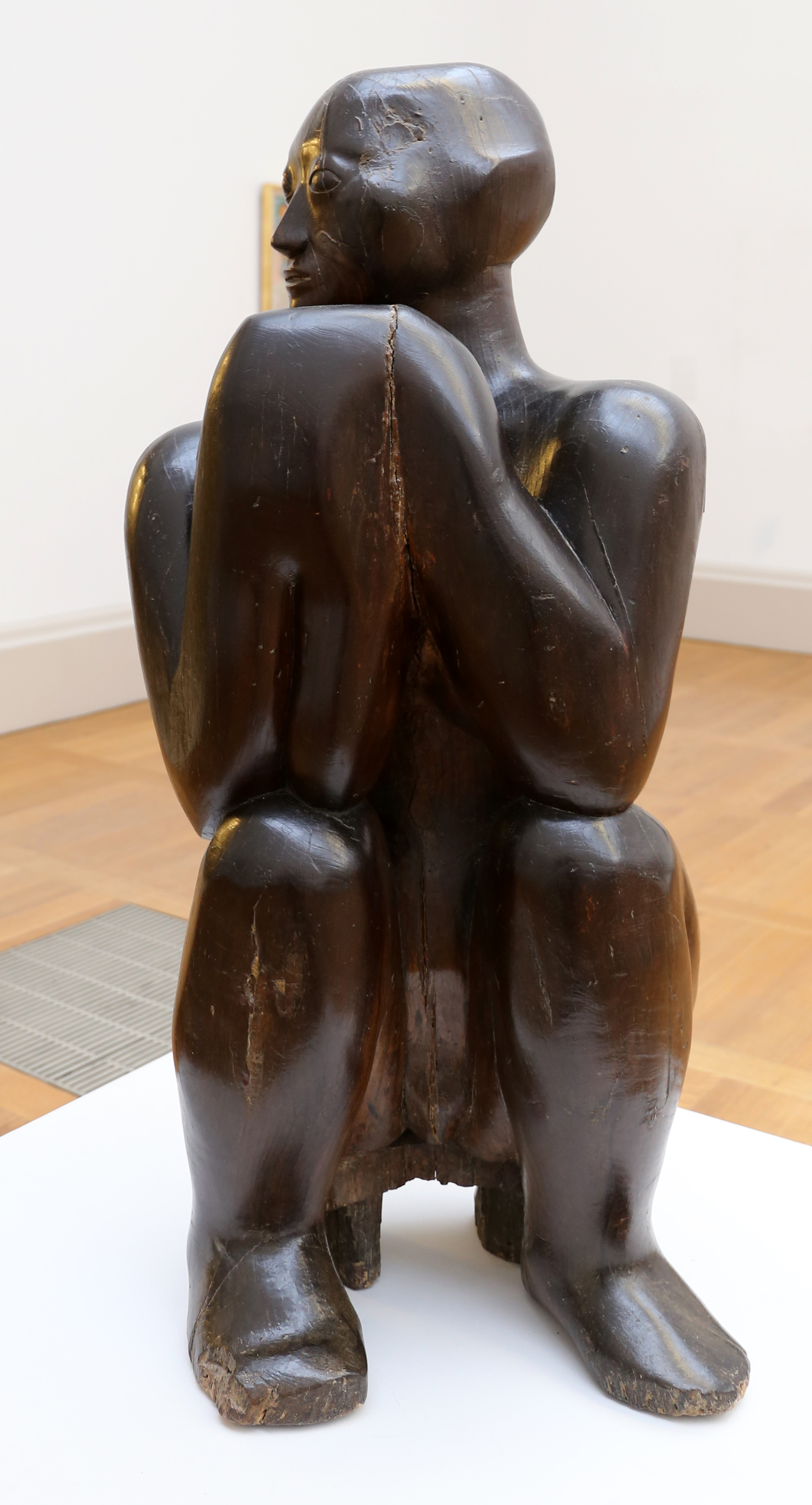
Akua-ba, 1931, Tate

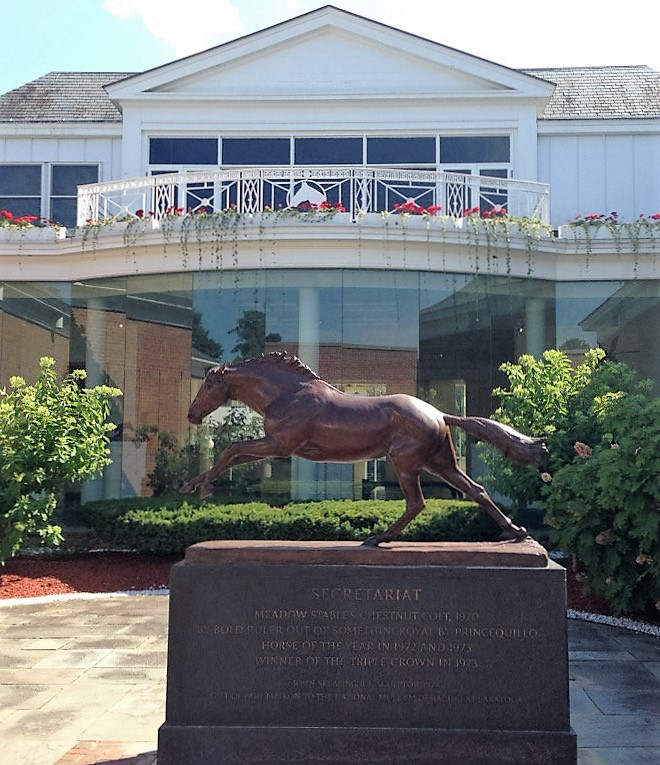
Skeaping's life-size statue of Secretariat at the National Museum of Racing and Hall of Fame in Saratoga Springs, New York

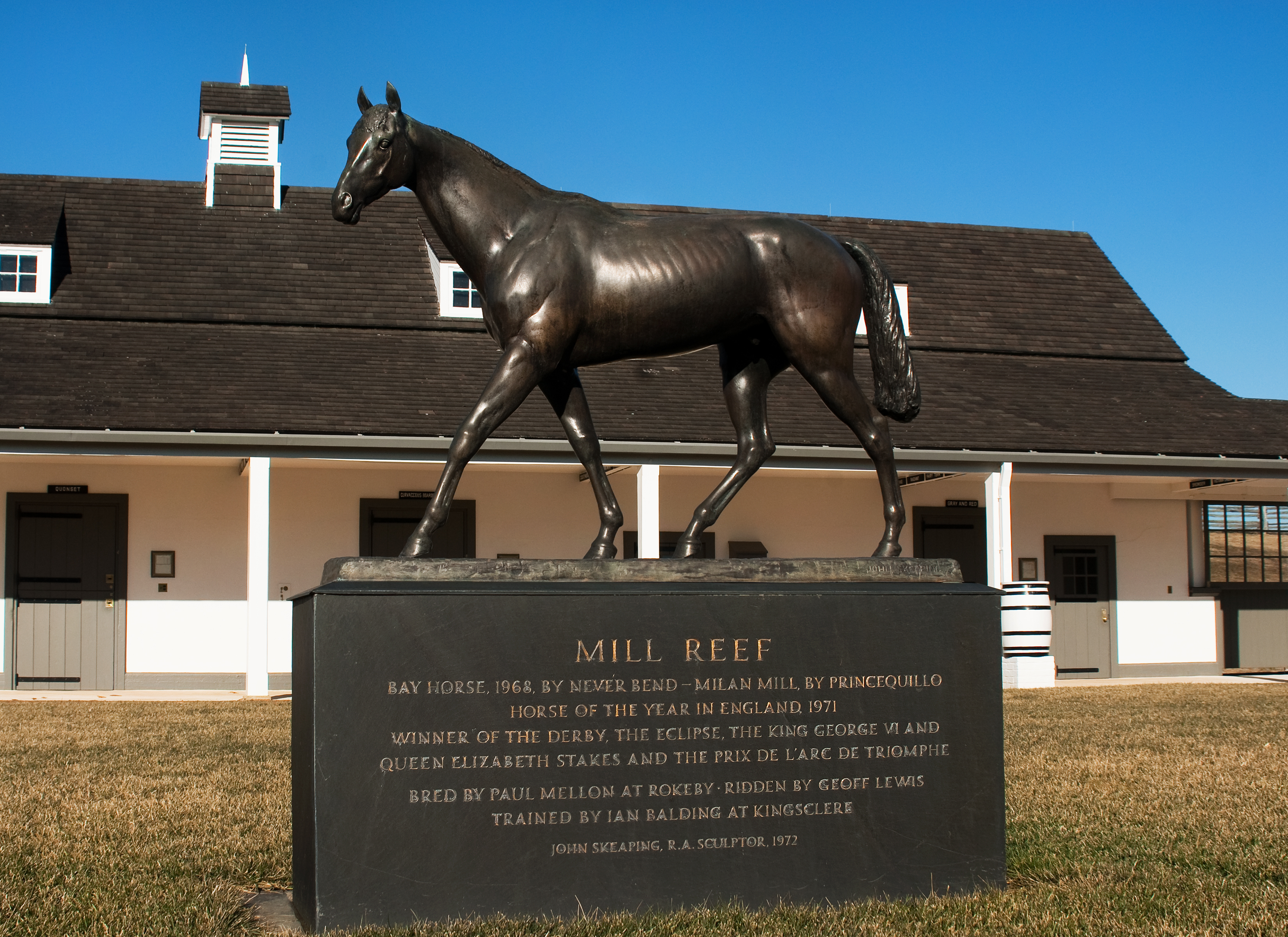
Mill Reef (1972), Rokeby Stables, Upperville, Virginia.

Born in South Woodford, Essex, Skeaping was the eldest son of the painter Kenneth Mathieson Skeaping, and studied at Goldsmiths College in London, the Central School of Arts and Crafts between 1917 and 1919, and later at the Royal Academy until 1920. In 1924, he won the British Prix de Rome and its scholarship to the British School at Rome.̣

Skeaping was the first husband of the sculptor Barbara Hepworth, whom he met while studying in Rome. They married in May 1925 in Florence. The couple had a joint exhibition in 1928 at the Alex Reid and Lefevre Gallery in Glasgow. They had a son, Paul Skeaping, who was born in 1929 and died in 1953 in Thailand. Hepworth and Skeaping began divorce proceedings in 1931; the divorce was finalised in March 1933.

He was a member of the London Group from 1928 to 1934, joined the Seven and Five Society in 1932, and later, after World War II, worked for a period in Mexico. During the War, Skeaping had been commissioned by the War Artists' Advisory Committee to produce a portrait bust. He was elected to the Royal Academy in 1960, having exhibited there since 1922. Skeaping wrote several books on drawing and an autobiography, Drawn from Life was published in 1977. From 1948, he taught sculpture at the Royal College of Art and was professor of sculpture there from 1953 to 1959.

Skeaping later lived in Devon near the village of Chagford and moved to the Camargue, France in 1959. A BBC documentary One Pair of Eyes – John Skeaping (1970) directed by David Cobham was produced for BBC TV during Skeaping's time there. The Tate Gallery owns eight works by Skeaping. His work was also part of the painting event in the art competition at the 1948 Summer Olympics. Two life-size racehorses by Skeaping were cast by H.H. Martyn & Co., Hyperion in 1962 and Chamossaire in 1966. The statue of Hyperion is now located in the National Horse Racing Museum, while that of Chamossaire is in Snailwell.

== Portrait sculptures ==
Marble heads dating from London, c. 1927 of Barbara Hepworth by Skeaping, and of Skeaping by Hepworth are documented by photograph in the Retrospective catalogue, but are both believed lost. A stone head of Arthur Lett-Haines dates from 1933, when Skeaping was living in the artists' colony at the house of Sir Cedric Morris after the breakup of his marriage to Hepworth. A bronze sketch (1978) of Skeaping exists by Sally Arnup.

== Animals for Wedgwood ==
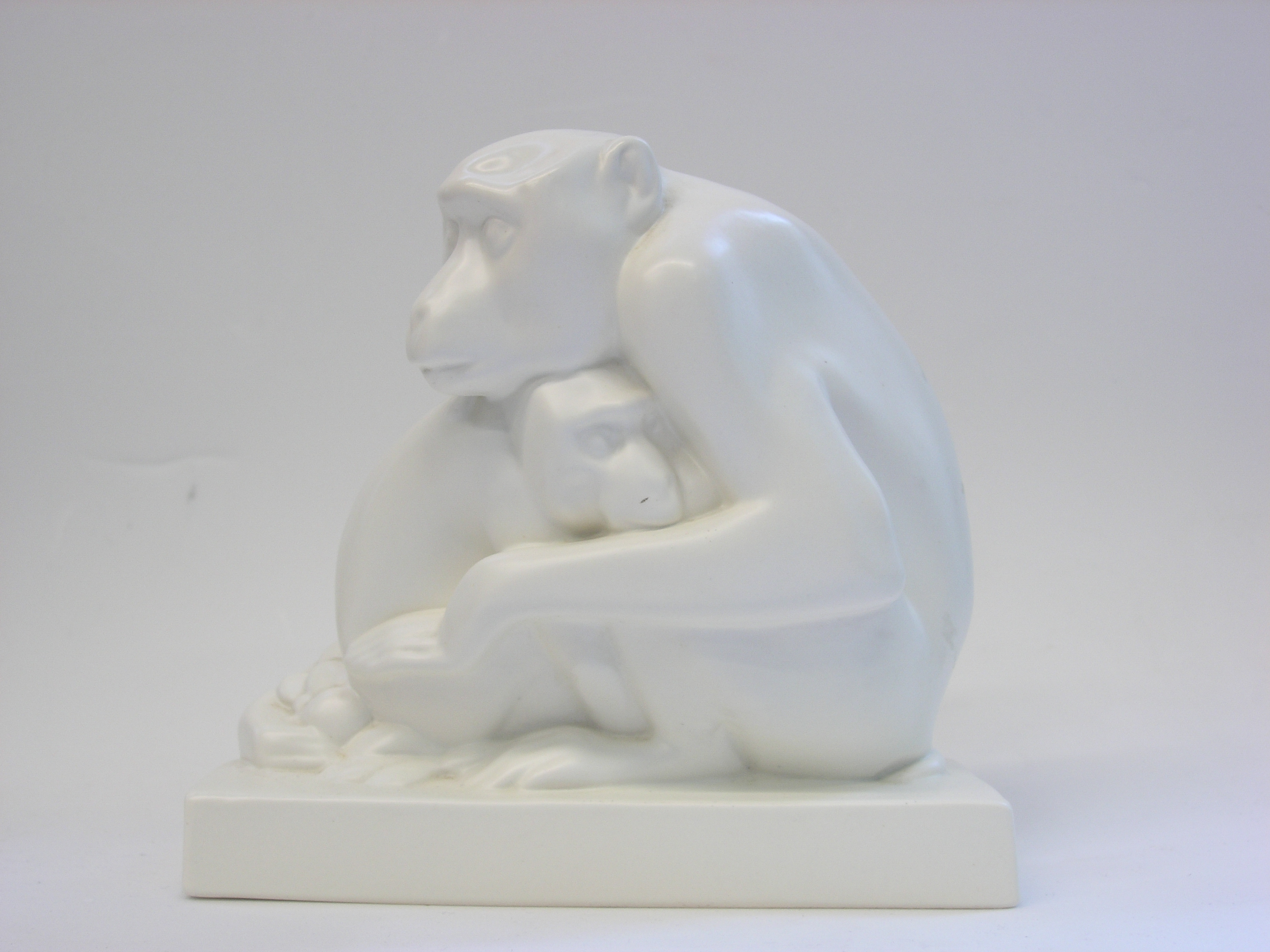
Monkeys

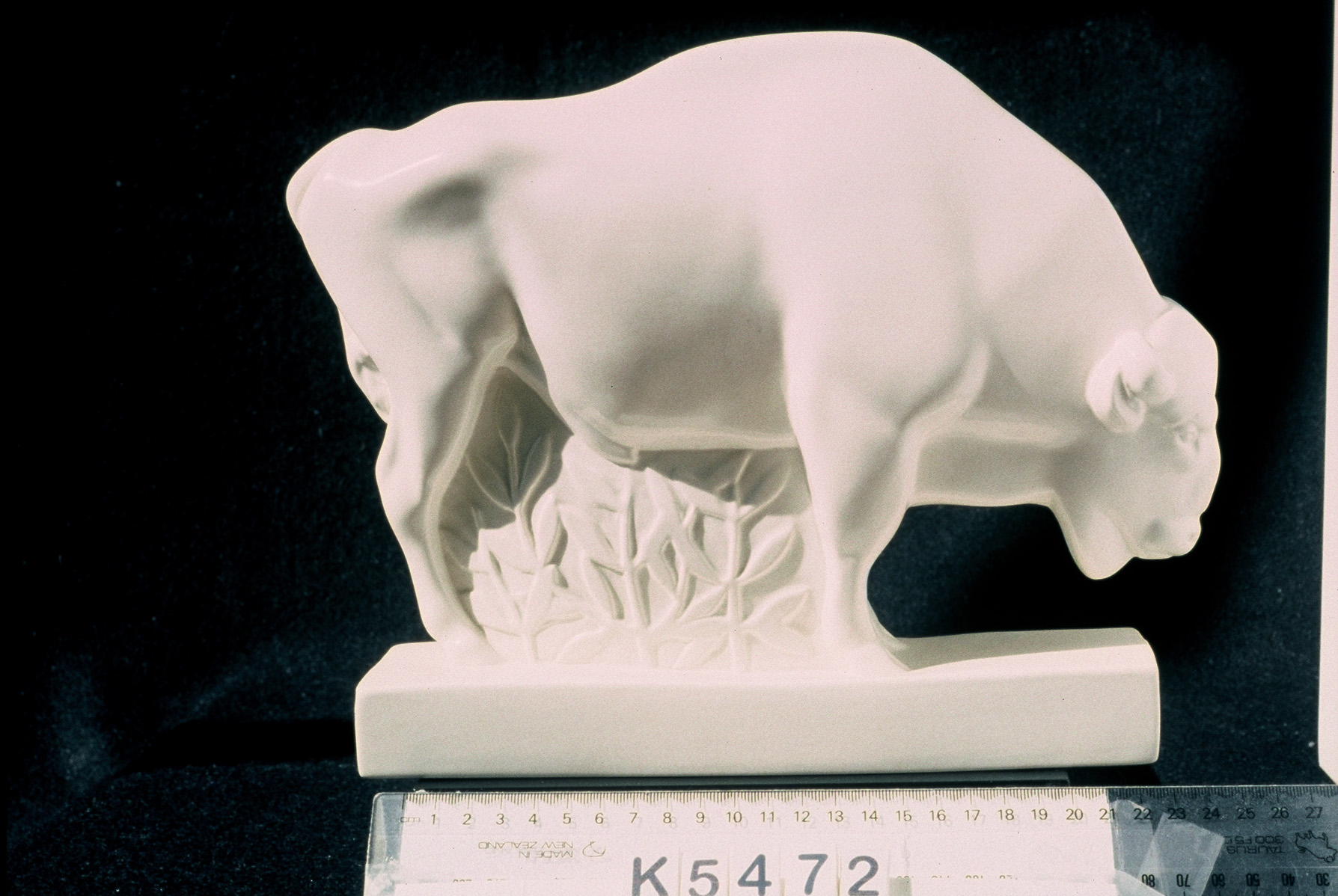
Bison

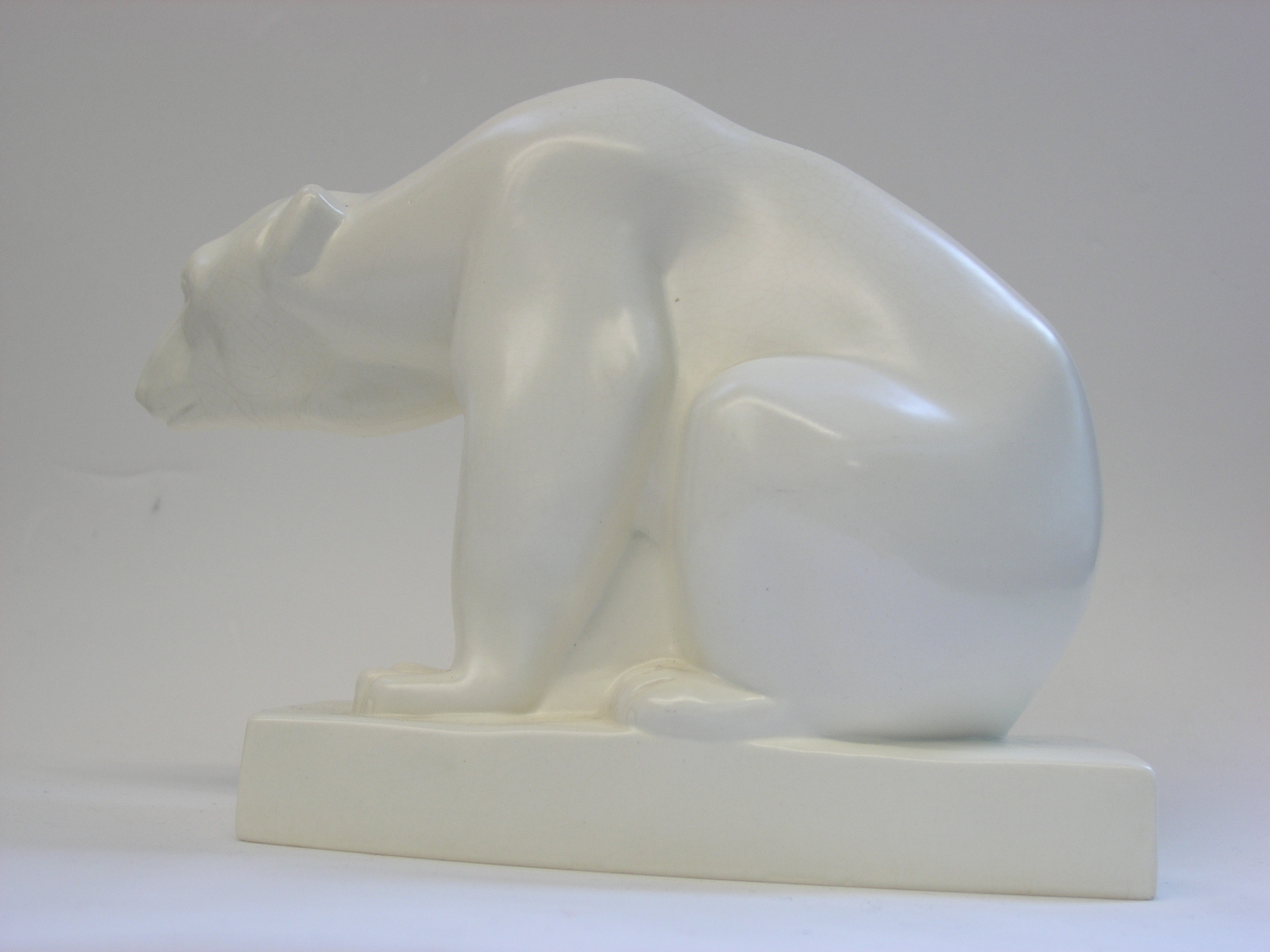
Polar bear
