= Cecchetti method =

Style of ballet and ballet training method

The Cecchetti method is variously defined as a style of ballet and as a ballet training method devised by the Italian ballet master Enrico Cecchetti (1850–1928). The training method seeks to develop essential skills in dancers as well as strength and elasticity. Cecchetti-trained dancers are commonly found in ballet and other dance companies throughout the world.

== History ==
The greatest influence on the development of the Cecchetti method was Carlo Blasis, a ballet master of the early 19th century. A student and exponent of the traditional French school of ballet, Blasis is credited as one of the most prominent ballet theoreticians and the first to publish a codified technique, the "Traité élémentaire, théorique, et pratique de l'art de la danse" ("Elementary, Theoretical, and Practical Treatise on the Art of the Dance"). Reputedly a very rigorous teacher, Blasis insisted on his students conforming to strict technical principles when learning to dance, a philosophy which Cecchetti learnt from his own teachers, who were all students of Blasis (Giovanni Lepri, Cesare Carnesecchi Coppini and Filippo Taglioni). Consequently, the key characteristic of the Cecchetti method is the adherence to a rigid training regime, designed to develop a virtuoso technique, with the dancer having a complete understanding of the theory behind the movement.

The other key influences on the Cecchetti method came from his own professional career as a dancer, which exposed him to many different techniques and styles of ballet. When he began to gain a reputation as a teacher, he experimented with these various styles, fusing the best elements of each to create his own ballet technique and training system, the eponymous Cecchetti method. Such was the success of Cecchetti's teaching, he is recognised as one of the key contributors to modern classical ballet, his method credited with significantly improving the teaching of classical ballet throughout Europe. Where previously ballet teaching had been haphazard and reliant on the preferences and style of the individual teacher, the Cecchetti method established the model of standardised teaching which is the basis of all professional ballet teaching today.

Initially, Cecchetti passed on his method by teaching it to his pupils and professional dancers, including well known dancers of the early 20th century, such as Anna Pavlova, Alicia Markova, George Balanchine and Serge Lifar. Many of his students later taught the Cecchetti method, including Ninette de Valois, Marie Rambert, Laura Wilson, Margaret Craske and Olga Preobrajenska. A number of professional ballet schools have historically used the Cecchetti method, including the Royal Ballet School, Rambert Ballet School, National Ballet School of Canada, and the Australian Ballet School.

In 1922, British writer and dance historian Cyril W. Beaumont collaborated with Cecchetti and Stanislas Idzikowski to document the method in print, producing the Manual of the Theory and Practice of Classical Theatrical Dancing. This continues to be the standard resource for the Cecchetti method throughout the world and it has been replicated in numerous forms, including Benesh and Laban notation. The method was further documented by Grazioso Cecchetti, one of Enrico's sons, in his treatise, Classical Dance.

The Cecchetti Society was established by Cyril Beaumont in London in 1922, with Maestro Enrico Cecchetti as its first president, and remained independent until it joined the Imperial Society of Teachers of Dancing, against the wishes of Enrico Cecchetti, in 1924.

Today, the Cecchetti training system is used internationally to teach classical ballet.

=== Australia ===
The Cecchetti Society was established in Australia in 1934 by Madam Lucie Saronova. The Society grew over the next 51 years while being administered by the Council of Management in Victoria, under the auspices of The Imperial Society of Teachers of Dancing in London. In 1987 The Cecchetti Society of Australia Inc. was formed as an autonomous Australian society under the administration of an elected National Council, composed of members from its state branches. The corporation's head office is located in Melbourne.

In 1997 an international organization, Cecchetti International Classical Ballet, was formed by founding members from Australia, Canada, Italy, South Africa, the United Kingdom and the USA. This organization, which became a non-profit Canadian corporation in 2004, is committed to keeping alive and raising the profile of the Cecchetti method of classical ballet and its training system throughout the world.

Today, the Cecchetti method is used at The Australian Ballet School, Victorian College for the Arts, and Queensland School of Excellence, and Xcel Dance Studios in Adelaide, South Australia.

=== United Kingdom ===
The Cecchetti teaching method was vital in the development of Classical Ballet in the United Kingdom and contributed heavily to modern-day British teaching methods. Enrico Cecchetti and his wife opened a ballet school in London in 1918, and his pupils included some of the most influential names in British ballet, many also influencing ballet throughout the world.

Dame Marie Rambert was a former pupil and colleague of Cecchetti, who also established a professional ballet school teaching his methods. This led to the formation of the UK's first ballet company, which survives today as the country's oldest established dance company, although it is now known as Rambert Dance Company and specialises in contemporary dance. The school also remains and is known as the Rambert School of Ballet and Contemporary Dance. Dame Ninette de Valois was a colleague of Cecchetti during her professional career with the Ballets Russes. She established The Royal Ballet in London, with many of the companies early dancers being pupils of Cecchetti. The Cecchetti method was also favoured by de Valois when she formed the Royal Ballet School. Phyllis Bedells, another Cecchetti pupil, would also play an important role in the teaching of ballet in Britain, as a founder member of the Royal Academy of Dance, which today is a classical ballet teaching examination board.

The British writer and dance historian Cyril W. Beaumont was a close friend of Cecchetti and, in 1922 he collaborated with Cecchetti to codify the training technique into a printed syllabus, The Cecchetti Method of Classical Ballet, which has become the foremost reference for Cecchetti method teachers worldwide. Cecchetti also gave Beaumont permission to establish the Cecchetti Society to maintain the method and ensure that it would be passed on to future ballet teachers in its original form. Branches of the Cecchetti Society were subsequently established around the world, most notably in Australia, South Africa, Canada and the US. The original Cecchetti Society still exists in Britain, although against the wishes of Enrico Cecchetti it was absorbed into the Imperial Society of Teachers of Dancing, which continues to maintain the Cecchetti method as a separate entity from its own Imperial Classical Ballet syllabus.

Today, the Imperial Society of Teachers of Dancing promotes the Cecchetti method as a syllabus-based series of dance examinations, which are taught by registered teachers around the world in both pre-vocational and vocational dance schools. The syllabus is a progressive series of graded and vocational graded examinations, which are accredited by the Qualifications and Curriculum Authority, the government-appointed regulator of qualifications in England and Wales. Successful exam passes in the Cecchetti method can therefore be submitted for credit towards other nationally recognised qualifications, however this only applies in England and Wales. These qualifications are in reality usually taken by the amateur rather than the professional dancer.

There are a few ballet teachers, such as Gavin Roebuck, who can trace their knowledge of the Cecchetti method in a direct line from pupils of Enrico Cecchetti, including generations of dancers trained at the Royal Ballet School, the Rambert School and Canada's National Ballet School.

== Examinations ==
=== United Kingdom ===
In 2002, the Imperial Society of Teachers of Dancing, became an accredited dance awarding body. As a result of this change, its system of exams and qualifications were revised, including those of the Cecchetti faculty. The ISTD now operates a three tier system of qualifications, which are recognised by the national qualifications regulators of England, Wales and Northern Ireland:

- Graded examinations
- Vocational graded examinations
- Teaching qualifications

The system of teaching qualifications has been revised to include three levels of qualification. The first level, the DDE is compulsory for any person wishing to teach the ISTD syllabus and enter candidates for examinations. The Licentiate and Fellowship levels are optional, higher level qualifications that existed before 2002 and retain their previous status.

- Diploma in Dance Education
- Licentiate
- Fellowship

=== United States ===
Students are tested on their ability to properly execute a number of specifically choreographed routines that emphasize a particular ballet movement. They are also graded on their knowledge of the theory and terms.

Grades five through seven correspond to his original levels.

In the American version, there are a few different marks for passing a level. From lowest to highest they are:

- Pass on condition (bad and fairs)
- Pass (fairs and goods)
- Pass plus (mostly good with a few excellents)
- Pass Commended (mostly excellent, a few good)
- Pass Highly Commended (perfect exam, no corrections, all excellent)

All exams have different sections that the student is graded on. These sections include theory, barre, port de bras, adage, allegro, petit allegro, tours, pointe work, musicality, quality, and style among other things. These are all part of the total grade. Dancers taking their grade four exam will be asked to choreograph a one-minute dance, with teacher supervision, and perform it to the examiners. Students taking their grade 7 will be asked to perform a variation to the examiners.

A dancer who achieves a pass condition must wait two years before attempting the next exam level.

Student level examinations: designed to be more technically demanding and to provide a solid technical base so that when the dancer reaches higher levels, they can focus more on artistry. Examiners will correct some things, such as pirouette and retire positions, without marking any of the students down unless they fail to correct. Levels: grade one to grade four.

Pre-professional examinations: career oriented, with a high level of ballet technique and artistry expected. Examiners will no longer teach in these levels and any correction will result in being marked down. Levels: grade 5 to grade 8/diploma.

Teacher Qualifying Examinations: Successful completion of these examinations leads to qualification with the Imperial Society of Teachers of Dancing. Levels: A.I.S.T.D. - Associate (provisional registration) A.I.S.T.D. - Associate Diploma (full registration) L.I.S.T.D. - Licentiate F.I.S.T.D. - Fellow (highest teaching qualifications and held by all examiners)

=== Australia ===
Cecchetti examinations are divided into seven categories:

- 1) Pre Primary and Primary
- 2) Grades
- 3) Assessments
- 4) Dance Spectrum One
- 5) Majors
- 6) Enrico Cecchetti Diploma
- 7) Status

1) PRE PRIMARY AND PRIMARY:

- The aim of these examinations is to provide an examination system for the once-a-week student, with the accent on enjoyment and dance quality.
- There are two examinations PRE-PRIMARY, and PRIMARY
- Pre Primary and Primary examinations are marked STANDARD NOT YET ATTAINED or PASS or PASS WITH MERIT or PASS WITH SPECIAL MERIT.

2) GRADE EXAMINATIONS:

- These examinations are designed to give the student a strong basic ballet technique with gradual buildup through the Grades.
- There are six grades - ONE, TWO, THREE, FOUR, FIVE and SIX. These may be preceded by Pre Primary and Primary.
- In all six grades they will be marked as follows: STANDARD NOT YET ATTAINED or PASS or CREDIT or COMMENDED or HIGHLY COMMENDED or HONOURS.

3) ASSESSMENTS:

- Assessments have been introduced to run parallel with the Grades 1 to 6, thereby, enabling these students to experience an examination situation without the stress of a result, whilst gaining confidence and receiving a written assessment of their performance.
- All rules pertaining to the Grades apply to the Assessments but NO RESULT will be given.

4) DANCE SPECTRUM ONE (DS1):

- DS1 has been developed for the Recreational and Vocational student who for various reasons may or may not wish to commence training in the Cecchetti Major levels.
- The emphasis of the syllabus will be on the enjoyment, improvisation and understanding of the Cecchetti Principles rather than dance technique, thereby enabling the recreational student to achieve a good result.
- There is no prerequisite examination to this examination stream.

5) MAJOR EXAMINATIONS:

- There are three Major examinations – Intermediate, Advanced 1 and Advanced 2 and they substantially cover the work of the Maestro Cecchetti.
- The Diploma examination completes this set of examinations (SEE NOTE ON DIPLOMA EXAMINATION).
- Examination order: All professional (Major) examinations must be taken in the correct order, progressing from Intermediate onwards. No level may be missed.

Intermediate

- May be taken as a practical examination as a Dancer (Category A).
- Mature age students (over 30 years) have the option of choosing either Category B(1) or B(2) as for Advanced 1 and Advanced 2.

Advanced 1 & Advanced 2

- May be taken in either Category A or Category B
- Category A: as a Dancer
- Category B (1:) as a Dancer who will be expected to perform all the work to their individual ability and answer questions about the technical and artistic content as applicable to the syllabus.
- Category B(2): as a mature age candidate (30 years and over) who will be expected to at a minimum, to walk thru the various exercises with some sense of the style and impetus required and explain their view of them in detail.
- Major examinations are marked as follows: PASS, CREDIT, COMMENDED, HIGHLY COMMENDED, HONOURS or STANDARD NOT YET ATTAINED.

Progress Examinations:

- These examinations are conducted in the Intermediate, Advanced 1, Advanced 2 and Diploma syllabi.
- No certificates are issued but a full report is given to help the student and teacher evaluate the progress of the student.
- A candidate may move directly from Progress Intermediate to Progress Advanced 1 examinations but cannot take the Advanced 1 examination until they have successfully taken the preceding examination.

6) THE ENRICO CECCHETTI DIPLOMA EXAMINATION:

- The Diploma is not part of the qualifying process and can be taken without having previously passed Intermediate, Advanced 1 or Advanced 2.
- The Diploma gives NO STATUS in the Organisation, but entitles the holder to carry the 'Holder of the Enrico Cecchetti Diploma' after their name.
- There are two categories of entrant:

1) DANCER – Dancers may take the examination in its entirety or in two parts separately — Part A and Part B.
2) TEACHER - Teachers may take the examination in its entirety or in two parts separately — Part A and Part B. The minimum age limit for teachers is 25 years of age.

- DIPLOMA will be marked PASS AWARDED or STANDARD NOT YET ATTAINED.

7) STATUS EXAMINATIONS (Professional Teaching Qualifications) There are five Status qualifications:

- i) Associate: A.C.B.A. - C.I.C.B.
- ii) Associate Diploma: A.(Dip)C.B.A. - C.I.C.B.
- iii) Licentiate: L.C.B.A. - C.I.C.B.
- iv) Licentiate Diploma: L.(Dip)C.B.A. - C.I.C.B.
- v) Fellowship: F.C.B.A. - C.I.C.B.

=== South Africa ===
In South Africa, the Cecchetti Society (established in 1928) has five Grades and the major examinations are the same as for the UK: Intermediate Foundation, Intermediate, Advanced 1 and Advanced 2. Examination passes are awarded as follows: Pass, Pass Plus, Commended, Highly Commended and Honours. To teach, the student must take the Associate examination after passing Advanced 1. Further qualifications are the same as for the UK and Australia. More information about Cecchetti in South Africa may be obtained by going to www.cecchetti.co.za
