= Enrico Cecchetti =

Italian ballet dancer and mime (1850–1928)

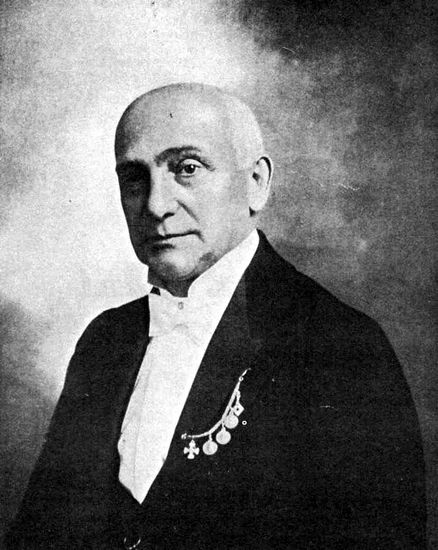
- Portrait, c. 1900
- Born: 21 June 1850; Rome, Papal States
- Died: 13 November 1928 (aged 78); Milan, Kingdom of Italy
- Spouse: Giuseppina de Maria (m. 1878; died 1927)

Enrico Cecchetti (Italian pronunciation: [enˈriːko tʃekˈketti]; 21 June 1850 – 13 November 1928) was an Italian ballet dancer, mime, and founder of the Cecchetti method. The son of two dancers from Civitanova Marche, he was born in the costuming room of the Teatro Tordinona in Rome. After an illustrious career as a dancer in Europe, he went to dance for the Imperial Ballet in St. Petersburg, Russia, where he further honed his skills. Cecchetti was praised for his agility and strength in his performances, as well as his technical abilities in dance. By 1888, he was widely accepted as the greatest ballet virtuoso in the world.

After an esteemed career in Russia, originating such roles as both the Bluebird and Carabosse in Petipa's masterpiece, The Sleeping Beauty, he turned to teaching. Some of his students included other notable dancers of the Imperial Ballet, such as: Anna Pavlova, Léonide Massine, and Vaslav Nijinsky. While in London in 1920, he provided instruction to the American ballerina Ruth Page and the British Ninette de Valois. He also restaged many ballets, including Petipa's definitive version of Coppélia in 1894, from which nearly all modern versions of the work are based. (This version was notated in the early 20th century, and is today part of the Sergeyev Collection). While teaching a class, Cecchetti collapsed and he died the following day, 13 November 1928.

Changes to the choreography of the male variations featured in the works of the Imperial Ballet's repertory. In 1890, Cecchetti performed in the ground-breaking production of The Sleeping Beauty, where his performance as the Bluebird caused a sensation in the audience at the Mariinsky Theatre. The choreography of the Bluebird has challenged male dancers even to the present day.

Cecchetti left the Imperial ballet in 1902 to accept the directorship of the Imperial Ballet School in Warsaw, Poland, then part of the Russian Empire. His farewell gala at the Mariinsky Theatre featured all of the leading ballerinas of the day, many of whom were his students. In order to have everyone pay him homage, the Paquita Grand pas classique was performed, with the inclusion of the favorite solos of all of the participating ballerinas. This led to the tradition of including a long suite of variations for several ballerinas.

In 1919 Cecchetti performed at the inaugural performance of the ballet, La Boutique fantasque, in London, appearing in the role of the shopkeeper.

== Mariinsky Theatre ==
In 1887 Cecchetti performed in St. Petersburg where Ivan Vsevolozhsky, the director of the Mariinsky Theatre saw him perform. He was so impressed with Cecchetti that he immediately hired Cecchetti as a principal dancer for the theatre.

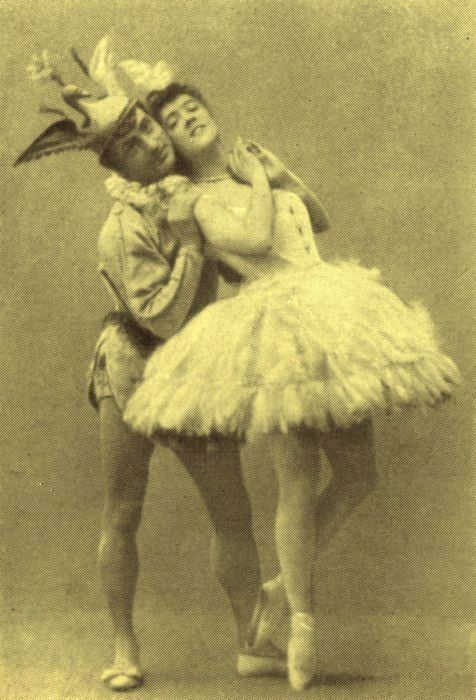
Varvara Nikitina and Enrico Cecchetti costumed for the Bluebird Pas de deux from Petipa's original production of The Sleeping Beauty. St. Petersburg, 1890

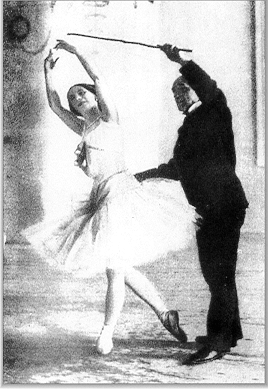
Enrico Cecchetti teaching Anna Pavlova in Paris, circa 1920

With the introduction of the pointe shoe in the early 19th century, ballet was dominated by female performers using pointe technique. In many ways male technique had been reduced to the role of an actor whose responsibilities as a dancer were relegated to a servant who partnered the ballerina. Cecchetti immediately began transforming the traditionally conservative roles for the male dancer, making drastic changes to the choreography of the male variations featured in the works of the Imperial Ballet's repertory. In 1890, Cecchetti performed in the ground-breaking production of The Sleeping Beauty, where his performance as the Bluebird caused a sensation in the auditorium of the Mariinsky Theatre. The choreography of the Bluebird has challenged male dancers even to the present day.

Cecchetti left the Imperial ballet in 1902 to accept the directorship of the Imperial Ballet School in Warsaw, Poland. His farewell gala at the Mariinsky Theatre featured all of the leading ballerinas of the day, many of whom were his students. In order to have everyone pay him homage, the Paquita Grand pas classique was performed with the inclusion of the favorite solos of all of the participating ballerinas. This led to the tradition of including a long suite of variations for several ballerinas.

In 1919 Cecchetti performed at the inaugural performance of the ballet La Boutique fantasque in London, appearing in the role of the shopkeeper.

== Teaching ==
In the tradition of classical ballet, techniques and parts are taught directly, person to person. The technique was passed on directly to Enrico Cecchetti, as he was taught by Giovanni Lepri in Florence, who in turn was taught by Carlo Blasis and the line can be traced back to Pierre Beauchamp, the first ballet master at the court of Louis XIV. Cecchetti also studied with other two colleagues of his father: Cesare Coppini, who worked a La Scala of Milan, and Filippo Taglioni, father of the dancer Maria Taglioni. All of them had been students of Carlo Blasis, who taught at La Scala of Milan. There he applied the method explained in the book Traité élémentaire, théorique et pratique de l'art de la danse, published in 1820. So, too, the Cecchetti method has been passed on directly by his former pupils such as Laura Wilson.

In 1925, Arturo Toscanini appointed Master Cecchetti as director of the La Scala theatre dancing school. Two years later, Cecchetti was deeply affected by the death of his wife and died in Milan on 13 November 1928.

== Cecchetti Method ==
Cecchetti created a ballet technique that is now known as the Cecchetti method. This technique is popular with past and present ballet teachers, remaining fresh and contemporary. After Cecchetti's death, Cyril Beaumont, Stanislas Idzikowski, Margaret Craske and Derra de Moroda decided to codify Cecchetti's method so it could continue to be used by ballet teachers to perfect the technique of ballet dancers. Under the Cecchetti Method, dancers follow strict routines and daily exercises to develop all-around skills to support learning and performance of every kind of dance.

== Legacy ==
Among his notable students there were: Anna Pavlova, Cia Fornaroli, Pierina Legnani, Léonide Massine, Attilia Radice, Vaslav Nijinsky, Tamara Karsavina, Dame Ninette de Valois, Dame Marie Rambert, Gisella Caccialanza, Vincenzo Celli, Luigi Albertieri, Dame Alicia Markova, Olga Preobrajenskaja, Matilda Kšesinskaja, Serge Lifar, George Balanchine, Ruth Page.

As dancer and choreographer, he created and interpreted the Eunuch in the Scheherazade (1910) of Michel Fokine, Kostchei in The Firebird (1910), and the Magician in Petrushka.

== Cultural depictions ==
- Pavlova and Cecchetti, duet from the Nutcracker, ballet by John Neumeier (The Frankfurt Ballet, 1971),
- Anna Pavlova, film by Emil Loteanu; portrayed by Georgio Dimitriou (1983).
- Nijinsky, film directed by Herbert Ross; portrayed by Anton Dolin (1980).

== See also ==
- List of dancers

== Sources ==
- Media related to Enrico Cecchetti at Wikimedia Commons
- History of Enrico Cecchetti at Cecchetti USA
