= Paula Hinton =

English ballet dancer

Paula Doris Hinton (1 June 1924 – 5 November 1996) was an English ballet dancer who became the wife and dancing partner of the choreographer Walter Gore.

== Biography ==
Born in Ilford, Essex, Hinton was the daughter of travelling opera singers who settled in Liverpool. Already in her mid-teens, she studied ballet there making her début in 1943 as Helen of Troy in Dr Faustus at the Playhouse, Liverpool. The following year, Andrée Howard recommended her to the Ballet Rambert. Hinton was initially only given minor roles in ballets from the choreographers Frederick Ashton, Antony Tudor and Frank Staff. However she soon moved on to larger roles including the Queen of the Wilis in Giselle.

After receiving further instruction from Stanislas Idzikowski and Audrey de Vos, she danced in Les Sylphides and played the lead in Howard's Lady into Fox. Her qualities were also noticed by their resident choreographer Walter Gore in 1948 who gave her leading roles in his Winter Night and Plaisance.

During Ballet Rambert's 1948 tour of Australia, Gore created roles in Winter Night for himself, Sally Gilmour and Hinton, and the ballet's plot mirrored the actual "love triangle" between the three of them. Up to that point, Gore and Gilmour had been in a relationship.

After appearing in a dramatic role in his Antonia, Hinton married Gore in January 1950. She made appearances with the Ballets Russes, dancing the lead in the opera-ballet Le Coq d'Or (music by Rimsky-Korsakov), and with Les Ballets des Champs-Elysées where she was burnt as a witch in Gore's La Damnée. All in all, Gore created some 20 roles for her in the various companies he led, above all in his short-lived London Ballet. Hinton also spent a considerable time dancing in the Netherlands as well as in Frankfurt, Germany.

In the early 1970s, Hinton returned to England to dance as a guest with the Northern Dance Theatre in Manchester. The ballet, Dance Pictures, was a new work created by Gore for the company and premièred at The Place in London. Gore died in April 1979 while they were in Pamplona, Spain. Hinton attempted to revive Gore's ballets but with limited success. She died in Birkenhead on 5 November 1996, leaving no children.
