= Alexis Rassine =

South African ballet dancer

- Born: Alec Raysman; 26 July 1919; Kaunas, Lithuania
- Died: 25 July 1992 (aged 72)
- Occupation: Ballet dancer

Alexis Rassine (26 July 1919 – 25 July 1992) was a South African ballet dancer who enjoyed his greatest success with the Sadler's Wells Ballet in England in the 1940s and early 1950s. He is remembered as a classical dancer who made "a major contribution to British ballet" during wartime and "helped to keep the flag flying when all about was chaos and disaster."

== Early life and training ==
Rassine was born Alec Raysman (originally Reisman) in Kaunas, Lithuania, to Jewish Russian parents Israel, an engraver and silversmith at the Fabergé workshop, and Sara. His earliest years there involved the family moving around variously between Saint Petersburg and Lithuania, due to the political situation at the time. Raysman was the youngest of three brothers, the others being Max and Joshua. A fourth brother did not survive infancy. Initially, he spoke Russian with his parents and brothers but, in 1929, when he was 10, his family moved to Cape Town, South Africa, where he learned to speak English and gained a new nationality. (In later life, he spoke in a distinctive, high-pitched voice with a mid-European accent offset with South African overtones.) As a youth of 14, he began his dance training with Helen Webb and Maude Lloyd, who soon recognized his unusual talent. Encouraged by them, he left South Africa in 1937, when he was 18, and went to Paris, where he continued his studies with the Russian émigré teachers Olga Preobrajenska and Alexandre Volinine. While still a student, he made his professional stage debut dancing in a ballet at the Bal Tabarin, a glamorous cabaret not far from the Palais Garnier, home of the Paris Opera Ballet.

Upon failing to win a place in the Paris Opera Ballet, Rassine set his sights on London. Arriving there penniless but talented, at a time when male dancers were in short supply, he found teachers willing to give him free tuition, going to Stanislas Idzikowski in the mornings and to Igor Schwezoff in the evenings. He also studied with Vera Volkova at the Sadler's Wells Ballet School. After a brief stint with Ballet Rambert in 1938, he joined a touring ensemble known as the Trois Arts Ballet, where he gained stage experience and learned fragments of the classical repertory.

== Performing career ==
On the first of September 1939, while Rassine was still a member of the Trois Arts company, German troops invaded Poland, whereupon the United Kingdom and France declared war on Germany, an event that was to have a dramatic effect on Rassine's burgeoning career. In late 1940, a group of Polish refugees formed the Anglo-Polish Ballet, specializing in Polish folk dances, and Rassine was invited to join. He soon became the leading classical dancer of the company, performing in Michel Fokine's Les Sylphides and Le Spectre de la Rose with Natalia Rossowska. When Ninette de Valois, director of the Sadler's Wells Ballet, came looking for male dancers to replace losses in her war-ravaged company, she was favorably impressed with Rassine but chose another dancer instead, the diminutive Gordon Hamilton, an Australian character dancer and mime. Subsequently, she had second thoughts and also offered Rassine a contract.

In 1942, Rassine joined the Sadler's Wells Ballet, where he would remain until 1955. He was soon promoted to premier danseur and was cast as partner to ballerinas Nadia Nerina, Pauline Clayden, and Pamela May in Giselle, The Sleeping Beauty, Coppélia, and other classic works. He was particularly noted for dancing the technically demanding role of the Bluebird in The Sleeping Beauty. In the contemporary repertory, he created roles in a number of works by Ninette de Valois, Frederick Ashton, and Robert Helpmann. He danced leading roles in many audience favorites: Harlequin in Fokine's Carnaval, Vestris in de Valois's The Prospect before Us, the Snob in Léonide Massine's La Boutique fantasque, and the Blue Boy in Frederick Ashton's Les Patineurs. His engaging personality made him well suited to lighthearted roles, but he was also adept at characterization in dramatic works. As a solo dancer, he was admired for his smooth, lithe movement, and he was valued by ballerinas such as Margot Fonteyn, Beryl Grey, and Violetta Elvin as an exceptionally able partner. In 1958, he danced Albrecht to the Giselle of the great French ballerina Yvette Chauviré in her guest appearances with the Royal Ballet.

Rassine was also appreciated in his home country. He returned to Cape Town first in 1947, when he was invited to produce and dance in act two of Giselle for the South African National Ballet, then under the direction of Cecily Robinson, with whom he had danced as a student in his youth. He subsequently formed an important partnership with his close friend Nadia Nerina, a South African dancer who had become prima ballerina at the Sadler's Wells Ballet. Together, they toured South Africa and Southern Rhodesia (now Zimbabwe) in 1952, presenting recital programs of pas de deux and solo variations. They danced again in South Africa in 1955, appearing in Giselle with the University of Cape Town Ballet. Although obliged to appear before whites-only audiences, because of the government policy of apartheid, they were motivated by patriotism and a wish to contribute to the cultural life of the country. In later years, neither of them returned to live in their racially fragmented homeland.

After the war in Europe ended in 1945, Rassine faced competition for roles in the Sadler's Wells repertory with the return of such excellent dancers as Michael Somes, Harold Turner, and John Field, but he managed to hold his own until the early 1950s. By 1952, a new generation of male dancers, including the handsome and powerful David Blair, had taken the spotlight on stage at Covent Garden. Rassine was gradually relegated to second or third casts or was left out of new works altogether. By 1954, it was clear that his star had fallen from the Sadler's Wells firmament. He left the company in search of new opportunities, and he found them for a time as a guest with Walter Gore's London Ballet and companies abroad. Eventually, as he was almost forgotten by his former fans, he withdrew from the dance world and went into retirement.

== Roles created ==
- 1942, Hamlet, choreography by Robert Helpmann, music by Pyotr Ilyich Tchaikovsky. Roles: The Ghost of Hamlet's Father and The Player King.
- 1943. Promenade, choreography by Ninette de Valois, music by Franz Joseph Haydn, arranged by Edwin Evans. Role: pas de trois, with Moira Shearer and Ray Powell.
- 1943. The Quest, choreography by Frederick Ashton, music by William Walton. Role: Sansloy, a Saracen knight.
- 1944. Miracle in the Gorbals, choreography by Robert Helpmann, music by Arthur Bliss. Role: The Lover.
- 1946. Les Sirènes, choreography by Frederick Ashton, music by Lord Berners. Role: A Seagull.
- 1946. Adam Zero, choreography by Robert Helpmann, music by Arthur Bliss. Role: An Understudy, the Son, with Gillian Lynn as the Daughter.
- 1946. The Fairy Queen, masque produced by Frederick Ashton and Malcolm Baker-Smith, music by Henry Purcell, adapted by Constant Lambert. Role: Chinese Dancer.
- 1950. Don Quixote, choreography by Ninette de Valois, music by Roberto Gerhard. Role: The Shepherd, in a pas de deux with Pamela May.
- 1953. Homage to the Queen, choreography by Frederick Ashton, music by Malcolm Arnold. Role: Consort of Queen of the Earth.
- 1956. Fireworks, choreography by Kenneth MacMillan, music by Igor Stravinsky. Role: pas de deux with Nadia Nerina.

== Personal and later life ==
Early in his career in England, Rassine formed a deep friendship with John Lehmann, poet and man of letters, recognized today as one of the foremost literary editors of the twentieth century. They were loving companions for many years, from around 1940 until Lehmann's death in 1987. At the height of his success, in the mid-1940s, Rassine decided to have an operation to change the shape of his aquiline nose, which to some extent diminished his outgoing personality. He became a very private, somewhat remote person. In his last years, he lived a solitary life in Crawley, a town in West Sussex, in the cottage left to him by Lehmann. Occasionally, he traveled to the busy Kensington district in west London to teach a few private pupils before returning again to the peace of the countryside. He died at home, at age 83.
