= London Ballet =

British ballet company

London Ballet was a short lived British ballet company founded by the British choreographer and former Ballet Rambert dancer and life partner Antony Tudor in 1938, along with Rambert members Hugh Laing, Andrée Howard, Agnes de Mille, Peggy van Praagh, Maude Lloyd and Walter Gore.

A notable success was La fête étrange, choreographed by Andrée Howard and premiered at the Arts Theatre, London on 23 May 1940. It was based on an episode in Alain Fournier's novel Le Grand Meaulnes, with a significantly adapted libretto by Ronald Crichton, who also chose the six piano pieces and songs used in the score (orchestrated by Guy Warrack). Stage design and costumes were by Sophie Fedorovitch. The piece was so successful that it was taken up by The Royal Ballet in 1958 and has since been performed over 200 times by them and by Scottish Ballet.

With the onset of World War II, in 1940 they were invited to New York, joining Richard Pleasant's and Lucia Chase's reorganized Ballet Theater, which later became the American Ballet Theatre.

In 1961 Walter Gore founded a new company, also called London Ballet. He was its director from 1961 until it closed in 1963.
