= Sally Gilmour =

British ballet dancer

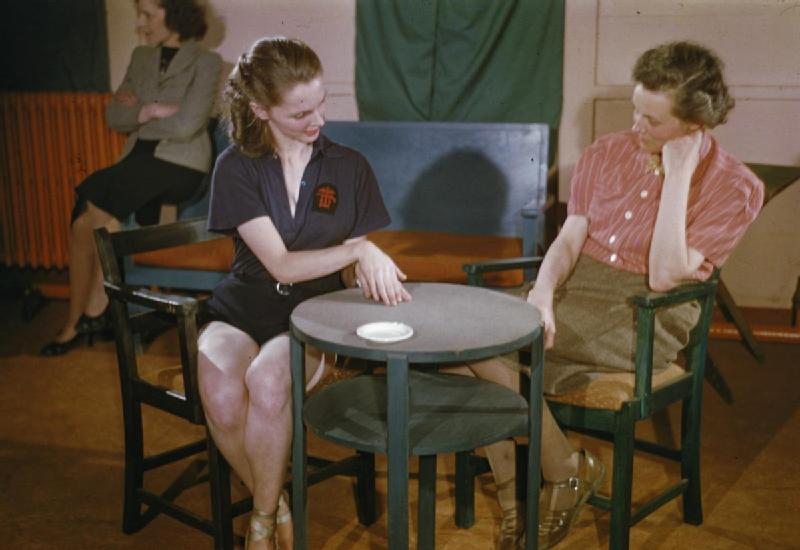
- Sally Gilmour (seated, left)
- Born: Sarah Gilmour; 2 November 1921; Sungai Lembing, Malaya (now Malaysia)
- Died: 23 May 2004 (aged 82); Sydney, Australia
- Occupation: Ballet dancer
- Years active: 1934–1952
- Spouse: Dr Allan Wynn (m. 1949; died 1987)
- Partner: Walter Gore (1940s)
- Children: 2 sons and 1 daughter

Sarah Gilmour (2 November 1921 – 23 May 2004), was a British ballet dancer, and Ballet Rambert's "leading ballerina of the 1940s". The ODNB notes that she was "acclaimed in the 1940s as second only to Margot Fonteyn among British ballerinas".

== Early life ==
Sarah Gilmour was born in Sungai Lembing, Malaya (now Malaysia) on 2 November 1921.

Her father, Colin Gilmour, was the Chief Medical Officer there. Aged four or five, she was sent back to boarding school in London, and only visited her parents every two or three years.

== Career ==
Gilmour enrolled at the Rambert School at the age of 12, and her talent was soon recognised by Marie Rambert. She was trained by the choreographer Antony Tudor and the ballerina Tamara Karsavina.

She was in the original cast of the 1934 ballet Bar aux Folies-Bergère by Ballet Rambert, alongside Alicia Markova, Frederick Ashton, Pearl Argyle, Diana Gould, Elisabeth Schooling and Leslie Edwards Her first important role created specifically by her was the title role of Andrée Howard's 1939 Lady into Fox. It became the role with which she was most closely associated. Howard was unable to dance the part herself due to illness, and Marie Rambert suggested Gilmour. Helped by extensive coaching and Nadia Benois' costume designs, she successfully conveyed the transformation from Mrs Tebrick into a wild vixen.

Ballet Rambert toured Australia from 1947 to 1949. Originally scheduled for six months, it extended to 18, due to the absence of bookings back home and the ending of their Arts Council funding. Marie Rambert considered moving the company there permanently. Gilmour was one of several dancers who decided to stay on in Australia. Another was (later Dame) Margaret Scott, who considered Gilmour's first act of Giselle the greatest ever.

Gilmour returned to London briefly in 1952. Her final performances were in December 1952 at the Lyric Theatre, Hammersmith, in Walter Gore's Confessional.

== Roles created ==
- Maria in Cross-Garter'd (Wendy Toye, 1937)
- Silvia Tebrick in Lady Into Fox (Andrée Howard, 1939)
- Anguished girl of Confessional (Walter Gore, 1941), based on the Browning poem
- Winter Night (Walter Gore, 1948)

== Other roles ==
- Granddaughter in Cap over Mill
- Peter in Peter and the Wolf
- Le Boxing
- Czernyana
- Gala Performance

== Personal life ==
For some years in the 1940s, she was in a relationship with choreographer Walter Gore. In 1949, she married Dr Allan Wynn (he died in 1987), and they had two sons and one daughter together. They moved to London in 1970, and in 1997 Sally Gilmour, now a widow suffering Alzheimer's disease, returned to Australia.

Gilmour died in Sydney, Australia on 23 May 2004, aged 82.
