= Façade (ballet) =

1931 ballet by Frederick Ashton

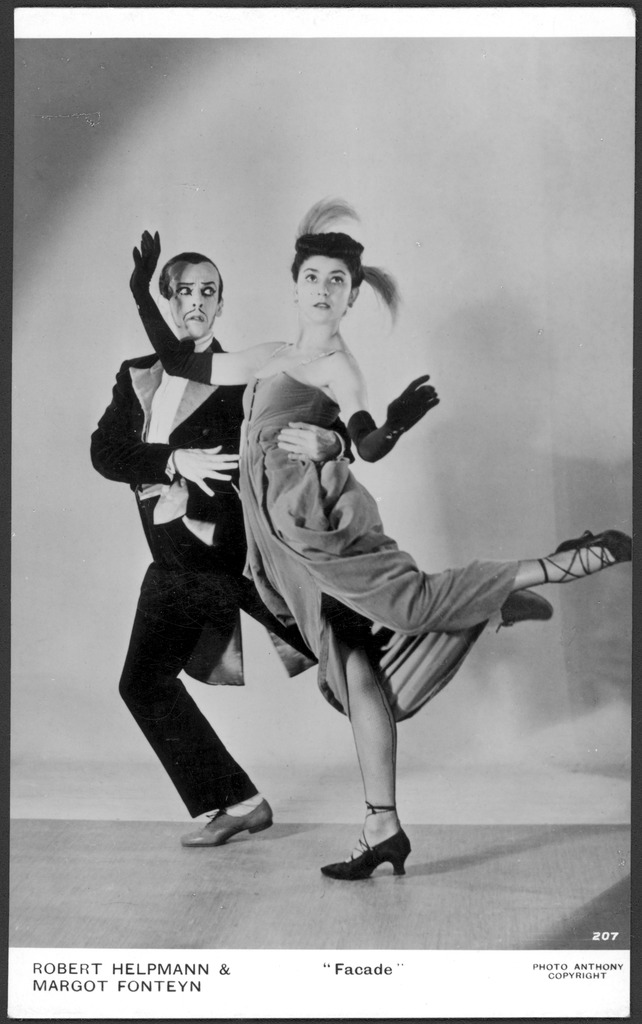
- Robert Helpmann and Margot Fonteyn in Façade
- Choreographer: Frederick Ashton
- Music: William Walton
- Based on: Façade, an Entertainment
- Premiere: 26 April 1931; Cambridge Theatre, London
- Design: John Armstrong

Façade is a ballet choreographed by Frederick Ashton, set to the music of William Walton; it is a balletic interpretation of items from Façade – an Entertainment (1923) by Walton and Edith Sitwell. The ballet was first given by the Camargo Society at the Cambridge Theatre, on 26 April, 1931. It has been regularly revived and restaged all over the world.

== Background ==
In 1923, Façade – an Entertainment was first given in public. It consisted of poems by Edith Sitwell, recited by the author over music composed for the purpose by William Walton, performed by an ensemble of six players. The work was regarded as avant-garde and caused some controversy. In 1926, Walton arranged a suite of five of the numbers, omitting the spoken verses and expanding the orchestration. In 1929, the choreographer Günter Hess created a Façade ballet for the German Chamber Dance Theatre, using Walton's orchestral suite; Sitwell declined to allow her words to be used. Hess visited London in 1930 and is believed to have exchanged ideas with Ashton.

Ashton's ballet was premiered by the Camargo Society, established the previous year to foster the work of British dancers and choreographers. (Note: There were four other items in the programme, two of which were by Ashton (Mars and Venus and "Follow Your Saint": The Passionate Pavane), one by Tamara Karsavina, and one by Ninette de Valois – La création du monde.) The work was set to the five items of Walton's suite, and orchestrations of two other numbers from the original entertainment, which are thought to have been made for the purpose by Constant Lambert, who conducted the premiere.

== Synopsis ==
Façade is a one-act ballet of seven to ten divertissements, described by the ballet critic Debra Crane as "choreographic satires on popular dance forms and their dancers". There is no plot. The numbers as danced in the original production are:

- Scotch Rhapsody
- Jodelling Song
- Polka
- Valse
- Popular Song
- Tango-Pasodoble
- Finale – Tarantella Sevillana.

Ashton revised the ballet over the years. "Country Dance" was added in 1935 and "Noche Espagnola" and "Foxtrot" were added in 1940.

== Original cast ==
- Scotch Rhapsody – Prudence Hyman, Maude Lloyd, Antony Tudor
- Jodelling Song – Lydia Lopokova (milkmaid); Frederick Ashton, William Chappell, Walter Gore (mountaineers)
- Polka – Alicia Markova
- Valse – Pearl Argyle, Diana Gould, Maude Lloyd, Prudence Hyman
- Popular Song – William Chappell, Walter Gore
- Tango-Pasodoble – Lydia Lopokova, Frederick Ashton
- Finale–Tarantella Sevillana – Lydia Lopokova, Frederick Ashton and ensemble

Source: Ashton Archive.

== Critical reception ==
The Times commented that the piece admirably translated the spirit of the original poems, but warned, "If the Ballet is going to laugh at itself so freely, it must take care in future that we do not laugh at it in the wrong place." The paper did not consider Façade the highlight of the quintuple bill in which it appeared: that honour went to "Mme Karsavina's Valse Fantasie with music by Glinka". The Manchester Guardian also rated Karsavina's dance as the best performance of the evening, but praised the wit of Ashton's ballet, and singled out Lopokova for the subtlety of her comic performance. (Note: Karsavina was partnered by Ashton, whose dancing both The Times and The Manchester Guardian singled out for particular praise.)

Reviewing a 2005 production by Scottish Ballet, The Times called Ashton's ballet a masterpiece, and The Guardian commented, "The big treat is the company's acquisition of Frederick Ashton's Façade, a perennial audience favourite. This frothy Bright Young Things frolic, dating from 1931, captures the high spirits of the Brideshead world in sparklingly playful comedic vignettes."

== Revivals ==
The ballet was revived in 1932 at the Savoy Theatre. For a new production by the Vic-Wells Ballet in 1935, Ashton added the Country Dance. Among those appearing in this production were Margot Fonteyn and Robert Helpmann. Ashton further expanded the work in 1940, adding the Foxtrot ("Old Sir Faulk") and the Noche Espagnola ("Nocturne Péruvienne"). These later additions have sometimes been included in and sometimes omitted from the Sadler's Wells (later the Royal Ballet) revivals in 1946, 1949, 1950, 1951, 1956 and 1958–9.

In 1972, Ashton prepared a production for the Aldeburgh Festival using the original chamber score, with Sitwell's verses recited by Peter Pears. This production was later seen in London, at Sadler's Wells Theatre. (Note: This was part of a seventieth birthday tribute to Walton arranged by Benjamin Britten and Pears. For the same event Ashton created a new ballet from Walton's Siesta. When Walton had first adapted the music of the original Façade entertainment into full orchestral versions in the 1920s and 30s, he partly rewrote and expanded some numbers, notably the Tarantella, doubled in length. Using the original Sitwell/Walton text required Ashton to rechoreograph accordingly to fit the reduced length of the music.)

Ashton's ballet has also been revived by the Borovansky Ballet (1946), New Zealand Ballet (1960), PACT Ballet (South Africa, 1966), Joffrey Ballet (1969), Australian Ballet (1972), Chicago Ballet (1975), Houston Ballet (1978), Washington Ballet (1983), Royal Winnipeg Ballet (1984), Ballet of the Teatro Regio, Turin (1992) and Scottish Ballet (2005).

== Notes and references ==
Notes

== Sources ==
- Kennedy, Michael (1989). Portrait of Walton. Oxford: Oxford University Press. ISBN 0-19-816705-9.
