= Pas de quatre (ballet) =

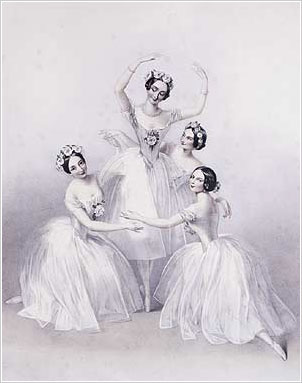
Lithograph of Perrot's Pas de Quatre featuring Carlotta Grisi, Marie Taglioni, Lucille Grahn, and Fanny Cerrito.

Pas de quatre (literally, "step of four") is a French term used to identify a ballet dance for four people. Pas de quatre are usually plotless dances performed as divertissements within the context of a larger work. However, narrative pas de quatre and pas de quatre that stand alone are not unknown.

== Selected works ==
Among the pas de quatre best known in the ballet repertory are the following:

- 1845. Pas de Quatre, choreography by Jules Perrot, music by Cesare Pugni. It was performed by Lucile Grahn, Carlotta Grisi, Fanny Cerrito, and Marie Taglioni, four celebrated ballerinas of the time. Fanny Elssler was invited to take part in its creation but declined to do so. Young Lucile Grahn accepted without hesitation.
- 1895. Swan Lake, act 2, choreography by Lev Ivanov, music by Pyotr Ilyich Tchaikovsky. Danse des petits cygnes (a.k.a. Dance of the Little Swans). With cross-linked hands, the four dancers, usually demi-soloists from the corps de ballet, perform precise and dazzling footwork.
- 1898. Raymonda, choreography by Marius Petipa, music by Alexander Glazunov. Variation pour quatre danseurs, in Pas classique hongrois, act 3. An ebullient quartet, it was first performed by Sergei Legat, Georgi Kyasht, Nikolai Legat, and Alexander Gorsky.
- 1936. Jardin aux Lilas, choreography by Antony Tudor, music by Ernest Chausson. Technically not a pure pas de quatre, as the four characters are accompanied by a corps de ballet. At its premier, the four principals were Maude Lloyd (Caroline), Hugh Laing (Her Lover), Antony Tudor (The Man She Must Marry), and Peggy van Praagh (An Episode in His Past).
- 1949. The Moor's Pavane, choreography by José Limón, music by Henry Purcell. Based on Shakespeare's Othello. The original cast consisted of Limon (The Moor), Betty Jones (Desdemona), Lucas Hoving (Iago), and Pauline Koner (Emilia).
- 1957. Agon, choreography by George Balanchine, music by Igor Stravinsky. Part I consists of a Pas de quatre for four men, a Double pas de quatre for eight women, and a Triple pas de quatre for eight women and four men.
- 1975. The Four Seasons, choreography by Kenneth MacMillan, music by Giuseppe Verdi. "Spring," set to "Primavera" from the ballet Le Quattro Stagioni in act 3 of Verdi's opera I Vespri Siciliani. At its premier, it was danced by Lesley Collier, Michael Coleman, David Ashmole, and Wayne Eagling.

== See also ==
- Grand pas
