= Bar aux Folies-Bergère (ballet) =

Un bar aux Folies Bergère, by Edouard Manet, completed in 1882

Bar aux Folies-Bergère is a one-act ballet created in 1934 with the scenario and choreography by Ninette de Valois. The music consists of piano works of Emmanuel Chabrier selected and arranged by Constant Lambert, and the designs were by William Chappell after Manet.

== Background ==
The Ballet Rambert in 1934 had a dancer, Elisabeth Schooling, who had a very similar appearance to the barmaid in Manet's Un bar aux Folies Bergère. Ashley Dukes, Marie Rambert's husband suggested there might be a ballet around the picture, also introducing can-can dancers. In fact the role was created by Pearl Argyle, but Schooling danced it subsequently. The original owner of Manet's 1882 painting was Chabrier; it now hangs in the Courtauld Institute of Art in London.

Bar aux Folies-Bergère was first performed on 15 May 1934 by Ballet Rambert at the Ballet Club at the Mercury Theatre, Notting Hill, London on a programme with Mermaid and Les Masques by Ashton. The cast included Alicia Markova as the can-can dancer La Goulue, Frederick Ashton as the waiter Valentin le Désossé, Pearl Argyle as the Barmaid, with Diana Gould, Mary Skeaping, Tamara Svetlova and Mona Kimberley (Can-can dancers), William Chappell and Walter Gore (Adolphe and Gustave, habitues of the Bar), Oliver Reynolds (an old man) and Suzette Morfield (a servant). Antony Tudor was the production stage manager. According to the IMDB website, there was a television broadcast of the ballet in 1938, the cast including Schooling, Celia Franca, Sally Gilmour, Gore and Frank Staff.

An early review in The Daily Telegraph praised de Valois's "intelligent and amusing" choreography, and noted the "star" dancing of Markova, the "statuesque" Gould's skills as a "comedienne", and found Ashton's performance and the whole production "deliciously gay". Cyril Beaumont commended the way in which the choreographer had made "a succession of appropriate and reasonable incidents which afforded excuse for dancing and mime. He noted Markova's "piquant and harmless" La Goulue which she did with "such artless naughtiness, and with so engaging an air, as to be irresistible", while Ashton was "brilliant ... dapper, suave, deft, lively as quicksilver".

It was the only work choreographed by de Valois for the Rambert company, was included in the repertoire when the company toured France in 1937, and was performed regularly by them until the late 1940s. The last recorded performance on the Ballet Rambert archive is in Brighton in November 1952.

== Synopsis ==
The ballet springs from the image of Manet's late masterpiece Un bar aux Folies Bergère. The curtain opens on the barmaid looking into space then busying herself wiping off bottles and glasses. Adolphe and Gustave enter and orders drinks. A waiter, Valentin, is in love with the barmaid, whom he persuades to come from behind the counter to dance with him. When the can-can dancers appear (entering through the audience, as at the real Folies Bergère) and dance, she retreats behind the bar again. When La Goulue does her turn, Valentin becomes besotted with her, breaking the heart of the barmaid, who, after everyone has left and the cleaner starts her work, finally resumes the pose of Manet's painting.

The music was chosen by Constant Lambert from the ten Pièces pittoresques of 1881 by Chabrier. Some of the movements were slightly altered by Lambert – such as "Mélancolie" and "Tourbillon", or cut, as in "Idylle", "Scherzo-valse" and "Danse villageoise" (used as the overture).

Valois's 36-page loose-leaf notebook describing the choreography with comments by Rambert is kept in the archives of the Rambert Dance Company.

== See also ==
- List of ballets by title
- List of historical ballet characters
