= Simple Symphony (Walter Gore ballet) =

Simple Symphony is a ballet created in 1944 by the British choreographer Walter Gore to Benjamin Britten's Simple Symphony.

In 1944, whilst on leave from Army duty in France, Gore created the work for the Ballet Rambert. The work was largely created for Sally Gilmour and Margaret Scott.
