= Elisabeth Schooling =

British ballet dancer

- Born: 27 April 1915; Hendon, London, England
- Died: 22 June 1998 (aged 83); Exeter, England
- Occupation: Ballet dancer

Elisabeth Schooling (27 April 1915 – 22 June 1998) was a British ballet dancer.

== Early life ==
Elisabeth Schooling was born in Hendon, London in 1915.

== Career ==
Un bar aux Folies Bergère, now in the Courtauld Institute of Art, London

From 1928, Schooling studied with Marie Rambert, and she danced in Ballet Club's (which later became Ballet Rambert) first seasons. Her first solo role was as the Bride in a 1934 ballet entitled Mermaid, which was choreographed by Susan Salaman and Andrée Howard, using music by Ravel.

Also in 1934, it was noticed that Schooling had a very similar appearance to the barmaid in Édouard Manet’s painting Un bar aux Folies Bergère. Marie Rambert’s husband Ashley Dukes suggested there might be a ballet around the picture, also introducing can-can dancers. Bar aux Folies-Bergère was first performed on 15 May 1934 at the Mercury Theatre, Notting Hill, London. Although the role was created by Pearl Argyle, Schooling danced it subsequently.

In 1938, her future husband Frank Staff did his first choreography for Ballet Rambert, in The Tartans, a new version of Frederick Ashton's ballet of the same name, for three dancers, being himself, Schooling and Walter Gore, with music by Boyce.

In 1939, Staff created Czernyana which used Czerny's piano exercises as the basis for a series of dances which caricatured different ballet styles. Its success led to Czerny 2 in 1941. Schooling had solos in both. Czernyana, a compilation of the best of both ballets featured in the Rambert repertory for many years.

== Personal life ==
Schooling finally married her fellow Ballet Rambert dancer Frank Staff in 1942, having appeared in his early choreographed works. She retired in 1948, and they had one son together, although the marriage was eventually dissolved. Schooling later married the Devon farmer, Michael Chaplin. After he moved back to South Africa, Staff married the dancer Heather Lloyd-Jones, although they later divorced.
