= Bluebird Pas de Deux =

- by Igor Stravinsky
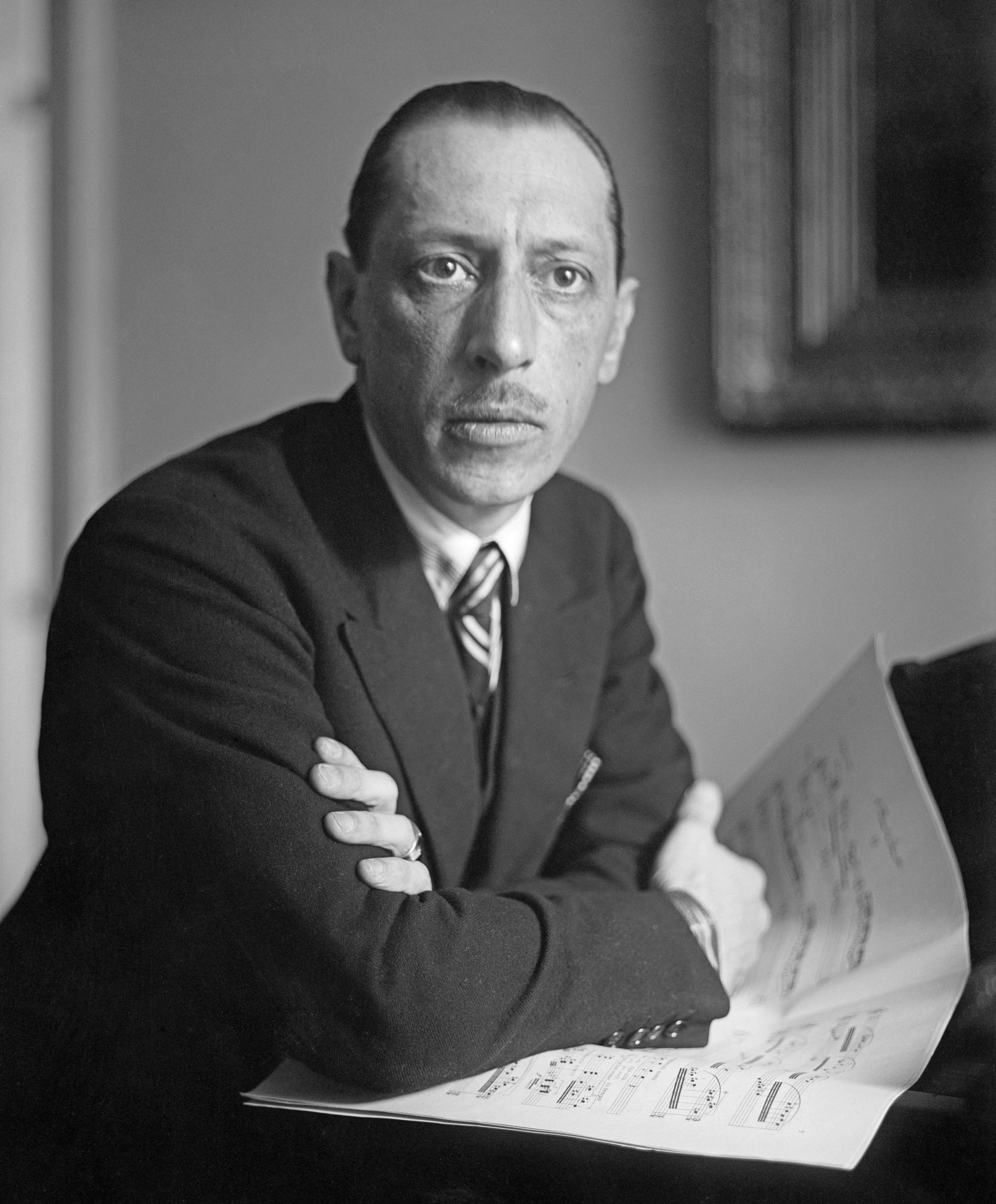
- Igor Stravinsky
- Composed: 1941
- Duration: 6 minutes
- Movements: 4
- Scoring: Chamber orchestra

Bluebird Pas de Deux is a 1941 arrangement for chamber orchestra of a short section of Pyotr Ilyich Tchaikovsky's The Sleeping Beauty composed by Igor Stravinsky. It was used in Lucia Chase's Bluebird ballet.

== Composition ==
This arrangement was initially commissioned by Lucia Chase, the founding director of the Ballet Theatre, in January 1941. The commission called for a short arrangement of the four parts of No. 25, Pas de deux de l'Oiseau bleu et la Princesse Florine, in Act III of Tchaikovsky's The Sleeping Beauty. Though, initially, Tchaikovsky intended this to be a pas de quatre, Marius Petipa changed it in the original production, hence Stravinsky's title. This was Stravinsky's first commission as an expatriate in the United States. Stravinsky re-scored the piece in a few days and, according to his confidant Robert Craft, he enjoyed his work.

Given the fact that only portions of the score had gotten to the United States by this time, and were only available in the form of piano reductions, this was a re-orchestration on the part of Stravinsky, which is why it is often entitled a "re-scoring" by other Stravinsky experts. This was not the first time Stravinsky orchestrated a segment from The Sleeping Beauty, as he also orchestrated a very brief solo variation in Act II (No. 15b) and the Entr'acte that opened the following scene (No. 18). On this occasion, the arrangement was composed as commissioned by Sergei Diaghilev. However, in the case of Bluebird, Stravinsky had to adapt to the company's orchestra's condition, as it had been depleted by the military draft just months before the US involvement in World War II.

Bluebird Pas de Deux was eventually published by Schott Music and, later, by Chester Music.

== Structure ==
As in the original, this short ballet consists of four movements:

1. Adagio
2. Variation I. Tempo di valse
3. Variation II. Andantino
4. Coda. Con moto

Bluebird Pas de Deux is scored for a large ensemble consisting of a flute, an oboe, two clarinets, a bassoon, a French horn, two trumpets, two trombones, timpani, and a string section consisting of five violins, four violas, three cellos and two double basses. As an original addition, Stravinsky did not actually reduce the orchestra, but rather chose to include a piano to provide a new element to help articulation and sonority. According to Stravinsky himself, "the prominent piano part [...] helps to conceal the small number of strings" in Bluebird Pas de Deux.

== Recordings ==
This is one of the least published and performed pieces by Stravinsky. Following is a short list of recordings of this piece:

- Robert Craft recorded the piece with the Twentieth Century Classics Ensemble at the American Academy of Arts and Letters in New York City on October 28, 2008. The recording was released in 2011 by Naxos Records.
