= Frank Staff =

South African ballet dancer and choreographer

- Born: 15 June 1918; Kimberley, South Africa
- Died: 10 May 1971 (aged 52); Bloemfontein, South Africa
- Occupations: Ballet dancer and choreographer

Frank Staff (15 June 1918 – 10 May 1971) was a South African ballet dancer, choreographer, producer, and company director. He was a major figure in the history of European theatrical dance in South Africa.

== Early life ==
Frank Cedric Staff was born to an Irish mother and an English father in the diamond mining town of Kimberley, in what is now the Northern Cape province of South Africa. As a teenager, he moved to Cape Town, where he attended Diocesan College and received his early dance training from Helen Webb and Maude Lloyd, who had studied with Marie Rambert in London. After Lloyd returned to England in 1933, she encouraged her young pupil to join her. At age fifteen, Staff moved to London to continue his training at Rambert's school in Bedford Gardens.

== Career ==
Staff was soon invited to join Rambert's Ballet Club, as her performing group was then called. For the next twelve years, from 1933 to 1945, he worked with the Rambert company as both a dancer and choreographer. Except for two seasons with the Vic-Wells Ballet, 1934/35 and 1938/39, and a brief stint with Walter Gore's London Ballet in 1940, he was a featured performer and choreographer with Ballet Rambert.

=== Dancer ===
Staff inherited many of Hugh Laing's roles in the Rambert repertory, including The Lover in Jardin aux Lilas and Mercury in The Planets, both works by Antony Tudor. He also danced in several ballets by Frederick Ashton, among them Recamier, Façade, and Mephisto Valse. For the Vic-Wells company, he appeared as Horn Blower in The Rake's Progress by Ninette de Valois and created the role of Cupid in Ashton's Cupid and Psyche (1939). For the London Ballet, he created the role of The Boy, Julien, in La Fête Ėtrange (1940), set to music of Gabriel Fauré by Andrée Howard. Other roles in his varied repertory included The Poet in Les Sylphides, the Spectre in Le Spectre de la Rose, and Harlequin in Le Carnaval, all choreographed by Michel Fokine. He also danced such different roles as Bluebird in The Sleeping Beauty, by Petipa; the Faun in Afternoon of a Faun, by Nijinsky; and Death in Death and the Maiden, by Howard.

He also danced on the BBC production "The Mercury Ballet".

=== Choreographer ===
Staff's first choreographic work, The Tartans, was a new version of Ashton's ballet of the same name. A pas de trois for himself, his wife Elisabeth Schooling, and Walter Gore, set to music by William Boyce, it was made for Ballet Rambert in 1938. Over the next two years, he contributed three of his best works to the company's repertory: Czernyana (1939), to the piano exercises of Carl Czerny; Enigma Variations (1939), to the score by Edward Elgar; and Peter and the Wolf (1940), to the music and text of Sergei Prokofiev. All these works displayed his facility for witty invention that would characterize many of his later ballets. He also created Czerny 2 (1941), a second version of his popular hit, a series of dances caricaturing different kinds of ballet. Combined with its predecessor under the title Czernyana, it remained in the Rambert repertory for many years. During the war years in England—September 1939 to May 1945—Staff served as a captain in the Argyle and Sutherland Highlanders but was released temporarily to choreograph Peter and the Wolf and Czerny 2.

Upon completion of his military service, Staff returned to his homeland in 1946 and joined the South African National Ballet in Cape Town. There he danced in his own ballets and produced works in which he had appeared in England, notably Nijinsky's L'Après-midi d'un Faune and Howard's Death and the Maiden. Returning to Britain in 1947, Staff spent the next few years as an international freelance. He served as resident choreographer of the Metropolitan Ballet (1947–1948), toured Australia with Ballet Rambert (1948), toured the United States and Canada with Sadler's Wells Ballet (1949), and was subsequently appointed ballet master and choreographer at the Empire Theatre (1950) on London's Leicester Square. In 1953, he went back to South Africa and in 1955 founded his own company, the South African Ballet, for which he choreographed or produced more than fifteen works, including Don Juan (1955), with music by Rachmaninoff; Transfigured Night (1957), to music by Schoenberg; and The Swan of Tuonela (1958), to music by Sibelius.

In 1963, the South African government established four professional ballet companies, one in each of the four provinces, and Staff would eventually work with them all: the companies of the Cape Performing Arts Board (CAPAB Ballet), the Natal Performing Arts Council (NAPAC Ballet), the Performing Arts Council of the Transvaal (PACT Ballet), and the Performing Arts Council of the Orange Free State (PACOFS Ballet). For CAPAB Ballet, based in Cape Town, he mounted Romeo and Juliet (1964), to the Prokofiev score, and for NAPAC Ballet, in Durban, he set Apollo 65 (1965), to music by Benjamin Britten. Moving on to the Transvaal in 1966, he worked in Johannesburg until 1968 as resident producer and choreographer with PACT Ballet under the direction of Faith de Villiers. These years were especially productive. Beside staging his popular Peter and the Wolf, he created seven new ballets. Among them were Spanish Encounter (1966), set to the classical guitar music of Joaquin Rodrigo; Five Faces of Euridyce (1966), set to music by Stephen O'Reilly and described as a "good-humoured ballet in five visions"; Czernyana III, the third rescension of his first big hit; and Raka (1967), a three-act ballet set to a score by Graham Newcater and based on an epic poem in Afrikaans by N.P. van Wyk Louw. Raka proved such a success that it was soon made into a film that was distributed worldwide by Twentieth Century Fox.

Thereafter, Staff was artistic director of PACOFS Ballet in Bloemfontein from 1969 until his death in 1971. Among the six ballets he created for this company were two notable works made in 1970: Mantis Moon, based on a Bushman legend and set to music by Hans Maske, and Séance, derived from Menotti's opera The Medium but set to music by Britten. Staff's unfinished work, The Rain Queen (1971), set to a commissioned score by Newcater, was planned as the first full-length ballet with an indigenous South African theme. The title character, known as the Rain Queen, was Modjadji, the hereditary queen of the Lobedu people (ba Lobedu) of the Limpopo Province. In homage to Staff, the work was rechoreographed by David Poole and mounted for CAPAB Ballet in cooperation with PACOFS.

== Personal life ==
Staff married four times. He wed his fellow Ballet Rambert dancer Elisabeth Schooling in 1942, and she danced in many of his early works. He next married English dancer Jaqueline St. Clere, followed by South African musical comedy actress Heather Lloyd-Jones. All three of these marriages ended in divorce. Staff's fourth wife was South African dancer Veronica Paeper, who became a prolific choreographer in her own right as director of CAPAB Ballet, later known as Cape Town City Ballet. Each of Staff's four wives bore him a son.
