= Simple Symphony =

Composition by Benjamin Britten

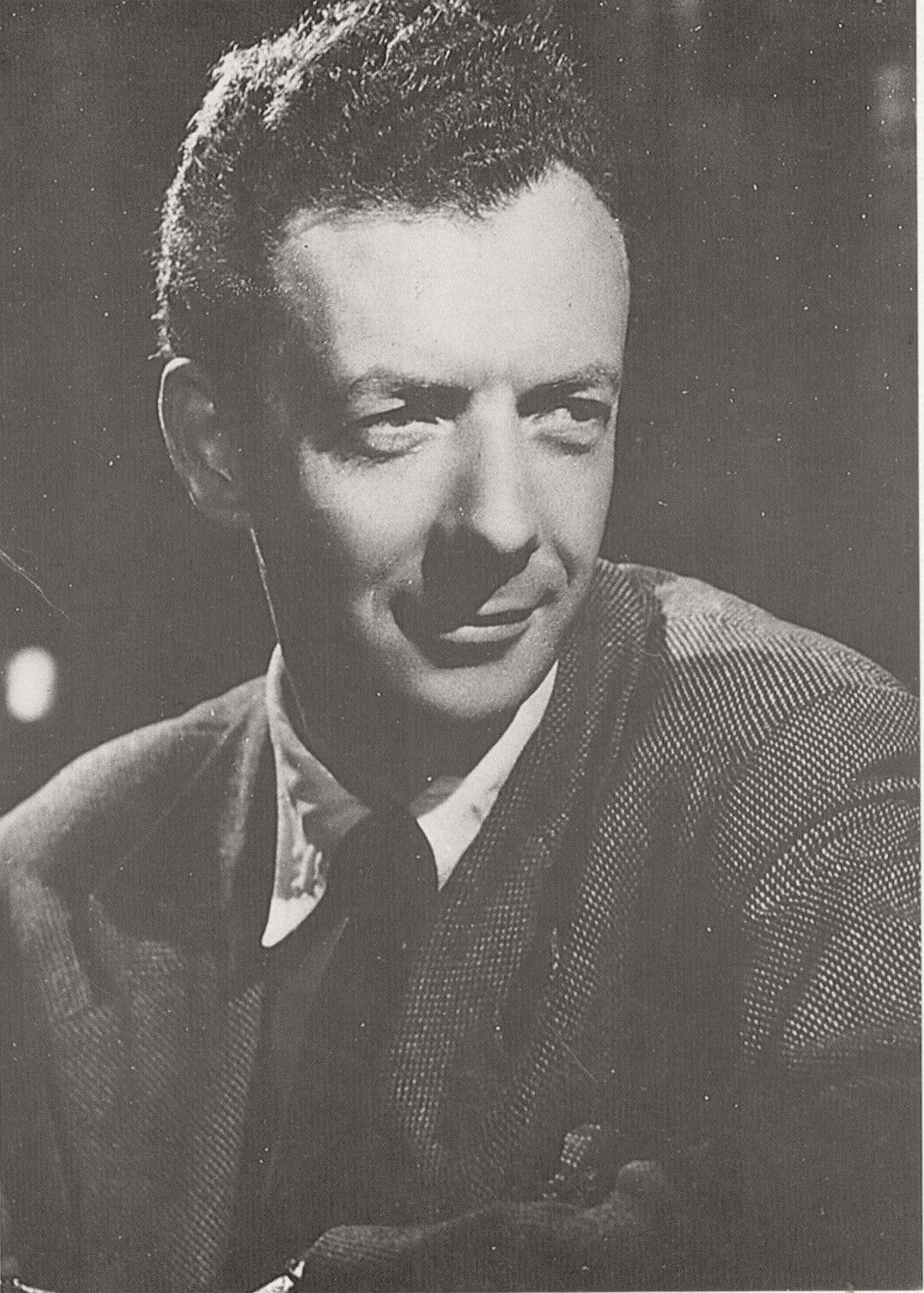
Benjamin Britten in the 1940s

The Simple Symphony, Op. 4, is a work for string orchestra or string quartet by Benjamin Britten. It was written between December 1933 and February 1934 in Lowestoft, using material that the composer had written as a child, between 1923 and 1926. It received its first performance in 1934 at Stuart Hall in Norwich, with Britten conducting an amateur orchestra.

The piece is dedicated to Audrey Alston (Mrs Lincolne Sutton), Britten's childhood viola teacher. The piece is based on eight themes which Britten wrote during his childhood (two per movement) and for which he had a particular fondness. He completed his final draft of this piece at age twenty.

== Instrumentation ==
- 1st violins
- 2nd violins
- Violas
- Cellos
- Double basses

== Borrowed themes ==
The symphony has four movements, each quoting themes from two earlier works by Britten:

1. Boisterous Bourrée
  – Suite No. 1 in E for piano (18 October 1925), second movement (Bourrée: Allegro vivace)
  – Song (Song) (1923) A Country Dance ('Now the King is home again'), text from Tennyson's The Foresters, for voice and piano.
2. Playful Pizzicato
  – Scherzo (piano) (1924) Sonata for piano in B♭ major, op. 5, Scherzo and Trio (Molto vivace)
  – Song (1924) The Road Song of the "Bandar-Log" ('Here we go in a flung festoon', text by Rudyard Kipling), for voice and piano.
3. Sentimental Sarabande
  – Suite No. 3 (for piano) (1925) Suite No. 3, in F♯ minor, for piano, op. 25, Prelude (Allegro di molto)
  – Waltz for piano (1923) [Waltz in B major for piano], (Tempo di valse)
4. Frolicsome Finale
  – Piano Sonata No. 9 (1926) Piano Sonata No. 9, in C♯ minor, op. 38, Finale
  – Song (1925)

The entire piece lasts about 20 minutes. The pizzicato in the second movement makes it popular with mandolin players. Prominent in this popular theme are eight notes which sound familiar as echoing the opening of "Barwick Green", the theme music to the long-running BBC Radio 4 programme, The Archers, written in 1924 by Arthur Wood. The third movement samples a traditional Swedish melody heard also in the popular Christian hymn “How Great Thou Art”.

== Later uses ==
In 1944, the choreographer Walter Gore created a ballet also entitled Simple Symphony for the Ballet Rambert.

Many themes of the symphony are also used for the soundtrack Bad Blood (1986) by Leos Carax. It appears in Wes Anderson's film Moonrise Kingdom (2012), which prominently features many pieces by Britten. It also appears in the first two seasons of The Marvelous Mrs. Maisel (2017-2018).
