= Pas de trois =

Ballet dance for three dancers

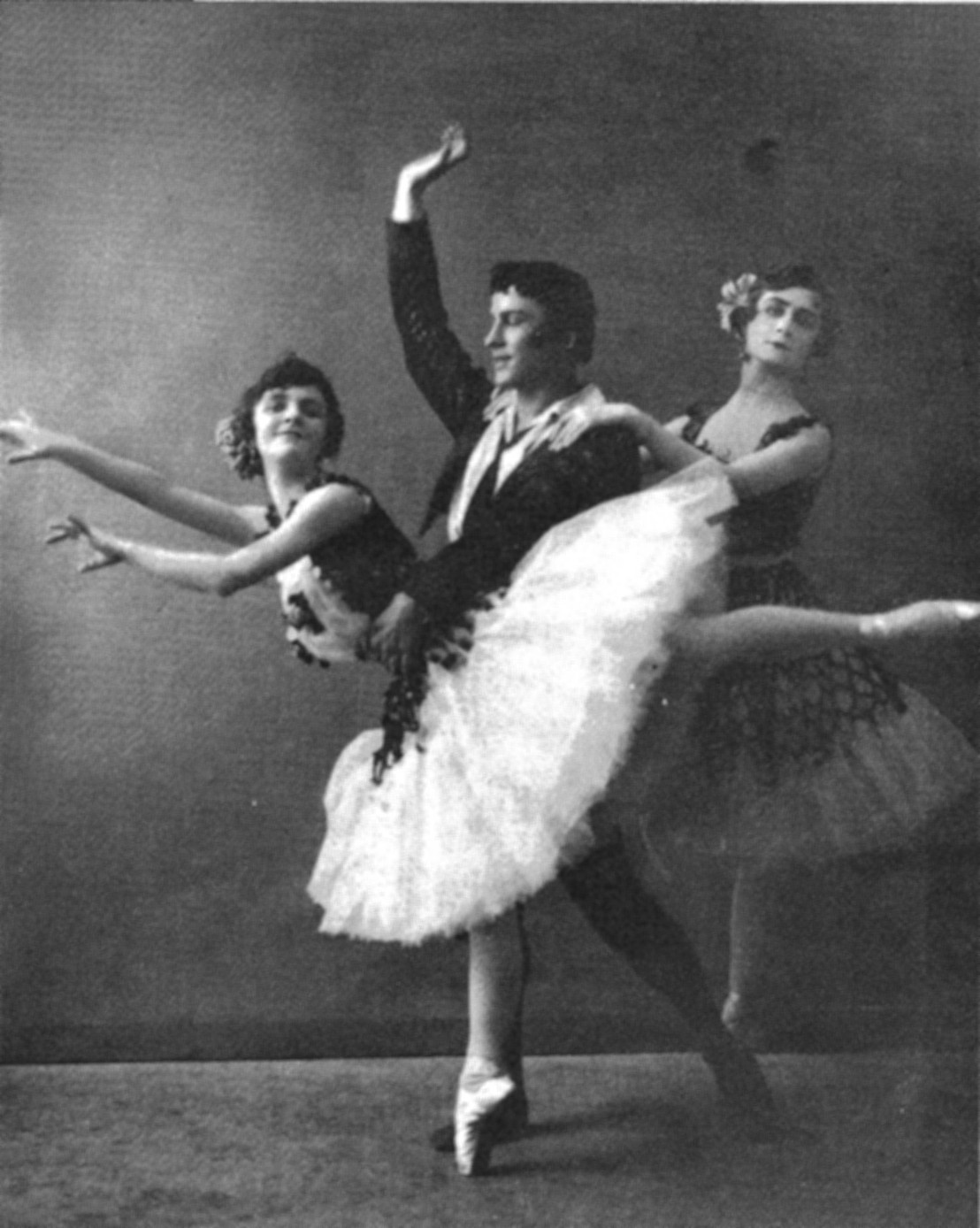
(left to right) Elsa Vill, Pierre Vladimirov, and Elizaveta Gerdt in the Paquita Pas de trois (or Minkus Pas de trois), St. Petersburg, 1909

In ballet, pas de trois [pɑ də tʁwɑ] is a French term usually referring to a dance between three people. Typically, a pas de trois in ballet consists of five parts:

1. Entrée (the opening number for the three dancers, usually preceded by a short introduction)
2. Variation (or solo) for the 1st dancer
3. Variation for the 2nd dancer
4. Variation for the 3rd dancer
5. Coda (a finale usually set to music of a quick tempo in which the dancers bring the piece to a spectacular finish)

Today, the most celebrated pas de trois in the classical ballet repertory are derived from the works of the great choreographer Marius Petipa. Although the balletmaster created many pas de trois for the near 150 ballets he created throughout his career in Russia, only three survive: the Pas de trois des Odalisques from his revival of the ballet Le Corsaire (set to the music of Adolphe Adam and Cesare Pugni, choreographed for three women); the Paquita Pas de trois added to his 1881 revival of the ballet Paquita (set to the music of Ludwig Minkus and Eduard Deldevez, sometimes referred to as the Golden Pas de trois or Minkus Pas de trois, and choreographed for two women and one man); and the Pas de trois from the first act of his 1895 revival of the ballet Swan Lake (choreographed for two women and one man).

Typically, Petipa fashioned the Entrée of a pas de trois in such a way so that the dancer who performs the first variation exits the stage about three-quarters of the way through in order to rest and prepare for their solo.

== See also ==
- Pas de deux
- Pas de quatre
- Grand pas
