= Nadia Nerina =

South African dancer (1927–2008)

- Born: Nadine Judd; 21 October 1927; Bloemfontein, South Africa
- Died: 6 October 2008 (aged 80); Beaulieu-sur-Mer, Provence-Alpes-Côte d'Azur, France
- Occupations: Ballet dancer; prima ballerina
- Spouse: Charles Gordon (m. 1956–2008)

Nadia Nerina (21 October 1927 – 6 October 2008) was a South African dancer who was "one of the most gifted, versatile, and inspiring ballerinas of The Royal Ballet" during the 1950s and 1960s. She was known "for her technical virtuosity, lightness afoot, effortless-seeming jumps, and joyful charm onstage, especially in comedic roles."

== Early life and training ==
Born as Nadine Judd in Bloemfontein, the provincial capital of the Orange Free State (now Free State Province) in central South Africa, she was a descendant of British settlers who had immigrated to the diamond-rich area in search of a new life. Her parents, who were in the English-speaking minority of the city, where Afrikaans was the official language, encouraged her childhood interest in theater. Her first stage appearance was at the age of 8 or 9, when she appeared as Cio-Cio San's child in a local production of Madama Butterfly. Her serious study of dance did not come until after her parents moved the family to Durban, the major city in the coastal province of Natal (now KwaZulu-Natal). There she studied drama with Elizabeth Sneddon at Natal University, ballet with Eileen Keegan, a gifted teacher who had danced with Anna Pavlova's company, and stagecraft and mime with Dorothea McNair. Keegan is credited with laying the foundations of Nerina's strong classical ballet technique. After Judd's mother died, while she was in her early teens, her teachers advised her father to send their talented pupil to England for further instruction.

In 1945, not long after World War II had ended in Europe, Mr. Judd arranged passage for his daughter on a ship sailing from Cape Town to Southampton. She was 17 or 18 at the time. Once settled in London, with aspirations to join Ballet Rambert, she sought out and took classes with Marie Rambert, who befriended her and encouraged her. She then went on to the Sadler's Wells Ballet School, under the direction of Ninette de Valois, and to the studio of Elsa Brunelleschi, where she studied Spanish dancing. While still a student at Sadler's Wells, she appeared as a nursemaid to the baby Princess Aurora in the famous production of The Sleeping Beauty mounted for the reopening of the Royal Opera House on 20 February 1946. The following summer, intent on improving her classical technique, she went to Paris with her friend Elaine Fifield, to study with Olga Preobrajenska, a former star of the Russian Imperial Ballet in Saint Petersburg.

== Professional career ==
Upon returning to England in the autumn, Judd danced briefly with the Sadler's Wells Opera Ballet, which soon was reformed and renamed the Sadler's Wells Theatre Ballet. There, under the guidance of ballet mistress Peggy van Praagh, she worked with Leo Kersley, who became a close friend, Kenneth MacMillan, Peter Darrell, and emergent choreographer John Cranko, a fellow South African. At this time, she assumed the stage name Nadia Nerina, derived from the delicate, lily-like flowers called nerines, a species native to South Africa. Cast as the Circus Dancer in Andrée Howard's Mardi Gras, she enjoyed her first big success, winning approval of balletomanes and applause from audiences whenever she appeared. In December 1947, she joined the main Sadler's Wells company at Covent Garden as a soloist. Within three days, she was on stage, dancing a solo in Michel Fokine's Les Sylphides. Set to Chopin's Mazurka in D Major (op. 33, no. 2), it showed her light, high jumps, fleet footwork, and soft port de bras to particular advantage. Soon thereafter, de Valois saw her in a solo in the Swan Lake pas de trois, which she had learned from Preobrajenska, and, recognizing her individuality, encouraged her in what Nerina described as "my natural style."

Thereafter, her progress was swift, as one good role followed another. In 1952, at age 25, she was promoted to principal dancer, having become "a distinctly bright light within the company's remarkably luminous roster of ballerinas, which included Moira Shearer, Margot Fonteyn, Svetlana Beriosova, and Antoinette Sibley." Over the next decade and a half, she danced leading roles in many works in the Sadler's Wells repertory, the great nineteenth-century classics as well as works created by contemporary dancemakers. She was a favorite of Frederick Ashton, chief choreographer of the company, who cast her in new works, such as Homage to the Queen and Birthday Offering, as well as in existing productions of Cinderella, Sylvia, and Ondine. In Homage to the Queen, he made a solo variation for her that included entrechats six and double tours en l'air, feats usually performed by men, and in Birthday Offering, he again exploited her aerial abilities in a series of soaring jumps. Her acting talent was also admired by Kenneth MacMillan, who in 1956 cast her in his first ballet, Noctambules, a dark tale of a hypnotist in which she played a veiled, aged woman pursued by four suitors when she is restored to her youthful beauty. Such dramatic roles were not her forte, however, as her sunny disposition and dazzling technique made her more suitable to lively roles and classical brilliance.

The year 1960 was a banner one for Nerina. On 28 January, she appeared with the Royal Ballet (so called since 1956) in the role with which she would thereafter be most closely identified, that of Lise in Ashton's La Fille Mal Gardée ("the poorly guarded girl"). Based on an old French tale of a widow and her wayward daughter, Ashton's reworking of Jean Dauberval's 1789 ballet was an immediate hit. The three scenes were set in the widow's farmyard, at a nearby field, and in the living room of the farmhouse. The charming décor and costumes were designed by Osbert Lancaster, and the choreography was set to a melodious new score arranged and orchestrated by John Lanchbery. Besides Nerina in the title role, it starred David Blair as Colas, her sweetheart; Stanley Holden en travestie as her mother, the Widow Simone; and Alexander Grant as Alain, her hapless suitor. Ashton called them his "ideal cast," and, although they have since been succeeded by numerous others, it is doubtful that they have ever, as a quartet, been surpassed. After its premiere, Ashton's bucolic comedy was described as "an unabashedly lyrical, bravura showcase for pixieish (5 feet, 4 inches, 105 pounds) Nadia Nerina." It was declared a signal success, even called a masterpiece, and has since entered the contemporary canon, in no small measure because of its original leading lady.

Nerina was also well known outside England. In the early 1950s, she toured South Africa several times, presenting recital programs with fellow South African Alexis Rassine and starring with him in a local production of Giselle in Cape Town. With the Sadler's Wells company (later the Royal Ballet), she toured Europe and North America on many occasions. She was particularly popular in France, where she was applauded for her performances in Massine's Mam'zelle Angot and Cranko's Bonne-Bouche, both with a distinctly Gallic flavor. She was also warmly appreciated by Scottish audiences in Edinburgh and Glasgow, where she often performed during the Sadler's Wells Ballet tours in the 1950s. In 1960, after her January triumph at Covent Garden, she was invited to perform as guest ballerina with both the Bolshoi Ballet in Moscow and the Kirov Ballet in Leningrad. Partnered by Nikolai Fadeyechev in Swan Lake in Moscow in 1960 and by Konstantin Sergeyev in Giselle in Leningrad in 1961, she won acclaim in both ballet-loving cities. She was also well loved in America. In 1964, she represented Great Britain at the commemoration performance for slain president John F. Kennedy at the White House in Washington, D.C.

In 1965, Nerina asked Ashton, then director of the Royal Ballet, to be designated a "guest artist," to enable her to pursue invitations from other companies. Among them was Western Theatre Ballet, based in Bristol, where she created a major role in Peter Darrell's Home, about a young woman in an asylum. She made guest appearances with the Royal Ballet until 1968, dancing in La Fille Mal Gardée and Sylvia, and she was a popular star at ballet galas, usually giving her fees to dancers' benevolent funds. After her retirement in 1969, she became a patron of the Cecchetti Society, which preserves the Italian teaching system on which British ballet was founded.

== Roles created ==
Among the soloist or principal roles created by Nerina are the following.

- 1946, Mardi Gras choreography by Andrée Howard, music by Leonard Salzedo. Role: The Circus Dancer.
- 1948. Cinderella, choreography by Frederick Ashton, music by Sergei Prokofiev. Role: The Fairy Spring.
- 1953. Homage to the Queen, choreography by Frederick Ashton, music by Malcolm Arnold. Role: Queen of the Earth.
- 1955. Variations on a Theme by Purcell, choreography by Frederick Ashton, music by Benjamin Britten. Role: principal dancer.
- 1956. Birthday Offering, choreography by Frederick Ashton, music by Alexander Glazunov. Role: principal dancer.
- 1956. Noctambules, choreography by Kenneth MacMillan, music by Humphrey Searle. Role: The Faded Beauty.
- 1956. Fireworks, choreography by Kenneth MacMillan, music by Igor Stravinsky. Role: pas de deux with Alexis Rassine.
- 1960. La Fille Mal Gardée, choreography by Frederick Ashton, music by Ferdinand Hérold, arranged and orchestrated by John Lanchbery. Role: Lise, the wayward daughter.
- 1963. Elektra, choreography by Robert Helpmann, music by Malcolm Arnold. Role: Elektra, daughter of Agamemnon.
- 1965. Home, choreography by Peter Darrell, music by Béla Bartók. Role: principal dancer.

== Other roles ==
Among the many roles in Nerina's repertory are the following.

- Les Sylphides, choreography by Michel Fokine, music by Frédéric Chopin. Roles: Mazurka and Valse.
- Le Carnaval, choreography by Michel Fokine, music by Robert Schumann, orchestrated by Alexander Glazunov. Role: Papillon.
- Le Spectre de la Rose, choreography by Michel Fokine, music by Carl Maria von Weber. Role: The Young Girl.
- La Boutique Fantasque, choreography by Léonide Massine, music by Gioachino Rossini, orchestrated by Ottorino Respighi. Role: Can-Can Dancer.
- Mam'zelle Angot, choreography by Léonide Massine, music by Charles Lecocq and Gordon Jacob. Role: Mam'zelle Angot.
- Cinderella, choreography by Frederick Ashton, music by Sergei Prokofiev. Role: Cinderella.
- Façade, choreography by Frederick Ashton, music by William Walton. Roles: Polka and Tango Pasodoble.
- A Wedding Bouquet, choreography by Frederick Ashton, music by Lord Berners. Role: Julia.
- The Sleeping Beauty, traditional choreography by Marius Petipa, with additions by Frederick Ashton and Ninette de Valois, music by Pyotr Ilyich Tchaikovsky. Role: Princess Aurora.
- Le Lac des Cygnes (The Swan Lake), traditional choreography by Marius Petipa and Lev Ivanov, music by Pyotr Ilyich Tchaikovsky. Roles: Odette and Odile.
- Sylvia, choreography by Frederick Ashton, music by Léo Delibes. Role: Sylvia.
- Bonne-Bouche: A Cautionary Tale, choreography by John Cranko, music by Arthur Oldham. Role: The Daughter.
- Coppélia, traditional choreography by Arthur Saint-Léon, music by Léo Delibes. Role: Swanilda (aka Swanhilde).
- Giselle, traditional choreography by Jean Coralli and Jules Perrot, music by Adolphe Adam. Role: Giselle.
- Ondine, choreography by Frederick Ashton, music by Habs Wernet Henze. Role: Ondine.
- Petrouchka, choreography by Michel Fokine, music by Igor Stravinsky. Role: The Ballerina.
- The Firebird, choreography by Michel Fokine, music by Igor Stravinsky. Role: The Firebird.
- Don Quixote pas de deux (act 3), traditional choreography by Marius Petipa, music by Ludwig Minkus. Role: Kitri.
- The Dragonfly, choreography by Anna Pavlova, music by Fritz Kreisler. Role: The Dragonfly.
- The Dying Swan, choreography by Michel Fokine, music by Camille Saint-Saēns. Role: The Swan.
- Afternoon of a Faun, choreography by Jerome Robbins, music by Claude Debussy. Role: The Girl.
- Serenade, choreography by George Balanchine, music by Pyotr Ilyich Tchaikovsky. Role: principal dancer.
- Ballet Imperial, choreography by George Balanchine, music by Pyotr Ilyich Tchaikovsky. Role: principal dancer.

== Personal life ==
In the early 1960s, Nerina was widely regarded as the rightful successor to the aging Margot Fonteyn as the leading ballerina of the Royal Ballet. Her career path was diverted, however, by the defection of the young Rudolf Nureyev from the Kirov Ballet in 1961. His subsequent partnership with Fonteyn at the Royal Ballet postponed her retirement and revitalized her career. She remained the reigning queen of the Covent Garden stage for another two decades. Nerina was disappointed at being overshadowed by Fonteyn and Nureyev, but, ever generous in spirit, she never blamed Fonteyn for her dominance. She remained on friendly terms with her for many years, but her relationship with the mercurial Nureyev was ambivalent. They successfully danced together on a number of occasions, but their partnership was often testy. Alexis Rassine, David Blair, and the great Danish dancer Erik Bruhn, with whom she danced Swan Lake in 1962, were much more agreeable to her as partners.

Nerina married Charles Gordon, a financier and entrepreneur from South Africa, in 1956. During the years of his rocky career, she remained a loyal and supportive wife. They had no children. After her retirement from the stage in 1969, they moved to Monte Carlo and then to southern France, where she lived until her death. She died at her home in Beaulieu-sur-Mer, on the Mediterranean coast west of Nice. She was 80 years old.

== Legacy ==
Insights into Nerina's work and her approach to her roles can be gained from her comments and interviews in the following books.

- Clement Crisp, ed. Ballerina: Portraits and Impressions of Nadia Nerina. London: Weidenfeld & Nicolson, 1975.
- Barbara Newman, Striking a Balance: Dancers Talk about Dancing. Rev. ed. New York: Limelight, 1992.
- Cyril Swinson. Nadia Nerina. London: Adam & Charles Black, 1957.

Between 1957 and 1965, Nerina appeared in seven major television programs produced by Margaret Dale for BBC-TV. Programs currently available on commercial DVDs are the following.

- Legacy: Les Sylphides and Giselle. ICA Classics. Les Sylphides features Svetlana Beriosova, Violetta Elvin, Alicia Markova, and John Field. Giselle stars Nerina in the title role and Nikolai Fadeyechev as Albrecht. Recorded in 1958, DVD released in 2013. Catalog number: ICAD 5030.
- Legacy: Nadia Nerina, Robert Helpmann, Margot Fonteyn, Rudolf Nureyev. ICA Classics. Nerina appears in excerpts from Coppélia and Les Sylphides. Recorded in 1962, DVD released in 2012. Catalog number: 5058.
- Legacy: La Fille Mal Gardée. ICA Classics. With the original cast. Nerina as Lise, David Blair as Colas, Stanley Holden as Widow Simone, and Alexander Grant as Alain. Recorded in 1962, DVD released in 2013. Catalog number: ICAD 5088.
