= The Sailor's Return =

The Sailor's Return may refer to:

- Thomas and Sally, an operetta by Thomas Arne
- The Sailor's Return (novel), a 1925 British novel by David Garnett
- The Sailor's Return (film), a 1978 film adaptation of the novel
