= The Sailor's Return (novel) =

1925 novel by David Garnett

- Author: David Garnett
- Language: English
- Genre: Historical fiction
- Publisher: Chatto & Windus
- Publication date: 1925
- Media type: Print

The Sailor's Return is a 1925 British novel by David Garnett. In Victorian England, a Black woman "marries" a white sailor and faces hostility from the local community in Dorset.

== Ballet ==
In 1947, British choreographer Andrée Howard created The Sailor's Return for Ballet Rambert. It was her second ballet based on Garnett's work, her first being her 1939 work of the same name based on Garnett's Lady into Fox.

== Adaptation ==
In 1978 Euston Films adapted the novel into a film. The film was directed by Jack Gold and starred Tom Bell and Shope Shodeinde.
