= Ronald Crichton =

British music critic (1913–2005)

- Born: 28 December 1913; Scarborough, England, British Empire
- Died: 16 November 2005 (aged 91); Arenys de Mar, Catalonia, Spain
- Parent(s): Charles Crichton; Dorothy Maud

Ronald Crichton (28 December 1913 – 16 November 2005) was a music critic for the Financial Times in the 1960s and 1970s. He was a scion of the Earls of Erne. In his Times obituary he was described as "one of the last of the school of those cultured mandarins who were able to write and talk about all matters concerning the arts."

== Education and early career ==
He was born in Scarborough, North Yorkshire, the son of Colonel Charles William Harry Crichton, DSO (1872-1958), by his wife Dorothy Maud (who died in 1959), daughter of the Hon. Eustace Henry Dawnay, scion of the Viscounts Downe. He was educated at Radley College and Christ Church, Oxford, where he read French, but also discovered opera through the University Opera Club, then in its earliest days. He persuaded the club to mount the first British performance of Castor et Pollux by Rameau in November 1934 at Magdalen College.

After Oxford, Crichton became secretary of the Anglo-French Art and Travel Society, through which he was able to organise the visits of French theatrical companies to the United Kingdom, most notably Comédie-Française's appearance at the Savoy Theatre in 1938.

== Ballet ==
Crichton worked with the choreographer Andrée Howard on her best known ballet La fête étrange (1940), premiered by the London Ballet at the Arts Theatre, London. Although based on an episode in Alain-Fournier's novel Le Grand Meaulnes, Crichton produced a significantly adapted libretto, and also chose the six piano pieces and songs by Fauré used in the score (which were orchestrated by Guy Warrack). It was taken up by the Royal Ballet in 1958 and has subsequently received hundreds of performances.

== Critic ==
After serving in the Army in Britain and Greece during a war, Crichton joined the British Council, where he worked over the next two decades in Greece, Belgium, West Germany, and London. His freelance writing began in the early 1960s, and in 1967 he joined The Financial Times as a full-time critic, taking over from Andrew Porter as chief music critic in 1972. He retired from the FT in 1978. He also wrote for Opera magazine and The Dancing Times, edited books on the works of Manuel de Falla and Ethel Smyth, wrote the BBC Music Guide on de Falla (1992), and was a contributor to The New Grove Dictionary of Music (1979) and The New Grove Dictionary of Opera (1992).

Crichton shared the latter years of his life with his partner Juan Soriano, in Eastbourne and later in Barcelona, where Soriano came from. He died at the age of 91 in 2005 in Arenys de Mar, a town some 25 miles to the north of Barcelona. At the time he was working on a history of French opera.
