= Jardin aux lilas =

1936 ballet by Antony Tudor

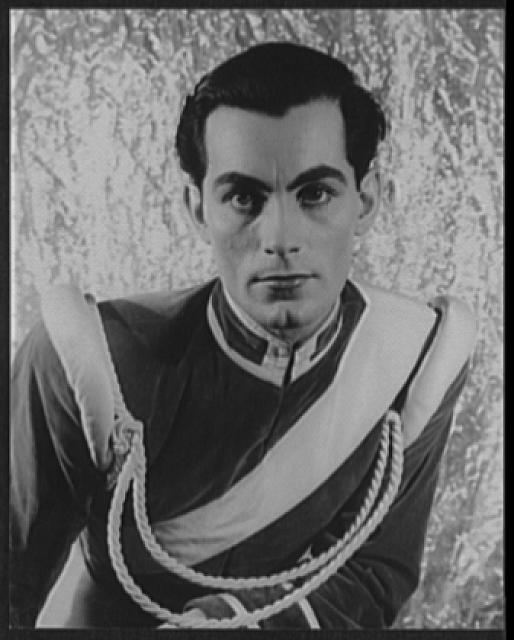
Portrait of Hugh Laing in the 1940 American premiere of Jardin aux lilas

Jardin aux lilas (Lilac Garden) is a ballet in one act choreographed by Antony Tudor to a composition by Ernest Chausson entitled Poème, Op. 25. With scenery and costumes designed by Hugo Stevenson, it was first presented by Ballet Rambert at the Mercury Theatre, London, on 26 January 1936. It is considered to be the first of the genre of psychological ballets.

== History ==
The inspiration for Chausson's Poème came from a novella by the Russian writer Ivan Turgenev, known to him in French as Le Chant de l'amour triomphant and in English as The Song of Triumphant Love, which concerns a set of intertwined relationships. Tudor tried setting his ballet to other compositions before realizing that Poème was a perfect fit for the situation he wished to portray. His ballet about unrequited love is as much about the necessity of people of the British upper classes to suppress their emotions and yield to the constraints of social convention. As a psychological study, it is a mirror of the interior monologue of its heroine, Caroline.

Jardin aux lilas is an early example of Tudor's mastery of conveying profound psychological meaning and nuance through ballet vocabulary. Among his earlier works, it is also one of his most beloved. Mounted by numerous companies around the world, including American Ballet Theatre and the Paris Opera Ballet, it continues to be performed today.

== Synopsis ==
The ballet is set at an evening garden party during the Edwardian era (1901–1910) in England. A young woman, Caroline, who is engaged to marry a man she does not love, has come to say goodbye to her friends and, particularly, Her Lover. She steals brief moments with him during the gathering, while The Man She Must Marry himself privately encounters An Episode in His Past, also present at the party. Attempts at intimacy are constantly interrupted by other guests. Caroline ultimately bids Her Lover a halted farewell as The Man She Must Marry takes her on his arm and leads her away in their betrothal of convenience. Her Lover, having secretly given Caroline a gift of lilacs at the last possible moment, is left alone as the curtain closes.

== Original cast ==
Jardin aux lilas is ideally suited to performance in a small theater, where the audience has a clear view of the subtle, emotionally wrought exchanges among the four principal characters. The original cast included Maude Lloyd as Caroline, Hugh Laing as Her Lover, Tudor himself as The Man She Must Marry, and Peggy van Praagh as An Episode in His Past. In January 1940, the American premiere was given by Ballet Theatre during its inaugural season in New York, with Tudor and Laing in their original roles, Viola Essen as Caroline, and Karen Conrad as An Episode in His Past.

== Legacy ==
Two versions of this dance were documented in Labanotation by the Dance Notation Bureau. The first was notated in 1967. The second was notated in 1981.
