= Adventure Limited =

1935 British film by George King

- Press book
- Directed by: George King
- Written by: George Dewhurst
- Based on: Trust Berkeley; 1933 play by Cyril Campion
- Starring: Harry Milton; Pearl Argyle; Sebastian Shaw
- Production company: British and Dominions
- Distributed by: Paramount British Pictures
- Release date: 1 April 1935
- Running time: 70 minutes
- Country: United Kingdom
- Language: English

Adventure Limited (also known as Adventure Ltd.) is a 1935 British comedy adventure film directed by George King and starring Harry Milton, Pearl Argyle and Sebastian Shaw. It was written by George Dewhurst based on the 1933 play George Barclay by Cyril Campion, and made at Elstree Studios as a quota quickie for release by Paramount Pictures.

== Preservation status ==
The British Film Institute National Archive holds a collection of ephemera and stills but no film or video materials.

== Plot ==
A trio of life-long adventurers, Kim Berkly, Bruce Blanford and Reginald Purdie, are about to go their separate ways, until Kim falls for Anita Lorenzo, the daughter of a deposed South American president, now in prison. Believing that international financier Sir Matthew Muller is responsible for the ex-president's jailing, Kim persuades his pals to join him on a rescue mission. Posing as a film company, they rescue the ex-president and reinstate him to his former position.

== Cast ==
- Harry Milton as Kim Berkeley
- Pearl Argyle as Anita Lorenzo
- Sebastian Shaw as Bruce Blandford
- Sam Wilkinson as Reginald Purdie
- Clifford Heatherley as Sir Matthew Muller
- Hugh E. Wright as Don Lorenzo / Montagu Phelps
- Laurence Hanray as Simon Ledbury
- Cecil Humphreys as General Baroda

== Reception ==
Kine Weekly wrote: "Comedy drama, an anaemic tale of adventure, loosely constructed and indifferently directed. The plot so surely suggests musical comedy and provides so many openings for song that the absence of melody lets the film down. The players, too, with the exception of Hugh E. Wright, master of his craft, register discomfort in their roles. The film is so simple, so naive, that it has little to recommend it outside of its quota angle. ... This musical comedy without the music is very thin stuff."

The Daily Film Renter wrote: "Feeble plot presented with complete lack of imagination, utterly fails to convince, while presentation leaves much to be desired. Action degenerates into slapstick at times. Not recommended. ... It is difficult to set down in full the details of this naive story, for it seems to defy all the accepted canons of logic. ... Directed with little imagination, the picture is a crude effort, from whatever angle it is surveyed. The players struggle hard to invest their characterisations with some degree of sincerity, but fail miserably."

Picturegoer wrote: "Musical-comedy type of adventure plot, a mixture of burlesque and the serious, which is very indifferently acted and produced. A good performance comes, however, from that sterling player, Hugh E. Wright."
