= Nigel Gosling =

British author and critic (1909–1982)

Nigel Seymour Gosling (29 January 1909– 21 May 1982) was a British art and dance critic and author.

== Career ==
Gosling attended Eton College and Cambridge University. In the 1930s, he joined the Foreign Service. A strong interest in the arts caused him to learn about painting and subsequently ballet.

Nigel Gosling spent over 30 years as part of the culture staff of The Observer, he was its art critic from 1961 to 1975. He was also features editor. With his wife Maude Lloyd he also criticised dance in the Observer. They wrote about dance from 1948 using the pseudonym Alexander Bland. He wrote many books under his own name such as Leningrad, Gustave Dore and Nadar. Under the pen name Alexander Bland, he wrote The Dancer's World, The Nureyev Image, A History of Ballet and Dance, Fonteyn and Nureyev: The Story of a Partnership and The Royal Ballet: The First 50 Years. He was the editor of his good friend Rudolf Nureyev's memoirs.

== Personal life ==
Gosling married Maude Lloyd, his ballet teacher, in 1939. They had a son, Nicolas. Gosling died in 1982, aged 73.
