= Andrée Howard =

British ballet dancer and choreographer (1910–1968)

- Born: Louise Andréa Enriqueta Howard; 3 October 1910
- Died: 18 April 1968 (aged 57); Marylebone, London, England
- Other name: Louise Barton
- Occupation: Ballet choreographer

Andrée Howard (3 October 1910 – 18 April 1968), originally Louise Andréa Enriqueta Howard, was a British ballet dancer and choreographer. She created over 30 ballets.

== Early life ==
Louise Andréa Enriqueta Howard was born on 3 October 1910. Her career as a dancer began as a pupil of Marie Rambert and she also studied in Paris where she danced in early performances of Léonide Massine's Les Présages.

== Career ==
Her ballet Death and the Maiden (choreography and costumes) for Ballet Rambert based on the music by Franz Schubert was premiered at the Duchess Theatre, London, on 23 February 1937, danced by herself as The Maiden, and John Bryon as Death. On 18 January 1940, it received its American Ballet Theatre premiere at The Center Theatre, New York, danced by Howard, and with Kurt Karnakoski as Death.

Her 1939 Lady into Fox was based on David Garnett's 1922 first novel under his own name Lady into Fox. Reviewing the 2006 reinterpretation, Judith Mackrell of The Guardian called it "a seminal Ballet Rambert work". Unfortunately, all that choreographer Mark Baldwin could find of the original choreography was a 12-minute jerky silent film. Baldwin stated: "There are all these fabulous ballets like Lady Into Fox still waiting for us to dip into. The past is such a fabulous resource."

Her best known work is La fête étrange (1940) created for the short-lived London Ballet and premiered at the Arts Theatre, London on 23 May 1940. It was based on an episode in Alain Fournier's novel Le Grand Meaulnes, with a significantly adapted libretto by Ronald Crichton, who also chose the six piano pieces and songs used in the score (orchestrated by Guy Warrack). Stage design and costumes were by Sophie Fedorovitch. The piece was so successful that it was taken up by The Royal Ballet in 1958 and has since been performed over 200 times by them and by Scottish Ballet. A 1958 film of the Royal Ballet production exists. More recent revivals have used am orchestration by Lennox Berkeley.

In 1938, she was one of the founding members of Antony Tudor's London Ballet along with Hugh Laing, Agnes de Mille, Peggy van Praagh, Maude Lloyd and Walter Gore. With the onset of World War II, in 1940 was invited with them to New York, joining Richard Pleasant's and Lucia Chase's reorganised Ballet Theater. Chase's company was later to become the American Ballet Theatre.

In 1946, Mardi gras featured Nadia Nerina's first created role, dancing alongside John Cranko, Kenneth MacMillan and Peter Darrell.

In 1947, Howard created The Sailor's Return for Ballet Rambert, based David Garnett's 1925 novel, The Sailor's Return. The story involves a West African princess marrying an English sailor and then encountering racial prejudice in England. In Dance Research, Susan Jones noted that the ballet "offers a striking critique of racism in a realist mode" and comments on "her important contribution to narrative ballet and the distinctiveness of her presentation of female experience in the period".

In 1948, the Crown Film Unit released the film, Steps of the Ballet, with choreography by Howard, music by Arthur Benjamin, directed by Muir Mathieson, decor and costumes by Hugh Stevenson, and narration by Robert Helpmann. The dancers were Gerd Larsen, Alexander Grant, Gordon Hamilton, Elaine Fifield, Michael Boulton, Michael Bayston, Jeanne Artois, Peter Wright, Moyra Fraser, Leila Russell Also in 1948, Sadler's Wells Theatre Ballet premiered Selina, choreographed to the music of Rossini by Howard, with scenario and design by Peter Williams, conducted by Guy Warrack. Elaine Fifield was the lead dancer.

A Mirror for Witches premiered on 4 March 1952, with the Sadler's Wells Ballet, at the Royal Opera House. It was based on the novel A Mirror for Witches by Esther Forbes, and consisted of a prologue and five scenes, with music by Denis ApIvor and set design by Norman Adams RA. The Spectator described Howard as "both brave and wise in her selection, because ballets of such serious import seldom enjoy a popular appeal, and because we are sick to death of those eternal period frolics which challenge neither choreographer, dancer nor spectator."

La Belle dame sans merci premiered on 4 September 1958, with the Edinburgh International Ballet, Empire Theatre, Edinburgh. The Royal Ballet premiere was on 2 September 1959. The composer was Alexander Goehr. It was based on the poem of the same title by John Keats. Howard also designed the sets and the costumes. Clive Barnes for The Spectator called it a "weak-kneed, indeterminate work".

In 1968, Howard died at her home in Marylebone, London, of a drug overdose, while suffering from depression.

She also danced on the BBC production "The Mercury Ballet".

== Ballets created ==
- Death and the Maiden (1937)
- Lady into Fox (1939)
- La fête étrange, or Assembly Ball (1940)
- Carnival of Animals (1943)
- Le Festin de l'araignée (1944)
- The Sailor's Return (1947)
- Mardi gras (1946)
- Selina (1948)
- A Mirror for Witches (1952)
- La Belle Dame sans merci (1958)
- The Mermaid
- Cinderella

== Legacy ==
The Andrée Howard Archive is held by Ballet Rambert in its Special Collections.
