= Maude Lloyd =

South African ballet dancer

Maude Lloyd (16 August 1908 – 26 November 2004) was a South African ballet dancer and teacher who immigrated to England and became an important figure in early British ballet as a founding member of Ballet Rambert. She had a significant second career as a dance critic, writing with her husband under the nom de plume Alexander Bland.

== Early life and training ==
Maude Lloyd was born in Cape Town where she studied ballet with Helen Webb. Webb, who had arrived from England in 1912, opened her own school of "fancy dancing" (i.e., classical ballet), and then introduced dance into the curriculum of the South African College of Music. Having been a pupil of Enrico Cecchetti in London, Webb employed the Cecchetti method of instructing her students in Cape Town. After some years of training with Webb and performing in recitals staged at the town hall, Lloyd went to London on a scholarship from Webb, armed with an introduction to Marie Rambert, an old friend of Webb's and a well-known teacher of ballet at her school in Notting Hill. Lloyd arrived in England sometime in 1924 or 1925, when she was 16 or 17, and promptly enrolled in Rambert's school. After a period of concentrated study there, she returned to South Africa in 1927 and taught at Webb's school for three years before returning to England.

== Dancing career ==
On returning to England in 1930, Lloyd was among Rambert's students who became founding members of her Ballet Club, the performing group from which Ballet Rambert was to evolve. She danced with this group at several West End theaters and on tours outside London, as well as appearing in repertory works with the Camargo Society. From 1930 onward, she was a leading dancer in the regular Sunday performances of Rambert's Ballet Club at the Mercury Theatre in Notting Hill Gate. Other members of the club included emerging choreographers Frederick Ashton, Antony Tudor, and Andrée Howard, each of whom would respond to Lloyd's technical ability, as well as her intelligence, elegance, and sensitivity, by creating roles for her in their works. With occasional brief absences—to dance with other British companies and to visit South Africa once more, in 1932—Lloyd remained with Ballet Rambert until 1940. She followed Pearl Argyle and Alicia Markova, the company's first ballerinas, in many of their created roles but soon had new roles of her own.

When Lloyd met Antony Tudor in one of Rambert's classes in 1930, she was immediately drawn to him, and he to her. She, along with Hugh Laing, became one of his muses, inspiring him to create numerous works with roles focusing on her special qualities. "Not only was she very pretty, with beautifully curved feet, but she also danced with a rich, natural expressiveness that fed the psychological realism with which Tudor was experimenting." Of the numerous Tudor works in which she danced leading roles, none has been more enduring than Jardin aux Lilas (Lilac Garden), premiered in 1936. Lloyd's portrayal of Caroline, who gives up Her Lover (Laing) for The Man She Must Marry (Tudor), was "a beautifully modulated exposition of the simmering passions and dutiful restraint characteristic of Edwardian life." This was followed in 1937 by another Tudor masterpiece, Dark Elegies, set to Mahler's song cycle Kindertotenlieder (Songs on the Death of Children), in which she and Tudor danced a tender, sorrowful pas de deux to the second song. She also made successful appearances in the classical repertory, dancing Aurora in Rambert's version of Aurora's Wedding, the Prelude in Les Sylphides, and Odette in a one-act version of Swan Lake. Having danced decorous roles in Ashton's The Lady of Shalott and Howard's Cinderella, she appeared in a more boisterous role as the can-can dancer La Goulue in Bar aux Folies-Bergères by Ninette de Valois. One reviewer of the roles in Lloyd's repertory described her as having "a noble serenity and a deep expressiveness allied to sparkling gifts of comedy."

In 1938, Tudor had a spat with Rambert and left her company to form his own troupe, which he dubbed the London Ballet. Lloyd was one of the Rambert dancers who became founding members of this newly formed company. For it, she created two more memorable roles. As the Italian ballerina in Tudor's Gala Performance, she displayed both elegance and wit in competing for the limelight with her French and Russian rivals, and in Howard's La Fête Étrange, a haunting, dreamlike tale, she was mysteriously beautiful as the bride-to-be who captures the fancy of an adolescent boy. (The Boy was played by the young Frank Staff, a fellow South African and former student of Lloyd's in Cape Town.) After the outbreak of war with Germany in September 1939, and Tudor's departure for greener, and safer, pastures in America, Lloyd and Peggy van Praagh directed and danced in the company until the blitz caused nearly all the London theaters to close. When the London Ballet folded and was absorbed back into Ballet Rambert in 1940, Lloyd retired from the stage.

== Roles created ==
Lloyd created important roles in the ballets of Antony Tudor and other choreographers working in London in the 1930s. Among them are the following.

=== In Tudor ballets ===
- 1931. Cross-Garter'd, music by Girolamo Frescoobaldi. Role: Olivia, dancing a comic pas de deux with Tudor as Malvolio.
- 1932. Mr. Roll's Quadrilles, set to old English music. Role: a pas de trois with Elizabeth Schooling and Betty Cuff.
- 1934. The Planets, music by Gustav Holst. Role: Venus.
- 1935. The Descent of Hebe, music by Ernest Bloch. Role: Night.
- 1936. Jardin aux Lilas, music by Ernest Chausson. Role: Caroline.
- 1937. Dark Elegies, music by Gustav Mahler. Role: bereaved mother, in a pas de deux with Tudor.
- 1937. Pasquinade, the first television revue broadcast on the BBC. Role: solo dancer.
- 1937. Fugue for Four Cameras, an experimental work for television, music by Johan Sebastian Bach. Role: solo dancer.
- 1938. Soirée Musicale, music by Gioacchino Rossini, arranged by Benjamin Britten. Role: Tirolese, a pas de deux with Tudor.
- 1938. Gala Performance, music by Sergei Prokofiev. Role: La Déesse de la Danse (from Milan).

=== In other works ===
- 1927. The Fairy Queen, opera by Henry Purcell, choreography by Frederick Ashton and Marie Rambert. Roles: Echo Dance, Three Swans, Dance of the Haymakers, and Chaconne.
- 1931, La Péri, choreography by Frederick Ashton, music by Paul Dukas. Role: Companion.
- 1931. Façade, choreography by Frederick Ashton, music by William Walton. Roles: Scotch Rhapsody and Valse.
- 1931. The Lady of Shalott, choreography by Frederick Ashton, music by Jean Sibelius. Role: The Reflection.
- 1931. Le Boxing, choreography by Susan Salaman, music by Lord Berners. Role: Sport Girl.
- 1935. Valentine's Eve, choreography by Frederick Ashton, music by Maurice Ravel. Role: Solange.
- 1940. La Fête Étrange, choreography by Andrée Howard, music by Gabriel Fauré. Role: The Young Chatelaine.

She also danced on the BBC production "The Mercury Ballet".

== Later life ==
In the summer of 1939, Lloyd married Nigel Gosling, an art and dance critic, and settled into retirement to wait out the war years, concentrating on doing welfare work. She began a second career when Richard Buckle persuaded her to start writing reviews of dance performances for his magazine Ballet, working in tandem with her husband. Finding the arrangement congenial, they called themselves Alexander Bland, a pseudonym derived from the names of two characters in the tales of Beatrix Potter: Pigling Bland, who is described as "hopelessly volatile" and his brother Alexander. In 1955, when Buckle left his post as dance critic for The Observer, a weekly newspaper published on Sunday, the Goslings took over, staying on until Nigel's death in 1982. During almost two decades of working together, they not only regularly wrote reviews for the newspaper, but they wrote, edited, or contributed to ten books on ballet and dance, four of which dealt with the life and career of Rudolf Nureyev.

The Goslings had first seen Nureyev dance with the Kirov Ballet in Paris, just before he defected to the West in June 1961. Soon after, when Margot Fonteyn persuaded the young Russian virtuoso to come to London to appear in a gala for the Royal Academy of Dance, she asked the Goslings to befriend him. Taking to this with a will, they came to regard him with particular admiration. In their glowing review of his first Covent Garden performance, they suggested the rejuvenating effect he might have on British ballet, describing him as "a balletic missile, a wild animal loose in the drawing room." They offered him free run of their Kensington home and helped him to adjust to life in a new country. In time, the friendship deepened, as there was genuine respect and liking on both sides. After the Goslings' son Nicholas married and moved away, Nureyev became the son of their late middle age. They became, in effect, his surrogate parents, offering him guidance, affection, and hospitality until the end of his and their lives.

Maude Lloyd had enjoyed an ideal marriage with Nigel Gosling, so his death was a devastating loss to her, as it was to Nureyev, who had admired Gosling's intelligence, culture, and quiet dignity. Lloyd survived her husband for another twenty years, sustained by the care and attention of Nureyev and others. From her salad days into old age, she was much loved and admired by all who knew her. Elegant and agile, even at 95, she lived out her days in simplicity and with a remarkable mental generosity, despite the failure of both sight and hearing. She died peacefully at her home in Kensington in the presence of family and friends.

== Bibliography ==
Among the published works of Alexander Bland are the following:

- 1963. The Dancer's World. By Michael Peto and Alexander Bland. With drawings by Josef Herman. New York: Reynal.
- 1963. Nureyev: An Autobiography with Pictures. By Rudolf Nureyev, edited by Alexander Bland (i.e., ghostwritten by Nigel Gosling). With photographs by Richard Avedon. London: Dutton. Reissued as Nureyev: His Spectacular Early Years: An Autobiography (London: Hodder & Stoughton, 1993).
- 1968. Internationales Ballett auf Deutschen Bühnen. Photographs by Hannes Kilian, text by Alexander Bland and others. Munich: Prestel-Verlag.
- 1976. The Nureyev Image. London: Studio Vista. New York: Quadrangle.
- 1976. A History of Ballet and Dance in the Western World. London: Barrie & Jenkins. New York: Praeger.
- 1977. The Nureyev Valentino: Portrait of a Film. London: Studio Vista. New York: Dell.
- 1979. Fonteyn and Nureyev: The Story of a Partnership. London: Orbis. New York: Times Books.
- 1981. The Royal Ballet: The First Fifty Years. With a foreword by Dame Ninette de Valois. London: Threshold Books. New York: Doubleday.
- 1984. Men Dancing: Performers and Performances. By Alexander Bland and John Percival. New York: Macmillan.
- 1985. Observer of the Dance, 1955-1982. London: Dance Books.
