= Lady into Fox =

1922 book by David Garnett

- Dust-jacket from the first edition
- Author: David Garnett
- Language: English
- Genre: Fantasy novel
- Publisher: Chatto and Windus
- Publication date: 1922
- Publication place: United Kingdom
- Media type: Print (Hardback)
- Pages: 91 pp

Lady into Fox was David Garnett's first novel using his own name, published in 1922. It won the James Tait Black Memorial Prize, and the Hawthornden Prize a year later.

== Plot summary ==
Silvia Tebrick, the 24-year-old wife of Richard Tebrick, suddenly becomes a fox while they are out walking in the woods. Mr. Tebrick sends away all the servants in an attempt to keep Silvia's new nature a secret, although Silvia's childhood nurse returns. While Silvia initially acts human, insisting on wearing clothing and playing piquet, her behaviour increasingly becomes that characteristic of a vixen, causing the husband a great deal of anguish. Eventually, Mr. Tebrick releases Silvia into the wild, where she gives birth to five kits, whom Tebrick names and plays with every day. Despite Tebrick's efforts to protect Silvia and her cubs, she is ultimately killed by dogs during a fox hunt; Tebrick, who tried to save Silvia from the dogs, is badly wounded, but eventually recovers.

McSweeney's Collins Library imprint republished Lady into Fox in 2004.

== Reception and influence ==
Rebecca West described Lady Into Fox as one of the "best imaginative productions" of the decade.

The success of the novel resulted in several imitations. They included a parody by Christopher Ward (1868–1943) Gentleman Into Goose (1924), while Vercors' homage Sylva (1961), depicts a fox transforming into a woman.

== Adaptation ==
In 1939, British choreographer Andrée Howard created a musical work of the same name based on Garnett's book for Ballet Rambert. Sally Gilmour dancing Silvia Tebrick assured the ballet's success. The music was an arrangement of piano pieces by Arthur Honegger (Sept pièces brèves and Toccata et variations), setting and costumes designed by Nadia Benois.
