= Pearl Argyle =

South African ballerina and actress (1910–1947)

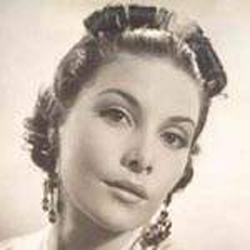
- Argyle in the 1930s
- Born: Pearl Wellman; 7 November 1910; Johannesburg, South Africa
- Died: 29 January 1947 (aged 36); New York City, U.S.
- Occupations: Ballet dancer and actress
- Parent(s): Ernest James Wellman and Mary Wellman.

Pearl Argyle (born Pearl Wellman; 7 November 1910 – 29 January 1947) was a South African ballet dancer and actress. She appeared in leading roles with English ballet companies in the 1930s and later performed in stage musicals and in films.

== Early life and training ==
Argyle was born in Johannesburg, the daughter of Ernest James Wellman and Mary Wellman.

She first enters dance history in the mid-1920s, when she appeared in London and enrolled in ballet classes at the schools of Nikolai Legat, in Colet Gardens, and Dame Marie Rambert, in Notting Hill Gate. There she was known as Pearl Argyle by other students and members of Rambert's Ballet Club, the performing group from which Ballet Rambert was to evolve. Among other club members at the time was the emerging choreographer Sir Frederick Ashton, who would play a significant role in her career on the ballet stage.

== Ballet ==
At the time that Argyle studied at the Rambert Ballet School, Ashton was the principal dancer of its performing group as well as a budding choreographer. He recalled that she was a shy young woman, subject to blushing when addressed, but was a charming person and a graceful dancer. Like most people, he was immediately struck by her good looks. He likened her to movie actress Greta Garbo and called her "the most beautiful woman of her generation." She soon became his muse, inspiring him to create roles for her in a number of his early ballets.

Argyle was an important member of Rambert's group of student performers in the late 1920s and of the subsequent Ballet Club and the Camargo Society, from 1930 to 1935. Subsequently, she was a principal dancer with the Vic-Wells Ballet from 1936 to 1938. Among the leading roles she danced during these years were the following.

- 1927. The Fairy-Queen, opera by Henry Purcell, with dances by Marie Rambert and Frederick Ashton. Roles: Dance of the Followers of Night, an attendant on Summer, and Chaconne.
- 1928. Nymphs and Shepherds, choreography by Frederick Ashton, music by Wolfgang Amadeus Mozart (from Les Petits Riens). Roles: Passepied, with William Chappell; Gavotte Joyeuse, with Andrée Howard and Harold Turner; and Courante, with Andrée Howard, Harold Turner, and William Chappell.
- 1928. Leda, choreography by Frederick Ashton and Marie Rambert, music by Christoph Willibald Gluck (ballet music from Orfeo ed Euridice). Role: a Naiade. Later revised as Leda and the Swan, with choreography by Ashton alone. Role: a Nymph.
- 1929. The Ballet of Mars and Venus, choreography by Marie Rambert, music by Domenico Scarlatti, orchestrated by Constant Lambert. Role: Venus.
- 1930. Capriol Suite, choreography by Frederick Ashton, music by Peter Warlock, on themes from Thoinot Arbeau's Orchesographie. Roles: Basse Danse and Pieds en l'Air, both with other members of the ensemble.
- 1930. A Florentine Picture, choreography by Frederick Ashton, music by Arcangelo Corelli. Role: an Angel.
- 1931. La Péri, choreography by Frederick Ashton, music by Paul Dukas. Role: a Companion.
- 1931. Façade, choreography by Frederick Ashton, music by William Walton. Role: Valse, with Diana Gould, Maude Lloyd, and Prudence Hyman. In a 1935 production for the Vic-Wells Ballet, Argyle created the role of The Maiden in Country Dance, with Richard Ellis as A Yokel and Robert Helpmann as The Squire.
- 1931. The Lady of Shallot, ballet by Frederick Ashton, after the poem by Alfred, Lord Tennyson, music by Jean Sibelius. Role: The Lady of Shallot.
- 1931. The Lord of Burleigh, choreography by Frederick Ashton, music by Felix Mendelssohn-Bartholdy. Role: Adeline. In a 1937 production for the Vic-Wells Ballet, Argyle danced the leading role of Lady Clara Vere de Vere.
- 1932. A brief appearance in Ballyhoo in The Haymarket Theatre, London before she joined the Ballet Rambert.
- 1932, An 1805 Impression, a ballet by Frederick Ashton, music by Franz Schubert. Role: Récamier. In a 1933 revival under the title Récamier, Argyle again danced the title role of Madame Recamier.
- 1933. Les Masques, ou Changement de Dames, a ballet by Frederick Ashton, music by Francis Poulenc. Role: Wife of A Personage, played by Frederick Ashton.
- 1934. Bar aux Folies-Bergère, choreography by Ninette de Valois, music by Emmanuel Chabrier, arranged by Constant Lambert. Role: La Fille au Bar.
- 1934. The Mermaid, choreography by Andrée Howard, music by Maurice Ravel. Role: The Little Mermaid.
- 1935. Valentine's Eve, choreography by Frederick Ashton, music by Maurice Ravel. Role: Phryné.
- 1935. Le Basier de la Fée, choreography by Frederick Ashton, music by Igor Stravinsky. Role: The Fairy.
- 1936. The Gods Go a-Begging, choreography by Ninette de Valois, music by George Friedrich Handel. Role: The Serving Maid, opposite William Chappell as The Shepherd.
- 1938. Le Roi Nu, choreography by Ninette de Valois, music by Jean Françaix. Role: The Empress.

Argyle had left London in 1933 to go to Paris, where she danced with George Balanchine's short-lived company Les Ballets 1933, led by Tamara Toumanova and Tilly Losch. Back in London in 1934, she rejoined the Ballet Club and created the role of the barmaid in Ninette de Valois's Bar aux Folies-Bergère, inspired by the famous painting by Édouard Manet. (This role was later taken by Elisabeth Schooling, who bore a remarkable resemblance to the girl in Manet's painting.) As the Fille du Bar, Argyle shared the stage with Alicia Markova as the can-can dancer La Goulue and Frederick Ashton as her partner Valentin le désossé. Argyle also created the title role in Andrée Howard's The Mermaid, based on Hans Christian Andersen's story "The Little Mermaid," which was her last new role for the Ballet Club. She also appeared in other ballets in the company's repertory, notably Les Sylphides and The Sleeping Beauty. In the latter, she is said to have been the first British ballerina to perform Marius Petipa's choreography for the grand pas de deux' in act 3.

In 1935, Argyle left Rambert's company to join the Vic-Wells Ballet as a principal dancer.) In this troupe, organized by Lillian Baylis and de Valois to perform at both the Old Vic Theatre and the Sadler's Wells Theatre, she created two more important roles. Ashton's version of Le Baiser de la Fée (The Fairy's Kiss) was also based on a tale by Hans Christian Andersen, "The Ice Maiden." In the title role of The Fairy, it was said that Argyle's "cold classicism was magically used by Ashton." Soon after, she danced in another de Valois ballet inspired by a painting, a fête gallante of Antoine Watteau, the eighteenth-century French master of bucolic and idyllic scenes. In The Gods Go a-Begging (1936), Argyle created the important role of the Serving Maid. She then left the Vic-Wells company but returned in 1938 to create a role in yet another ballet inspired by a story by Hans Christian Andersen, "The Emperor's New Clothes." Dancing the role of the Empress in de Valois's Le Roi Nu, she once again won applause from delighted audiences.

== Stage and screen ==
In 1932, Argyle appeared in Ballyhoo, a revue at London's Comedy Theatre starring Hermione Baddeley and George Sanders, with dances and ensembles by Buddy Bradley and ballets by Frederick Ashton. She danced in four numbers: (1) By Candlelight, with Walter Crisham, John Byron, and The Girls; (2) Mediterranean Madness, with Walter Gore as The Matelot; (3) Far beyond the Crowd, with Walter Crisham and others; and (4) Ballet for Four Pianos and Orchestra, with Walter Gore, John Byron, and The Girls.

Little else is known of her appearances in musical theater. In 1938, she married filmmaker Curtis Bernhardt and moved to the United States, eventually settling in California. There, she appeared in Charlot's Revuette, staged by André Charlot at El Capitan Theater in Hollywood and starring Rita Hayworth.

Argyle appeared in at least five films:

- 1932) That Night in London, also known as Over Night. London Film Productions. Filmed in Elstree. Hertfordshire, England. In this crime drama, Argyle had a starring role, opposite Robert Donat, making his film debut.
- 1934) Chu Chin Chow, also known as Ali Baba Nights. Gainsborough Pictures. Filmed at Islington, London, England. In this musical retelling of "Ali Baba and the Forty Thieves," Argyle appears as Marjanah, a servant girl, with George Robey as Ali Baba, Fritz Kortner as Abu Hasan, and Anna May Wong as Zahrat.
- 1935) Adventure Ltd. British & Dominions Film Corporation. Filmed at Elstree, Hertfordshire, England. In a screenplay written by British playwright Cyril Campion, Argyle costarred with Harry Milton and Sebastian Shaw.
- 1935) Royal Cavalcade, also known as Regal Cavalcade. British International Pictures. Filmed at Borehamwood, Hertfordshire, England. To commemorate the silver jubilee of King George V, this film, modeled along the lines of a March of Time documentary, recreates highlights of the previous twenty-five years. Argyle appears as Anna Pavlova.
- 1936) Things to Come. London Film Productions. Filmed at Denham, Buckinghamshire, England. The screenplay for this science-fiction movie was written by H.G. Wells, based on his novel The Shape of Things to Come. It was produced by Alexander Korda and directed by William Cameron Menzies. Argyle stars alongside Raymond Massey, Ralph Richardson, Margaretta Scott, and Cedric Hardwicke.
- 1938) Three Artists. British Broadcasting Corporation (BBC West). Filmed at Alexandra Palace, Alexandra Palace Way, Muswell Hill, London, England. Argyle appears as herself, one of the three artists interviewed.
- 1940) Night in December, also known as Dezembernacht and Night in December. Film Metzger et Woog. Filmed in Paris. This romantic movie about a piano virtuoso (Pierre Blanchar) who falls in love with a mysterious young woman (Renée Saint-Cyr) features Argyle in the role of "Betty, la jeune ballerine."

== Later life ==
In 1936, Argyle married German film director Curtis Bernhardt (1899-1981), also known as Kurt, and their son Steven was born in February 1937. The family eventually settling in Los Angeles.

In 1947, aged 36, Argyle died of a sudden cerebral hemorrhage while visiting her husband in New York.
