= Lucia Chase =

American actress (1897–1986)

- Born: Lucia Hosmer Chase; March 24, 1897; Waterbury, Connecticut, United States
- Died: January 9, 1986 (aged 88); New York City, New York, U.S.
- Awards: Presidential Medal of Freedom

Lucia Hosmer Chase (March 24, 1897 – January 9, 1986) was an American dancer, actress, ballet director and also the co-founder of the American Ballet Theatre.

== Life and career ==
Chase was born in Waterbury, Connecticut, the daughter of Elizabeth Hosmer (Kellogg) and Irving Hall Chase. She attended St. Margaret's School and later Bryn Mawr College.

After deciding to focus on theater, she studied drama at New York's Theater Guild School where she also took ballet lessons. Though her first love was the theatre, after she decided that dance was to be her life, she studied seriously with, among others, Mikhail Mordkin, Michel Fokine, Antony Tudor, and Bronislava Nijinska. She performed with the Mordkin Ballet from 1937 to 1939, where she danced the title roles in The Sleeping Beauty and Giselle.

In 1940, she and Richard Pleasant founded Ballet Theatre (later American Ballet Theatre), with Lucia Chase as principal dancer (and prime financial backer), although she concentrated on the more dramatic and comedic roles.

She created the Eldest Sister in Tudor's Pillar of Fire (1942) and the Greedy One in Agnes de Mille's Three Virgins and a Devil (1941). In 1945 she and Oliver Smith jointly took over direction of American Ballet Theatre.

She retired from the stage in 1960, and retired as company director in 1980, when she was succeeded by Mikhail Baryshnikov.

She devoted her energy and a large part of her personal fortune over four decades to ensure the company's survival. She brought Tudor and Baryshnikov to American Ballet Theatre and encouraged US choreographers such as Jerome Robbins, Glen Tetley and Twyla Tharp. She was awarded the US Presidential Medal of Freedom in 1980.

Chase was married to Thomas Ewing, with whom she had two sons. She died in New York City.

Chase was inducted into the National Museum of Dance's Mr. & Mrs. Cornelius Vanderbilt Whitney Hall of Fame in 1988.

In 2009, the book, Bravura!: Lucia Chase and the American Ballet Theatre, written by her son Alex C. Ewing, was released.

== Filmography ==
Year	Film	Role	Notes
1976	Live from Lincoln Center (Swan Lake)	Queen Mother	1 episode
1957	Omnibus (Lizzie Borden)	Stepmother	1 episode
1973	American Ballet Theatre: A Close-Up in Time	Herself	
