= Hugh Laing =

Barbadian ballet dancer

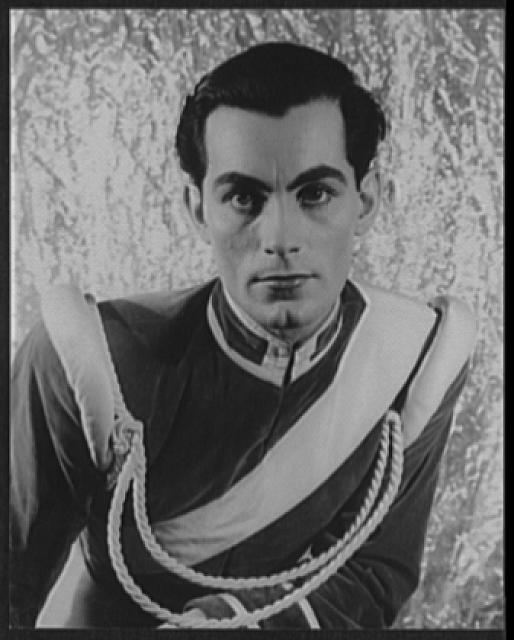
- Hugh Laing, in Jardin aux lilas Photo by Carl Van Vechten, 1940
- Born: 6 June 1911; La Vega, Barbados, British West Indies
- Died: 10 May 1988 (aged 76); New York City, US
- Occupation: Ballet dancer
- Years active: 1933–1987
- Spouse: Diana Adams (m. 1947; div. 1953)
- Partner: Antony Tudor

Hugh Laing (born Hugh Morris Alleyne Skinner, 6 June 1911 – 10 May 1988) was a ballet dancer. Known for his good looks and the intensity of his stage presence, Laing danced with Marie Rambert's Ballet Club and New York City Ballet. Laing is regarded as one of the finest dramatic dancers of 20th-century ballet.

== Biography ==
=== Early life and education ===
Hugh Laing was born in Barbados in the then British West Indies on June 6, 1911. He was of English and Irish background, the son of Donald M. and Beatrice A. Skinner. He moved to London in 1931 to study art, but soon became interested in ballet.

=== Ballet career ===
After taking ballet classes with Marie Rambert, Margaret Craske and Olga Preobrajenska, he joined Rambert's experimental Ballet Club in 1933, and it was there that he met Antony Tudor. They became collaborators and lovers.

Laing was never considered a great technician, yet his powers of characterisation and his sense of theatrical timing were considered remarkable. His profile as a significant dancer of his era was almost certainly enhanced by Tudor's choreographing to his undoubted strengths

For the Ballet Club, Tudor created roles for Laing in The Planets, The Descent of Hebe, Jardin aux Lilas and Dark Elegies.

In 1938, Laing became a member of Tudor's London Ballet, a short-lived troupe for which he danced in Tudor's Gala Performance and Judgment of Paris.

Hugh Laing accompanied Tudor to New York in 1939 to participate in the first season of Ballet Theater, as American Ballet Theatre was originally known. Just as Tudor soon was recognised as a great choreographer, so Laing was hailed as one of the company's finest artists.

At Ballet Theater, Tudor choreographed several of the roles for which Laing was famous - the handsome, but corrupt, Young Man from the House Opposite in Pillar of Fire (1942), Romeo in Romeo and Juliet (1943), a sophisticated gentleman in Dim Lustre (also 1943) and a murderer in Undertow (1945). He was also admired for his portrayals of the gypsy lover in Léonide Massine's Aleko, a neurotic young man in Jerome Robbins' Facsimile, Albrecht in Giselle and the title role of Petrushka.

Laing was married to American ballerina Diana Adams from 1947 to 1953. The couple often danced together and premiered Tudor's new work "The Dear Departed" at the Jacob's Pillow Dance Festival in 1949.

Laing danced with the New York City Ballet from 1950 to 1952, appearing in a revival of Jardin aux Lilas and in such new works by Tudor such as The Lady of the Camellias (1951) with Adams and La Gloire (1952).

In addition, he won praise in the title role of George Balanchine's Prodigal Son and Robbins's Age of Anxiety. He later made guest appearances with Ballet Theater, then embarked upon a new career as a commercial photographer in New York continuing to assist Tudor with restagings of his ballets.

Laing appeared as the villain Harry Beaton in the film version of the musical Brigadoon (1954).

He also danced on the BBC production "The Mercury Ballet".

=== Death ===
Laing died of cancer, aged 76, at St. Luke's Hospital in New York City in 1988.

== Filmography ==
Year	Title	Role	Notes
1939	A Divertissement	Dancer	Short
1954	Brigadoon	Harry Beaton	(final film role)
