= Peggy van Praagh =

British ballerina and dance educator (1910–1990)

Dame Peggy van Praagh DBE
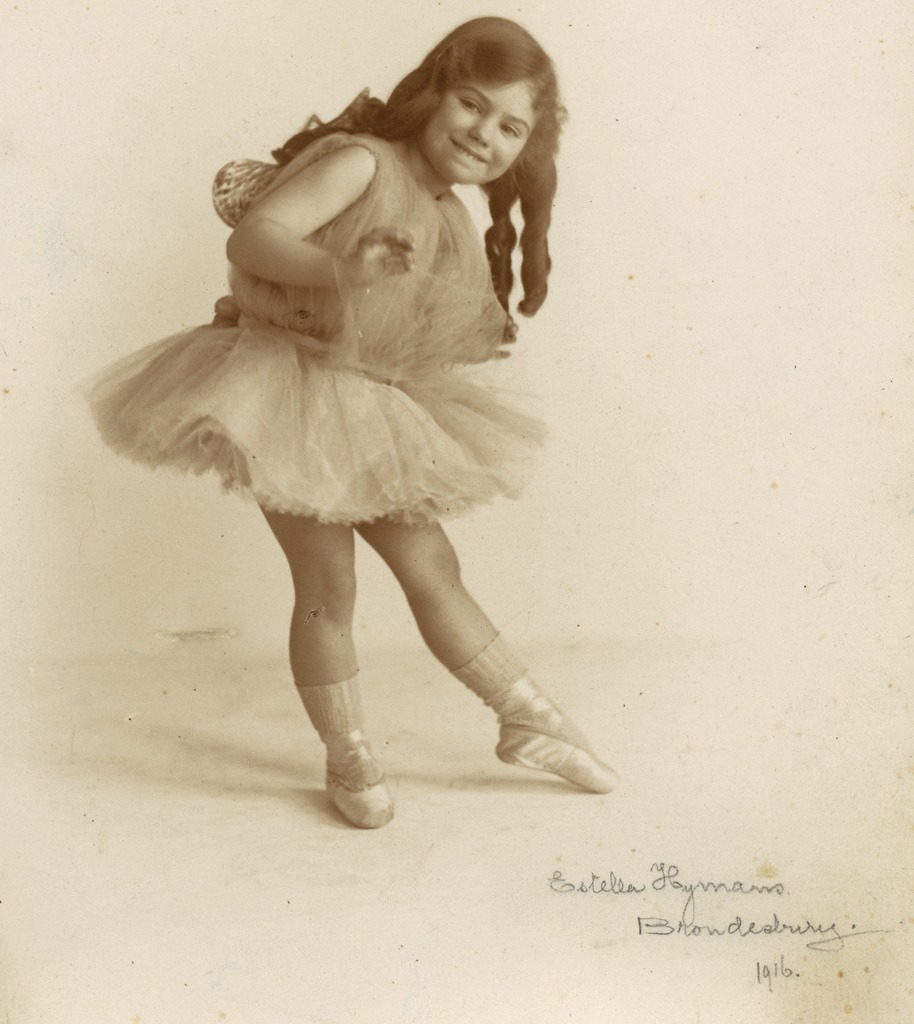
- Peggy van Praagh in "Honey bee dance", 1916 - Estella Hymans
- Born: Margaret van Praagh; 1 September 1910; London, England
- Died: 15 January 1990 (aged 79); Melbourne, Australia
- Occupations: ballerina; choreographer; teacher; repetiteur; producer; director; advocate

Dame Margaret Van Praagh DBE (1 September 1910 – 15 January 1990) was a British ballet dancer, choreographer, teacher, repetiteur, producer, advocate and director, who spent much of her later career in Australia.

== Early life ==
Peggy Van Praagh was born in London and was of Dutch, Scottish and English descent. Her father, Harold John Van Praagh, was a British physician with a Jewish background and her mother was Ethel Louise née Shanks. Her paternal grandfather was William van Praagh. She was educated at King Alfred School, London where she meet A.S. Neill who heavily influenced her passion for dance through artistic thinking and creativity which aided her in the dance community. Throughout the course her schooling, she was involved in a series of plays and productions.

== Dancing ==
She began dancing very early in London at the age of 4. One review stated: "At last night's concert a dainty extra was a very charming dance by little Peggy Van Praagh ... Peggy is only six but she is quite a clever little artiste and is booked again for Saturday's matinee by request."

Late in 1929, Van Praagh was offered a two-week position at a small company formed by (Sir) Anton Dolin. Despite the brief engagement, it allowed her to become a student of Margaret Craske where she studied mime with Tamara Karsavina, repertoire with Lydia Sokolova, modern expressionist dance with Gertrud Bodenwieser and ballet history with Cyril W. Beaumont.

Van Praagh joined Ballet Rambert in 1933. Later she also danced with Antony Tudor's London Ballet. Van Praagh performed in some of Tudor's ballets such as Jardin aux Lilas (otherwise Lilac Garden), Dark Elegies, Gala Performance, Soirée musicale and The Planets.

In the early years of World War II, she was heavily involved in staging lunch time ballet shows called Ballet for a Bob, which attracted large audiences of civilian and military personnel. In 1941, she was employed by Ninette de Valois largely to teach company classes for Sadler's Wells Ballet, although van Praagh also danced in a number of company productions including Les Patineurs, Comus and Coppelia in which she danced the leading role of Swanilda.

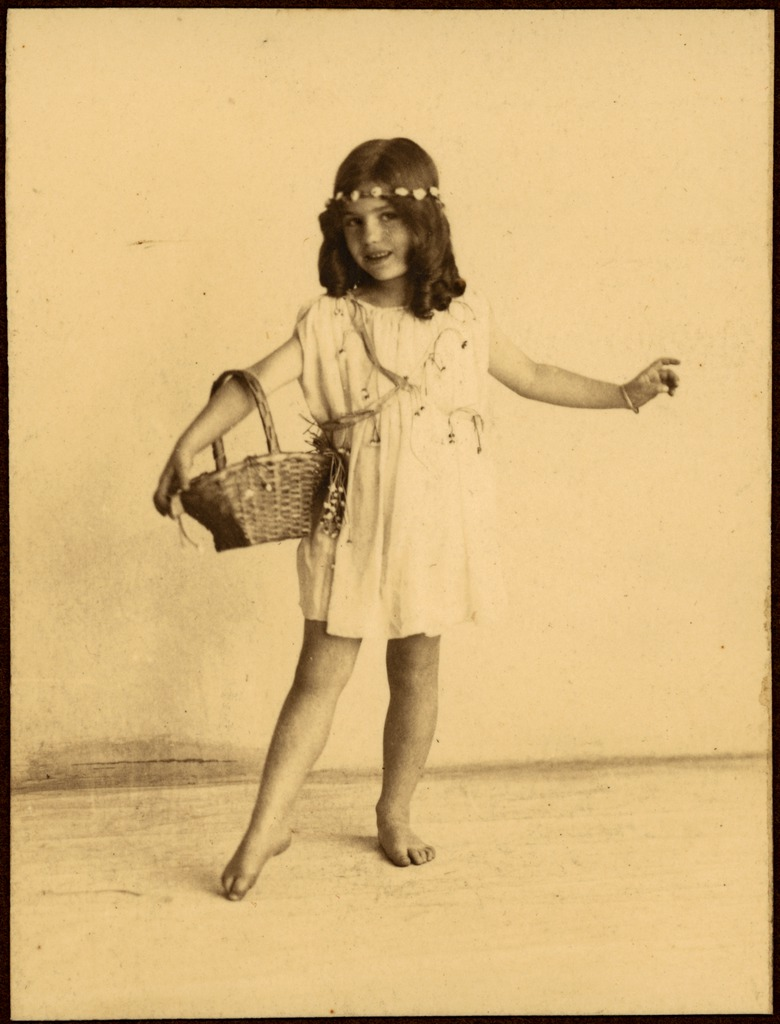

== Choreographer and teacher ==
In 1945, van Praagh became a teacher at the Sadler's Wells Ballet School. She worked there until 1956. During this time she maintained a long, fruitful association with choreographer Antony Tudor. From 1956 until 1960 she undertook freelance teaching and producing in Germany, Canada, Denmark, Sweden, the Netherlands and the US.

== Artistic Director of the Borovansky and Australian Ballet ==
In 1959, on the recommendation of Ninette de Valois, van Praagh was appointed Artistic Director of the Borovansky Ballet in 1960. Following the demise of the Borovansky Ballet in 1961 and its subsequent reformation as Australian Ballet, she became its founding artistic director in 1962, where she remained until 1974, and was invited back again for the 1978 season. From 1965–1974, van Praagh held the position jointly with Sir Robert Helpmann.

Under van Praagh's direction, the Australian Ballet made the first of many overseas tours, developed a repertoire of ballets that included works from the established international repertoire as well as commissioned works from Australian and overseas choreographers, and hosted guest appearances by a number of notable dancers including Sonia Arova, Erik Bruhn, Dame Margot Fonteyn and Rudolf Nureyev. While with the Australian Ballet, she also nurtured the development of Australian choreographers including Graeme Murphy, Ian Spink, John Meehan and Leigh Warren.

Marilyn Rowe, a protégé of van Praagh, and later Director of the Australian Ballet School said of her mentor: "Peggy had a five point plan for the development of the Australian Ballet:"

1. A company of dancers engaged on annual contracts. Such contracts were heretofore unknown,
2. A repertoire of established classics together with the best works by contemporary choreographers, designers and composers
3. To present, as guest artists, the world's best dancers and teachers
4. To tour the company internationally
5. To establish a national ballet school"

== Dance advocate ==
Van Praagh was an advocate for dance education. During her career in Australia, along with Bernard James of the University of New England's continuing education program, she was instrumental in organising a series of summer schools in dance that had a long-lasting influence on dance in Australia. She also helped establish the advocacy body, Ausdance (formerly Australian Association for Dance Education). In 1982, van Praagh was coordinator of dance studies at the Western Australian Academy of Performing Arts, Edith Cowan University, Perth.

On 15 January 1990, she died in Melbourne.

== Oral History ==
Van Praagh was interviewed in 1973 by Hazel de Berg about the beginnings of the Australian ballet, changing preconceptions of dancers, modern dance and ballet, among other things. This recording can be found at the National Library of Australia.

== Legacy ==
- She was inducted into the Hall of Fame at the 2000 Australian Dance Awards.
- She was inducted into the Victorian Honour Roll of Women in 2001.

== Affiliations/Honours ==
- Fellow of the Imperial Society of Teachers of Dancing (London), 1933
- Queen Elizabeth Coronation Prize from the Royal Academy of Dance, 1965
- Officer of the Order of the British Empire (OBE, 1966)
- Member of the Royal Academy of Dancing, 1969
- Dame Commander of the Order of the British Empire (DBE, 14 June 1970)
- Britannica Australia Award for Arts, 1970
- Honorary life patron of the National Capital Ballet School, Canberra, 1971
- Hon. D. Litt (University of New England), 1974
- Special Artist's Award, Australia Council, 1975
- Honorary life member of the Australian Ballet Foundation, 1979.
- Inducted into the Victorian Honour Roll of Women in 2011

== Books ==
- Sexton, Christopher, "Peggy van Praagh – A life of dance", Macmillan, South Melbourne, 1985
- Van Praagh, Margaret (Peggy), How I became a ballet dancer, Nelson, London, 1954
- Van Praagh, Ballet in Australia, Longmans, Melbourne, 1965
- Van Praagh, The arts in Australia – Ballet, Longmans, Melbourne, 1966
- Van Praagh and Peter Brinson, The choreographic art; an outline of its principles and craft, Adam and Charles Black, London, 1963
