= Antony Tudor =

British dancer and choreographer (1908–1987)

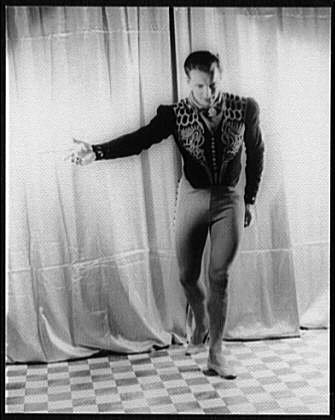
- Tudor in Gala Performance, photographed by Carl Van Vechten, 1941
- Born: William Cook; 4 April 1908; London, England
- Died: 19 April 1987 (aged 79); New York City, U.S.
- Resting place: Ashes in Woodlawn Cemetery

Antony Tudor (born William Cook; 4 April 1908 – 19 April 1987) was an English ballet choreographer, teacher and dancer. He founded the London Ballet, and later the Philadelphia Ballet Guild in Philadelphia, Pennsylvania, U.S., in the mid-1950s.

== Early life and education ==
Tudor was born William Cook in East London, and grew up in the Finsbury area. He discovered dance accidentally. His first exposure to professional ballet was in his late teens when he first saw Sergei Diaghilev's Ballets Russes. He witnessed the dancer Serge Lifar of the Diaghilev Ballet in Balanchine's Apollon Musagète in 1928. Later, the Ballets Russes would introduce him to Anna Pavlova, who further inspired his journey into the world of dance. Tudor reached out to Cyril W. Beaumont, the owner of a ballet book shop in the Charing Cross Road district in London, to seek advice regarding training and was instructed to study with Marie Rambert, a former Diaghilev Ballet dancer who taught the Cecchetti method.

== Career ==
Tudor began dancing professionally with Marie Rambert in 1928, becoming general assistant for her Ballet Club the next year. A precocious choreographer, at age twenty-three he created for her dancers Cross Garter'd, then Lysistrata, The Planets and other works at the little Mercury Theatre, Notting Hill Gate, and his two most revolutionary, Jardin aux lilas (Lilac Garden) and Dark Elegies, before the age of thirty, himself dancing the main roles.

In 1938, Tudor founded the London Ballet with Rambert members, including his future life partner Hugh Laing, Andrée Howard, Agnes de Mille, Peggy van Praagh, Maude Lloyd and Walter Gore. With the onset of World War II, in 1940 he was invited with them to New York, joining Richard Pleasant's and Lucia Chase's reorganised Ballet Theater. Chase's company was later to become the American Ballet Theatre, with which Tudor was closely associated for the rest of his life.

Tudor was a resident choreographer with Ballet Theater for ten years, restaging some of his earlier works but also creating new works, his great Pillar of Fire (1942), Romeo and Juliet, Dim Lustre and Undertow, on that company by the end of the war. Retiring from dancing in 1950, he headed the faculty of the Metropolitan Opera Ballet School, taught at the Juilliard School recurrently from 1950 onwards. He mentored dancers of colour and offered weekly classes at the Philadelphia Ballet Guild, which he established in the mid-1950s. Among others, he taught Carole King, who went on to found the predecessor to the NAISDA Dance College for Aboriginal and Torres Strait Islander students of contemporary dance in Australia.

He was artistic director for the Royal Swedish Ballet from 1963 to 1964. He choreographed three works for the New York City Ballet.

From 1973, Tudor continued his teaching career as professor of ballet technique at the Department of Dance, University of California, Irvine (work curtailed by a serious heart condition), while rejoining American Ballet Theatre in 1974 as associate artistic director, creating The Leaves Are Fading and Tiller in the Fields, his last major work, in 1978. With Laing, he continued seasonal residence in Laguna Beach, California.

Muses for whom specific ballets where created include Maude Lloyd, Hugh Laing and Nora Kaye. While specific ballets were not created for them, Diana Adams and Sallie Wilson can also be considered as muses of Tudor.

As a teacher, Tudor was known for focusing on physical and psychological details to strip away the ego allowing the dancer to be pushed outside their comfort zone and extend their potential. In an interview with Dick Cavett, Tudor said, "You've got to get rid of the personal mannerisms to get to the character in the ballet and dancers don't want to let go. Breaking down a person isn't hard. But you cannot break them down unless you are willing to pick up the ashes right away and turn them into the Phoenix. That's the tough thing. You're terribly tempted to lay them flat and walk on them."

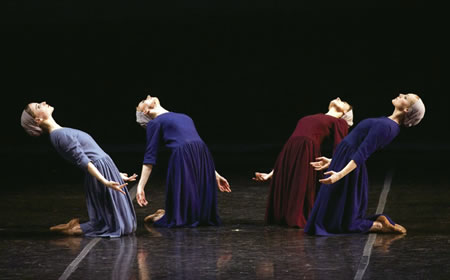
Boston Ballet dancers perform Antony Tudor's Dark Elegies (2008).

== Recognition ==
Tudor was awarded a creative arts medal by Brandeis University, the Dance Magazine and Capezio awards, New York City's Handel Medallion, and both Kennedy Center and Dance/USA National Honors.

Tudor was inducted into the Mr. & Mrs. Cornelius Vanderbilt Whitney Hall of Fame at the National Museum of Dance in 1988.

== Death and legacy ==
A disciplined Zen Buddhist, Tudor died on Easter Sunday in his residence at the First Zen Institute of America, aged 79.

Tudor is generally accepted as one of the great originals of modern dance forms. Along with George Balanchine, he is seen as a principal transformer of ballet into a modern art, but of a genius that uses, rather than proceeds from, ballet forms. His work is usually considered as modern "psychological" expression, but – like their creator – of austerity, elegance and nobility, remarkably primarily using only classical forms. Mikhail Baryshnikov said, "We do Tudor's ballets because we must. Tudor's work is our conscience."

Thirty of Tudor's dances have been documented in Labanotation by the Dance Notation Bureau. The scores' introductory material contains history of the dances, cast lists, stylistic notes, background on Tudor, and information needed to stage the works (costumes, sets, lighting, music).

=== Trust ===
The Antony Tudor Ballet Trust was established to continue staging Tudor's works. His will appointed Sally Brayley Bliss as the sole trustee of his ballets upon his will submission to the Surrogate's Court of the State of New York in 1987.

The trust includes the following répétiteurs: Diana Byer, John Gardner, Airi Hymninen, James Jordan, Donald Mahler, Amanda McKerrow, Christopher Newton, Kirk Peterson, David Richardson, Willy Shives, Lance Westwood, Celia Franca (in memoriam) and Sallie Wilson (in memoriam). Tara McBride is the administrator for the trust.

== Major works ==
(*Ballets available for production)

- Adam and Eve (1932)
- Atalanta of the East (1933)
- Britannia Triumphans (1953)
- Cereus * (1971)
- A Choreographer Comments * (1960)
- Concerning Oracles (1966)
- Constanza's Lament (1932)
- Continuo * (1971)
- Cross Garter'd (1931)
- Dance Studies (less Orthodox) * (1961)
- Dark Elegies * (1937)
- The Day Before Spring (1945)
- The Dear Departed (1949)
- The Decent of Hebe (1935)
- Dim Lustre * (1943)
- The Divine Horsemen * (1969)
- Echoing of Trumpets * (1963)
- Elizabethan Dances (1953)
- Fandango * (1963)
- Exercise Piece * (1953)
- Gala Performance * (1938)
- Galant Assembly (1937)
- La Gloire (1952)
- Goya Pastoral (1940)
- Hail and Farewell (1959)
- Judgment of Paris * (1938)
- Knight Errant (1968)
- Lady of Camellias (1951)
- Leaves are Fading * (1975)
- The Legend of Dick Whittington (1934)
- La Leyenda de Jose (1958)
- Lilac Garden (Jardin Aux Lilas) * (1936)
- Little Improvisations * (1953)
- Lysistrata (1932)
- Les Mains Gauches * (1951)
- Mr. Roll's Quadrilles (1932)
- Nimbus (1950)
- Offenbach in the Underworld *(1954)
- Paramour (1934)
- Pas de Trois * (1956)
- Passamezzi (1962)
- Pavane pour une Infante Defunte (1933)
- Pillar of Fire * (1942)
- The Planets * (1934)
- The Tragedy of Romeo and Juliet * (1943)
- Ronde du Printemps (1951)
- Seven Intimate Dances (1938)
- Shadow of the Wind (1948)
- Shadowplay * (1967)
- Soiree Musicale * (1938)
- Suite of Airs (1937)
- Sunflowers * (1971)
- The Tiller in the Fields (1978)
- Time Table (1941)
- Trio con Brio * (1952)
- Undertow * (1945)

== See also ==
- List of dancers
