= Walter Gore =

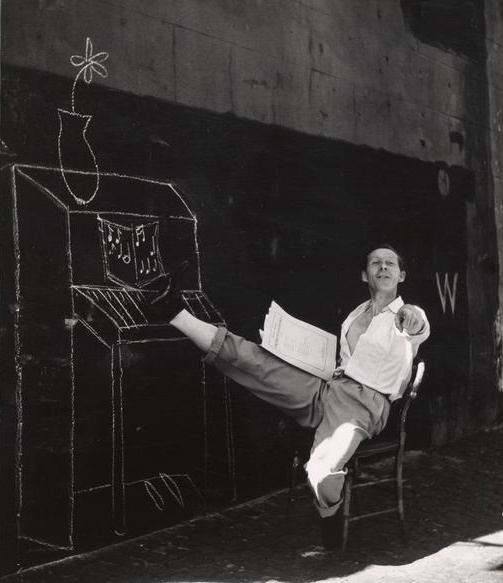
- Ballet Rambert dancer Walter Gore at ‘Merioola’ in Australia, 1948
- Born: 8 October 1910; Waterside, East Ayrshire.Scotland
- Died: 16 April 1979 (aged 68); Pamplona, Spain
- Education: Italia Conti Academy of Theatre Arts
- Occupation: Ballet choreographer
- Years active: 1930-1973
- Notable work: "Confessional" (1941), solo, Sally Gilmour, to Robert Browning's poem The Confessional. For the Ballet Rambert: "Simple Symphony" (1944) music Britten. "Winter Night" (1948), music. Rachmaninov), Sally Gilmour, Paula Hinton and full company to Rachmaninov's 2nd Piano concerto, powerful autobiographical work depicting his leaving Gilmour for Hinton.

Walter Gore (8 October 1910 – 16 April 1979) was a British ballet dancer, company director and choreographer.

== Early life ==
Walter Gore was born in Waterside, East Ayrshire Scotland in 1910 into a theatrical family. From 1924, he studied acting at the Italia Conti Academy, and dance with Léonide Massine and with Marie Rambert.

== Career ==
Gore was a dancer with Ballet Rambert from 1930 to 1935. He returned as a choreographer in 1938 with his first ballet Final Waltz.

In 1944, whilst on leave from Army duty in France, Gore created a ballet based on Benjamin Britten's Simple Symphony also entitled Simple Symphony for the Ballet Rambert. The work was largely created on Sally Gilmour and Margaret Scott.

He remained at Ballet Rambert until 1950 and then worked occasionally with the Ballets des Champs-Elysées and the Sadler's Wells Ballet. He founded his own company, The Walter Gore Ballet, in 1953.

He led the Frankfurt Ballet from 1957 to 1959, then became the founder and director of the London Ballet from 1961 to 1963. At that time he also became director of the recently founded Gulbenkian Ballet, Lisbon. He was also the founder and artistic director of the Australian Theatre Ballet, Melbourne.

He has to his credit more than 80 choreographies.

He also danced on the BBC production "The Mercury Ballet".

== Personal life ==
He met his future wife Paula Hinton while both were dancers in Ballet Rambert.

Gore died on 16 April 1979 in Pamplona, Spain.
