= Rambert Dance Company =

English dance company

Rambert (known as Rambert Dance Company before 2014) is an English dance company. Formed at the start of the 20th century as a classical ballet company, it exerted a great deal of influence on the development of dance in the United Kingdom, and today, as a contemporary dance company, continues to be one of the world's most renowned dance companies. It has previously been known as the Ballet Club, and the Ballet Rambert.

== History ==
Dame Marie Rambert (1888–1982), founder of Rambert Dance Company, was born in Warsaw, Poland where she was inspired to become a dancer after seeing Isadora Duncan perform. She went to Paris and after an early career as a recital artist and teacher she was engaged by Serge Diaghilev's Ballets Russes as assistant to the choreographer Vaslav Nijinsky on The Rite of Spring. She also taught Dalcroze Eurythmics to the company. During her year with the Ballets Russes, her appreciation of classical ballet developed, thus combining a love for traditional and new dance forms.

During the First World War, she settled in England where she met and married the playwright Ashley Dukes. Her association with Diaghilev led her to study ballet with the Italian ballet master Enrico Cecchetti, after which she joined the company as a dancer in the corps de ballet. In 1919, Rambert established a dance school in Notting Hill Gate, London, teaching Checchetti's methods and in 1920, she transitioned into teaching ballet professionally. The school would become the foundation of today's Rambert Dance Company.

In 1926, Rambert formed a dance troupe using students from her school. Known as the Rambert Dancers, they performed in revues at various London venues. In 1930, the troupe was re-established as the Ballet Club at the Mercury Theatre in London, which was owned by Rambert's husband. The Ballet Club was formed using the finest dance talent that Rambert could find, and was to become the first classical ballet company established in the United Kingdom. The present-day Rambert Dance Company is the U.K.'s oldest established dance company. Despite being based at the Mercury Theatre, the company was best known as a touring company, travelling nationwide and soon became known as the Ballet Rambert, the title by which it was most commonly recognised until the current name was adopted in the 1980s.

As the Ballets Russes had disbanded following the Diaghilev' death in 1929, a number of Rambert's former colleagues joined the Ballet Rambert in its formative years, including Alicia Markova and Anton Dolin, who would later become the first stars of Dame Ninette de Valois's Royal Ballet.

A number of internationally renowned dancers and choreographers made their early appearances with the Ballet Rambert, including Frederick Ashton, Antony Tudor, Agnes de Mille, Andrée Howard, Pearl Argyle, Walter Gore and Peggy van Praagh.

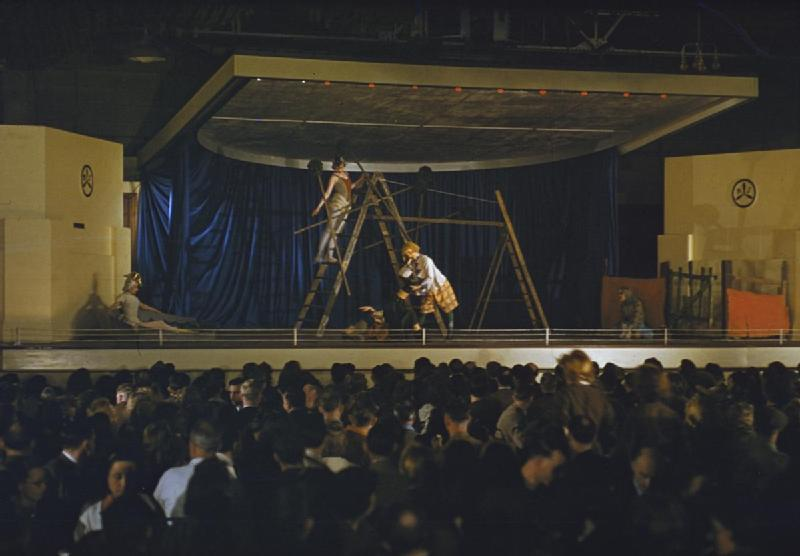
The Ballet Rambert visiting an aircraft factory in Second World War Britain: Dancers from the Ballet Rambert, under the auspices of CEMA (Council for the Encouragement of Music and the Arts). Lunchtime in the canteen. The factory workers seated at their tables watching a production of Peter and the Wolf on the stage.

During the 1970s, the Ballet Rambert also presented shows, first on stage and later via BBC television to engage the interest of a younger audience, using the anagrammatic name Bertram Batell's Side Show.

The art consultant and administrator Adrian Ward-Jackson was the director of the Rambert Dance Company from 1985 until his death in 1991.

Whilst developing a strong ballet culture in Britain and insisting on solid classical training, Rambert always intended that her company would dictate new trends in dance. The Ballet Rambert was recognised as one of the most innovative ballet companies of the 20th century, producing some of the world's most-renowned choreographers. By the middle of the century, the Royal Ballet had superseded the company as the U.K.'s leading classical ballet company, so Rambert made the decision to diversify the work of the company, introducing modern and neoclassical work into the repertoire. In the 1960s, the Ballet Rambert moved completely from classical ballet, concentrating instead on the development of contemporary dance. The company has since developed a worldwide reputation in this field, becoming known as the Rambert Dance Company in 1987. In 2013, Dance Company was dropped from its title, to become simply Rambert.

Rambert's chief executive is Helen Shute and Benoit Swan Pouffer is artistic director.

Rambert is a National Portfolio Organisation of Arts Council England.

=== Members ===
Notable members of the company have included: Frederick Ashton, Antony Tudor, Diana Gould (who married Yehudi Menuhin), Audrey Hepburn, Maude Lloyd, Sally Gilmour, Beryl Goldwyn, Lucette Aldous, Christopher Bruce and Norman Morrice.

=== Artistic director ===
Rambert's artistic director is Benoit Swan Pouffer, an internationally renowned dance artist and company leader. Originally from Paris, Benoit was a principal dancer with the Alvin Ailey American Dance Theater for seven years and then the director of Cedar Lake Contemporary Ballet in New York for ten years. Benoit has choreographed dance for companies around the world, including Rambert and Ailey 2, for feature films, music videos and Broadway shows. Benoit's ability to blend artistically stimulating content with commercially popular work had led to critical acclaim.

Prior to Benoit's tenure, Rambert's artistic directors were:

- Mark Baldwin – dancer with Ballet Rambert (later Rambert Dance Company), 1979–1980, 1983–1992; artistic director of Rambert Dance Company (later Rambert), 2002–2018.
- Christopher Bruce – dancer with Ballet Rambert, 1963–1980, 1983, 1986; associate director of Ballet Rambert, 1975–1979; associate choreographer of Ballet Rambert (later Rambert Dance Company), 1980–1994; artistic director of Rambert Dance Company, 1994–2002; guest artist with Rambert Dance Company, 2000.
- Richard Alston – resident choreographer of Ballet Rambert, 1980–1986; artistic director of Ballet Rambert (later Rambert Dance Company), 1986–1992; dancer with Ballet Rambert, 1980.
- Robert North – associate choreographer of Ballet Rambert, 1975–1981; artistic director of Ballet Rambert, 1981–1985; dancer with Ballet Rambert, 1981–1985.
- John Chesworth – dancer with Ballet Rambert, 1952–1980; associate director of Ballet Rambert, 1970–1974; artistic director of Ballet Rambert, 1974–1980.
- Norman Morris – dancer with Ballet Rambert, 1952–1964; associate artistic director of Ballet Rambert, 1966–1970 (he was in practise the artistic director but refused the title); Co-artistic director of Ballet Rambert, 1970–1974.
- Marie Rambert – founder and artistic director of Rambert, 1926–1974. Marie Rambert was really active as artistic director until 1966, and from 1974 is listed as founder director. In 1957, she was awarded the Legion d’Honneur. In 1962, Rambert was made Dame Commander (DBE), Order of the British Empire.

=== Rambert School ===
The Rambert Ballet School that Rambert founded in 1919, has reinvented itself on a number of occasions since, and due to the changes and innovations of the dance company, three separate schools have operated under the name. Two of these schools later merged and the third closed to leave the school which survives today.

The present-day school is based in premises in Twickenham, London, and was formed in 2001 as part of the West London Institute of Higher Education. This was later subsumed into Brunel University of London and in 2003, the Rambert School became independent again and is now known as the Rambert School of Ballet and Contemporary Dance. It offers a two-year foundation degree, a three-year bachelor's degree, a three-year vocational course, and postgraduate courses to doctoral level. Students go on to achieve positions with dance companies including Dutch National Ballet, Northern Ballet Theatre, Scottish Ballet, Boston Ballet, Netherlands Dance Theatre, Merce Cunningham Dance Company, Richard Alston Dance Company, Rambert Dance Company, Bejart Ballet and Scottish Dance Theatre. The Rambert School is an affiliate of the Conservatoire for Dance and Drama. The current principal and artistic director is Amanda Britton.

== See also ==
- List of dance companies
- List of schools in London

== Bibliography ==
- Marie Rambert (1972). Quicksilver: Autobiography. London: St. Martin's Press. ISBN 0-333-08942-1.
- Clement Crisp (1981). Ballet Rambert: 50 Years and on. London: Ballet Rambert. p. 111. ISBN 0-9505478-1-6.

== Reviews ==
- Ballet Magazine by Lynette Halewood, October 1998
