= Henry Danton =

British ballet dancer and teacher (1919–2022)

- Born: Henry David Boileau Down; 30 March 1919; Bedford, Bedfordshire, England
- Died: 9 February 2022 (aged 102)
- Occupations: Dancer, teacher, ballet master
- Employer: Sadler's Wells Ballet
- Known for: Ballet
- Family: Boileau baronets

Henry Danton (born Henry David Boileau Down; 30 March 1919 – 9 February 2022) was a British dancer, teacher, and stager of classical ballet.

== Life and career ==
Aged 19, he was commissioned from the academy in January 1939 as Second Lieutenant in the Royal Artillery and was promoted to Captain at the outbreak of World War II before being retired from active service in 1940. However, Danton did not receive his final discharge until late in 1945.

Danton was a prolific dancer in London during and immediately after World War II. In the UK, Danton performed as a soloist in the International Ballet partnering Mona Inglesby in Les Sylphides and Swan Lake 1943–44, and with the Sadler's Wells Ballet 1944–46, where he appeared with Margot Fonteyn, Beryl Grey, and Violetta Elvin in the Rose Adagio and Pamela May in Les Sylphides and created leading roles in a number of works, most notably in Sir Frederick Ashton's Symphonic Variations partnering Moira Shearer.

Privately educated with Judith Espinosa, he passed the Royal Academy of Dancing's four exams with honours winning the Adeline Genée Silver Medal after just 18 months of classical ballet training although due to wartime metal shortages it was finally awarded in 2019. During the war Danton studied intensively with the Russian teacher Vera Volkova.

In 1946, he began his international dancing career travelling first to Paris to work with some of the leading Russian teachers of the day, including Victor Gsovsky, and the Imperial Russian Ballet ballerinas Olga Preobrajenska, Lubov Egorova, and Mathilde Kschessinskaya.

As a dancer, Danton appeared with touring ensembles across the UK, Europe, Australasia, and South America partnering ballerinas Svetlana Beriosova, Colette Marchand, Celia Franca, Lycette Darsonval, Sonia Arova, Mia Slavenska, Lynne Golding, and others. As a teacher and balletmaster, he worked extensively across the U.S. and South America for more than 65 years, teaching, coaching, and staging classical repertoire.

An important influence on the nascent national ballet companies in Caracas, Venezuela, and Bogotá, Colombia, he was also the first classical ballet teacher to be employed at the Sarah Lawrence College, Bronxville, and the Martha Graham Center of Contemporary Dance, and taught at the Fokine School of Ballet, Ballet Arts, Carnegie Hall, and the Juilliard School in New York City.

In 2013, aged 95, Danton continued to teach in Hattiesburg, Mississippi and also worked as a guest teacher at a number of schools and colleges including Belhaven University, where he staged Mikhail Fokine's Les Sylphides in the autumn of 2013. Turning 100 in 2019, he was still working.

Danton died on 9 February 2022, at the age of 102.

== Personal life ==
At age 49, Danton was diagnosed with Hodgkin's lymphoma and became a vegetarian at age 49. His brother had died from the same disease. Henry attributed his longevity to his vegetarian diet, dancing and swimming. He owned a vegetarian restaurant in Caracas. His lacto-vegetarian diet consisted of carrot juice, organic vegetables, nuts, seeds and dairy products. Danton was a non-smoker.

== Recognition ==
In 2001, Danton was part of an Artscape documentary film produced by ABC TV Arts about the history of ballet in Australia, Swan Lake – The Australian Ballet at 50. In 1951, Danton had performed the role of Siegfried with Lynne Golding and the National Ballet Theatre in the first full-length Australian production of Swan Lake, in Melbourne and on tour to every large and medium-sized town in Australia. The ballet was also performed on tour in New Zealand.

In the winter of 2007, Danton was celebrated at the Ballet Theatre of Scranton's 50th Anniversary Gala in Scranton, Pennsylvania, when Wall Street Journal columnist and dance critic, Robert Greskovic, paid tribute to Danton's work with the company over more than four decades.

In April 2011, Danton was part of the Ninette de Valois: Adventurous Traditionalist Conference at the Royal Ballet Upper School. In 2011, Danton along with choreographer Gillian Lynne and three other original cast members participated in a revival production of Robert Helpmann's ballet Miracle in the Gorbals. First created in 1944, the dance-drama is set in the notorious Glasgow 1940s slums, with characters including a beggar, a prostitute, a minister, two young lovers, and a suicidal woman.

Danton was an important voice in Ismene Brown's 2012 BBC Radio 4 documentary Blackout Ballet about Mona Inglesby and the International Ballet Company, and was part of the 2014 BBC TV documentary Dancing in the Blitz: How World War Two Made British Ballet.

== Sources ==
- Anderson, Zoë. The Royal Ballet: 75 Years. Faber and Faber, 2007; ISBN 978-0571227969
- Brissenden, Alan. Australia Dances: Creating Australian Dance, 1945–1965. Wakefield Press, 2010; ISBN 978-1862548022
- Greskovic, Robert. Ballet 101: A Complete Guide to Learning and Loving the Ballet. New York City, Limelight Editions, 2005; ISBN 978-0879103255
- Meinertz, Alexander. Vera Volkova, a Biography. Alton, Hampshire: Dance Books, 2007; ISBN 978-1-85273-111-3.
