= Roger Tully =

English dancer and teacher (1928–2020)

- Born: Roger Tully; 3 February 1928; London, England
- Died: 26 February 2020 (aged 92); Haywards Heath, England
- Education: Rambert School
- Occupations: ballet dancer, teacher
- Spouse: Margaret Bicknell
- Children: 1
- Career
- Former groups: International Ballet, Les Grands Ballets Canadiens,

Roger Tully (3 February 1928 – 26 February 2020) was an English dancer and teacher of classical dance.

== Life and career ==
Roger Tully was born in East London. His early studies were with Muriel Green, née Quick, in eurhythmics. Offered a scholarship to the Rambert School, his first teacher of classical dance and mentor was Marie Rambert. After three years with Rambert and his stage début, he studied at London with Lydia Kyasht, Cleo Nordi, Stanislas Idzikowski and Mary Skeaping. This was followed by intensive study with Kathleen Crofton, who had been a student of Olga Preobrajenska, and who then became his principal teacher.

Roger Tully joined Mona Inglesby’s company "The International Ballet", with which he toured Italy. Both Nicholas Sergueyev, who had been régisseur at the Maryinskii, as well as Leonid Massine were with Mona Inglesby at the time, and staged the original Maryinskii productions for her.

In the 1950s, Roger Tully danced in musicals at the Drury Lane Theatre, and then with Walter Gore’s company, where he partnered Gore’s wife Paula Hinton. In the early 1960s, he joined Les Grands Ballets Canadiens, then led by Ludmilla Chiriaeff, where he danced for several years.

On returning to London in the late sixties, he took over Kathleen Crofton’s London students, when Alicia Markova invited Crofton to join her as ballet mistress at the Metropolitan Opera in New York. (In America, with Bronislava Nijinska, Crofton went on to found the Buffalo Ballet, where Nureyev danced a few times. It folded after only eighteen months, when the costumes were burnt up one night.)

In the early 1980s, Roger Tully purchased a late nineteenth-century dance studio at Bedford Gardens, where Marie Rambert had first taught on arriving in England. He began to teach from there, as well as at Pineapple Studios.

When Alexander Sombart was to return to the stage as Eugene Onegin alongside Lynn Seymour as Tatiana, he was coached by Roger Tully. Thereafter, Tully taught at Dance Works for five years, and again coached Alexander Sombart, then Natalia Makarova’s partner, to prepare the latter’s return to the Maryinskii Theatre in 1989.

Roger Tully taught at Bedford Gardens, at Balanssi Studios in Helsinki, and at New York. Among his prominent disciples were Clinton Luckett, Ballet Master at American Ballet Theatre, Daniel Baudendistel, former Joffrey Ballet soloist, now a choreographer and teacher, Francesco Mangiacasale and Julie Cronshaw, the latter both of London. In November 2006 and February 2007, Roger Tully was invited by the ‘Inspection des Conservatoires’ of the City of Paris to teach a series of master-classes. In February 2007 and again in January/February 2008, Roger Tully taught master classes at the Accademia nazionale di danza at Rome.

The essential difference between what Roger Tully taught, and what is more generally seen today, is defined in a statement by one of his leading students, thus,

"The first idea was that all movement takes place through the play of oppositions around a central axis in the body, and that it is essential this axis be firmly established and maintained throughout one’s work [which he explains and illustrates] through the close study of major works of sculpture and painting.

"The second, and perhaps more fundamental, idea Roger inculcated was the concept that all movement in the body is motivated in or from the torso. (...) Indeed most of his enchainement were designed specifically to make one aware of this. To me it was a revelation to finally locate the source of movement deep in the body, and not merely in the use of the legs and arms - however well coordinated or articulated they might be."

Roger Tully was the author of a book on the principles underlying technique, The Song sings the Bird, a French translation of which is currently in preparation.

Early in his career, Roger Tully choreographed (and designed) two short ballets which revealed his thorough understanding of classical and romantic ballet, and presented with a fluent development, grace and robustness.

== Works ==
- Prémices du geste dansant: Manuel d'apprentissage de la danse classique (Prelude to the dance gesture: Handbook of learning classical dance) (2009)
