= Jelko Yuresha =

British ballet dancer (1937–2020)

- Born: Željko Jureša; 9 May 1937; Zagreb, Croatia
- Died: 8 July 2020 (aged 83)
- Citizenship: British
- Education: Legat School of Ballet
- Occupations: Dancer; Choreographer; Costume Designer; Painter
- Years active: 1958–1987
- Partner: Belinda Wright (1961–2007)

Jelko Yuresha (9 May 1937 – 8 July 2020) was a British ballet dancer and choreographer. He and his wife, ballerina Belinda Wright, toured internationally as "Ambassadors of Dance" for the United Kingdom from 1966 to 1977.

In 1959 he partnered with Wright for the first time at a Royal Command Performance before Queen Elizabeth the Queen Mother.

== Early life ==
Jelko Yuresha was born Željko Jureša in Zagreb, Croatia. His stepfather, Andrija, was a shoemaker and his mother, Slavica, a seamstress. During World War II his family was forced to live in underground bunkers because of the occupation by the German army. Between 1944 and 1945 Zagreb suffered constant bombing by the Allies and his family survived barely at subsistence level. Despite these hardships Yuresha began performing with the children's theatre of Zagreb's Artistic School at age six. He studied dance under choreographer Mile Jovanović in Zagreb. On his eighth birthday in 1945, Yugoslav Partisans liberated his hometown.

He studied dance under Mile Jovanović in Zagreb and soon after was accepted by the International Ballet School in Kaštel Kambelovac near Split at the end of 1952 where he came under the tutelage of Ana Roje, the Prima Ballerina of the Croatian ballet. Yuresha advanced rapidly through the corps de ballet to soloist with prominent roles.

== Professional career in London ==
In 1958 at age 20, Jelko Yuresha emigrated to England, later gaining United Kingdom citizenship. He studied in Kent at Legat School of Ballet, today part of the St. Bede's School Trust. Yuresha was a student of Russian prima ballerina Nadine Nicolaeva-Legat.

Yuresha made his professional debut as a first guest artist with the newly formed Irish Theatre Ballet in Dublin. At the 1959 Hastings Musical Festival held in the White Rock Theatre, Hastings, England, he performed his own choreography in a pas de deux. He was awarded first prize at the festival.

He joined London Festival Ballet (today English National Ballet) in 1959. On 23 June 1959, Yuresha partnered with Belinda Wright at a Royal Command Performance before Queen Elizabeth the Queen Mother in Manchester. He danced in the BBC Eurovision production of Sleeping Beauty with the legendary prima ballerina Dame Margot Fonteyn starring in the title role on 20 December 1959.

Yuresha joined the Royal Ballet in 1962, the same month as another Eastern European émigré, Rudolph Nureyev, joined the company. Wright followed Yuresha to the Royal Ballet, and the pair continued their dance partnership in dozens of performances. Yuresha danced with the Royal Ballet until 1965. He worked with some of the top choreographers and directors of the era, including Sir Frederick Ashton, Vladimir Bourmeister, Serge Lifar, Leonid Massine, and Bronislava Nijinska.

Massine chose Yuresha for the lead role in Le Bal des Voleurs (Thieves' Carnival) at Covent Garden in 1963, where he partnered with Carla Fracci. Other important roles included Signor Midas in John Cranko's The Lady and the Fool, Albrecht in Giselle, and the prince in Sleeping Beauty, which he danced with Belinda Wright. In 1971 he worked with Nijinska in her production of Les Noces (The Wedding) the final time the remarkable ballet was personally directed by her.

== Personal life ==
Jelko Yuresha and Belinda Wright married on 4 November 1961, in the Town Hall, Chelsea, Kings Road. A grand reception followed at the Savoy Hotel. Born in Southport, England, Wright (1929–2007) trained in Paris with Olga Preobrajenska and in London with Kathleen Crofton. After World War II, she became a soloist and principal dancer at a number of prominent international ballet companies, including Ballet Rambert, Roland Petit's Les Ballets de Paris, London Festival Ballet (now English National Ballet), Le Grand Ballet du Marquis de Cuevas, Companie de Golovine, London Dance Theatre, and the Royal Ballet.

The couple's daughter, Annabel Lisa Yuresha, was born in 1962 in London. She became an actress, appearing in the Doctor Who story Paradise Towers. After a short maternity leave, Wright returned to the stage. On leaving the Royal Ballet, Yuresha and Wright toured England, Scotland, and Ireland as guest stars with the Harlequin Ballet 1965–1966.

In 1967 Yuresha and Wright were invited to represent England as "Ambassadors of Dance" of the British government. For ten years they traveled the world under the auspices of the British Council, performing in grand theaters of cosmopolitan cities and humble venues in developing nations. They introduced audiences large and small to the art of ballet. Their tours took them to Cuba, Cyprus, Greece, Israel, Mozambique, New Zealand, Venezuela, and many other cities. They toured across Europe, Southeast Asia, and Central America. In Barbados they danced in a school hall. In the high altitudes of Bogota and Mexico City they had to use oxygen masks in rehearsals and off stage. Yuresha and Wright presented dances from Swan Lake, Nutcracker, Sleeping Beauty, and Don Quixote. Dancing pas de deux and other forms of dance, the partners were often the first ballet dancers the audiences had ever seen in a live performance.

== Partners ==
Some of the professional ballerinas Jelko Yuresha partnered with:

- Jennifer Alderton
- Tessa Beaumont
- Marilyn Carr
- Deirdre O’Conaire
- Patricia Deane-Gray
- Olga Ferri
- Carla Fracci
- Gaye Fulton
- Margot Fonteyn
- Paula Hinton
- Janet Kedge
- Anya Linden
- Monica Mason
- Jeannette Minty
- Herci Munitic-Marsden
- Nina Novak
- Merle Park
- Georgina Parkinson
- Joan Potter
- Dianne Richards
- Ana Roje
- Antoinette Sibley
- Lidija Sotlar
- Ghislaine Thesmar
- Anna Truscott
- Diane Westerman
- Belinda Wright

== Sir Anton Dolin mentorship ==
One of the most significant influences on the careers of both Jelko Yuresha and Belinda Wright was the English dancer and choreographer Sir Anton Dolin (1904–1983). Wright was just five years old when she met Dolin at a school performance. Yuresha and Dolin were introduced in 1956 when Dolin travelled to Croatia to stage Giselle with the Split Ballet. Dolin established London Festival Ballet (today English National Ballet) in 1950 with ballerina Alicia Markova and impresario Julian Braunsweg. Yuresha joined the company in 1959 and became a principal dancer. Upon Dolin's death, the couple inherited the rights to his choreography of Giselle, Pas de Quatre, and his acclaimed original ballet, Variations for Four. Yuresha and Wright danced—and later staged—productions of these ballets with dance companies around the world, designing original costumes and sets for those performances.

Yuresha restaged Variations for Four in 1999 for American Ballet Theatre at the Metropolitan Opera House in New York. He has since staged it at the Théâtre des Champs-Élysées in Paris, the Tetsuya Kumakawa Ballet in Japan, and at schools in Europe and the United States. In October 2016 he choreographed the piece in Moscow at the Grand Kremlin Palace gala for the "Stars of Ballet in the 21st Century."

== Teaching and choreography ==
Yuresha began teaching in 1977 as a guest teacher at master classes in London. He has taught ballet at Dance Works, Dance Centre London, at the London Studio Centre, and has been a guest teacher at ballet schools in Kuala Lumpur, Milan, and Zurich. Yuresha has also been a judge in scholarship competitions at the Legat School and the Royal Academy of Dance.

He continued part-time choreography work in 1984 with Cinderella to Prokofiev's music for the Icelandic National Ballet. His choreography career has taken him to Austria, China, and New Zealand where he has staged Pas de Sylph, La Peri, and Giselle. In 1994 Yuresha began work with National Ballet of Panama and makes frequent trips to Panama City. In 2013 he staged La Peri and worked on a production of Vasily Medvedev's Coppelia, as well as other works.

He served as a judge and advisor at the Valentina Kozlova International Ballet Competition (VKIBC). Competitions that Yuresha participated were held in Brussels, New York, and New Orleans.

== Retirement ==
In 1987 Jelko Yuresha retired from dancing at age 50 due to longtime pain from a back injury. He took up painting, costume and set design, writing, and collecting art. Yuresha and Wright relocated to New York in 1983 and to a second home in Switzerland in 1989.

As a writer Yuresha has contributed to Dancing Times, Ballet Today UK, The Dance Chronicle USA, London Evening Standard, and other publications.

The papers of Jelko Yuresha and Belinda Wright were donated to the Jerome Robbins Dance Division of the New York Public Library in 2007. This includes correspondence, programs, articles, costume and set designs, sketches, and photographs. His correspondence is also included in Chicago's Newberry Research Library Ann Barzel Papers. Yuresha has donated the couple's costumes and original artwork to the Zagreb Museum of Arts and Crafts.

Title	Authors	Publisher	Year
A Dictionary of Ballet	G.B.L. Wilson	Cassel & Company LTD, London	1961
The Dance Encyclopedia	Anatole Chujoy, P.W. Manchester	Simon & Schuster, New York	1967
The Dance Encyclopedia (revised)	Anatole Chujoy, P.W. Manchester	Simon & Schuster, New York	1968
Friedrich's Ballet Lexicon von A–Z	Horst Koegler	Friedrich Verlag, Hannover	1972
The Concise Oxford Dictionary of Ballet	Horst Koegler	Oxford University Press, Oxford	1977
Rečnik Baleta	Ferdinand Reyna	IRO Vuk Karadzić, Belgrade	1980
