= Sergeyev Collection =

Coreography notation collection

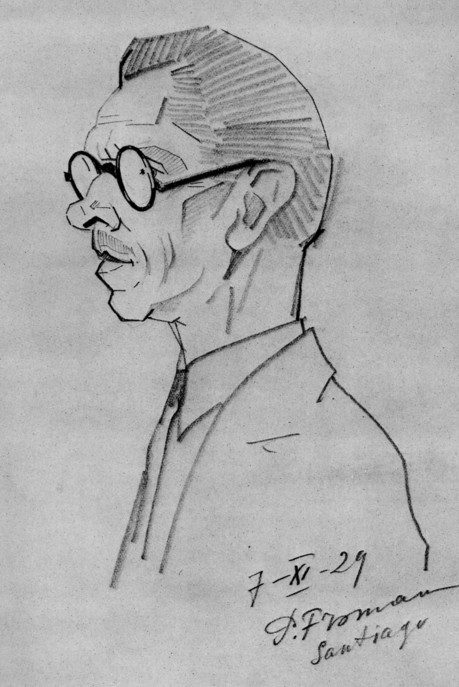
A drawing of Nicholas Sergeyev by Pavel Froman, 1929. Courtesy of the Harvard Theatre Collection.

The Sergeyev Collection (officially Nikolai Sergeev Dance Notations and Music Scores for Ballets) is an assemblage of materials that document the repertory of the Imperial Ballet of St. Petersburg as it existed at the turn-of-the 20th century. The collection consists primarily of choreographic notation and music for many of the notated works. Also included are designs for stage décor and costumes, photos, and theatre programmes for performances of the Imperial Ballet at the turn-of-the 20th century. The choreographic notations of the Sergeyev Collection record—in varying degrees of detail—the original works and revivals of the choreographer Marius Petipa, who served as Premier Maître de ballet of the St. Petersburg Imperial Theatres from 1871 until 1903. Also included is notation for choreography by Lev Ivanov, who served as Second Maître de ballet of the St. Petersburg Imperial Theatres from 1885 until his death in 1901. The dance sections of several operas are also among the notated choreographies of the Sergeyev Collection, the majority of which are the work of Petipa and Ivanov, respectively.

The collection is named for Nicholas Sergeyev, former dancer and régisseur-général of the St. Petersburg Imperial Theatres, who brought the collection out of Russia after the Russian Revolution of 1917. Since 1969 these materials have been held in the Harvard Theatre Collection at Houghton Library.

== History of the collection ==
By the late 19th century in Saint Petersburg, Russia the choreographer of the Imperial Ballet Marius Petipa and the Ballet Master Lev Ivanov were approaching the end of their long and distinguished careers. In an age before film, Ivanov was much relied upon to recall the company's repertory, as he had a memory that was capable of remembering all intricacies of staging and choreography in Petipa's multi-act Grand ballets and even works that were long-gone from the repertory.

By 1893, the dancer Vladimir Stepanov had developed a new method of recording choreography, and he would propose recording the St. Petersburrepertory to the Imperial Ballet's committee. The project as proposed by Stepanov was of great interest to the Imperial Ballet's committee, which made decisions on the appointment of dancers, repertory, etc. The committee, which consisted of Petipa (Premier Maître de ballet of the St. Petersburg Imperial Theatres) and Ivanov (second Maître de Ballet), as well as Ekaterina Vazem (former Prima ballerina of the Imperial Theatres and teacher of the classe de perfection), Pavel Gerdt (Premier danseur of the Imperial Theatres), and Christian Johansson (former Premier danseur of the Imperial Theatres and teacher at the school) now required that Stepanov first present demonstrations, known as "certifications", on the effectiveness of his new method before the project would be implemented.

The first of these demonstrations was the notation of Lev Ivanov's one-act ballet La Flûte magique, which was staged for the Imperial Ballet School in 1893. The second demonstration was a revival of Jules Perrot's one-act ballet of 1848 Le Rêve du peintre, which was staged by Stepanov for the Imperial Ballet School, the first performance being given on 23 April [O.S. 11 April] 1893. Stepanov staged Le Rêve du peintre from notations he prepared from consultations with Christian Johansson, who had danced the principal male role. Based on the success of these demonstrations, the proposed notation project was approved and Stepanov soon set to work documenting the repertory of the Imperial Ballet. Among the first works to be notated was Petipa's 1894 ballet Le Réveil de Flore followed by the scene Le jardin animé from the ballet Le Corsaire.

After Stepanov's death in 1896, the dancer Alexander Gorsky took over the notation project. After Gorsky departed St. Petersburg in 1900 to take up the post of Maître de ballet to the Bolshoi Theatre of Moscow, the Imperial Ballet's régisseur Nicholas Sergeyev succeeded him to supervise the notation project. By the early 1900s Sergeyev had assistants aiding him in preparing the notations: Alexander Chekrygin (ru: Чекрыгин, Александр Иванович, Victor Rakhmanov, Nikolay Kremnev (ru: Николай Кремнев), and S. Ponomaryev (ru: С. Пономарев).

After the revolution of 1917, Nicholas Sergeyev left Russia with all of the notations as well as a great deal of music and other materials relating to the documented works.

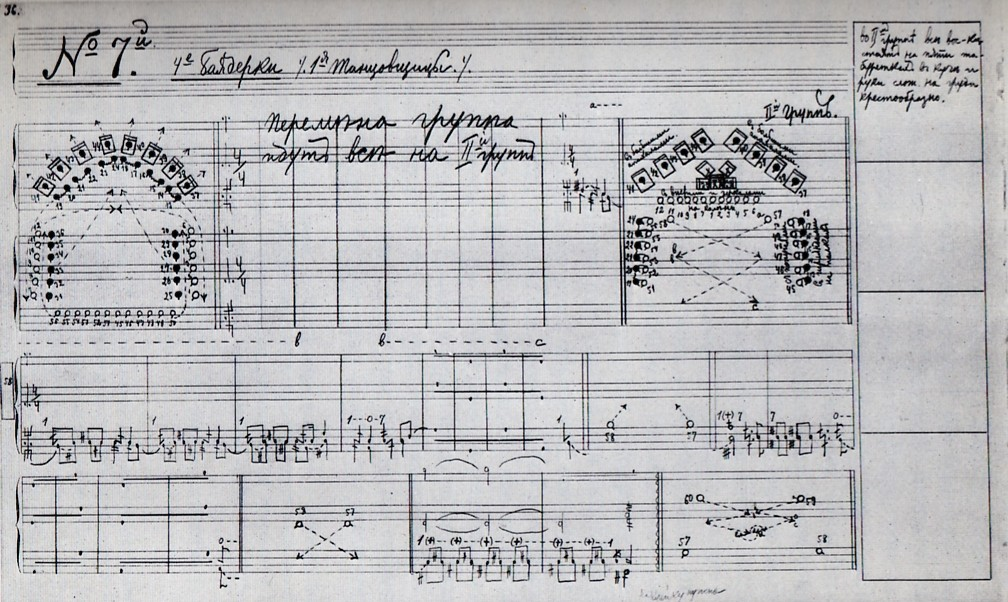
A page of the Stepanov choreographic notation for the Petipa/Minkus La Bayadère, circa 1900. Courtesy of the Harvard Theatre Collection.

In 1921 Sergeyev took over the post of régisseur to the ballet troupe of the Latvian National Opera in Riga, and during his appointment with the company he added more materials belonging to the notated ballets. Piano scores and orchestral parts for some of the ballets was also added, such as Paquita by Édouard Deldevez, The Little Humpbacked Horse by Cesare Pugni, and Adolphe Adam's scores for Giselle and Le Corsaire among others.

In 1920 Sergeyev was invited by Sergei Diaghilev to stage The Sleeping Beauty for the Ballets Russes in Paris, but Diaghilev's insistence on altering passages of Petipa's choreography caused Sergeyev to withdraw his services.

Sergeyev utilized the notation to mount Giselle for the Paris Opera Ballet in 1924, with the ballerina Olga Spessivtseva in the title role and Anton Dolin as Albrecht. This was not only the first time that the Parisian ballet had danced Giselle since the 1860s, but also the first production outside of Russia to include the old choreographic text as preserved under Petipa and his predecessors in St. Petersburg.

At the invitation of Ninette de Valois, Sergeyev staged many works from the notations for the Vic-Wells/Sadler's Wells Ballet (precursor of the Royal Ballet) in London: Coppélia (1933), Swan Lake (1934), The Nutcracker (1934), Giselle (1934) and The Sleeping Beauty as The Sleeping Princess (1939). Sergeyev also began staging works with the aid of the notations in 1942 for the International Ballet, a British touring company founded in 1941 by the ballerina Mona Inglesby.

The Sadler's Wells Ballet staged a new production of The Sleeping Beauty in 1946 to re-open the Royal Opera House. The production featured a heavily altered choreographic text that angered Sergeyev to such an extent that he left the company. At the invitation of Inglesby, Sergeyev soon took up the post of Ballet Master to the International Ballet. Sergeyev's stagings for both of these British companies formed the nucleus of what is now known loosely as the "classical ballet repertory", and as a result these works went on to be staged all over the world in versions derived from Sergeyev's stagings.

Nicholas Sergeyev died in Nice, France on 23 June 1951. Upon his death the collection passed on briefly to a Russian associate of his, from whom Mona Inglesby purchased them. Through the London theatrical dealer Ifan Kyrle Fletcher, Inglesby sold the notations for Swan Lake to the Harvard Theatre Collection in 1967. Two years later in 1969 Inglesby sold Harvard the rest of the collection of Sergeyev's materials for a sum claimed to be around £6,000. In 2024, Harvard Library digitized the entirety of its holdings concerning The Sergeyev Collection. The Swan Lake group can be found here, while the balance of other ballet notations and scores can be found here.

== Noted use of the collection in modern times ==
- 1984 — the historians Peter Wright and the musicologist/professor Roland John Wiley used the notation to assist in staging a new production of The Nutcracker for the Royal Ballet.
- 1999 — Sergei Vikharev used the notation to assist in staging a new production of The Sleeping Beauty for the Mariinsky Ballet. The décor and costumes were created from the designs prepared for the first production of 1890.
- 2001 — Sergei Vikharev used the notation to assist in staging a new production of La Bayadère for the Mariinsky Ballet. The décor and costumes were created from the designs prepared for Marius Petipa's final revival of the ballet in 1900.
- 2001 — Sergei Vikharev used the notation to assist in staging a new production of Coppélia for the Novosibirsk Opera and Ballet Theatre. In 2008, Vikharev staged this version for the Bolshoi Ballet. The décor and costumes of the Bolshoi Theatre's production were created from designs prepared for the Imperial Ballet's production of 1894.
- 2004 — with the assistance of Manard Stewart, Doug Fullington used the notation to stage a reconstruction of Marius Petipa's original choreography for the scene Le Jardin animé from the ballet Le Corsaire for the Pacific Northwest Ballet School's annual recital at the Seattle Opera House.
- 2006 — Doug Fullington used the notation to assist Ivan Liśka in staging a new production of Le Corsaire for the Bayerisches Staatsballett.
- 2007 — Alexei Ratmansky and Yuri Burlaka used the notations to assist in staging a new production of Le Corsaire for the Bolshoi Ballet.
- 2007 — Doug Fullington presented a lecture-demonstration staged for the Pacific Northwest Ballet using the notations to reconstruct various dances. These dances were performed with examples of George Balanchine's choreography in order to demonstrate Petipa's influence on the work of Balanchine.
- 2007 — Sergei Vikharev used the notation to assist in staging a production of Marius Petipa's ballet Le Réveil de Flore for the Mariinsky Ballet. The décor and costumes were created from the designs prepared for the original production of 1894.
- 2008 — Yuri Burlaka used the notation to assist in staging Marius Petipa's Grand Pas classique, Pas de trois and Mazurka des enfants from Paquita for the Bolshoi Ballet.
- 2009 — Yuri Burlaka and Vassily Medvedev used the notation to assist in staging a production of La Esmeralda for the Bolshoi Ballet. The décor and costumes were created from designs prepared for Marius Petipa's final revival of 1899 for the Imperial Ballet's. Designs for décor prepared for the Bolshoi Theatre's production of the turn-of-the 20th century were also used.
- 2011 — Sergei Vikharev used the notation to assist in staging a new production of Marius Petipa's ballet Raymonda for the Teatro alla Scala. The décor and costumes were created from designs prepared for the original production of 1898.
- 2011 — Doug Fullington used the notation to assist Peter Boal in staging a production of Giselle for the Pacific Northwest Ballet.
- 2012 — Doug Fullington used the notation to present the program After Petipa for Works and Process at the Guggenheim. The program featured reconstructions of passages from Swan Lake and The Sleeping Beauty.
- 2013 — Doug Fullington and Marian Smith used the notation to present the program Giselle Revisited for Works and Process at the Guggenheim.
- 2013 — Vasily Medvedev and Yuri Burlaka used the notation to assist in staging a production of The Nutcracker for the Bayerisches Staatsballett. The décor and costumes were created from the designs prepared for the first production of 1892.
- 2014 — Doug Fullington used the notation to present the program Petipa Exotique for Works and Process at the Guggenheim. The program featured reconstructions of dances from Marius Petipa's ballets La Bayadère and Le Roi Candaule as well as Le Corsaire.
- 2014 — Doug Fullington and Alexei Ratmansky used the notation to assist in staging a new production of Paquita for the Bayerisches Staatsballett.
- 2015 — Sergei Vikharev used the notation to assist in staging a production of La fille mal gardée for the Ural Opera Ballet Theatre.
- 2015 — Doug Fullington and Alexei Ratmansky used the notation to assist in staging a production of The Sleeping Beauty for a joint project between American Ballet Theatre and the Teatro alla Scala. The décor and costumes were created from designs prepared by Léon Bakst for the Ballets Russes production of The Sleeping Princess in 1921.
- 2016 — Doug Fullington used the notation for the program Commedia dell'arte Explored for Works and Process at the Guggenheim. The program featured reconstructions of passages from Petipa's Les Millions d'Arléquin.
- 2016 — Alexei Ratmansky used the notation to assist in staging a production of Swan Lake for the Zürich Ballet.
- 2018 — Alexei Ratmansky used the notation to assist in staging a new production of Marius Petipa's ballet Les Millions d'Arléquin as Harlequinade for American Ballet Theatre. The production was later staged by the Australian Ballet in 2022. The décor and costumes were created from designs prepared for the Imperial Ballet's original production of 1900.
- 2019 — Alexei Ratmansky used the notation to assist in staging a production of Giselle for the Bolshoi Ballet.
- 2021 — Stanislav Belyaevsky used the notation to assist in staging a production of Marius Petipa's ballet Les Ruses d'amour as The Trial of Damis at the Theatre of the Hermitage Museum.
- 2023 — the choreographer Toni Candeloro and the Stepanov choreographic notation expert Juan Bockamp used the notation to assist in staging a production of The Pharaoh's Daughter for the Mariinsky Ballet. The décor and costumes were created by Robert Perdziola and were inspired by designs prepared for the Imperial Ballet's productions of 1885 and 1898.
- 2026 — the choreographer and the Stepanov choreographic notation expert Juan Bockamp staged from Sergeyev’s notations a production of Lev Ivanov’s ballet The Enchanted Forest for the youth company and school of the Centro de Dança do Porto. The costumes were designed and created by Rita Tojal.

== Works documented in the collection ==
- Paquita Petipa, after Mazilier (music: Deldevez) – 3 acts
- Giselle Petipa, after Coralli and Perrot (music: Adam) – 2 acts
- The Sleeping Beauty Petipa (music: Tchaikovsky) – Prologue and 3 acts
- The Nutcracker Ivanov?; Petipa? (music: Tchaikovsky) – 2 acts/3 tableaux
- Le Réveil de Flore Petipa (music: Drigo) – 1 act
- La Fille mal gardée Petipa and Ivanov, after Taglioni (music: Hertel) – 3 acts/4 tableaux
- Swan Lake Petipa & Ivanov, after Reisinger (music: Tchaikovsky; rev. Drigo) – 3 acts/4 tableaux
- Coppélia Petipa & Cecchetti, after Saint-Léon (music: Delibes) – 2 acts
- Les Caprices du Papillon Petipa (music: Krotkov) – 1 Act
- The Little Humpbacked Horse Petipa (1895) and Gorsky (1912), after Saint-Léon (music: Pugni) – 4 acts/10 tableaux
- Le Halte de Cavalerie Petipa (music: Armshiemer) – 1 Act
- Raymonda Petipa (music: Glazunov) – 3 acts/4 tableaux
- La Esmeralda Petipa, after Perrot (music: Pugni) – 3 acts/5 tableaux
- The Pharaoh's Daughter Petipa (music: Pugni) – 4 acts/7 tableaux
- Le Corsaire Petipa, after Mazilier (music: Adam, etc.) – 3 acts/5 tableaux
- Les Millions d'Arlequin (a.k.a. Harlequinade) Petipa (music: Drigo) – 2 acts
- Les Ruses d'Amour Petipa (music: Glazunov) – 1 act
- The Pupils of Dupré Petipa (music: Vizentini) – 2 acts (abridgement of Petipa's 1886 ballet L'Ordre du Roi)
- La Bayadère Petipa (music: Minkus) – 4 acts
- Le Roi Candaule Petipa (music: Pugni) – 4 acts/6 tableaux
- La Forêt enchantée Ivanov and Petipa (music: Drigo) – 1 act
- La Flûte magique Ivanov (music: Drigo) – 1 act
- The Fairy Doll Nikolai Legat and Sergei Legat (music: Bayer, etc.) – 1 act/2 tableaux
- Songe du Rajah (1930 - Nicholas Sergeyev's version of the scene The Kingdom of the Shades from Petipa's La Bayadère)
- Small Balletic Pieces - numerous items from various ballets.
- Ballet sections from 24 operas
