= Moira Shearer =

Scottish ballerina and actress (1926–2006)

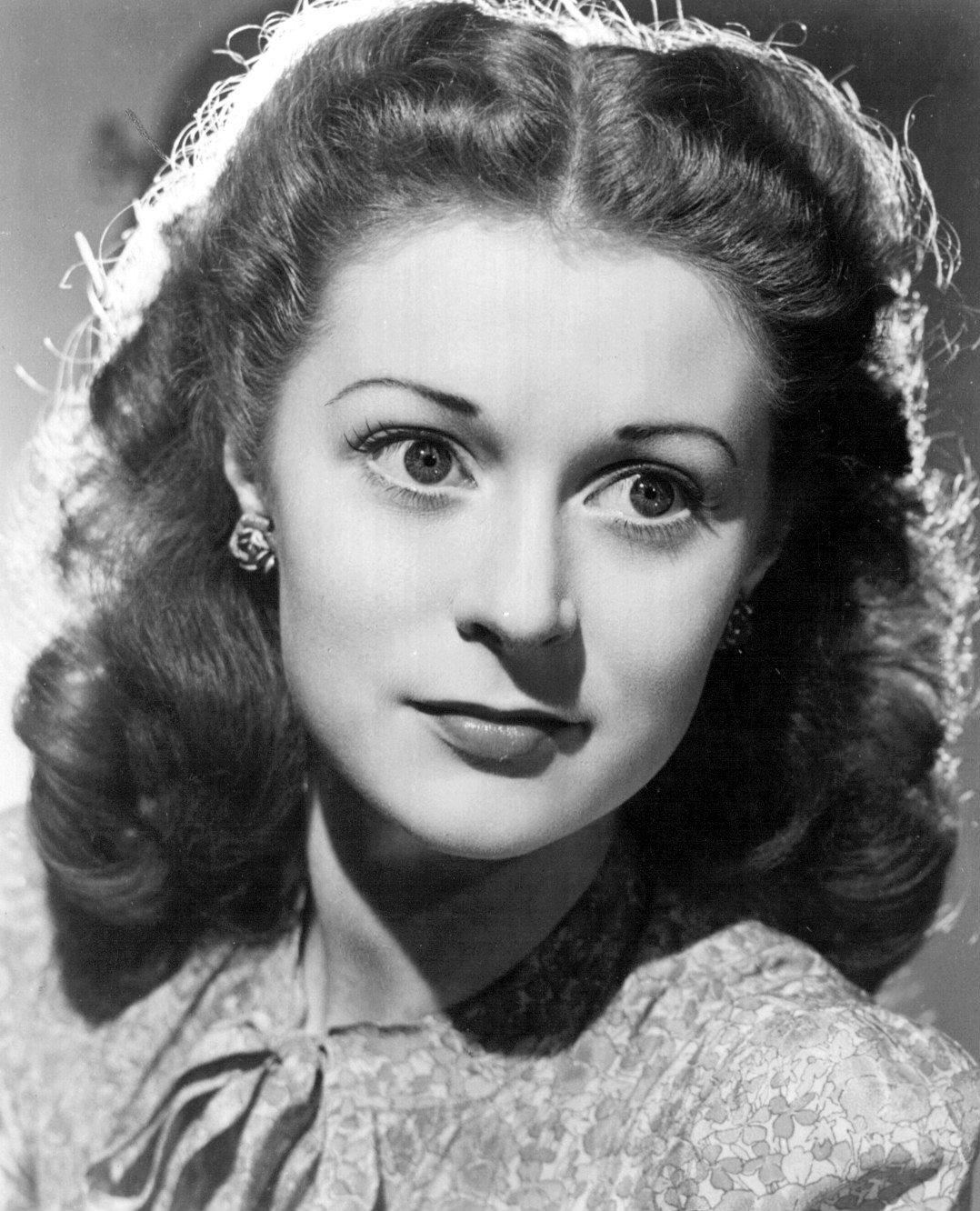
- Shearer in 1954
- Born: Moira Shearer King; 17 January 1926; Dunfermline, Fife, Scotland
- Died: 31 January 2006 (aged 80); Oxford, England
- Other name: Lady Kennedy (from 1994)
- Years active: 1938–1987
- Spouse: Sir Ludovic Kennedy (m. 1950)
- Children: 4

Moira Shearer King, Lady Kennedy (17 January 1926 – 31 January 2006) was a Scottish ballet dancer and actress. She was famous for her performances in Powell and Pressburger's The Red Shoes (1948) and The Tales of Hoffman (1951), and Michael Powell's Peeping Tom (1960).

== Early life ==
She was born Moira Shearer King at Morton Lodge in Dunfermline, Fife, Scotland, in 1926, the only child of civil engineer Harold Charles King and Margaret Crawford Reid, née Shearer. In 1931 her family moved to Ndola, Northern Rhodesia, where her father worked as a civil engineer and where she received her first dancing training under a former pupil of Enrico Cecchetti, focussed on the Russian dance curriculum. The family returned to Scotland when she was 10. She was educated at Dunfermline High School and Bearsden Academy.

When she returned to Britain with her parents in 1936, her mother took her to the London studio of the Russian ballet master Nicholas Legat. The studio manager, assuming that Shearer was a beginner, referred them to Flora Fairbairn, a well-regarded teacher of young dancers starting out. Three months later, by chance, Legat saw Shearer dance in a private recital and reportedly remarked, "This is no beginner," and accepted her as a pupil.

== Dance career ==
At Legat's studio she met the dancer and choreographer Mona Inglesby, who gave Shearer a part in her new ballet Endymion, presented at an all star matinee at the Cambridge Theatre in 1938. After three years at the Legat studio, she joined the Sadler's Wells Ballet School at 14. After the outbreak of the Second World War, her parents took her to live in Scotland. She joined Mona Inglesby's International Ballet for its 1941 provincial tour and West End season before moving on to Sadler's Wells in 1942.

Shearer's breakthrough role in her post-war dance career was her Sadler's Wells performance as Princess Aurora, the lead female role in The Sleeping Beauty on 1 March 1946. Margot Fonteyn had danced Princess Aurora on the gala opening night, 20 February 1946; Pamela May took the role the following night, and Shearer assumed the role a week later. The reviewer in The Manchester Guardian praised her "extraordinary elegance and grace ... these are unteachable things, enchanting beyond technique."

Other notable performances in this period include Shearer's role in Frederick Ashton's Symphonic Variations, which debuted at Covent Garden in April 1946, with Fonteyn in the lead female role, and her interpretation of Swanhilda, the principal female role in Coppelia in October of that year, which one reviewer praised as "a performance memorable in her own career as well as in the annals of British ballet."

During Shearer's career at Sadler's Wells, the prima ballerina of the company was Margot Fonteyn. Shearer, seven years younger than Fonteyn, was among a group of talented younger dancers, including Beryl Grey and Violetta Elvin, who entered the company after the Second World War. In her autobiography, Fonteyn recognised their talents, saying of Shearer, "Then came Moira Shearer, with her incredible airy lightness and ease, to be a real threat to my position. Moira was young, fresh, beautiful and different." For as long as she remained at Sadler's Wells, Shearer and Fonteyn were both colleagues and competitors.

== Film career ==
Shearer first came to the public's attention as Posy Fossil in the advertisements for the Noel Streatfeild book Ballet Shoes while she was training under Flora Fairbairn, a good friend of Streatfeild.

She achieved international success with her first film role as Victoria Page in the Powell and Pressburger ballet-themed film The Red Shoes, (1948). The role and film were so powerful that although she went on to star in other films and worked as a dancer for many decades, she is primarily known for playing "Vicky".

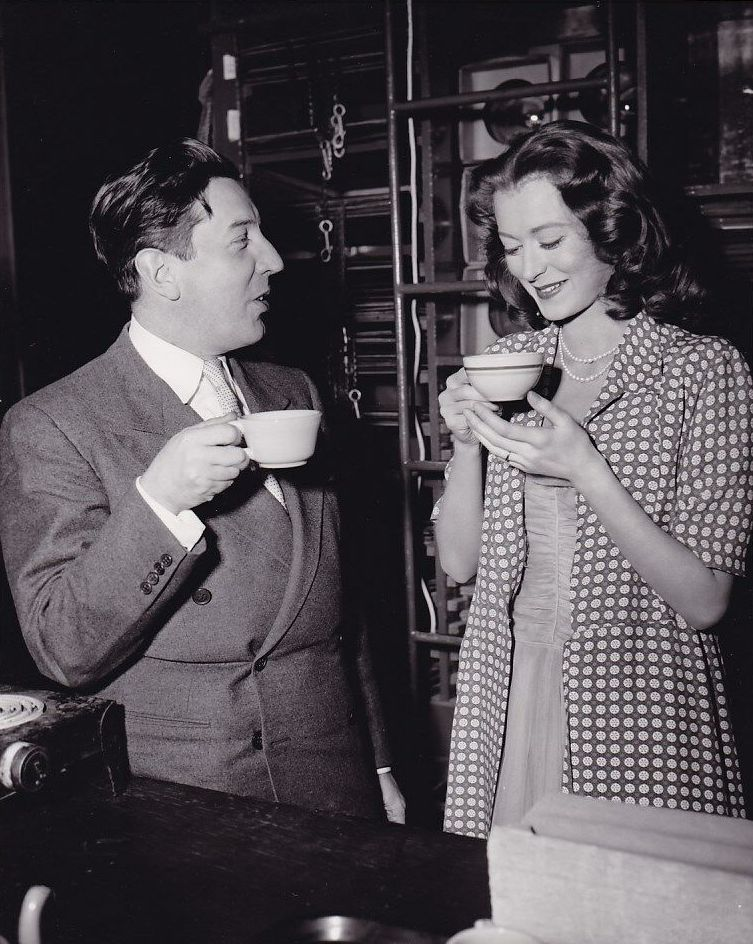
With Frederick Ashton, 1952, during the filming of The Story of Three Loves.

Shearer retired from ballet in 1953, but she continued to act, appearing as Titania in A Midsummer Night's Dream at the 1954 Edinburgh Festival. She worked again for Powell in the films The Tales of Hoffmann (1951) and Peeping Tom (1960), which was controversial at the time of release and damaged Powell's own career.

In 1972, she was chosen by the BBC to present the Eurovision Song Contest when it was staged at the Usher Hall in Edinburgh. She also wrote for The Daily Telegraph newspaper and gave talks on ballet worldwide.

The choreographer Gillian Lynne persuaded her to return to ballet in 1987 to play L. S. Lowry's mother in A Simple Man for the BBC.

== Personal life ==
In 1950, Moira Shearer married journalist and broadcaster Ludovic Kennedy. They were married in the Chapel Royal in London's Hampton Court Palace. She and Kennedy had a son and three daughters.

Shearer died at the Radcliffe Infirmary, Oxford, England, at the age of 80.

== Legacy ==
She has been portrayed by Shannon Davidson in the short film Òran na h-Eala (2022) which explores her life-changing decision to appear in The Red Shoes.

== Filmography ==
Year	Title	Role	Notes
1948	The Red Shoes	Victoria Page	
1951	The Tales of Hoffmann	Stella / Olympia	
1953	The Story of Three Loves	Paula Woodward	segment "The Jealous Lover"
1955	The Man Who Loved Redheads	Sylvia / Daphne / Olga / Colette	
1960	Peeping Tom	Vivian	
1961	Black Tights	Roxane	
1987	A Simple Man	Mother	made for television

== See also ==
- List of Eurovision Song Contest presenters

Preceded by (Republic of Ireland) Bernadette Ní Ghallchóir	Eurovision Song Contest presenter 1972	Succeeded by (Luxembourg) Helga Guitton
