= Harold Turner (dancer) =

English ballet dancer and teacher

- Born: 2 December 1909; Manchester, England
- Died: 2 July 1962 (aged 52); London, England
- Occupation: Ballet dancer
- Spouses: Mary Honer; Gerd Larsen

Harold Turner (2 December 1909 – 2 July 1962) was an English ballet dancer, teacher, and ballet master. Widely recognized as "modern British ballet's first male virtuoso," he had an illustrious career as a principal dancer, after which he continued to perform in character roles. He is acknowledged as a key figure in British dance history.

== Early life and training ==
Harold Turner was born in Manchester, in northwestern England. The son of Edward Harold Turner and Laura (Greenwood) Turner, he was raised in a cultured, musical household. His father was a viola player with the Hallé Orchestra, based in Manchester, and with the London Symphony Orchestra. His mother, who had interests in the performing arts, supported his decision to begin ballet training in 1925 at the relatively late age of 16. He studied first with Alfred Haines in Manchester. Blessed with a lithe, muscular physique and innate musicality, he quickly showed an aptitude for classical ballet. He made his professional debut with the Haines English Ballet while still a teenager. Then, encouraged by Léonide Massine, he moved to London and continued his studies with Marie Rambert at her school in Bedford Gardens.

== Career ==
Remarkably, Turner mastered classical ballet technique in very few years. He was invited to perform with a number of fledgling British ballet companies, becoming known for his virtuosity and exciting stage presence. He danced with Rambert's Ballet Club for several years, from 1928 to 1932. In 1930 the ballerina Tamara Karsavina joined Rambert's performing group as a guest artist and chose Turner, then only 20 years old, to partner her in Le Spectre de la Rose, a work originally choreographed for her and Vaslav Nijinsky by Michel Fokine. There was not much partnering to do, but the buoyant role of the Spirit of the Rose required exceptional elevation, ballon, and stamina.

In 1935, Turner joined the Vic-Wells Ballet, a predecessor of today's Royal Ballet, as a principal dancer. At the Old Vic and Sadler's Wells theatres, he danced major roles in productions of both classical and contemporary ballets, including the Bluebird in The Sleeping Beauty, Franz in Coppélia, Albrecht in Giselle, and Harlequin in Le Carnaval as well as in new works by Frederick Ashton and Ninette de Valois. Of the numerous roles he created during his five years with this company, the two most memorable are the Red Knight in Checkmate by de Valois and the Blue Boy in Les Patineurs (The Skaters) by Ashton. Both were created in 1937; both are principal male roles. The Red Knight is engaged in a dramatic, grim struggle of love and death with the Black Queen; the Blue Boy is a perky, lighthearted show-off performing dazzling tricks on a frozen pond. Turner excelled in each role. "It is arguable that he has never been surpassed, possibly never even equaled, in either of these very different creations. Certainly, at the time, no one else in the company could have tackled either one of them, and it was years before he was replaced in either role."

The Vic-Wells Ballet, which was based at the Sadler's Wells Theatre, was renamed Sadler's Wells Ballet in 1939. Turner remained with the company until 1951, with only two interruptions. In 1941-1942 he danced with Mona Inglesby's International Ballet, after which he served in the Royal Air Force during World War II. Upon returning to the Sadler's Wells Ballet in 1945, he shone in two works by Massine, La Boutique Fantasque (The Magic Toyshop) and Le Tricorne (The Three-Cornered Hat), in which he played the Miller, the role originated by Massine. With advancing age, he relinquished his bravura roles and transformed himself into an acclaimed character actor. Then, upon retirement, he taught at Sadler's Wells Ballet School, worked as ballet master of the Covent Garden Opera Ballet, and appeared occasionally as a guest artist with Sadler's Wells Ballet. Engaged to appear as the old Marquis di Luca in the 1962 revival of Massine's The Good-Humoured Ladies, he died of a heart attack on the way to his dressing room after a rehearsal at the Royal Opera House. He was 52 years old.

== Roles created ==
Turner created a remarkable number of roles in a remarkable variety of ballets. Among them are principal or soloist roles in the following works:

- 1928. Nymphs and Shepherds, choreography by Ashton; music by Wolfgang Amadeus Mozart. Role: principal dancer.
- 1930. Capriol Suite, choreography by Ashton; music by Peter Warlock. Role: principal dancer.
- 1930. Suite of Dances, choreography by de Valois; music by J.S. Bach, arranged by Eugene Goossens. Role: principal dancer.
- 1930. Le Rugby, choreography by Susan Salaman; music by Francis Poulenc. Role: rugby player.
- 1931. Cephalus and Procris, choreography by de Valois; music by André Grétry. Role: Cephalus.
- 1935. The Rake's Progress, choreography by de Valois; music by Gavin Gordon. Roles: The Dancing Master and The Gentleman with a Rope.
- 1935. Le Baiser de la Fée, choreography by Ashton; music by Igor Stravinsky. Role: The Young Man.
- 1936. Apparitions, choreography by Ashton; music by Franz Liszt, arranged by Constant Lambert. Role: The Hussar.
- 1937. Checkmate, choreography by de Valois; music by Arthur Bliss. Role: The Red Knight.
- 1937. Les Patineurs, choreography by Ashton, music by Giacomo Meyerbeer. Role: The Blue Boy.
- 1937. A Wedding Bouquet, choreography by Ashton; music by Lord Berners. Role: Paul.
- 1938. Le Roi Nu (The Emperor's New Clothes), choreography by de Valois; music by Jean Francaix. Role: Lover of the Empress.
- 1948. Clock Symphony, choreography by Massine; music by Franz Joseph Haydn. Role: principal dancer.
- 1950. Don Quixote, choreography by de Valois and Nicholas Sergeyev; music by Roberto Gerhard. Role: The Traveling Barber.

== Personal life ==
Turner was married twice: first to Mary Honer (1914-1965), a virtuoso dancer with the Vic-Wells Ballet who had originated the role of one of the Blue Girls in Les Patineurs, then to Gerd Larsen (1921-2001), a dancer, ballet mistress, and principal mime with the Royal Ballet. Turner and Larsen were married from 1944 until his death in 1962. They had one child together, a daughter, Solveig, in 1952.
