= Cleo Nordi =

Russian-Finnish ballerina (1898–1983)

- Born: Клео Норди; 28 January 1898; Kronstadt, Russia
- Died: 30 March 1983 (aged 85); London, England
- Citizenship: Russia; United Kingdom
- Education: Nikolai Legat; Lyubov Yegorova; Olga Preobrajenska
- Occupations: Ballerina; ballet master; choreographer
- Years active: 1914–1983
- Movement: Russian ballet

Cleo Nordi (Russian: Клео Норди, romanized: Kleo Nordi; 28 January [O.S. 16 January] 1898 – 30 March 1983) was a Russian-Finnish ballerina who danced as a soloist with Anna Pavlova's company before becoming a renowned teacher of the Russian ballet tradition in London. She was involved in three dance-related films.

== Biography ==
Nordi trained in Saint Petersburg with Nicolai Legat, with Lyubov Yegorova, Olga Preobrajenska and Vera Trefilova and in Helsinki with George Gé. On 13 December 1924, she made her Paris debut at the Théâtre Fémina in a light entertainment. The following year she became a member of the Paris Opera where she stayed until 1926. Later that year she joined Anna Pavlova's company with which she toured and danced solo roles until the latter's death in 1931.

Through her marriage to Walford Hyden, Pavlova's musical director and a light orchestra conductor, she was one of the first ballerinas screened on British television in 1934. She made dance arrangements for the musical theatre, sometimes herself appearing in productions and became involved in cinema. She had supporting roles in two films, in Cafe Colette (1937), Latin Quarter (1945) and was choreographer in the production of Caravan (1946). She travelled widely, including to Australia and Asia where she adopted the practice of Kundalini yoga.

After the Second World War, she settled in London where she held classes in West London and latterly in studios in Scarsdale Villas, and in Eldon Road, Kensington. She became an established and esteemed ballet teacher. Among her hundreds of pupils, notable ones include Rukmini Devi Arundale, Tamara Tchinarova, Roger Tully, Nadia Nerina, and Pina Bausch.

Cleo Nordi died in Fulham, aged 85 in 1983.

== Bibliography ==
- Davis, Janet Rowson. "Ballet on British Television, 1932-1935: A Supplement." Dance Chronicle, vol. 7, no. 3, 1984, pp. 294–325. JSTOR, www.jstor.org/stable/1567654. Nordi appeared dancing the Tarantella in an early UK television broadcast of ballet in 1934. Retrieved 02.02.2019

== See also ==
- List of Russian ballet dancers
