= Gerd Larsen =

Norwegian ballerina

- Born: Gerd Elly; 19 February 1921; Oslo, Norway
- Died: 4 October 2001 (aged 80); London, England
- Occupation: Ballerina
- Organizations: Royal Ballet
- Spouse: Harold Turner

Gerd Larsen born Gerd Elly (19 February 1921 – 4 October 2001) was a Norwegian ballerina who performed frequently with England's Royal Ballet, in a career lasting over fifty years up until her seventy-fifth birthday. In her later years, she was known for her mime roles.

== Early life ==
Gerd Elly was born in Oslo, Norway on 19 February 1921. Her father, Leonard, was a civil servant.

== Career ==
In the late 1930s, Elly came to London to study with Margaret Craske, and Antony Tudor, the first British ballet expert to recognise her skills. She joined Tudor's London Ballet in 1938, founded after he broke with Ballet Rambert. In 1938, Tudor created two roles for Larsen, Canonetta in Soirée Musicale and the French ballerina in Gala Performance.

Elly first danced with Sadler's Wells Ballet (now The Royal Ballet) in 1944. This was the same year that she married the ballet star Harold Turner becoming his second wife. Now, Gerd Larsen, she was later promoted to soloist in 1954. Sir Frederick Ashton noted her stage presence even in nearly static roles, casting her as Hera, in his 1951 Tiresias, and as Demeter is his 1961 Persephone. Back in 1960, Larsen had been selected by the Russian former prima ballerina Tamara Karsavina to be personally coached to play this mime role, for a revised staging of the ballet.

In 1965, Larsen created the role of Nurse in Kenneth MacMillan's Royal Ballet production of Romeo and Juliet to the music of Sergei Prokofiev. The ballerina Deborah Bull remembers Larsen as one of the "resident teachers" at the Royal Ballet. The others being Brian Shaw, Alexander Agadzhanov, and Elizabeth Anderton. Bull particularly admired Larsen's ability to introduce mime into the ballet.

Larsen was a widow with one child when she met the successful writer Rebecca West and her husband Henry Maxwell Andrews one evening, on a night Larsen had performed in Swan Lake. Henry became obsessed with Larsen and would refuse to travel with his wife; instead he stayed in London to be with Larsen. Rebecca West initially considered this to be purely her husband's infatuation, but came to think that Larsen was also driven by money. Henry was in his seventies; his life and marriage were ending (he died in 1968). Larsen and Henry's wife were amongst the mourners at the funeral, even though Larsen had only known him for eighteen months. Henry's will left £5,000 for Larsen.

In a Royal Ballet career lasting over fifty years, Larsen made her final appearance at Covent Garden in arguably her best-known role, that of Berthe, mother of the eponymous heroine in Giselle, on her seventy-fifth birthday.

== Personal life ==
Larsen was married to the British dancer Harold Turner from 1944 until his death in 1962. They had one child together, a daughter, Solveig, in 1952.

== Death ==
She died in London in her 81st year.
