= Enchanted Forest (disambiguation) =

An enchanted forest is a folklore motif or fantasy trope.

Enchanted Forest may also refer to:

== Arts and entertainment ==
- Enchanted Forest, English title for Ewiger Wald, a 1936 German film directed by Hanns Springer and Rolf von Sonjevski-Jamrowski
- The Enchanted Forest (1945 film), a family film
- The Enchanted Forest (1987 film), a Spanish comedy-fantasy film
- The Enchanted Forest (ballet), by Riccardo Drigo
- Enchanted Forest (game), a 1981 board game

== Theme parks ==
- Enchanted Forest (Indiana), a defunct theme park in Chesterton
- Enchanted Forest (Maryland), a defunct theme park in Ellicott City
- Enchanted Forest Water Safari, New York
- Enchanted Forest (Oregon), in Turner
- Enchanted Forest (Rhode Island), a defunct theme park in Hope Valley

== See also ==
- Enchanted Forest Chronicles, a series of four books by Patricia C. Wrede
- The Inchanted Forest, a 1754 work by Francesco Geminiani based on Jerusalem Delivered, an epic poem
