= Mona Inglesby =

British ballet dancer and choreographer

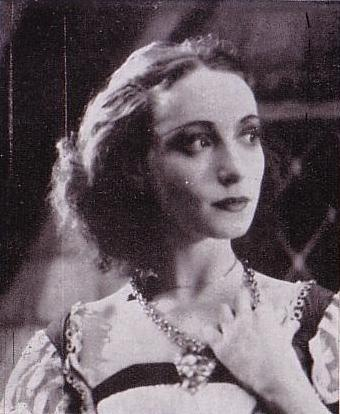
- Mona Inglesby as 'Giselle' on tour in 1943
- Born: Mona Vredenburg; 3 May 1918; London, UK
- Died: 6 October 2006 (aged 88); Bexhill-on-Sea, UK
- Occupations: Ballerina choreographer Director of International Ballet
- Spouse: Edwin Derrington 1946–1986 (his death)
- Children: Peter

Mona Inglesby (3 May 1918 – 6 October 2006), was a British ballet dancer, choreographer, director of the touring company International Ballet, and saved the Sergeyev Collection for posterity.

== Early life and training ==
Mona Inglesby was born in London of a British mother and a Dutch businessman father, Beatrix Anne Inglesby and Julius Cato Vredenburg. She started dancing very young, according to one of her early biographers, appearing on stage for the first time at age five at La Scala. At 12 was accepted into the school of Marie Rambert. This training was supplemented by lessons from Tamara Karsavina and Vera Volkova, both of whom had settled in London after fleeing Bolshevik Russia. She was soon appearing with the Ballet Club (which became Ballet Rambert in 1934) at the Mercury Theatre, Notting Hill Gate and at 15 she danced the part of Papillon in Mikhail Fokine's Carnaval, alongside actors Frederick Ashton as Pierrot, Harold Turner as Harlequin, Alicia Markova as Columbine and Antony Tudor as Eusebius. However she became dissatisfied with the Cecchetti method as taught by Rambert and took lessons in the traditional Maryinsky system from Lubov Egorova, Mathilde Kschessinska and Olga Preobrajenska in Paris and Nicholas Legat in London. This strained her relationship with Marie Rambert.

== Career as a dancer ==
Her association with Ballet Rambert ended when Egorova obtained for her an invitation to dance with de Basil's Original Ballet Russe company in its London season at the Royal Opera House, Covent Garden in 1939. Here she danced alongside the "baby ballerinas" Irina Baronova, Tamara Toumanova and Tatiana Riabouchinska, (Note: Mona Inglesby's recollection is that all three "baby ballerinas" were at Covent Garden in 1939. However in the documentary film Ballets Russes Baronova recalls that Toumanova joined Massine's rival company Ballet Russe de Monte Carlo in 1938 and that company was on tour in mainland Europe in the summer of 1939.) and gained experience of dancing with a company much larger than Ballet Rambert. At the end of that season she was invited to join the company for its Australian tour, but war was looming and she declined. She spent the rest of her dancing career as a principal dancer with International Ballet. The company's repertoire over its 12-year existence contained 22 ballets and Inglesby danced lead parts in most of them, including the classical roles of Giselle, Swanhilda in Coppelia, Aurora in Sleeping Beauty and Odette/Odile in Swan Lake. Ballet Today magazine described her as having 'some remarkable qualities as a dancer; she is exceptionally light, swift and aerial with strong, beautiful feet'.

== Career as a choreographer ==
It was while at the Rambert company that Inglesby developed her interest in choreography, inspired by a core group of fellow dancers who were becoming notable choreographers—Frederick Ashton, Andree Howard, Antony Tudor, Ninette de Valois and Walter Gore. Antony Tudor taught her choreography, and her chance came when at age 18 she was invited to create a ballet for the very short-lived venture Ballets de la Jeunesse Anglaise. The result was Endymion, a short ballet to music by Moskowski. She persuaded Constant Lambert to do some rearranging of the music and Sophie Fedorovitch to design the set and costumes. The single performance of Ballets de la Jeunesse Anglaise was a charity matinee at the Cambridge Theatre in 1938, and Endymion was well received. She later choreographed 4 more new ballets, listed below. All went into the repertoire of International Ballet after that company was formed.

Title	Music	Premiere	Date
Endymion	Moskowski	Cambridge Theatre	1938
Amoras	Elgar	Cambridge Theatre	Jan 1940
Planetomania	Norman Demuth	Theatre Royal, Birmingham	May 1941
Everyman	Richard Strauss	Lyric Theatre	July 1943
The Masque of Comus	Handel	Opera House, Blackpool	Apr 1946

Everyman was more than just a ballet. It was based on the late 15th-century English morality play Everyman and included verse, delivered by an actor rather than a dancer.
The Masque of Comus was both ambitious and courageous and required much historical research. The masque was a predecessor of ballet, an early form of entertainment involving music, dance, verse, singing and acting, and John Milton's Comus was a masque created for the Earl of Bridgewater at Ludlow Castle in 1634. The International Ballet production included all the elements of the original, with an acting cast as well as a ballet cast, and the first version lasted three hours, though it was later trimmed to two. The critics didn't know what to make of it!

== Career as Director of International Ballet ==
On the outbreak of war she volunteered to drive an ambulance, but continued with her ballet, and in February 1940 she opened a studio in borrowed premises in South Kensington at which she and like minded friends could practice. She soon decided a better use of her talents would be in presenting ballet to audiences in the now bombed cities of Britain and with a £5,000 loan from her father she formed the company Choreographic Productions Ltd, to perform under the name of International Ballet. She started with a small orchestra, but larger than Sadler's Wells could muster, and 21 dancers, with herself, the experienced Ballets Russes dancer Nina Tarakanova and the virtuoso star Harold Turner at the head. Among her initial artistes were the future Sadler's Wells Ballet and The Red Shoes star Moira Shearer, then 15, and the future choreographer Maurice Béjart. One of her main designers was Doris Zinkeisen Under her direction the International Ballet made its debut in the Alhambra Theatre Glasgow on 19 May 1941, with a full orchestra. It grew to be a very large company, bringing ballet to the masses in city theatres, cinemas, seaside holiday camps and military camps across Britain. The company continued to make extensive UK tours followed by 6 or 8-week London seasons on Shaftesbury Avenue. Company numbers rose to 80. Because of their large audiences they generated substantial income which supported their innovations and overseas tours.

Inglesby directed the company throughout its 12-year life, as well as dancing at its head. During this time, the company did not have a permanent theater in London but was obliged to book runs of a few weeks when West End theater schedules allowed. This handicap had the hidden benefit of obliging the company to tour outside London. As a result, International Ballet became recognised as Britain's largest classical touring company, doing much in the process to expand the British audience for dance. In 1951, when the Royal Festival Hall opened, International Ballet gave the inaugural performances, and from 1951 to 1953 it made tours of Switzerland, Italy and Spain.

By 1953 costs were rising, audiences were falling, and a request for grant assistance from the Arts Council was turned down. International Ballet could not compete with Alicia Markova and Anton Dolin's new touring Festival Ballet or the state-supported Sadler's Wells Ballet, by then heading the Royal Opera House at Covent Garden, and it had to cease operations in December 1953.

== The Sergeyev papers ==
In 1942 Inglesby hired the Russian emigree regisseur Nicholas Sergeyev to stage the company's first classical ballets using the notations he possessed of Marius Petipa's stagings at the Imperial Maryinsky Theatre, St Petersburg, before the Russian Revolution. Sergeyev had worked in Russia at the Maryinsky Theatre as chief balletmaster, where the presiding choreographer Marius Petipa appointed him to supervise a lengthy project to notate the choreography of Petipa's repertoire of ballets, which formed the core of the Imperial Russian ballet repertory. After the 1917 Russian Revolution, Sergeyev feared for the future of the ballet and left the country in 1918, taking the books of notations with him. After a period working with Sergei Diaghilev and the Ballets Russes he was invited by Ninette de Valois, who had been a dancer with the Ballets Russes, to come to London to stage classics for her young Vic-Wells Ballet company in the 1930s. However he became dissatisfied with de Valois's policy of editing his classical stagings and in 1946, after Sadler's Wells Ballet reopened the Royal Opera House after the war with a new Sleeping Beauty staging, he moved full-time to International Ballet, where Inglesby had pledged to stage the imperial classics untouched. Sergeyev agreed on condition that Inglesby herself dance as leading ballerina.

When Sergeyev died in 1951, he left the notations to a Russian friend, but he had no interest and Inglesby bought them. When International Ballet closed she retained the papers, hoping to find a permanent home for them. After drawing a blank in England, she approached the well-known London theatre memorabilia dealer and dance historian Ifan Kyrle Fletcher. He frequently dealt with American collectors and in 1967 arranged the sale to the Harvard Theatre Collection at Harvard University of the Swan Lake notation from Sergeyev's collection. In 1969 Inglesby sold the remaining papers to Harvard, where they are known as the Sergeyev Collection.

== Personal life ==
On tour in Swansea in late 1944 she met Captain (later Major) Edwin Derrington, known as Derry. They married in 1946. Soon after the marriage Derry took the post of Administrator in International Ballet. He instituted the education programme, consisting of lectures, workshops and special school performances.

They had one son, Peter.

== Later life and death ==
After she closed International Ballet at the end of 1953, Inglesby retired with her husband to a cottage in Robertsbridge, Sussex. In 2000 Sergei Vikharev, a choreographer and dancer at the Maryinsky ballet, visited her there to acknowledge the part she had played in preserving the Sergeyev notations of the Maryinsky's core 19th-century classical repertoire for posterity. The Maryinsky (known as the Kirov Ballet in and for a short time after Soviet times) had used them to reconstruct the original Petipa choreography for their 1999 production of Sleeping Beauty, which the company brought to London in 2000.

Derry died in 1986. Inglesby died at Bexhill-on-Sea on 6 October 2006 aged 88. She was survived by her son.

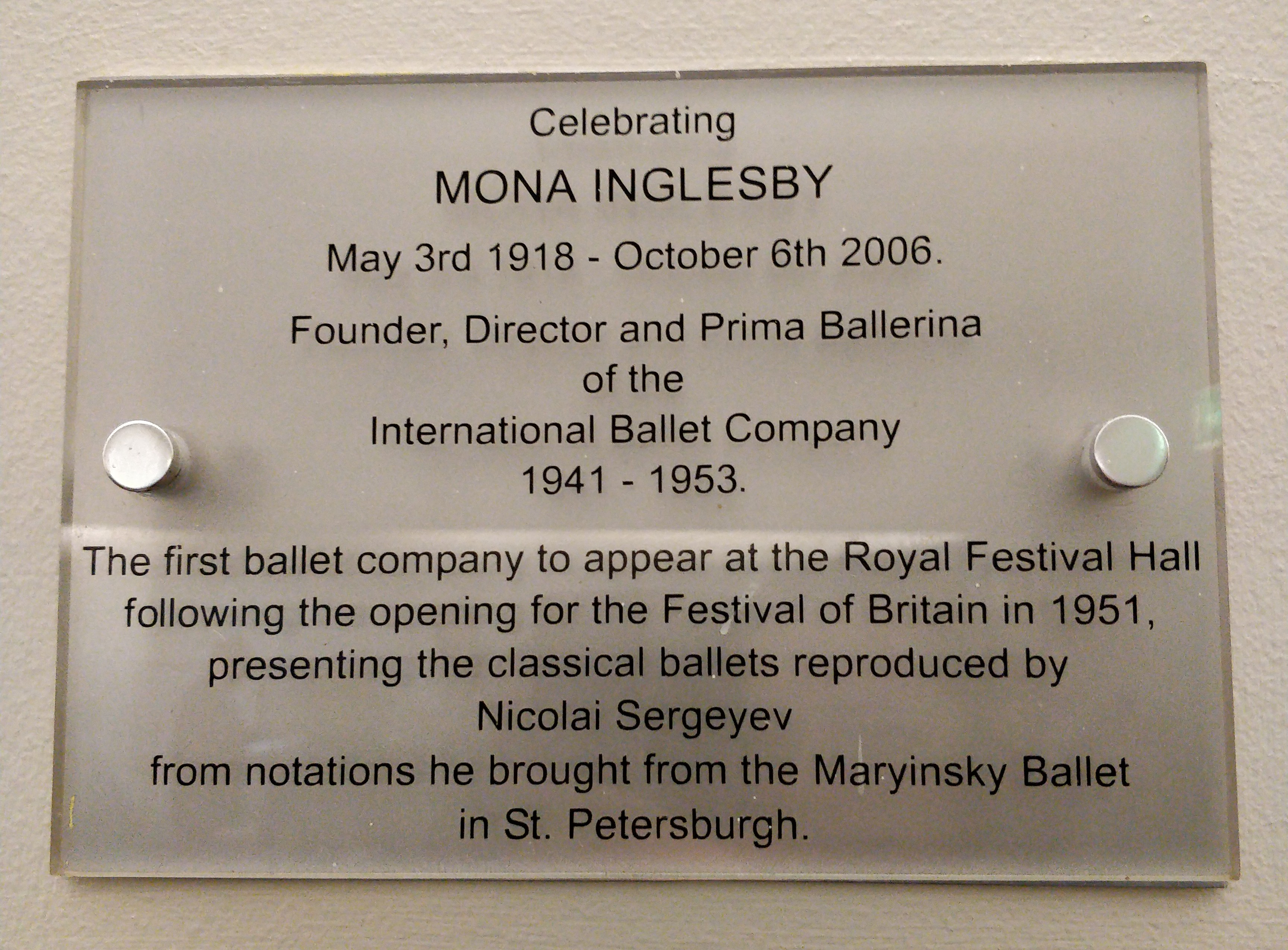
plaque at the Royal Festival Hall

She received no honours during her lifetime, but in 2012 a plaque was put up inside the artists' entrance of the Royal Festival Hall commemorating her achievements and those of International Ballet, as the company which had inaugurated the Festival Hall's opening season of 1951. A BBC Radio 4 documentary Black-Out Ballet, including interviews with Henry Danton and other surviving International Ballet dancers, was broadcast in November 2012.

== Notes and references ==
Notes
