= Alhambra Theatre Glasgow =

Former theatre in Glasgow, Scotland

Alhambra Theatre
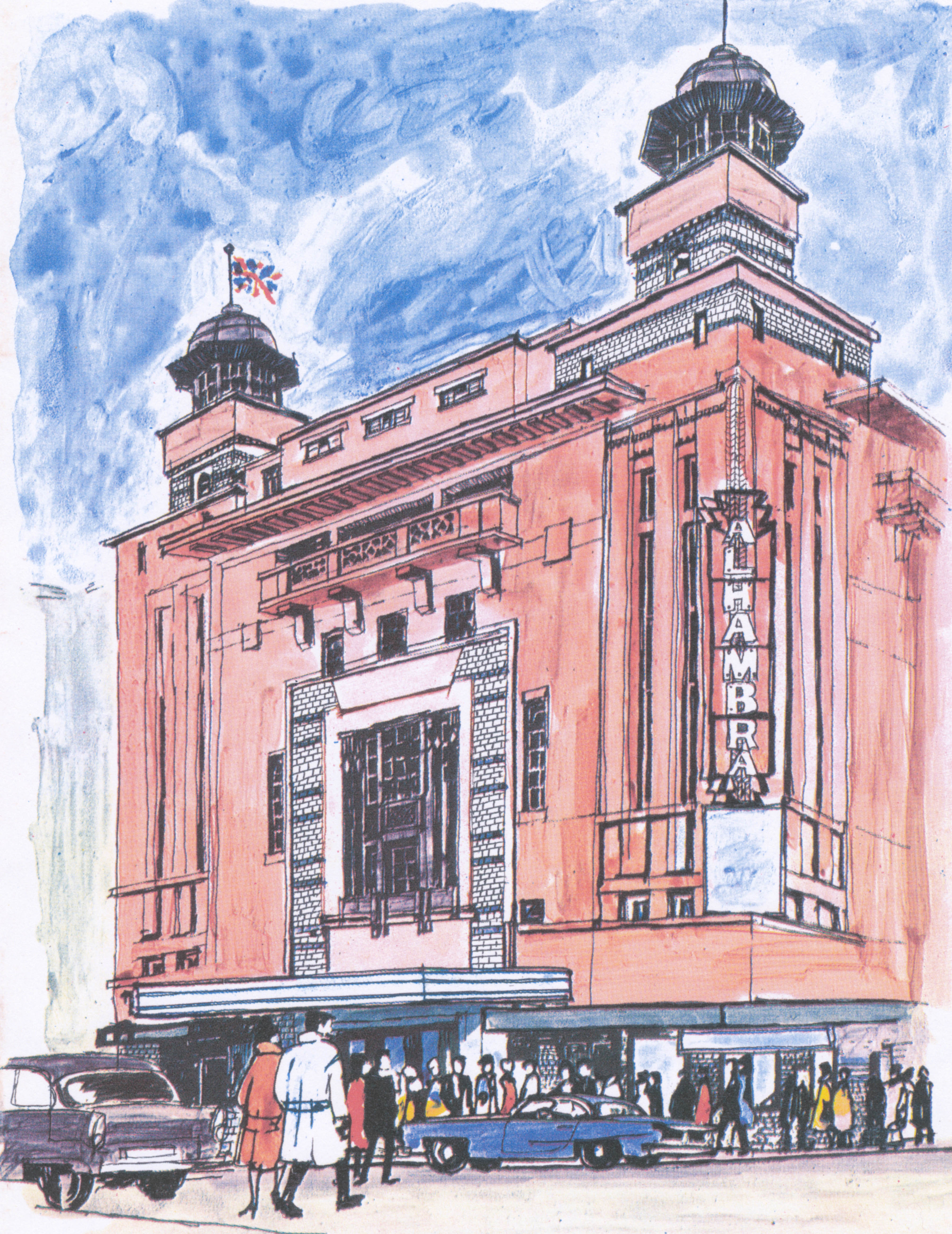
- Alhambra Theatre Glasgow programme cover 1960s
- Interactive map of Alhambra Theatre
- Address: Waterloo Street; Glasgow; Scotland
- Coordinates: 55°51′37″N 4°15′35″W
- Owner: Glasgow Alhambra Ltd (1910-1953); Howard & Wyndham Ltd (1953-1969)
- Capacity: 2,800
- Type: Proscenium

Construction
- Opened: 19 December 1910
- Closed: May 24, 1969
- Demolished: 1971
- Years active: 1910–1969
- Architect: John James Burnet

1922 Alhambra Theatre Playbill

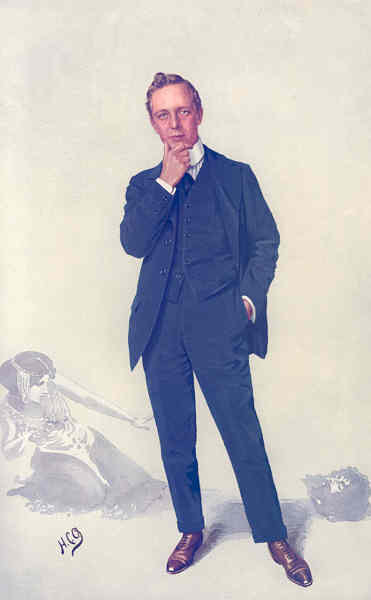
Alfred Butt, founder of the Alhambra Theatre, Glasgow

The Alhambra is a former theatre in Glasgow, Scotland. It was located at the corner of Waterloo Street and Wellington Street and planned to accommodate 2,800 people. It was a venue that hosted popular variety and comedy performances. It closed in 1969 and the building was demolished in 1971.

== History ==
The Alhambra opened on 19 December 1910 at the corner of Waterloo Street and Wellington Street, Glasgow under the direction of Sir Alfred Butt and was acknowledged as one of the best equipped theatres in Britain, planned to accommodate 2,800 people.

The theatre was designed by architect, Sir John James Burnet. It was built on the site of the popular Waterloo Rooms, which had previously been Wellington Street Church. The name derives from association with the Moorish palace in Granada, and was styled in "a cubic design with a colonnade of deep eaves, topped with twin oriental domes. Its exterior was red brick banded with black and panels of white-glazed tile towards the top. Inside were canopies with sparing Louis XVI decoration.".

It was always regarded as a modern theatre and one of the No 1 theatres, known also as A1 theatres, of which by the 1960s there were only 14 remaining in Britain. Throughout most of its life the theatre was owned by Glasgow Alhambra Ltd. In the 1920s it formed an association with Moss Empires who bought 20% of the company shareholding.

The Alhambra opened with Yvonne Guilbert from France and specialised in variety, including artistes from America, Australia and Continental Europe. Pantomimes began, using the Wylie-Tate production company. Scottish performers included Harry Lauder, Will Fyffe, Alec Finlay and Harry Gordon; revues and musical plays were added, featuring Cicely Courtneidge, Jack Buchanan, Evelyn Laye, Jessie Matthews and Ivor Novello; and also opera, ballet and dance. In 1941 it was the debut theatre of the International Ballet newly formed by Mona Inglesby.

The Alhambra presented variety, ballet, opera, musicals, revues, plays and pantomime; significantly after a major extension in 1927 of the stage and increase in dressing rooms, all with showers, many of its musicals were the British premieres of musicals from America.

From 1941, the new Wilson Barrett Repertory Company, not the 19c company, made the Alhambra their largest base in Scotland. In its 14 years of staging plays over 12 weeks each summer, the company produced over 450 plays.

The theatre became a part of the Howard & Wyndham Ltd theatre company, in 1953, which purchased the theatre after selling its Theatre Royal, to Roy Thomson, founder of Scottish Television. The theatre had a revolving stage, and from 1961 the stage was doubled in size to become the Starlight Room for the summer season Five Past Eight shows.

Shows now included the fabulous Half Past Eight summer shows, later named Five-Past Eight produced by Dick Hurran and the Wish for Jamie pantomimes produced by Freddie Carpenter. These shows included: Rikki Fulton, Jimmy Logan, Stanley Baxter, Fay Lenore, Eve Boswell, Kenneth McKellar, David Hughes, Max Bygraves and Frankie Vaughan. The Bluebell Girls of Paris, based at Le Lido, made their debut in Britain, over two summers, at the Alhambra in 1962 and 1963.

The theatre had the distinction of staging Scotland's first Royal Variety Performance on 3 July 1958 attended by Queen Elizabeth and the Duke of Edinburgh, and the second in 1963. Likewise the Scottish première of My Fair Lady in May 1964. Glasgow Scouts performed their first Gang Show here in 1936; in November 1947, Mae West arrived in the city to perform her self-penned play Diamond Lil at the Alhambra Theatre; and Marlene Dietrich performed her Farewell at the Alhambra from 7-11 November 1966.

The theatre continued to be well attended but the company were selling off their theatres, and after the final show by Cilla Black on 24 May 1969, the theatre closed. It was demolished in 1971. The site is now occupied by an office block, Alhambra House.
