= Kathleen Crofton =

English dancer, director, and dance teacher

- Born: 23 December 1902; Faizabad, United Provinces of Agra and Oudh, British India (present-day Uttar Pradesh, India)
- Died: 30 November 1979 (aged 76); Rochester, New York, United States
- Occupations: dancer, choreographer, ballet director
- Dancing career
- Former groups: Niagara Frontier Ballet, Festival Ballet of New York, Maryland Ballet Company

Kathleen Crofton (23 December 1902 – 30 November 1979) was an English dancer, dance director and dance teacher. She was founder of the Niagara Frontier Ballet and the Ballet Center of Buffalo.

== Life and career ==
Kathleen Crofton was born in Faizabad, India, in 1902, to British parents. Her father had been an Army Officer who was killed in action. Crofton studied ballet under Russian dancers Olga Preobrajenska, Nikolai Legat, and Laurent Novikoff. She would go on to dance with Anna Pavlova's company between 1923 and 1928, earning the nickname "Pavlova's Baby" due to her age. Crofton then danced with the Chicago Lyric Opera Ballet before touring Europe with Bronislava Nijinska's company. She also danced with the Levitov-Dandré Russian Ballet and the Markova-Dolin Ballet. Crofton retired from dancing in 1938 and gave up performing during World War II in order to contribute to the war effort.

After returning to ballet in 1950, Crofton opened her own studio in London and was often a guest at the Royal Ballet School. In 1966, she relocated to New York City when Alicia Markova, the ballet director of the Metropolitan Opera, invited her to teach. Shortly after, in 1967, Crofton relocated to Buffalo, NY, where she established a ballet company, the Niagara Frontier Ballet, and feeder school, the Ballet Center of Buffalo, upon the recommendation of Markova. Here, she would continue to train dancers in the Imperial Russian style. In 1969, she convinced her friend Nijinska to produce three classical ballets in Buffalo and in 1971, the Niagara Frontier Ballet toured Europe with Rudolf Nureyev.

Following the tour, Crofton's company and school was suspended due to financial uncertainty from their original funding body, the Metropolitan Buffalo Association for The Dance. They were bailed out by the Great Lakes Association for the Dance and in 1972 the company was re-organized as the Festival Ballet of New York.

Although the new Festival Ballet of New York was met with mounting success, in April 1973, a fire in the company's studio destroyed sets, costumes, and musical scores, and ultimately led to the disbanding of the company. Crofton left Buffalo to teach at the San Francisco Ballet, and then to serve as the artistic director of the Maryland Ballet Company, but returned to Rochester, NY in 1978 to establish a classical company, Ballet Concordia. Before the company could get off the ground, however, Cofton suffered a heart attack at her desk in Rochester, and died on 30 November 1979.

=== Notable students ===
- Roger Tully
- Belinda Wright
