= Anneliese von Oettingen =

Ballerina and choreographer (1917–2002)

- Born: 22 January 1917; Berlin, Germany
- Died: 9 December 2002 (aged 85); Clearwater, Florida, U.S.
- Occupations: Ballet teacher; choreographer

Anneliese Helene Charlotte von Oettingen (22 January 1917 – 9 December 2002) was a ballerina and influential ballet teacher and choreographer. After training in Berlin and London, she taught in Berlin during World War II. After the war she moved to Cincinnati, where she taught ballet and modern dance, and helped found the Cincinnati Civic Ballet. She was featured in Sports Illustrated, and received the keys to the city of Cincinnati.

== Early life ==
Born in Berlin in 1917, von Oettingen was four years old when she began dance lessons. She originally trained in the Russian ballet method under the instruction of Eugenie Edvardova in Berlin. At age 16 she was directing and teaching at her own school of ballet in Berlin and was later licensed by the German state to train professional dancers. Von Oettingen later trained under Nikolai Legat and Nadine Nicolaeva-Legat in London. She performed as a solo ballerina and choreographed for the Potsdam Opera.

Von Oettingen was teaching ballet in Berlin during World War II. She described teaching during the bombing: "We had ballet dancing during the day. Air raids would sound and we would run to the basement. Once the all-clear sound came, we had to go back to the studio and pretend nothing had happened." She left Berlin for the United States without her husband, Friedrich-Karl Sass, who was declared missing in action. Von Oettingen spent the rest of her life as a widow, never remarrying.

== In the United States ==
In 1947, she emigrated to Cincinnati, Ohio with her two children Cornelia and Tyll, then aged four and six, where she became a well-known ballet teacher. She opened her first ballet school in Cincinnati a year later in 1948. In addition to teaching at her own school, she also taught ballet and modern dance at Our Lady of Cincinnati College (later Edgecliff College) for 14 years, and at Moss Lake Camp for girls for 23 years.

In 1962 von Oettingen was one of seven ballet teachers in the Cincinnati area who came together to form the Cincinnati Civic Ballet, now known today as the Cincinnati Ballet Company. She played a key role in recommending Oleg Sabline for new leadership at the College-Conservatory of Music. In 1973, she opened her Adirondack ballet camp at Eagle Bay (Fourth Lake), New York. The camp operated until 2001, one year before her death in Clearwater, Florida in 2002 at the age of 85.

== Recognition ==
In 1977 von Oettingen was featured in Sports Illustrated for her work with professional football players. Football players Brad Cousino and Ken Avery attended the Anneliese von Oettingen School of Ballet in Cincinnati for rehabilitation after sustaining injuries. Cousino also trained at von Oettingen's ballet camp at Eagle Bay, New York.

In 1989, von Oettingen received the keys to the city of Cincinnati in recognition of her accomplishments and her first ballet studio in Cincinnati was recognized as a "Cincinnati First" with a bicentennial plaque. Later, in 1998, Ohio Governor Bob Taft honored her with the governor's award.
