= Bernadette Ní Ghallchóir =

Irish television presenter

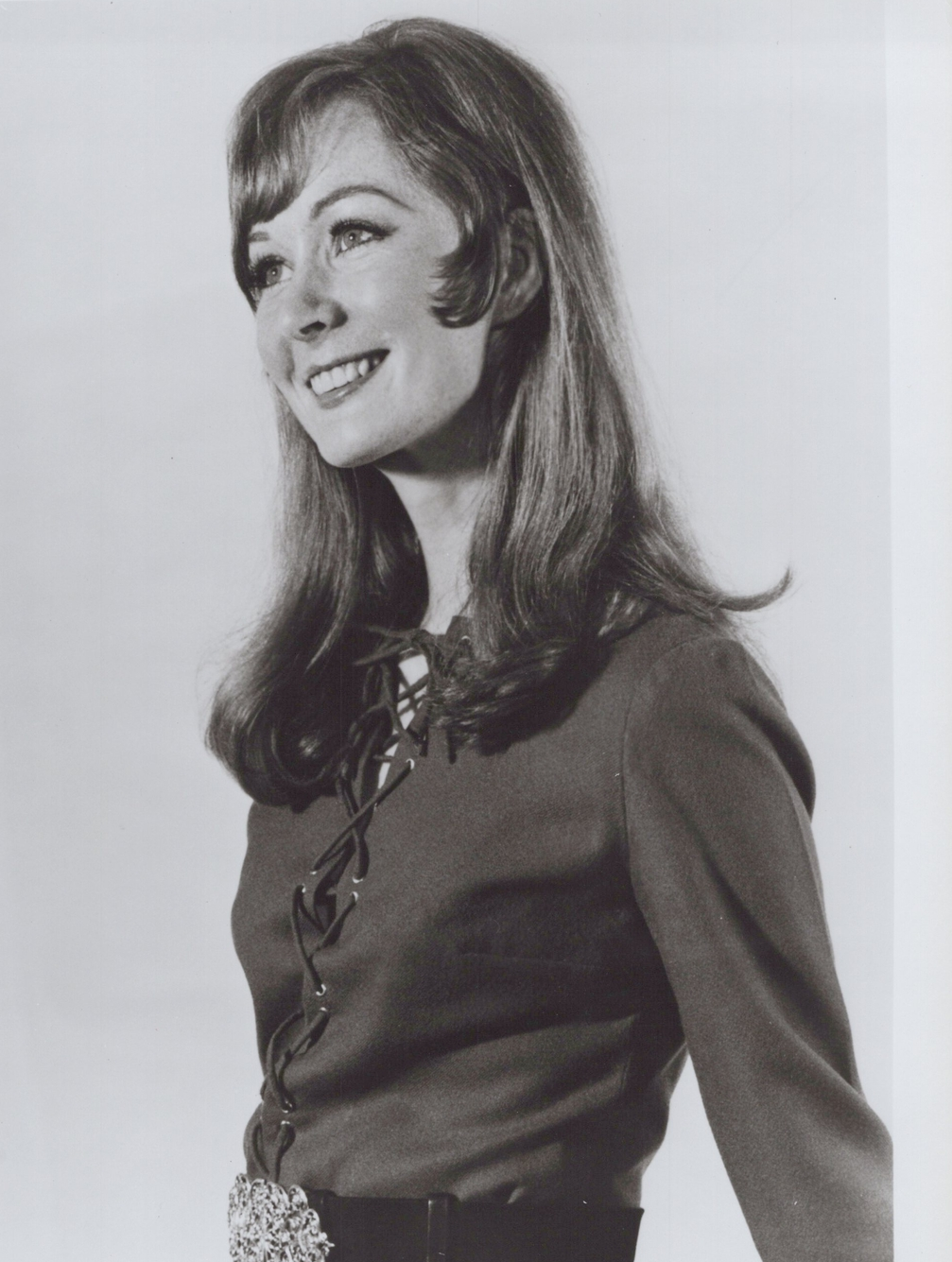
- Born: 1947 or 1948 (age 77–78); Monaghan, Ireland
- Education: University College Galway; University of London
- Occupations: Television presenter, continuity announcer
- Employer: Raidió Teilifís Éireann
- Known for: Presenting the Eurovision Song Contest in 1971
- Spouse: Sean O hUiginn

Bernadette Ní Ghallchóir (Irish pronunciation: [n̠ʲiː ˈɣal̪ˠəxoːɾʲ]; born 1947 or 1948) is an Irish television presenter and continuity announcer. She was a familiar face of RTÉ between the late sixties and early eighties. She is probably best remembered for hosting the 1971 Eurovision Song Contest from the Gaiety Theatre in Dublin, she continued to be involved with Eurovision when in 1973 she hosted National Song Contest.

== Career ==
In the late 1960s, Ní Ghallchóir (using the name Bernadette Gallagher) worked briefly as a primary school teacher in London, teaching at the George Tomlinson School in Leytonstone.

Ní Ghallchóir hosted the Irish language show Buntús Cainte in the 1960s. She is probably best remembered for hosting the 1971 Eurovision Song Contest from the Gaiety Theatre in Dublin, she continued to be involved with Eurovision when in 1973 she hosted National Song Contest.

When RTÉ Two was launched in 1978, Ní Ghallchóir was one of the first presenters who officially opened the channel with Raymond Maxwell and Roisin Harkin. She presented Trachtaireacht ("commentary") on RTÉ at that time.

In the 1980s, she retired from television and began a career as a sculptor. She is married to Seán Ó hUigínn, the former Ambassador of Ireland to the United States.

== See also ==
- List of Eurovision Song Contest presenters

| Preceded by (Netherlands) Willy Dobbe | Eurovision Song Contest presenter 1971 | Succeeded by (United Kingdom) Moira Shearer |
