= International Ballet =

General information
- Name: International Ballet
- Year founded: May 1941
- Closed: 5 December 1953
- Founder: Mona Inglesby

Senior staff
- Director: Mona Inglesby
- Company manager: Guy Charles, Miss E. Fleetwood, Dorothy Brown

Artistic staff
- Ballet Master in Chief: Stanislas Idzikowski
- Ballet Master: Nicholas Sergeyev, Geoffrey Espinosa, Ernest Hewitt
- Music Director: George Weldon, Ernest Irving, James Walker, Anthony Baines

International Ballet was a British ballet company that operated, with great success, between 1941 and 1953. Its director throughout its existence was Mona Inglesby, who was also its principal ballerina. Although it was Britain's largest ballet company during the war years, and performed to an audience of between one and two million in wartime Britain and between ten and twenty million in its twelve-year life, (Note: Calculated from the published figures of 20,000 for one week in Stockton in 1942/3, 1,000 performances between May 41 and Feb 45, 36,000 for one week in Kilburn in 1947, 2,000,000 per year from 1947, long summer season at the RFH (2,500 seats) sold out, 42,000 for 9 performances in Zurich 1951, 32,000 per night in Verona 1952, 220,000 for summer tour 1953) its contribution to the growth of British ballet has been largely overshadowed by that of the other four ballet companies that were operating in 1953. All are state subsidised, and are still operating: Sadler's Wells Ballet (now the Royal Ballet), Ballet Rambert (now the Rambert Dance Company), Sadler's Wells Theatre Ballet now (Birmingham Royal Ballet), and the newly formed Festival Ballet (now English National Ballet).

International Ballet is probably unique amongst large ballet companies in that it paid its way without any private or state grant aid. Staging ballet has always been expensive, and Arts Council funding for the year 2013-2014 for those other three companies was Rambert £2M, English National Ballet £6M and the Royal Ballet well over £10M.

== Formation ==
International Ballet was formed by the 22-year-old dancer and choreographer Mona Inglesby. On the outbreak of war she had volunteered to drive an ambulance, but she soon decided her talents would be better used taking ballet to audiences in the bomb damaged cities of Britain. With a £5,000 loan from her father she formed the company Choreographic Productions Ltd, to perform under the name of International Ballet. It had a Council of Management chaired by Baroness Ravensdale, and as a "cultural organisation not operated for profit" it was exempt from entertainment tax. Inglesby engaged dancers, a small orchestra and the experienced retired dancer Stanislas Idzikowski as ballet master, and she commissioned sets and costumes. By May 1941 the new company was ready to launch.

== The war years ==
The first tour started at the Alhambra Theatre Glasgow on 19 May 1941 with 22 artistes and a full orchestra, consisting of a permanent nucleus of 15 augmented by local musicians. The soloists were Inglesby herself, the experienced ballerina Nina Tarakanova and the virtuoso star Harold Turner, and the corps included the 15-year-old Moira Shearer. The repertoire contained 8 one-act ballets, listed below. The tour was followed by an 8-week season at the Lyric Theatre, Shaftesbury Avenue, London.

After this successful beginning the company embarked on a punishing schedule of two national tours per year, with 1 week or 2 week bookings at each venue and 3 matinees and 5 evening performances per week. Each tour was followed by a West End season of 6 or 8 weeks. Performances always had a full orchestra. It grew to be a very large company, bringing ballet to the masses in city theatres, cinemas, seaside holiday camps and military camps across Britain. The company continued to make extensive UK tours followed by 6 or 8-week London seasons on Shaftesbury Avenue. Because of their large audiences they generated substantial income which supported their innovations and overseas tours. As time went on more even ambitious ballets were added to the repertoire and the company was enlarged, reaching 80 in number. The company's main scenic artist and costume designer was Doris Zinkeisen.

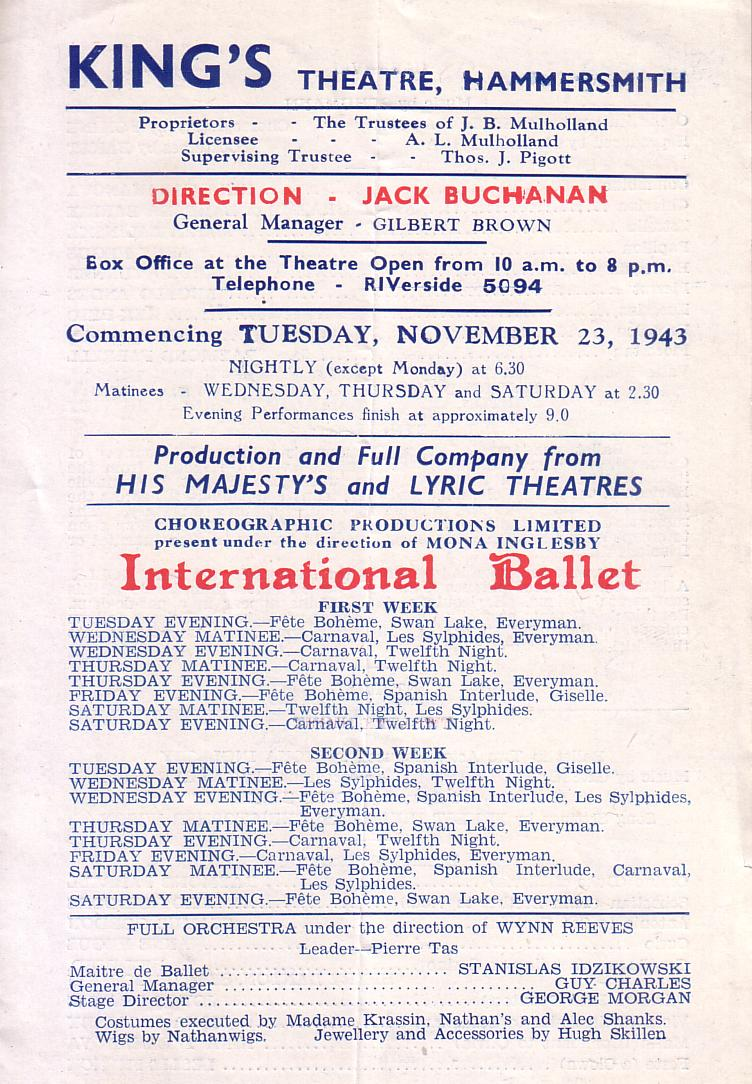
King's Theatre Hammersmith 1943

This programme from the King's Theatre, Hammersmith for November 1943 is typical of a fortnight on tour. 16 performances, each of 2 or 3 ballets selected from a repertoire of 8, with only the three heavily over-worked principal dancers. This rate of working went on throughout the war, and February 1945 saw the company's 1000th performance.

Soon after forming the company Inglesby invited the 65-year-old Nicholas Sergeyev, then ballet master at Sadler's Wells Ballet, to stage some of the classical ballets for International Ballet. Sergeyev had been regisseur of the Imperial Russian Ballet for the last 15 years of its existence, where he had supervised a project under the leading choreographer Marius Petipa to notate all the ballets in the imperial repertoire. After the 1917 Russian Revolution he left Russia, taking the notations with him (main article: the Sergeyev Collection). He worked with Sergei Diaghilev and the Ballets Russes and then came to England at the invitation of Ninette de Valois to join the young Sadler's Wells Ballet in London and stage the first English productions of the Russian classical ballets. However, during the war International Ballet was the only company with the resources to stage full productions of these ballets, and Inglesby determined to put on productions exactly as Sergeyev dictated, reproducing the choreography and style of the Imperial Russian Ballet. Sergeyev respected her efforts so much that he left Sadler's Wells to join her full-time as ballet master, staying with her until he died in 1951. International Ballet became known as the vessel for classical productions in the grand Imperial Russian style.

This photograph of the lakeside scene of Swan Lake, variously called Act 2 or Act 1 Scene 2, is from a theatre programme of the second tour of 1943. The corps de ballet has only 12 members because of the small size of some of the stages used on tours. Large theatre stages will accommodate 24 or even 32.

In 1943 the company opened the International School of Ballet in Queensberry Mews, South Kensington. It was under the direction of Sergeyev himself, because he no longer went on the tours (he was then 67). A small number of scholarships were made available to male dancers too young for military call-up who would otherwise need to earn a living. Many graduates of the school went on to join the company, which continually needed fresh talent as it increased its numbers.

== Post-war expansion ==
The company was further expanded after the war, to enable the mounting of the very large productions The Masque of Comus, Sleeping Princess and Swan Lake. The end of the war meant that male dancers were back from armed service and artistes could more easily be recruited from abroad. By the 1948 the London West End season which included Sleeping Princess the company had 135 members, including artistes, musicians and staff, and artistes alone numbered 100 for the 1949 seasons.

When Edwin Derrington, Inglesby's husband, joined the company as Administrator in 1946 he instituted an educational programme. Special schools matinees were given, preceded by talks about the ballet and behind-the-scenes tours. Derrington also lectured to Rotary and W.I. and other local groups.

In 1950 the company received a boost with the arrival of Léonide Massine, the brilliant and very experienced choreographer and former dancer, though probably better known now for his role in the film The Red Shoes. He rehearsed and produced the ballets Capriccio Espagnole and Gaiete Parisienne that he had created 15 years earlier for the Ballet Russe de Monte-Carlo. Both appeared in the repertoire in 1951.

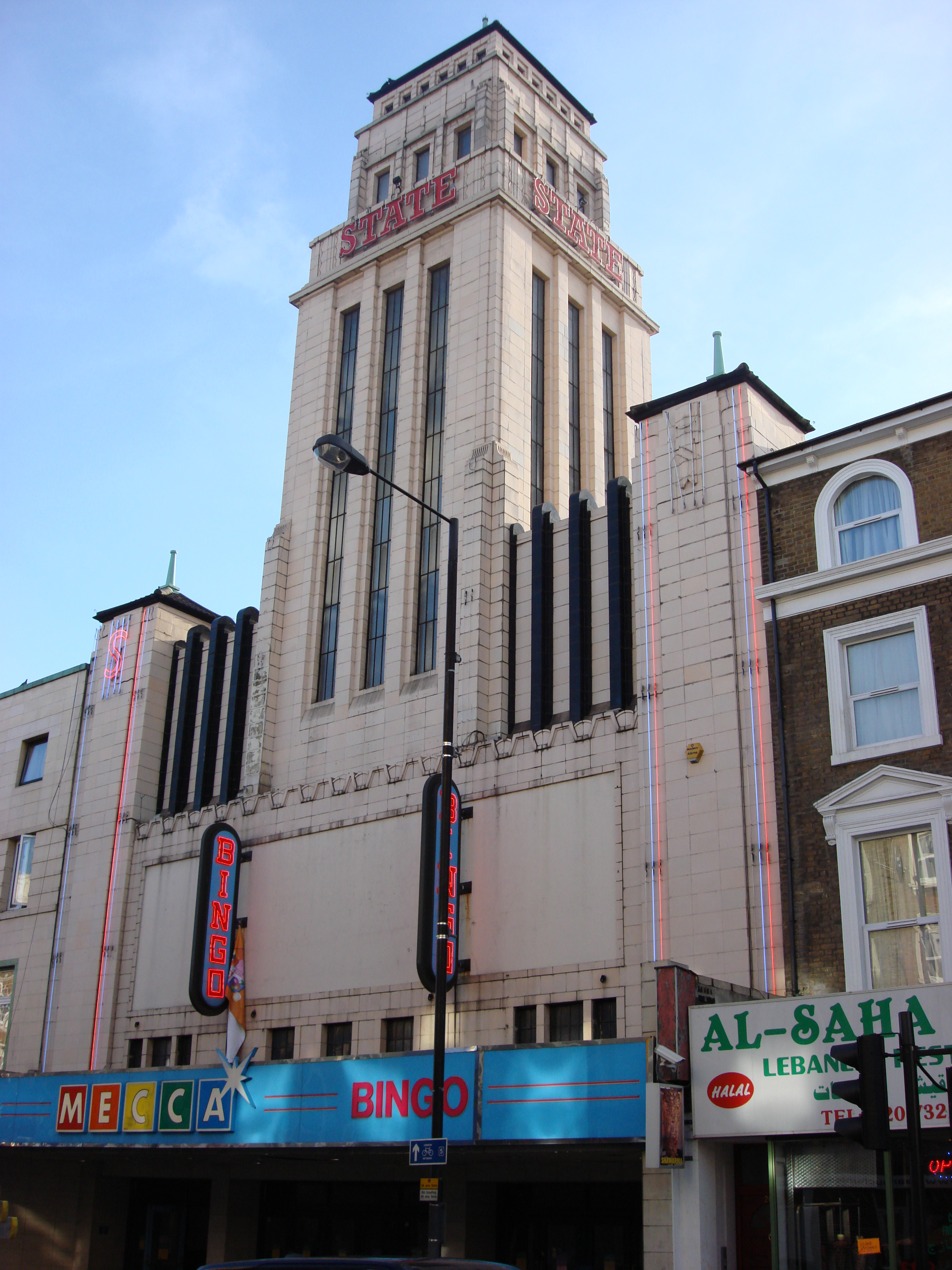
The Gaumont State Cinema, Kilburn

To pay for the post-war expansion of the company and the large and expensive new productions International Ballet had to find larger audiences. The summer tour of 1947 took in three Butlin's holiday camps and from December 1946 onwards several of the Rank Organisation cinemas were included in the tours. These had huge seating capacities and when they were built they had been equipped with large stages. The largest, the Gaumont State Cinema in Kilburn, seated 4,004, and when the company played there for a week they played to full houses. The conventional theatres were still used however (e.g.), and Kay Hunter's book lists 48 provincial and 11 West End theatres where the company appeared during its 12 years of operation.

Just one of those theatres was the recently rebuilt Theatre Royal in Hanley., where in November 1952 the company preceded a performance of Coppelia by a 'schools day'. 1600 youngsters sat in on a practice session, parts of a rehearsal, and part of the third act in full costume. (Note: Reported in the Staffordshire Evening Sentinel and reprinted at.) International Ballet's memories of Hanley will have been happier than those of their competitor. During the Sadler's Wells visit in June 1949 the theatre burnt down and destroyed their scenery, costumes and entire collection of musical instruments.
This theatre is now a theme bar and night club.

== The Festival of Britain 1951 ==
1951 was the year of the Festival of Britain and the opening of the newly built Royal Festival Hall on the South Bank, London, and International Ballet was the only company invited to present a programme of ballet for its inaugural season. The Festival Hall is principally a concert hall and has no proscenium arch or stage curtains. Temporary ones could have been erected, but International Ballet decided to present their ballets without them. Special lighting had to be devised, and new sets designed to complement the unusual lighting. The varied programme included the two Massine ballets and the Russian classical ballets, but they had to be adapted somewhat to suit the new stage arrangement. This novel presentation of ballet attracted criticism from some quarters, but all performances of the long summer season were sold out.
The company was invited to do another season the following year but could not accept because of prior commitments overseas. However it had shown that ballet could be successful staged this way, and some time later the Festival Ballet made the Royal Festival Hall their London base.

== European tours 1951 to 1953 ==
The last three chapters of Inglesby and Hunter's book are devoted to the European tours and contain a wealth of anecdotal detail as well as the information given here. The company launched itself onto mainland Europe in 1951 with a short season at the Hallenstadion, an indoor stadium in Zurich. A total audience of 42,000 attended the nine performances which more than paid for the considerable expense involved.

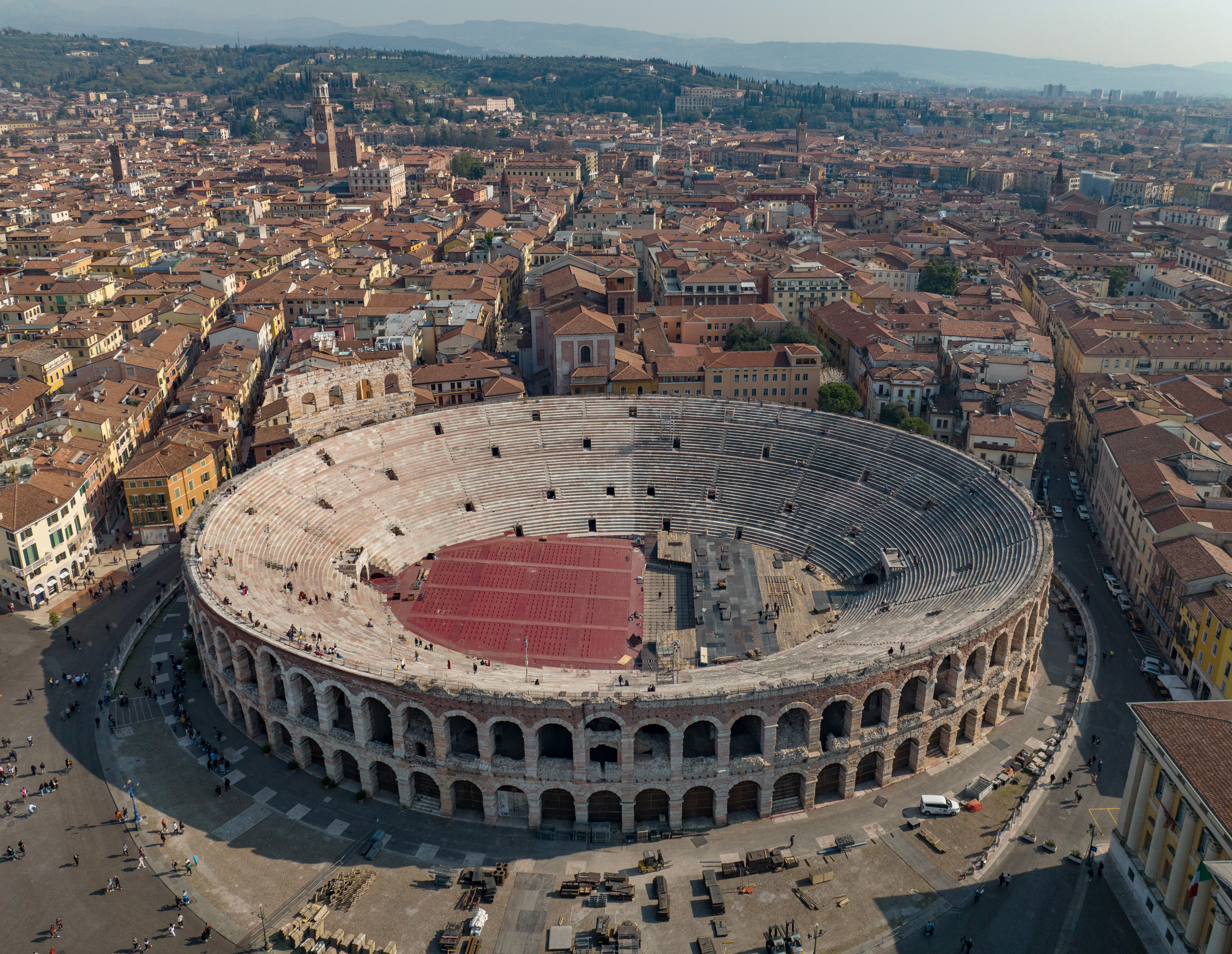
The Roman Arena di Verona

Inside the Arena di Verona

The following summer saw the company at the Arena di Verona, a 2,000-year-old Roman amphitheatre in northern Italy. Open to the sky, the audience of up to 30,000 sat on cushions on the stone tiers and on rows of seats on the arena floor where originally the gladiators battled and the lions ate the Christians. Some dressing rooms were in the lions' dens and some in the Christians' prison cells underneath the tiered stone seating. Performances started very late, after it got dark, but ballet nights alternated with opera nights so the artistes had a day to recover.
The 1953 tour took in the opera houses of Palermo, Reggio Emilia, Brescia, Trieste, Turin and Sanremo before moving to Spain for a four-week season at the Gran Teatro del Liceu in Barcelona. The audiences of this tour of Italy and Spain totalled 220,000.

== The end of the company ==
The expanded company had become very expensive to run, and whilst the European tours had played to full houses, audiences on the UK tours were now dwindling. This was general in the theatre and film world in the mid 50s, and was due at least in part to the rapid spread of television. Britain now had three other ballet companies: Sadler's Wells Ballet and Ballet Rambert established 20 years earlier, and the new touring company Festival Ballet founded in 1950 by Alicia Markova and Anton Dolin. Festival Ballet had more star power, and International Ballet missed its guiding ballet master Sergeyev who had died in 1951.

The company did one more UK tour after Barcelona, but gave its last performance on 5 December 1953. The artists dispersed to find other posts where they could and Mona Inglesby went into retirement. Ballet Annual published an "obituary" to the company in its 1955 edition.

Many of the set and costume designs are now preserved in the Theatre Collection of Harvard University Library, as is the Sergeyev Collection.

In 2012 a plaque was put up inside the artists’ entrance of the Royal Festival Hall commemorating the achievements of International Ballet and its founder and Director, Mona Inglesby.

== Reception ==
Audiences loved International Ballet. Until the 50s the company played to full houses, sometimes in very large venues. (Note: With home theatres in London, neither Sadler's Wells nor Ballet Rambert toured as extensively as International Ballet, and during the war no company could visit Britain from abroad. International Ballet was the only company many towns saw.)
The response of professional ballet critics was predictable and unsurprising. London critics were on the whole disparaging, with some notable exceptions. (Note: Among the exceptions were Michael Walsh of The Daily Express, Eric Johns of The Stage, and the influential Philip Richardson, editor of The Dancing Times and co-founder of the Camargo Society.) In the 1948–9 season for instance the Sadler's Wells company at Covent Garden performed 22 ballets, four of them new productions. London also had its two other resident companies with full programs (Sadler's Wells Theatre Ballet and Ballet Rambert) and the short lived Metropolitan Ballet, and three companies visited London from overseas (Ballets de Champs Elysees, Marquis de Cuevas’ Ballet and Roland Petit's Ballet). International Ballet did one short eight week London season with a repertoire of ten ballets, none of them new. Naturally London critics found this disappointing.
On the other hand, nation-wide critics across the country were almost without exception enthusiastic, about the productions and the artistic quality of the dancing. (Note: Kay Hunter's book contains many extracts from these critics' reports. One from Nottingham after the company's fourth tour went " ....there is enough talent among the dancers to form the backbone of at least half a dozen companies.... ") The repertoire, large for a touring company though small by London standards, was ample when visiting a town for a week or a fortnight, and International Ballet was probably the only ballet company that town ever saw.
In 1941 International Ballet had official approval, in that a number of its male dancers were exempted from military service. They were considered to be doing their part for the war effort by helping to keep civilian morale high. By 1953 "official" opinion had changed, and International Ballet was the only large British Ballet company refused a grant by the Arts Council.

== Facts and Figures ==
The lists of productions and personnel have been compiled from these sources:

- Kay Hunter's book of Mona Inglesby's recollections, which were backed by her personal records.
- Old theatre programmes from the period 1942-1953.
- Geoffrey Handley-Taylor's book which describes the productions staged between 1941 and 1947.

=== Productions ===
The first date given for each ballet is the date International Ballet first staged it. The ballet would have been in preparation for some time before that. The second is the date of the last performance that has been discovered in old theatre programmes.

Dates	Ballet	Music	Choreography	Producer	Decor	Costumes	Premiere
1941–45	Endymion	Moscowski	Mona Inglesby	Mona Inglesby	Sophie Fedorovitch	Sophie Fedorovitch	Inglesby 1938
1941–45	Amoras	Elgar	Mona Inglesby	Mona Inglesby	Chappell	Chappell	Inglesby 1940
1941–45	Carnaval	Schumann	Fokine	Idzikowski		Léon Bakst	Maryinsky 1910
1941–53	Les Sylphides	Chopin	Fokine	Idzikowski	Rex Whistler	Fokine	Ballet Russe 1909
1941–46	Swan Lake Scene 2	Tchaikovsky	Petipa	Nicholas Sergeyev	Chappell	Chappell	Maryinsky 1876
1941–45	Polovtsian Dances	Borodin	Ivanov	Nicholas Sergeyev			Maryinsky 1890
1941–42	Planetomania	Norman de Muth	Mona Inglesby	Mona Inglesby	Doris Zinkeisen	Doris Zinkeisen	IB 1941
1942–43	Fete Boheme		Harold Turner	Harold Turner	Beryl Dean	Beryl Dean	IB 1941
1942–53	Coppélia	Delibes	Petipa	Nicholas Sergeyev	Hein Heckroth	Hein Heckroth	Paris 1870
1942–50	Giselle	Adolphe Adam	Coralli/ Perrot	Nicholas Sergeyev	Doris Zinkeisen	Doris Zinkeisen	Paris 1842
1942	Sleeping Princess $ Act 1	Tchaikovsky	Petipa	Nicholas Sergeyev	Doris Zinkeisen	Doris Zinkeisen	Maryinsky 1889
1943–46	Twelfth Night	Grieg	Andrée Howard	Mona Inglesby	Doris Zinkeisen	Doris Zinkeisen	IB 1943
1943–45	Everyman	Richard Strauss	Mona Inglesby	Leslie French	Rex Whistler	Chappell	IB 1943
1944	Aurora's Wedding	Tchaikovsky	Petipa	Nicholas Sergeyev	Doris Zinkeisen	Doris Zinkeisen	Ballet Russe 1922
1944–45	Dances Espagnoles	Verennes	Angelo Andes	Angelo Andes	Hein Heckroth	Honoria Plesch	IB 1944
1946–48	Masque of Comus	Handel	Mona Inglesby	Leslie French	Doris Zinkeisen	Doris Zinkeisen	IB 1946
1947–53	Sleeping Princess $	Tchaikovsky	Petipa	Nicholas Sergeyev	Chervachidze/ Heckroth	Chervachidze/ Heckroth	Maryinsky 1889
1947–53	Swan Lake	Tchaikovsky	Petipa	Nicholas Sergeyev	Chappell	Chappell	Maryinsky 1876
1948–49	Sea Legend	Esther Rofe	Dorothy Stevenson	Dorothy Stevenson	Bainbridge		IB 1948
1949–50	Visions	Mussorgsky	Julian Algo	Julian Algo	Julian Algo		Sweden 1942
1951–53	Capriccio Espagnoles	Rimsky-Korsakov	Massine	Massine			Ballet Russe 1939
1951–52	For Love or Money	Gilbert Vintner	Algeranoff	Algeranoff	Denis Wreford	John Bainbridge	IB 1951
1951–53	Gaîté Parisienne	Offenbach	Massine	Massine			Ballet Russe 1938

$ The title Sleeping Beauty was coined for the first time by Ninette de Valois for the Sadler's Wells revival of 1946. Prior to that the ballet was universally called Sleeping Princess, including by Sadler's Wells for its 1939 Sergeyev-directed production.

=== Staff ===
Company Director and Artistic Director - Mona Inglesby
Company Manager - Guy Charles, Miss E. Fleetwood, Dorothy Brown
Administrator - Edwin Derrington
Stage Director - George Morgan, Harry Winton, Bertram Parham, Guy Bloomer
Wardrobe Mistress - Mrs Inglesby, May Attewell, Mrs Razelle

=== Ballet Masters ===
Stanislas Idzikowski (1941–44).
After Idzikowski left the company the term "ballet master" was no longer used on programmes, but the following performed the duties of ballet master:-
Nicholas Sergeyev (1942–~50), Geoffrey Espinosa (~1948–53), Ernest Hewitt (~1948–53).

=== Musical Directors ===
George Weldon (1941–43)
Ernest Irving (1943–47)
James Walker (1947–53)
Anthony Baines (Associate Conductor, ~1949–53)

=== Artistes ===
Kay Hunter's book lists 213 artistes who appeared with International Ballet at some time in its 12-year life. Those who were not dancers were actors for the productions of Everyman and The Masque of Comus.
Those taking principal roles included the following:-

from the beginning	Mona Inglesby, Nina Tarakanova, Harold Turner
during the war	(Harcourt) Algeranoff, Claudie Leonard/Algeranova, Leslie French (actor)
post-war	Jack Spurgeon, Herida May, Denys Palmer, Ernest Hewitt, Joan Tucker, Helene Armfelt, Anne Suren, Errol Addison
guest artistes	Paul Petroff. (1947), Nana Gollner (1947), Bjorn Holmgren, Yurek Shablevsky (1951)

== Notes and references ==
Notes
