= Enchanted Forest (Rhode Island) =

Fairy tale-themed amusement park

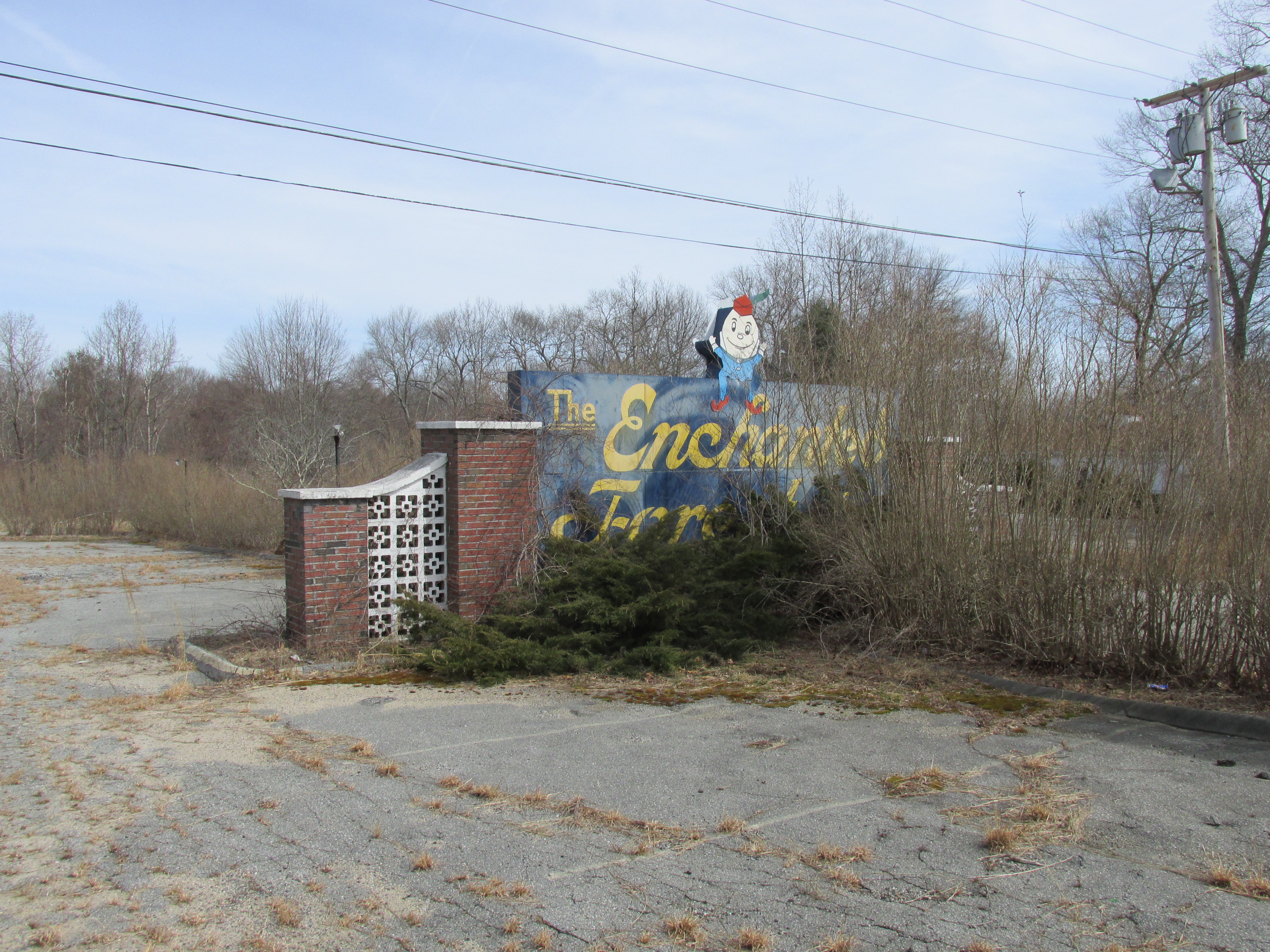
Enchanted Forest sign

The Enchanted Forest was a fairy tale-themed amusement park that opened in 1971 (55 years ago) in Hope Valley, Rhode Island, United States. Throughout its lifetime, it was mainly oriented to younger children and families. The park contained rides such as a child-sized roller coaster, bumper cars, and a merry go round, as well as having a live petting zoo and a miniature golf course. It occupied about 20 acres (8 ha). The Enchanted Forest was closed in 2005 (21 years ago) due to low money flow. The rides were sold through an auction.

== See also ==
- Rocky Point Amusement Park
