= Nicholas Sergeyev =

Russian ballet dancer (1876–1951)

Nicholas Grigoryevich Sergeyev (1876–1951) (Russian: Никола́й Григорьевич Серге́ев, variously written in the Latin alphabet as Nicholas or Nikolai Sergeev, Sergueev or Sergueeff etc.) was a Russian ballet dancer, choreographer and teacher, and regisseur of the Imperial Ballet at the Maryinsky Theatre, St Petersburg. He fled Russia in 1919 and spent the rest of his life in the West, producing ballets for many of the leading western companies of the time. He is remembered for preserving what is now called the Sergeyev Collection for future generations.

Sergeyev was born on 15 September 1876 in St Petersburg. He was accepted for training by the Imperial Ballet School and he graduated and joined the company in 1894. He was promoted to soloist and régisseur in 1904 and régisseur-général in 1914. He was thus the last ever régisseur-général of the Imperial Ballet.

In 1919 he and his wife fled Russia, as did many Russian ballet professionals after the Bolshevik revolution. It was a hazardous journey and the last leg was from Riga on a British warship. He was not the only one the Royal Navy helped to escape. Tamara Karsavina escaped from Murmansk with her husband, the British diplomat Henry James Bruce, with the aid of sailors of a British cruiser stationed in the White Sea, and Mathilde Kschessinskaya escaped from the Black Sea port of Novorossisk with her lover and future husband, the Grand Duke Andrei Vladimirovich, with the aid of sailors at a British base there. Not for nothing did Soviet Russia describe the British and other nations that interfered in the Russian Civil War as the “foreign interventionists”

Sergeyev brought with him the records of the Marius Petipa and Lev Ivanov choreographies of some 20 classical ballets in the Stepanov notation, what is now known as the Sergeyev Collection, fearing that these invaluable records would be lost to posterity in the upheaval of the Bolshevik Revolution and the Civil War that followed. He used these records in his subsequent employment by many of the leading Western ballet companies of the time, and after his death they finished up housed at the Harvard University Library Theatre Collection.

In 1921 he met Serge Diaghilev in Paris. He had of course known Diaghilev in St Petersburg when they both worked for the Imperial Ballet. Diaghilev hired him for his Ballets Russes company and brought him to London to reproduce in its original form the ballet Sleeping Princess (now known as Sleeping Beauty) for his financially disastrous 1921 season at the Alhambra Theatre.

After disagreements with Diaghilev he went to Riga as regisseur of the Latvian National Opera Ballet. He also founded his own company and produced Act IV of La Bayadere, La Fille mal Gardee, and Paquita, all from his Maryinsky notations.

In 1924 the émigré Russian Prima Ballerina Olga Spessivtseva hired him to produce Giselle for her at the Paris Opera. This was a huge success, and gained for him the medal of L'Academie Nationale de Musique et la Danse.

Back in Riga he found his own ballet company in financial difficulties, so he joined the newly formed Russian Opera Company as ballet master. The company went on a world tour producing excerpts from classical ballets and operatic interludes. In 1934 this company was disbanded and Sergeyev came to London. He produced Giselle first for the Camargo Society and then for the Vic-Wells Company, with Spessivtseva, Markova and Dolin dancing lead roles at some of the performances. He stayed with the Vic-Wells to produce Swan Lake, Coppelia, and Casse Noisette, and then the 1939 production of Sleeping Princess. He was ballet master for the Vic-Wells from 1937 to 1942, when Vera Volkova took over.

At the same time he did some work for International Ballet, the fledgling touring company formed by Mona Inglesby in 1941. When he left Sadler's Wells he joined International Ballet, as ballet master and director of the International Ballet School in Queensberry Mews, South Kensington. He never had a formal contract but it was an arrangement that suited both sides admirably and he stayed with International Ballet for the rest of his life. He had a new company of young dancers to train and rehearse in the traditions of the Maryinsky and a young director who believed in his methods. Inglesby had the only person in the world outside Soviet Russia who could produce the classical ballets in their original Petipa/Ivanov forms, which is what she wanted her company to do. Between 1942 and 1948 he re-created full length productions of the classics Giselle, Coppelia, Sleeping Princess and Swan Lake, as well as some shorter ballets and some short extracts from the classics.

He worked with International Ballet until his health started to fail, and he died in Nice on 23 June 1951 aged 74.
