= Belinda Wright (dancer) =

British ballet dancer (1929–2007)

- Born: Brenda Wright; 18 January 1929; Southport, England
- Died: 1 April 2007 (aged 78); Zurich, Switzerland
- Awards: Anna Pavlova Cup

Belinda Wright (18 January 1929 – 1 April 2007) was an English ballerina noted for romantic and classical roles.

== Life and career ==
She was born Brenda Wright in Southport, Lancashire (later Merseyside). She was the daughter of a coal merchant, and as a sickly child was advised to take dance classes for her health. She studied under Dorothea Halliwell, Olga Preobrajenska in Paris and Kathleen Crofton in London, and won awards for young dancers including the Anna Pavlova Cup and the Dancing Times Cup.

Wright began working with Ballet Rambert in 1946. After further studies, she joined the London Festival Ballet, where she danced as prima ballerina and became best known for her work in ballets including Harlequinade and Giselle. She also danced for Roland Petit's Ballet de Paris, Le Grand Ballet du Marquis de Cuevas, and the Royal Ballet. Her farewell performance took place in 1977 in Tokyo, and afterward she worked as a dance teacher.

Wright married Swiss dancer Wolfgang Brunner; they had a son Christopher but divorced in 1960. She then married her dance partner Jelko Yuresha in 1961; daughter Anabelle was born a year later. The family resided in Zurich, Switzerland, and New York. She died of coronary complications in Zurich at the age of 78.
