= Violetta Elvin =

Russian ballet dancer (1923–2021)

- Born: Violetta Vassilievna Prokhorova; 3 November 1923; Moscow, Russia
- Died: 27 May 2021 (aged 97)
- Occupations: Prima ballerina, actress
- Spouse(s): Harold Elvin; Siegbert Weinberger; Fernando Savarese
- Children: 1 son

Violetta Elvin (née Prokhorova; 3 November 1923 – 27 May 2021) was a Russian prima ballerina and actress. In 1986, The Times described Elvin as "the only rival ever to give Dame Margot Fonteyn a run for her money".

== Early life ==
Elvin was born on 3 November 1923 in Moscow, and graduated from the Moscow State Dance School in 1942. She was the daughter of Irena Grimouzinskaya, an actor and artist, and Vassilie Prokhorov, an aviation pioneer.

== Career ==
Elvin was only 20 when she had already danced the leads in Swan Lake, Marius Petipa's Don Quixote, and The Fountain of Bakhchisarai with the State Ballet of Tashkent.

From 1951 to 1956 she was a prima ballerina of Sadler's Wells Ballet, now The Royal Ballet, before retiring and moving to Italy.

== Personal life ==
In 1945, she met and married British architect Harold Elvin in Moscow, and was allowed to leave the USSR. On the journey, she played chess with Dimitri Shostakovich. They divorced in 1952. In 1953, she married the American impresario Siegbert Weinberger, but this also ended in divorce.

In 1959, she married Fernando Savarese, an Italian lawyer who also managed the family hotel on the Sorrento peninsula. They had a son, Antonio "Toti" in 1960.

A biographical novel about Elvin, written by Raffaele Lauro, titled Dance The Love - A Star in Vico Equense, was presented in Vico Equense, in a national première, on 27 July 2016, within the Social World Film Festival - International Exhibition of Social Cinema.

Raffaele Lauro also co-authored the volume, Dance the Love - A Star in Vico Equense. Images - Testimonies, GoldenGate Edizioni, 2016 with Riccardo Piroddi, .

Elvin died in May 2021 at the age of 97.

== Repertoire ==
- Swan Lake
- Don Quixote
- The Fountain of Bakhchisarai
- The Sleeping Beauty
- Ballet Imperial
- The Three-Cornered Hat
- Birthday Offering
- Cinderella
- Daphnis et Chloé
