= Anton Dolin (ballet dancer) =

Ballet dancer and choreographer (1904–1983)

Sir Anton Dolin
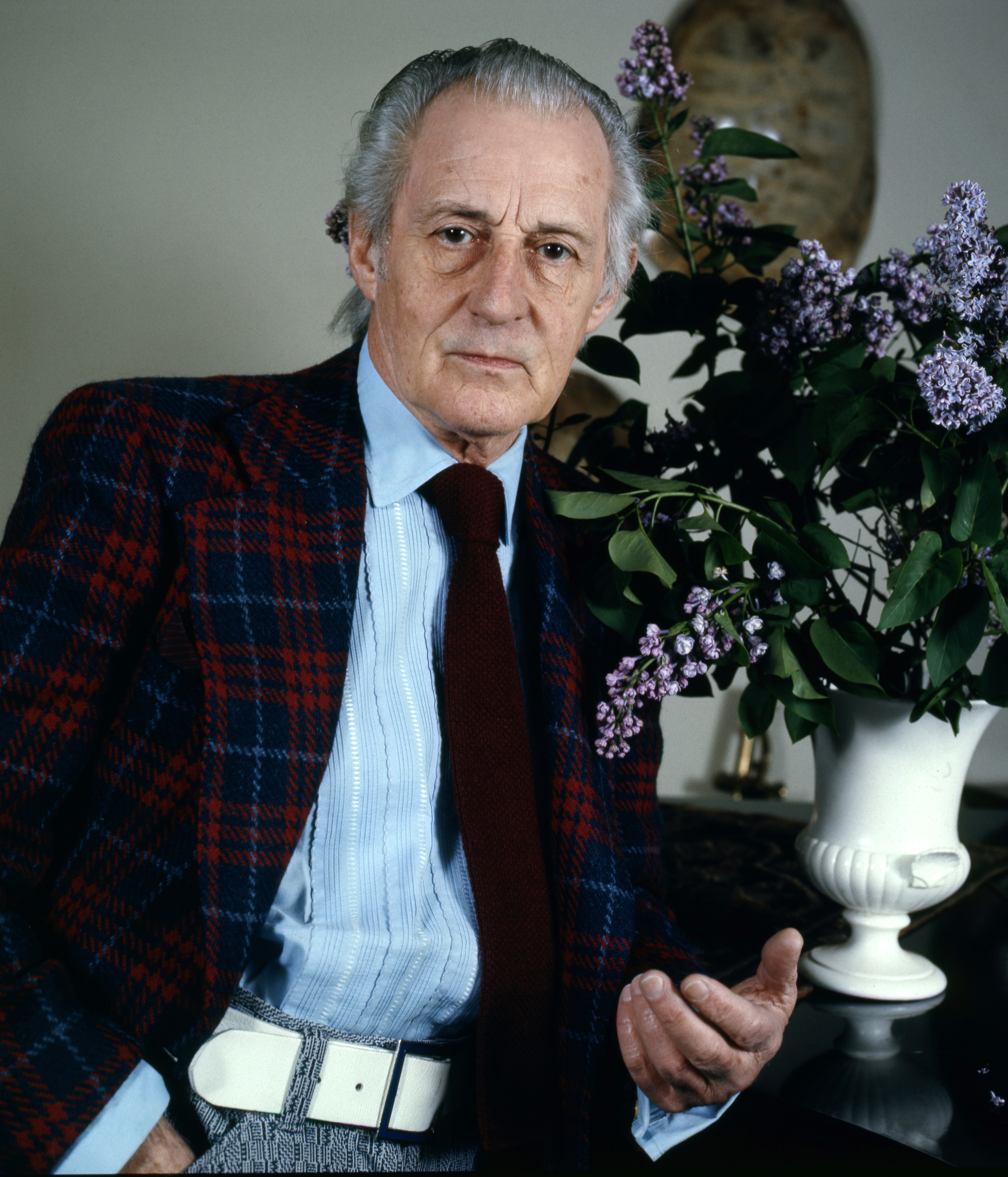
- Portrait of Sir Anton Dolin by Allan Warren
- Born: Sydney Francis Patrick Chippendall Healey-Kay; 27 July 1904; Slinfold, West Sussex, England
- Died: 25 November 1983 (aged 79); Paris, France
- Occupations: ballet dancer and choreographer

Sir Anton Dolin (27 July 1904 – 25 November 1983) was an English ballet dancer and choreographer.

== Biography ==
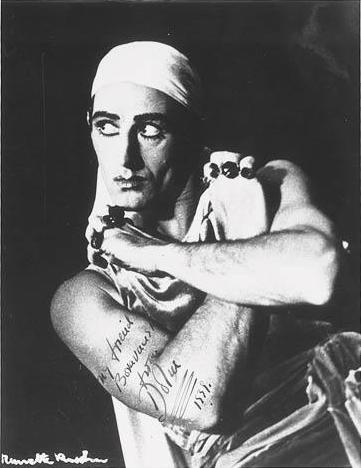
Dolin in The Prodigal Son, Ballets Russes, during the Australian Tour of 1939

Dolin was born in Slinfold in Sussex as Sydney Francis Patrick Chippendall Healey-Kay (generally known as Patrick or Pat Kay to his friends). He was the second of three sons of Henry George Kay (1852–1922) and his wife, Helen Maude Chippendall Healey (1869–1960), from Dublin. He trained at Serafina Astafieva's school at The Pheasantry in London's King's Road. In 1921, he joined the Ballets Russes under the guidance of Sergei Diaghilev, the pre-eminent ballet impresario of the time, becoming a principal dancer from 1924. It was Diaghilev who gave Patrick his stage name: Diaghilev 'russified' names of his star dancers to keep up the tradition of his company.

In the 1930s, Dolin was a principal with the Vic-Wells Ballet. There he danced with Alicia Markova, with whom he went on to found the Markova-Dolin Ballet and the London Festival Ballet. In 1933, he spotted Vera Zorina and introduced her to Ballets Russes de Monte Carlo in 1934. He joined Ballet Theatre when it was formed in 1940 and remained there as a dancer and choreographer until 1946.

Dolin wrote several books, including: Divertissement (1931), the autobiography Ballet Go Round (1938) and Alicia Markova: Her Life and Art (1953). He was knighted in 1981. He is featured in the documentary film A Portrait of Giselle.

He was the subject of This Is Your Life in April 1978 when he was surprised by Eamonn Andrews at London's Royal Academy of Dance. Upon Dolin's death, dancers Jelko Yuresha and Belinda Wright inherited the rights to his choreography of Giselle, Pas de Quatre, and his acclaimed original ballet, Variations for Four. Yuresha and Wright danced—and later staged—productions of these ballets with dance companies around the world, designing original costumes and sets for those performances. In 2017, Yuresha (rights holder) and Philip Ronald Kay (Dolin's nephew and heir) founded the Sir Anton Dolin Foundation in Berlin, Germany with the aim of protecting Dolin's legacy. Since then, all rights to Dolin's works are the property of the Sir Anton Dolin Foundation.

== Filmography ==
Film
Year	Title	Role	Notes
1929	Dark Red Roses	Dancer	Uncredited
1930	Alf's Button		
1934	Forbidden Territory	Jack Straw	
1935	Invitation to the Waltz	Chief Dancer	
1945	A Song for Miss Julie	Himself – Ballet Dancer	
1953	Never Let Me Go	Marya's Partner	Uncredited
1974	The Girl from Petrovka	Ignatievitch	
1980	Nijinsky	Maestro Cecchetti	

== Sources ==
- Dolin, Anton (1960). Anton Dolin: Autobiography. London: Oldbourne. OCLC 220952622.
- Dolin, Anton (1985). Last Words: A Final Autobiography. London: Century. ISBN 9780712607292.
- Dolin, Anton (1953). Markova: Her Life and Art. London: W.H. Allen. OCLC 3290257.
- Hall, Alfred George, ed. (1957). Alicia Markova and Anton Dolin: A Legend of British Ballet : A Collection of Portraits. London: Hall Publications. OCLC 7643659.
- Simpson, Jane (30 September 1997). "Legends: Anton Dolin". Balletco Magazine. Archived from the original on 9 September 2010.
- Nechaev, S. (2022). Русская Италия [Russian Italy] (in Russian). Argumenti Nedeli Publishing House. ISBN 9785045190206.
