= Nikolai Legat =

Russian ballet dancer (1869–1937)

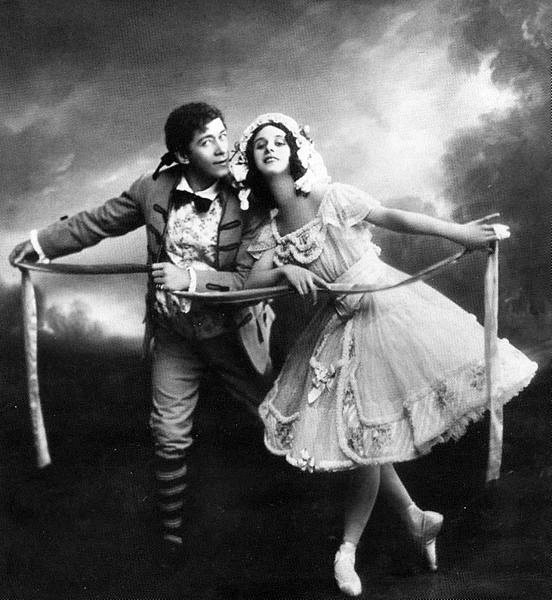
- La fille mal gardée, Anna Pavlova as Lise, Nikolai Legat as Colas, c. 1910
- Born: Nikolai Gustavovich Legat; 30 December 1869; Moscow, Russia
- Died: 24 January 1937 (aged 67); London, England
- Occupation: Ballet dancer

Nikolai Gustavovich Legat (Russian: Никола́й Густа́вович Лега́т; 30 December 1869 – 24 January 1937) was a Russian ballet dancer, choreographer and teacher.

== Life and career ==
Nikolai Legat was born to a family of Swedish origin, all of whom were dancers—his father Gustav Legat was a soloist of the Imperial Ballet of St. Petersburg and teacher of ballet at the Moscow Theatrical School while his mother Maria Semyonovna Legat (née Granken) was a character dancer. Like his four siblings, the young Nikolai was accepted into the Imperial Ballet School at the age of ten, and during his years there, he counted Marius Petipa, Pavel Gerdt and Christian Johansson among his teachers. Legat graduated in 1888 and was immediately offered a position with the Imperial Ballet in the rank of sujet (soloist), completely bypassing having to dance in the corps de ballet. Both he and his younger brother, Sergey, became ballet masters and caricaturists.

Legat is considered to be the main successor to Pavel Gerdt. Legat later served as a ballet master in Russia, teaching and passing on the repertoire of the Imperial ballet company, whose groundwork was the legacy of the great choreographer-ballet master, Marius Petipa. He left Russia with his third wife, Nadine, in 1922 and eventually settled in England in 1926. The couple opened their first ballet school in Kent. They were later able to start classes in Hammersmith, London. Among their notable pupils were Ninette de Valois and Margot Fonteyn.

Legat's wife, Nadine Nicolaeva, was a prima ballerina of the Imperial theatres in Russia. She choreographed dances based on the Movements Exercises of Gurdjieff and later founded the Legat School of Ballet in Kent. One of her students was Anneliese von Oettingen. Nadine Nicolaeva-Legat was a follower of P. D. Ouspensky. She choreographed dances based on the Movements Exercises of G. I Gurdjieff. In 1938, Ouspensky and his followers acquired Colet House in London, from Nadine Legat, where they established the Historico-Psychological Society.

Legat's granddaughter, Tatiana Legat (1934–2022), was a Soviet and Russian ballerina, soloist in Leningrad Kirov Ballet (Mariinsky Theatre, St. Petersburg, Russia) and ballet pedagogue.

== See also ==
- List of dancers
- List of Russian ballet dancers
