= List of Italian dancers =

List of Italian dancers in alphabetical order:

== A ==
- Eleonora Abbagnato
- Amedeo Amodio
- Gasparo Angiolini
- Simone Arena
- Alba Arnova
- Alexis Arts
- Luigi Astolfi
- Simona Atzori
- Silvia Azzoni

== B ==
- Teresa Bandettini
- Alice Bellagamba
- Alessandra Belloni
- Maurizio Benenato
- Caterina Beretta
- Carlo Blasis
- Roberto Bolle
- Aida Boni
- Valentina Bonariva
- Francesca Braggiotti
- Gloria Braggiotti Etting
- Rossella Brescia
- Carlotta Brianza
- Amalia Brugnoli

== C ==
- Flavia Cacace
- Sara Carlson (American/Italian)
- Fabritio Caroso
- Raffaella Carrà
- Gaetano Casanova
- Enrico Cecchetti
- Giannina Censi
- Fanny Cerrito
- Cosima Coppola
- Vito Coppola
- Maria Cumani Quasimodo

== D ==
- Stefano De Martino
- Stefano Di Filippo
- Simone Di Pasquale
- Sara Di Vaira
- Domenico da Piacenza
- Graziano Di Prima
- Oriella Dorella
- Giulia Dotta
- Viviana Durante

== F ==
- Gaynor Fairweather
- Denise Faro
- Amalia Ferraris
- Alessandra Ferri
- Carla Fracci

== G ==
- Mara Galeazzi
- Rosina Galli (dancer) (1892-1940) prima ballerina at La Scala Theatre Ballet, Chicago Ballet, as well as the première danseuse of the Metropolitan Opera House
- Giuseppe Giofrè
- Jacopo Godani
- Carlotta Grisi
- Fabio Grossi
- Nicola Guerra

== K ==
- Kledi Kadiu

== L ==
- Guido Lauri
- Pierina Legnani
- Don Lurio

== M ==
- Gennaro Magri
- Daniela Malusardi
- Marisa Maresca
- Lorenza Mario
- Alessandra Martines
- Angela Melillo
- Liliana Merlo
- Totò Mignone

== N ==
- Cesare Negri

== P ==
- Lola Pagnani
- Heather Parisi
- Giuliana Penzi
- Laura Peperara
- Samuel Peron
- Giovanni Pernice
- Cristian Priori

== R ==
- Renato Rascel
- Sara Renda
- Federica Ridolfi
- Pasquale La Rocca
- Carolina Rosati
- Giorgio Rossi
- Jia Ruskaja
- Carmen Russo

== S ==
- Luciana Savignano
- Delia Scala
- Catherine Spaak

== T ==
- Filippo Taglioni
- Maria Taglioni
- Noemi Maria Tali
- Alberto Testa
- Jacopo Tissi
- Natalia Titova
- Raimondo Todaro

== V ==
- Odette Valery
- Ambra Vallo
- Luca Veggetti
- Auguste Vestris
- Gaetano Vestris
- Salvatore Viganò

== Z ==
- Virginia Zucchi
