= Italian ballet =

Training methods and aesthetic qualities in classical ballet in Italy

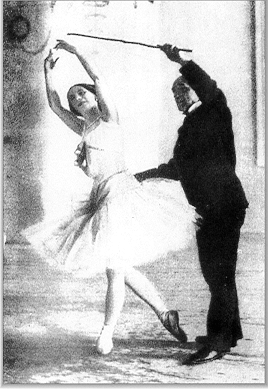
Russian ballerina Anna Pavlova being taught the Cecchetti method by renowned Italian ballet teacher Enrico Cecchetti.

Italian ballet is the training methods and aesthetic qualities seen in classical ballet in Italy. Ballet has a long history in Italy, and it is widely believed that the earliest predecessor of modern-day ballet originated in the Italian courts of the Renaissance. Two predominant training systems are used to teach Italian ballet today: the Cecchetti method, devised by Enrico Cecchetti, and that of the La Scala Theatre Ballet School.

== History (origins of il ballo, or ballet) ==
Ballet began during the Italian Renaissance court as an outgrowth of court pageantry, where aristocratic weddings were lavish celebrations. Court musicians and dancers collaborated to provide elaborate entertainment for them. Ballet was further shaped by the French ballet de cour, which consisted of social dances performed by the nobility in tandem with music, speech, verse, song, pageant, decor and costume. When Catherine de' Medici, an Italian aristocrat with an interest in the arts, married the French crown heir Henry II, she brought her enthusiasm for dance to France and provided financial support. These glittering entertainments supported the aims of court politics and usually were organized around mythological themes.

A ballet of the Renaissance was a far cry from the form of theatrical entertainment known to audiences today. Tutus, ballet slippers and pointe work were not yet used. The choreography was adapted from court dance steps. Performers dressed in fashions of the times. For women that meant formal gowns that covered their legs to the ankle. Early ballet was participatory, with the audience joining the dance towards the end.

Domenico da Piacenza was one of the first dancing masters. Along with his students, Antonio Cornazzano and Guglielmo Ebreo, he was trained in dance and responsible for teaching nobles the art. Da Piacenza left one work: De arte saltandi et choreus ducendi (On the art of dancing and conducting dances), which was put together by his students.

Ballet, if not the first, produced and shown was Baldassare de Belgiojoso's balletto comico, also known as Balthasar de Beaujoyeulx's Ballet Comique de la Reine (1581) and was a ballet comique (ballet drama). In the same year, the publication of Fabritio Caroso's Il Ballarino, a technical manual on court dancing, both performance and social, helped to establish Italy as a centre of technical ballet development.

At first, ballets were woven in to the midst of an opera to allow the audience a moment of relief from the dramatic intensity. By the mid-seventeenth century, Italian ballets in their entirety were performed in between the acts of an opera. Over time, Italian ballets became a more beloved and important part of theatrical life: ballet companies in Italy's major opera houses employed an average of four to twelve dancers; in 1815 many companies employed anywhere from eighty to one hundred dancers.

== Notable companies & schools ==
- La Scala Theatre Ballet
- La Scala Theatre Ballet School

== Notable Italian dancers ==
- Roberto Bolle
- Enrico Cecchetti
- Fanny Cerrito
- Oriella Dorella
- Viviana Durante
- Alessandra Ferri
- Carla Fracci
- Mara Galeazzi
- Carlotta Grisi
- Pierina Legnani
- Luciana Savignano
- Marie Taglioni
