= Petra Conti =

Italian ballerina

- Born: 1988 (age 37–38); Anagni, Italy
- Occupation: Ballerina
- Years active: 2007–present
- Spouse: Eris Nezha
- Career
- Former groups: Mariinsky Ballet; Bavarian State Ballet; La Scala Theatre Ballet; Boston Ballet; Los Angeles Ballet

Petra Conti (born April 30, 1988) is an Italian ballerina. She is a former principal dancer with Los Angeles Ballet, the Boston Ballet and La Scala Theatre Ballet.

She has danced as a guest principal dancer with Arena di Verona, the Great Russian Ballet, the National Opera of Ukraine, the Ballet Opera of Istanbul, the National Theatre of Opera and Ballet of Albania in Tirana.

== Early life and education ==
Petra Conti was born on April 30, 1988, in Anagni and grew up in Frosinone, Italy. Her father is Italian and her mother is Polish. Her mother and sister trained at the Academy of Ballet in Poland.

Conti trained at Szewczenko M.M. School of Ballet in Poland and later at National Dance Academy in Rome, graduating from the latter in 2006.

== Career ==
At seventeen years old, Conti was a guest dancer in the Arena di Verona Ballet's Cinderella. At the National Academy of Dance, she trained under the guidance of Zarko Prebil and later joined the Mariinsky Ballet as a trainee, where she worked with Elvira Tarasova.

In 2008, she danced with the Bavarian State Ballet. In 2009, she joined La Scala Theatre Ballet and was promoted to principal dancer in 2011. In 2013, Conti was invited by Mikko Nissinen to join the Boston Ballet, where she was a principal dancer until 2017. In late-2017, she joined the Los Angeles Ballet as a resident principal guest dancer.

From 2017 to 2019, Conti was an artistic consultant at the State Ballet Academy Educandato agli Angeli in Verona, Italy. She is a resident ballet coach at Pasadena Civic Ballet and a guest ballet coach for University of South Carolina, Orange County School of the Arts, and Southeastern School of Ballet.

She served as a ballet judge for the 2023 Youth American Grand Prix. The same year, she founded her own ballet company Hollywood Ballet in Los Angeles.

== Awards and recognition ==
At fifteen, TV host Raffaella Carrá introduced Conti on her show as "the future of Italian ballet in the world". In the show, a teenage Conti travels to Russia to perform a pas de deux with Roberto Bolle.

Conti was the subject of a 2010 Sky Italia documentary titled Dancers of Tomorrow , focusing on her performances in Giselle, Romeo and Juliet, and Don Quixote. In 2012, she was called the Anna Magnani of ballet by Panorama.

== Controversies ==
In the summer of 2017 and 2018, Conti played an Ethiopian princess in Aida and performed multiple shows in blackface at the Arena di Verona, Italy. In a now-deleted Instagram post, Conti is seen, alongside her makeup artist, applying dark makeup for an upcoming show. She received criticism from the ballet community, including American ballerina Sydney Magruder Washington, for continued usage of blackface in her performances.

== Personal life ==
Conti is married to ballet dancer Eris Nezha.

In 2016, Conti underwent surgery for kidney cancer.

== Selected repertoire ==
- Giselle - Giselle (chor. Yvette Chauvirè)
- Kitri - Don Quixotte (chor. Rudolf Nureyev)
- Juliet - Romeo and Juliet (chor. Kenneth MacMillan)
- Tatiana - Onegin (chor. John Cranko)
- Jewels - Emerald: I, II couple (chor. Balanchine)
- Raymonda, Clemence – Raymonda (chor. Petipa-Vicharev)
- Lady of the Camellias - Lady of the Camellias (chor. Val Caniparoli)
- Civilization, Folgore - Excelsior (chor. Dell'Ara)
- Titania - A Midsummer night dream (chor. Balanchine)
- Aurora - Sleeping Beauty (chor. Christensen after Petipa)
- Albachiara - L'altra Metá del Cielo (chor. Clarke, music Vasco Rossi)
- Marguerite - Marguerite and Armand (chor. Frederick Ashton)
- Principal Couple - Concerto DSCH (chor. Alexei Ratmansky)
- Juliette - Romèo et Juliette (chor. Sasha Waltz)
- Esmeralda - Notre-Dame de Paris (chor. Roland Petit)
- Odette/Odile - Swan Lake (chor. Rudolf Nureyev)
- In the Middle Somewhat Elevated (chor. William Forsythe)
- Odette/Odile - Swan Lake (chor. Mikko Nissinen)
- Prima Ballerina - Etudes (chor. Harald Lander)
- Sugar Plum Fairy, Snow Queen - Nutcracker (chor. Mikko Nissinen)
- The Puppet Couple - Bella Figura (chor. Jiri Kylian)
- Fairy Godmother - Cinderella (chor. Frederick Ashton)
- Belong Pas de Deux (chor. Norbert Vesak)
- Bach Cello Suites (chor. Jorma Elo)
- Eventide (chor. Helen Pickett)
- Glove Seller - Gaîté Parisienne (chor. Leonide Massine)
- Posthorn - Third Symphony of Gustav Mahler (chor. John Neumeier)
- Pas de Quatre (chor. Leonid Yacobson)
- Cinderella - Cinderella (chor. Maria Grazia Garofoli)
- Giselle - Giselle (chor. Maria Grazia Garofoli)
- Sanguinic - The Four Temperaments (chor. Balanchine)
- Second to Last (chor. Alejandro Cerrudo)
- This is You - (chor. Menghan Lou)
- Marie, Rose, Arabian Queen - Nutcracker (chor. Thordal Christensen)
- Odette/Odile - Swan Lake (chor. Thordal Christensen)
- Second Movement - Western Symphony (chor. George Balanchine)
- Les Chambres des Jacques (chor. Aszure Barton)
- Serenade (chor. Balanchine)
- La Sylphide (chor. Bournonville)
- Aegina - Spartakus (chor. Anatoly Shekera)
- Zingarella - La Traviata (chor. Giuseppe Picone)
- Rusalka - Forest Song (chor. Vronsky Vakhtang)
- Time (chor. Eris Nezha)
- Blackstone (chor. Gianluca Schiavoni)
- Agon (chor. George Balanchine)
- Terpsichore - Apollo (chor. George Balanchine)
- First Violin - Concerto Barocco (chor. George Balanchine)
- Nikiya - La Bayadere (chor. M. Petipa)
- Marguerite - Lady of the Camellias (chor. Val Caniparoli)
- Ghosts - Main Couple (chor. Christopher Wheeldon)
- Fool’s Paradise - Slow Couple (chor. Christopher Wheeldon)
