= Sabrina Brazzo =

Italian ballet dancer (born 1968)

Sabrina Brazzo (born 1 January 1968) is an Italian ballet dancer. A principal dancer with La Scala in Milan, she has performed in many of the world's most prestigious ballet theatres.

== Biography ==
Born in Portogruaro in north-eastern Italy, Brazzo grew up in Venice. After training at the La Scala Ballet School, she spent two years with the ballet company of Deutsche Oper am Rhein in Düsseldorf. She then returned to Milan to dance with La Scala Ballet where she was promoted to prima ballerina in 2001 after her performance in Sylvie Guillem's version of Giselle. Brazzo has danced in the great classical ballets as well as in many contemporary works, both at La Scala and in theatres across Europe and the Americas including the St Petersburg Ballet Theatre and at the Bolshoi Theatre in Moscow. She performed in Roland Petit's Carmen at the Teatro Municipal in Rio de Janeiro on the occasion of the theatre's 100th anniversary. In 2008, she partnered Roberto Bolle in Bolle and Friends.
