= Annamaria Galeotti =

Annamaria Galeotti is the Italian director of the National Dance Academy (Italy), located in Rome.

In the Academy of Dance, Galeotti is director and teacher of "Tecnica della Danza Classica". In 2019-2020-2021 she has been guest at the Accademia Nazionale di Danza “Europa in Danza", International stage and member of the Commission for the Prize "Europa in Danza".
