= Isaac Sinclair =

Isaac Sinclair is the name of:

- Isaac Sinclair (footballer), English footballer
- Isaac Sinclair (perfumer), New Zealand perfumer
