= Gilda Gelati =

Italian ballet dancer (born 1967)

Gilda Gelati (born 1967) is an Italian ballet dancer. She joined the La Scala Theatre Ballet in 1986 where she became a prima ballerina in 2001. She remained at La Scala until her retirement from the company in 2013.

== Biography ==
Born in Parma, from 1978 Gelati trained at La Scala Theatre Ballet School from where, after graduating in 1986, she joined the corps at the La Scala Theatre Ballet. She performed in a wide range of classical and contemporary works, including John Cranko's Romeo and Juliet, Rudolf Nureyev's Cinderella, Kenneth MacMillan's Manon, Michel Fokine's Petrushka and George Balanchine's A Midsummer Night's Dream.

In 2001, she was promoted to prima ballerina after dancing the title role in Sylvie Guillem's version of Giselle.
