= Vaganova method =

Ballet technique and training system

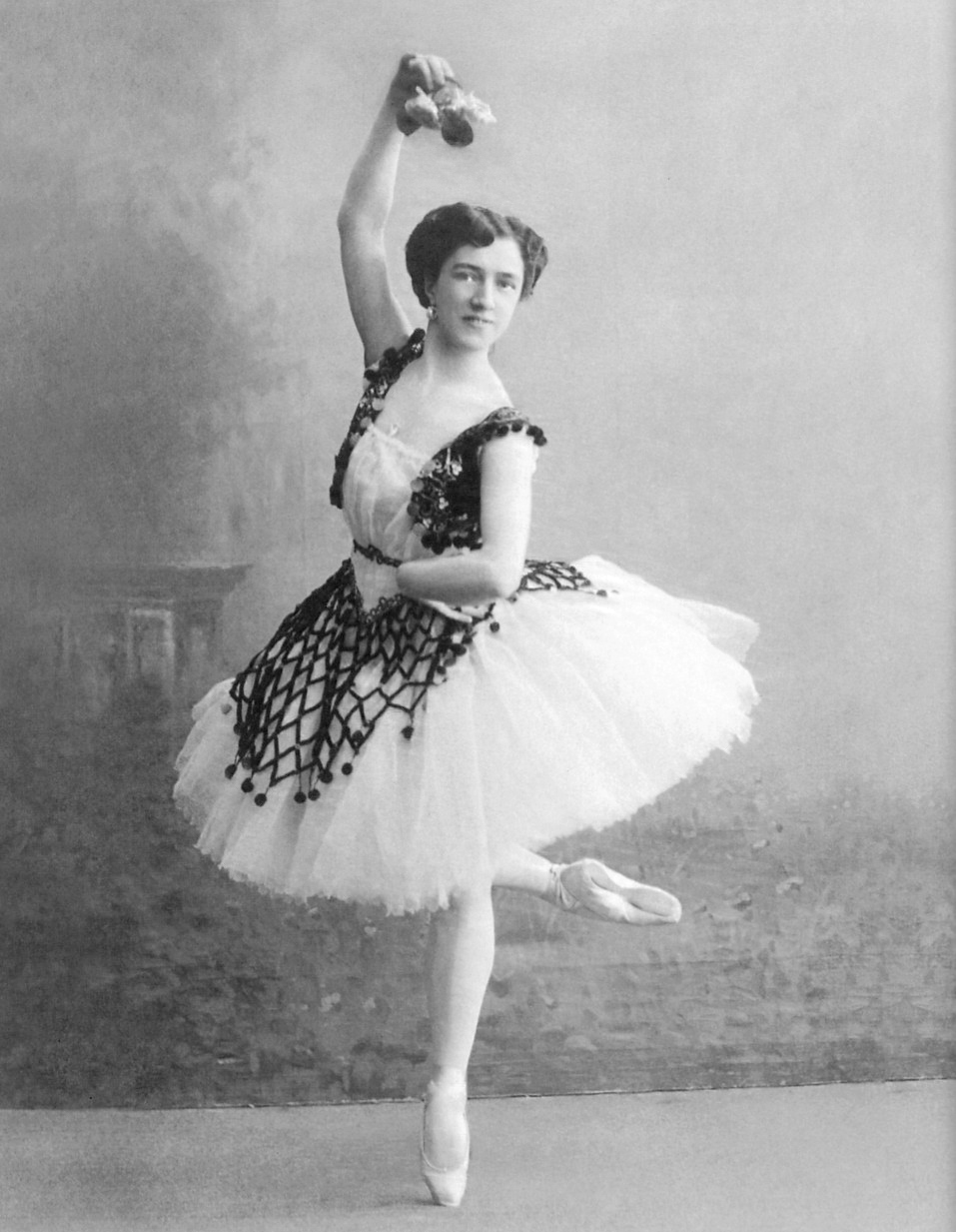
Agrippina Vaganova, founder of the Vaganova method, pictured in 1910.

The Vaganova method is a ballet technique and training system devised by the Russian dancer and pedagogue Agrippina Vaganova (1879–1951). It was derived from the teachings of the Premier Maître de Ballet Marius Petipa, throughout the late 19th century. It was Agrippina Vaganova who perfected and cultivated this form of teaching classical ballet and turned it into a viable syllabus. The method fuses elements of traditional French style from the romantic era with the athleticism and virtuosity of Italian Cecchetti technique. The training system is designed to involve the whole body in every movement, with equal attention paid to the upper body, legs and feet. Vaganova believed that this approach increases consciousness of the body, thus creating a harmony of movement and greater expressive range.

== History ==
Upon graduating from the Imperial Ballet School in Saint Petersburg in 1897, Agrippina Vaganova began dancing with the school's associated professional company, the Imperial Russian Ballet. She retired from dancing in 1916 to pursue a teaching career and in 1921 returned as a teacher at the school, which had been renamed the Leningrad Choreographic School.

During the 30 years she spent teaching at the Leningrad Choreographic School, Vaganova developed a ballet technique that combined elements of French, Italian, and earlier Russian technique, and a training method to teach the technique. Tenets of the training method included development of lower back strength and arm plasticity, and the strength, flexibility and endurance required for ballet, and it incorporated a detailed instruction process that specified when to teach each topic and how long to teach it. In 1934, Vaganova wrote Fundamentals of the Classical Dance, which remains a standard textbook for the instruction of ballet technique. In 1948, Vaganova authored a book titled The Foundation For Dance (more commonly known as Basic Principles of Russian Classical Dance) that outlined her training method and ballet technique. Following Vaganova's death in 1951, her teaching method was preserved by instructors such as Vera Volkova, and Vera Kostrovitskaya.

Today the Vaganova method is the most widely used ballet teaching method in Russia, but also used in other countries, such as Ukraine, Germany, and China. The State Ballet School of Berlin is the most well-known school using the Vaganova method outside Russia.

== Criticism ==
One criticism is that it overemphasizes perfection of physical conditioning, leading to training environments that promote anorexia and other unhealthy behavior.
