= Alberto Testa =

Alberto Testa may refer to:

- Alberto Testa (dancer) (1922–2019), Italian dancer
- Alberto Testa (lyricist) (1927–2009), Italian composer and lyricist
