= Daniel Lee (designer) =

English fashion designer

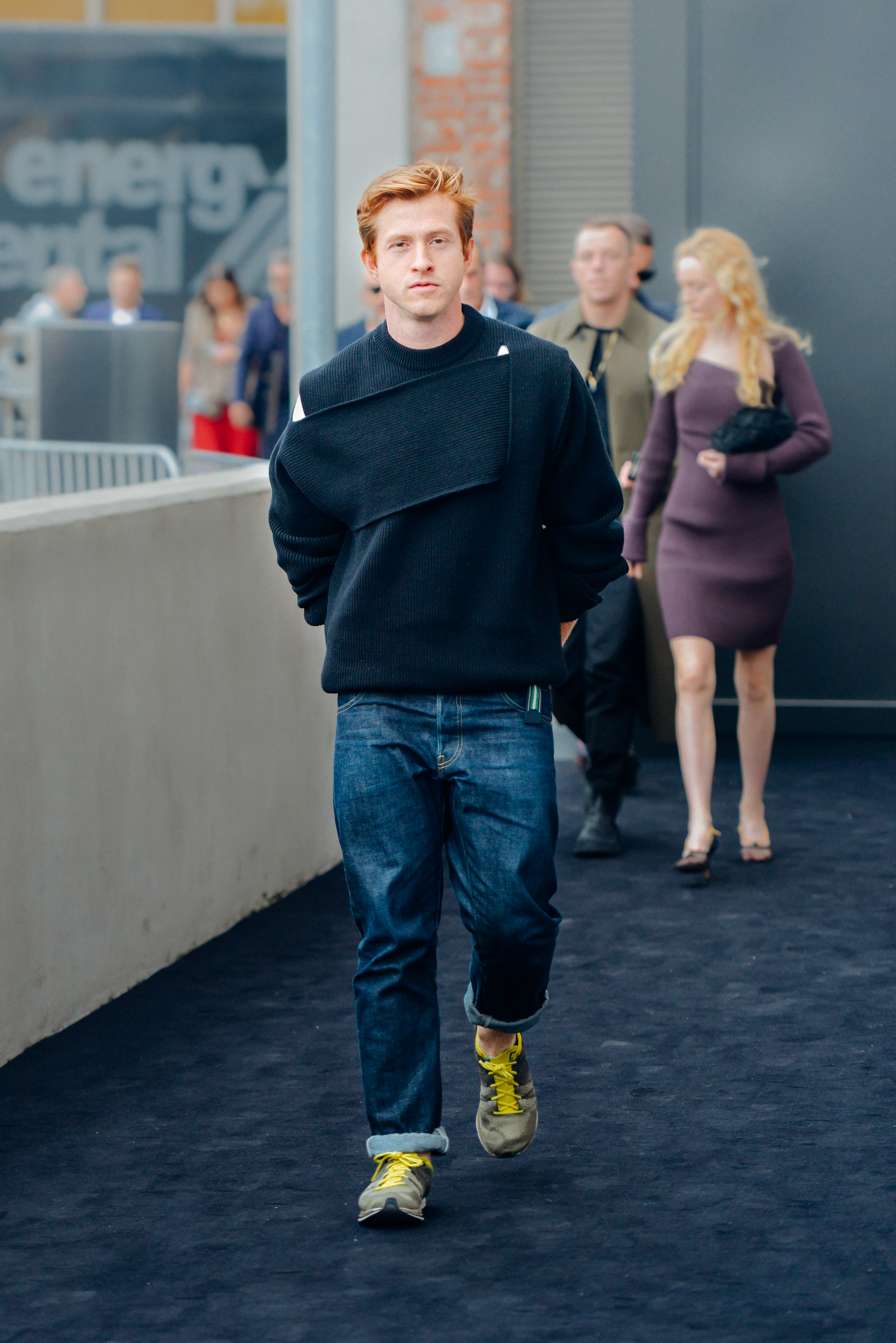
- Lee in 2019
- Born: 22 January 1986 (age 40); Bradford, England
- Education: Central Saint Martins
- Occupation: Fashion designer
- Years active: 2012–present
- Title: Creative director of Burberry (2022–present)

Daniel Lee (born 22 January 1986) is an English fashion designer. He was the creative director of the Italian luxury fashion house Bottega Veneta from 2018 to 2021, subsequently being appointed as Riccardo Tisci's replacement as Chief Creative Officer at the helm of Burberry.

== Early life ==
Daniel Lee grew up in Bradford, England. His father was a mechanic and his mother was an office worker. Daniel Lee first attended the Dixons City Academy, and then graduated from the Central Saint Martins College of Art and Design (master's degree) where he was tutored by Louise Wilson. He was an intern at Maison Margiela and Balenciaga (under the direction of Nicolas Ghesquière), and landed a position at Donna Karan in New York after his graduation in 2010.

In 2012, Lee left Donna Karan for Céline in Paris, where he started as a member of the design team and eventually became the director of ready-to-wear design. He assisted Phoebe Philo in developing the minimal aesthetic that led to the brand's booming popularity.

== Bottega Veneta ==
In June 2018, Kering appointed Lee as creative director of Bottega Veneta, to give a new impetus to the Italian luxury fashion house and develop its ready-to-wear collection. His agenda also included rebooting the men's ready-to-wear collection and launching a home collection.

Lee maintained the team of artisans. He preserved Bottega Veneta's emphasis on well-crafted, logoless and simplicity-driven products. To give a new look to Bottega Veneta, he inflated the Intrecciato designs to capitalize on the brand's most iconic features, and infused more hedonism/desirability in the brand's products. He designed the Pouch clutch bag which became the fastest selling bag in the history of the brand. Harpers Bazaar commented: Bottega Veneta has become one of fashion's most popular brands in 2019, thanks to its quiet, modern elegance reinterpreted by Lee. His transformation of Bottega Veneta is coined “New Bottega”. He was tagged "The Quiet Radical" by Vogue, and “fashion’s new wonder boy” by Harper's Bazaar.

Amid the COVID-19 pandemic, Lee collaborated with artist Rosemarie Trockel and actress, composer, and playwright Sheila Atim for the brand's 2021 ad campaign

In early April 2021, the Berlin police investigated whether large private gatherings staged by Bottega Veneta after a Salon event at the Soho House constituted illegal gatherings without social distancing or masking at the height of the pandemic when a city-wide regulation against private gatherings was in effect.

In 2021, Lee designed costumes for the Venice Dance Biennale, It also replaced the monthly fashion shows with private shows or of "salon".

On November 10, 2021, Bottega Veneta and Lee announced he would be leaving his post as creative director in a "joint decision to end their collaboration."

== Burberry ==
Subsequent to its Spring / Summer 2023 collection showing, British marque Burberry announced that its present Chief Creative Officer, Riccardo Tisci, would be stepping down from the company and was to be replaced by Lee. The change came amongst a series of C-suite changes at the company, including the departure of CFO Julie Brown and the appointment of Jonathan Akeroyd as new CEO. Lee was announced as the Chief Creative Officer of Burberry in September 2022 and his debut for Burberry was its Autumn / Winter 2023 collection. Under the creative leadership of Lee, the brand revealed their latest campaign along with a new, revised logo of the Equestrian Knight from 1901. Speaking about his debut collection, Lee said: "It was exciting to try to find the narrative of Burberry. And I wanted to go back to the idea of functionality, men and women on the go, and clothes that will last, that are not too precious."

== Personal life ==
As of 2025, Lee is in a relationship with the ballet dancer Roberto Bolle. The couple live in London. They were first seen together in Venice in 2019.

== Awards ==
- 2019: four Fashion Awards (Brand of the Year, Womenswear Designer of the Year, Accessories Designer of the Year, and Designer of the Year)
