= La Scala Theatre Ballet School =

Coordinates: 45.4675°N 9.1895°E

- Scuola di Ballo del Teatro alla Scala
- Official logo of the La Scala Academy

Location
- Via Campo Lodigiano; Milan; Italy

Information
- Founded: 1813
- Director of Dance: Frédéric Olivieri
- Affiliation: La Scala Theatre Ballet
- Specialism: Classical Ballet
- Website: www.accademialascala.it

La Scala Theatre Ballet School (Italian: Scuola di Ballo del Teatro alla Scala) is one of the leading classical ballet schools in the world and is the associate school of La Scala Theatre Ballet, an international ballet company based at La Scala in Milan, Italy. The school forms part of the theatre's Academy for Performing Arts.

== History ==
The ballet school was founded in 1813 by Benedetto Ricci, as the Accademia di ballo (dance academy) of the Teatro alla Scala.

Following the defeat of Napoleon, the school's name was changed to Imperial Regia Accademia di Ballo del Teatro alla Scala (Royal Imperial Dance Academy of the Teatro alla Scala).

For many years after its foundation the school offered two courses, of the total duration of eight years; the first consisted in apprenticeship, the second of specialization studies. The classes were accompanied by a violinist.

Many famous dancers have been directors of the school. Among them, the famous Carlo Blasis, who joined the school in 1838 and directed it for 15 years, and the Italian ballerina Caterina Beretta, who was the school director from 1905 to 1908.

Because of the first world War, the school was closed down in 1917; it was later reopened (in 1921) thanks to the interest of Arturo Toscanini. The famous Russian ballet dancer Olga Preobrajenska was appointed as the new school director.

Enrico Cecchetti was director of the school until his death on November 13, 1928. He died whilst teaching. Following his recommendation, Cia Fornaroli, grande prima ballerina of the Theatre La Scala, was appointed as the school new director. She directed the school until 1932, when Ettorina Mazzucchelli took her place as the school director.

Esmée Bulnes directed the school until 1967, followed by Elide Bonagiunta (until 1972). The next school director was John Field, former director of the Royal Ballet of London and former director of the Corpo di Ballo del Teatro alla Scala (the Theater's resident company). John Field left the school in July 1974; his place was taken by Anna Maria Prina, former student of the school and then soloist of the Corpo di Ballo del Teatro alla Scala. Current director of the dance department of the academy is Frédéric Olivieri.

In 1998 the school was moved to a new dedicated building, in via Campo Lodigiano.

== Dance curriculum ==
The school typically accepts students 8 years old and older. From 1999, the school also offers predance classes to children aged between six and ten. In the same year, the school has introduced modern and contemporary dance classes, in addition to the more traditional classical ballet classes. Students are evaluated in both disciplines (classical ballet and contemporary ballet) in order to achieve the Diploma awarded by the school.

The school is now organized in two parts: in the first, which lasts five years, the students follow classes common to the two specializations; in the second, which lasts three years, the students choose a specialization (classical or modern dance).

The method currently taught at the school is based on the Italian method; the Russian, French and English ballet methods are also taught as part of the pupils' curricula. Recently, the school has also started classes of American style and technique. The curriculum includes ballet technique, pointe classes, pas de deux and classical repertoire. The students also learn contemporary and modern technique (Limon, Graham and Cunningham techniques). Many of the school pupils also participate to production held at the Teatro alla Scala with the Corpo di Ballo del Teatro alla Scala, the theater's resident company. All students also attend regular school classes, organized for them by the city of Milan.

== Faculty ==
At this date, the faculty is composed of: Loreta Alexandrescu, Amelia Colombini, Vera Karpenko, Tatiana Nikonova, Leonid Nikonov, Paolo Podini.

The classes of modern/contemporary dance are taught by Emanuela Tagliavia. Girls' repertoire classes are currently taught by Vera Karpernko and Amelia Colombini; the male classes and pas de deux are taught by Leonid Nikonov and Paolo Podini.

Character dance is taught by Loreta Alexandrescu, and Spanish dance by Franca Roberto. The students also attend history of dance and history of ballet classes (Francesca Pedroni). Music classes are taught by Fabio Sartorelli and Alessandro Pontremoli.

== Famous school graduates ==
Many of the school students have achieved international fame. Among them: Attilia Radice, Giuseppina Morlacchi, Teresa Legnani, Cia Fornaroli, Ettorina Mazzucchelli, Nives Poli, Edda Martignoni, Bianca Gallizia, Giuliana Penzi and Elide Bonagiunta.

In more recent times, famous dancers who have studied at the school are: Carla Fracci, Luciana Savignano, Liliana Cosi, Oriella Dorella, Paola Cantalupo, Marco Pierin, Massimo Murru, Carlotta Zamparo, Sabrina Brazzo, Gilda Gelati, Marta Romagna, Roberto Bolle, and Alessio Carbone.

Many other dancers have started their dance instruction at the school, such as the famous ballerina Alessandra Ferri.
