= Isaac Sinclair (perfumer) =

Isaac Sinclair (born c. 1980) is a perfumer from Auckland, New Zealand. He currently resides in São Paulo, Brazil, where he works as a Master Perfumer for international flavours and fragrance company Symrise. Sinclair is one of the youngest Master Perfumers active today.

== Education ==
He studied at Università dell'Immagine (School of Five Senses) in Milan, Italy, majoring in Olfactive studies before apprenticing at Symrise in Paris.

== Creation ==
In addition to working on major accounts for Guerlain, DKNY, Natura, and Lancôme, Sinclair also works on smaller projects such as niche perfume house Abel, and candle company Ecoya.
