= Maria Cumani Quasimodo =

Italian actress and dancer (1908–1995)

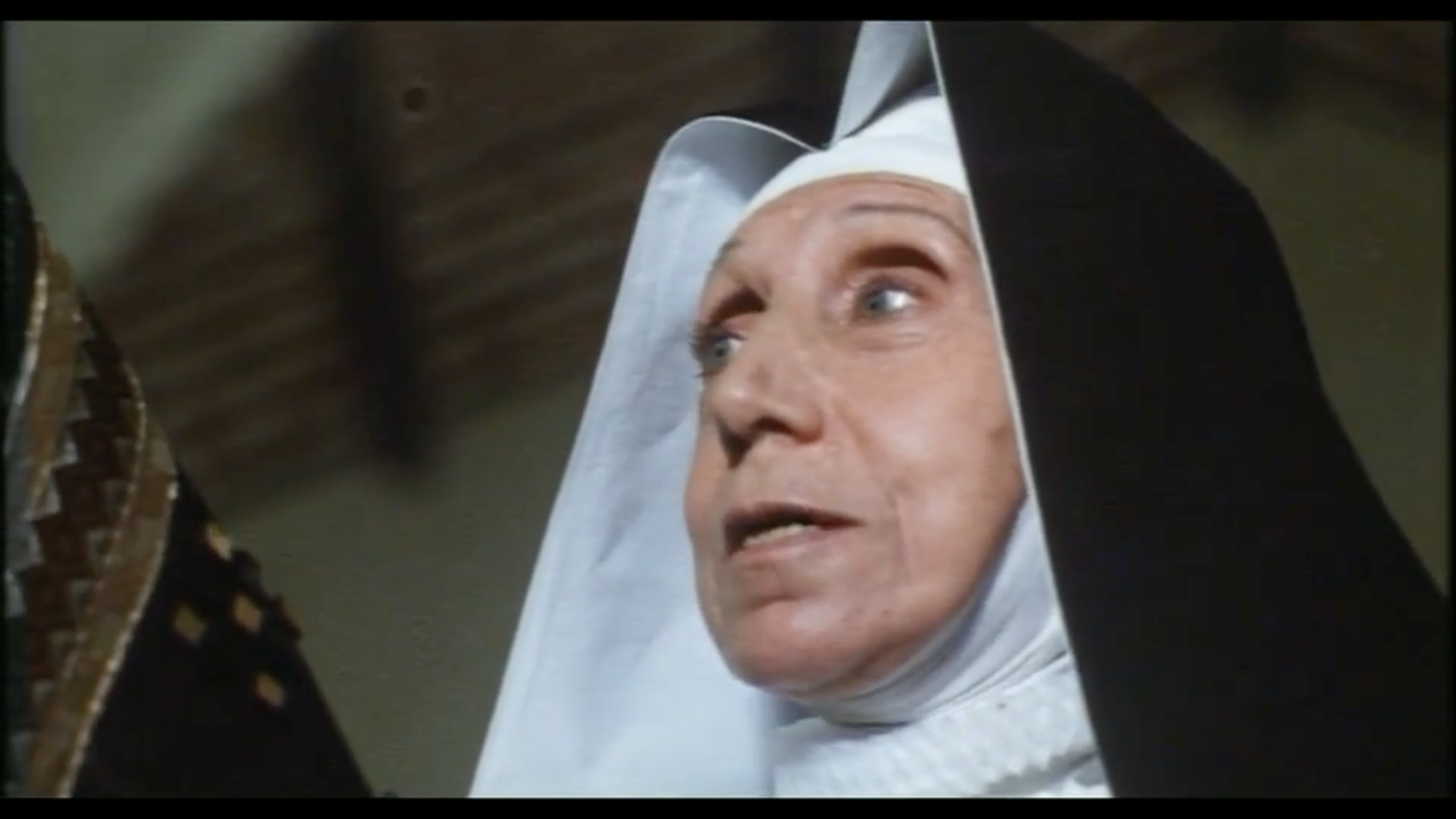
- Born: Maria Clementina Cumani; 20 May 1908; Milan, Italy
- Died: 22 November 1995 (aged 87); Milan, Italy
- Occupation: Actress

Maria Cumani Quasimodo (20 May 1908 – 22 November 1995) was an Italian actress and dancer.

Born Maria Clementina Cumani in Milan, she studied dance under Jia Ruskaja. In 1936, she became the companion of the poet Salvatore Quasimodo, with whom she had a son, Alessandro. In 1937, she made her professional debut as a dancer, and shortly later she specialized in "poetic dance", a personal style in which dance was combined with poetic verses. She was married to Quasimodo from 1948 to 1960. In the meanwhile, Cumani Quasimodo started a double career as a choreographer and a stage and film character actress. Shortly before her death, she released an autobiography, L'arte del silenzio, which particularly focuses on her years alongside Salvatore Quasimodo.

== Filmography ==
Year	Title	Role	Notes
1964	Shivers in Summer	Giulia	Uncredited
1965	Juliet of the Spirits	Woman at Bhishma's Sitting	Uncredited
1966	Pardon, Are You For or Against?	Baronessa Cornianu	
1967	The Subversives	Ludovico's mother	
1967	Play-Boy	Baroness	
1968	La notte è fatta per... rubare	Olga	
1968	Ballad of a Bounty Hunter		
1968	Galileo		
1969	The Laughing Woman	Sayer's Secretary	
1969	Medea		Uncredited
1971	Veruschka		
1972	All the Colors of the Dark	Elderly Neighbor	
1972	Pulp	Office Manageress	
1973	The Nun and the Devil	Lavinia	
1973	Bella, ricca, lieve difetto fisico, cerca anima gemella		
1973	Cuore		
1974	All Screwed Up	Owner of restaurant	
1974	Prigione di donne	Ursula - the Mother Superior	
1974	Il tempo dell'inizio	Maitresse	
1974	Five Women for the Killer	Marta	
1974	Two Missionaries	Marchesa Gonzaga	
1975	Wanted: Babysitter	Princess Ruspini	Uncredited
1978	Interno di un convento		
1978	L'inquilina del piano di sopra		
1979	Caligula	Priestess of Isis	Uncredited
1983	Nostalghia		
1984	Dance music		
1984	She	Moona	
1988	Vampire in Venice	Princess	
1994	Aquero	Isadora	(final film role)
