= Bravura =

Style intended to show off performer's skill

In classical music, a bravura is a style of both music and its performance intended to show off the skill of a performer. Commonly, it is a virtuosic passage performed as a solo, and often in a cadenza.

The term implies "effect for effect's sake", therefore, while many pieces of Beethoven do require a high skill level to perform, they are not described as "bravura". John Alexander Fuller-Maitland suggests the following arias as examples of bravura: "Let the bright Seraphim" from Handel’s Samson, "Der Hölle Rache kocht in meinem Herzen" (Act II of Mozart’s The Magic Flute) and "Non più mesta" from Rossini’s La Cenerentola.

Musical terms like "Allegro di bravura" and "con bravura" indicate that a musical segment or piece is to be performed with boldness, fire, and brilliance.

The term "bravura" also refers to daring performance in ballet, e.g., in reference of the pas de deux from Le Corsaire. Lynn Garafola describes the Russian ballet school of Marius Petipa as "marrying the new Italian bravura technique to its more lyrical French counterpart".
