= Giuliana Penzi =

- Born: October 1, 1918; Ravenna, Italy
- Died: January 17, 2008 (aged 90); Rome, Italy

Giuliana Penzi (October 1, 1918, in Ravenna – January 17, 2008, in Rome) was an Italian dancer and choreographer who was a Guest Ballerina at the Rome Opera House and the director of the Accademia nazionale di danza. She trained at La Scala ballet school in Milan and shortly after her graduation, along with Russian émigrée Jia Ruskaja, co-founded the Rome Academy in 1940.
