= Classical ballet =

Traditional, formal style of ballet

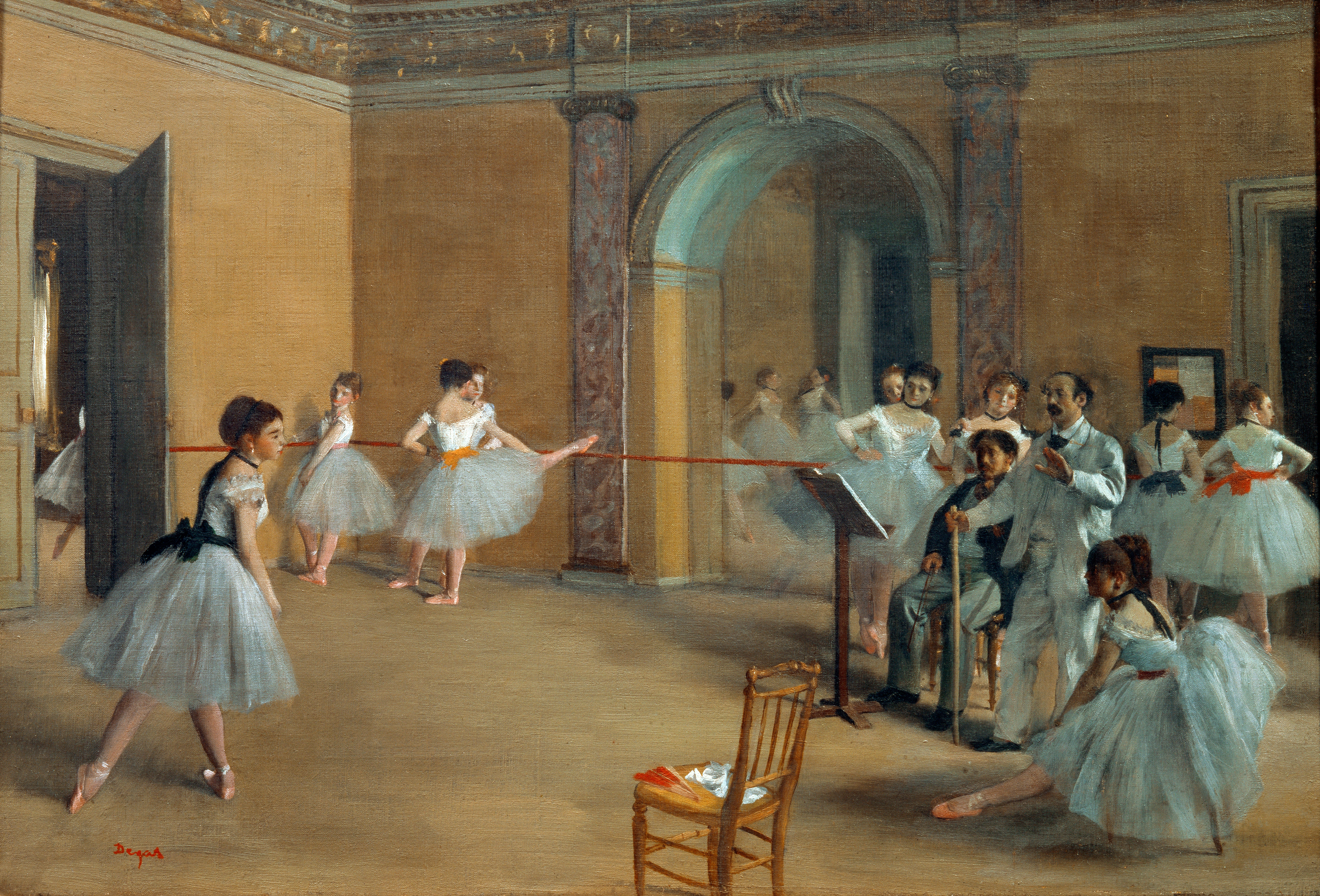
Painting of ballet dancers by Edgar Degas, 1872

Classical ballet is any of the traditional, formal styles of ballet that exclusively employ classical ballet technique. It is known for its aesthetics and rigorous technique (such as pointe work, turnout of the legs, and high extensions), its flowing, precise movements, and its ethereal qualities.

There are stylistic variations related to an area or origin, which are denoted by classifications such as Russian ballet, French ballet, British ballet and Italian ballet. For example, Russian ballet features high extensions and dynamic turns, whereas Italian ballet tends to be more grounded, with a focus on fast, intricate footwork. Many of the stylistic variations are associated with specific training methods that have been named after their originators. Despite these variations, the performance and vocabulary of classical ballet are largely consistent throughout the world.

== History ==
Ballet originated in the Italian Renaissance courts and was brought to France by Catherine de' Medici in the 16th century. During ballet's infancy, court ballets were performed by aristocratic amateurs rather than professional dancers. Most of ballet's early movements evolved from social court dances and prominently featured stage patterns rather than formal ballet technique.

In the 17th century, as ballet's popularity in France increased, ballet began to gradually transform into a professional art. It was no longer performed by amateurs, but instead ballet performances started to incorporate challenging acrobatic movements that could only be performed by highly skilled street entertainers. In response, the world's first ballet school, the Académie Royale de Danse, was established by King Louis XIV in 1661. The Academie's purpose was to improve the quality of dance training in France and to invent a technique or curriculum that could be used to transform ballet into a formal discipline. Shortly after the Academie was formed, in 1672, King Louis XIV established a performing company called the Academie Royal de Musique de Dance (today known as Paris Opera), and named Pierre Beauchamp the head dancing-master. While at the Academie Royal, Beauchamp revolutionized ballet technique by inventing the five positions (first, second, third, fourth and fifth) of ballet, which to this day remain the foundation of all formal classical ballet technique.

=== Famous dancers in history ===
- Anna Pavlova: 12 February 1881 – 23 January 1931
- Dame Margot Fonteyn: 18 May 1919 – 21 February 1991
- Rudolf Nureyev: 17 March 1938 – 6 January 1993

== Development ==
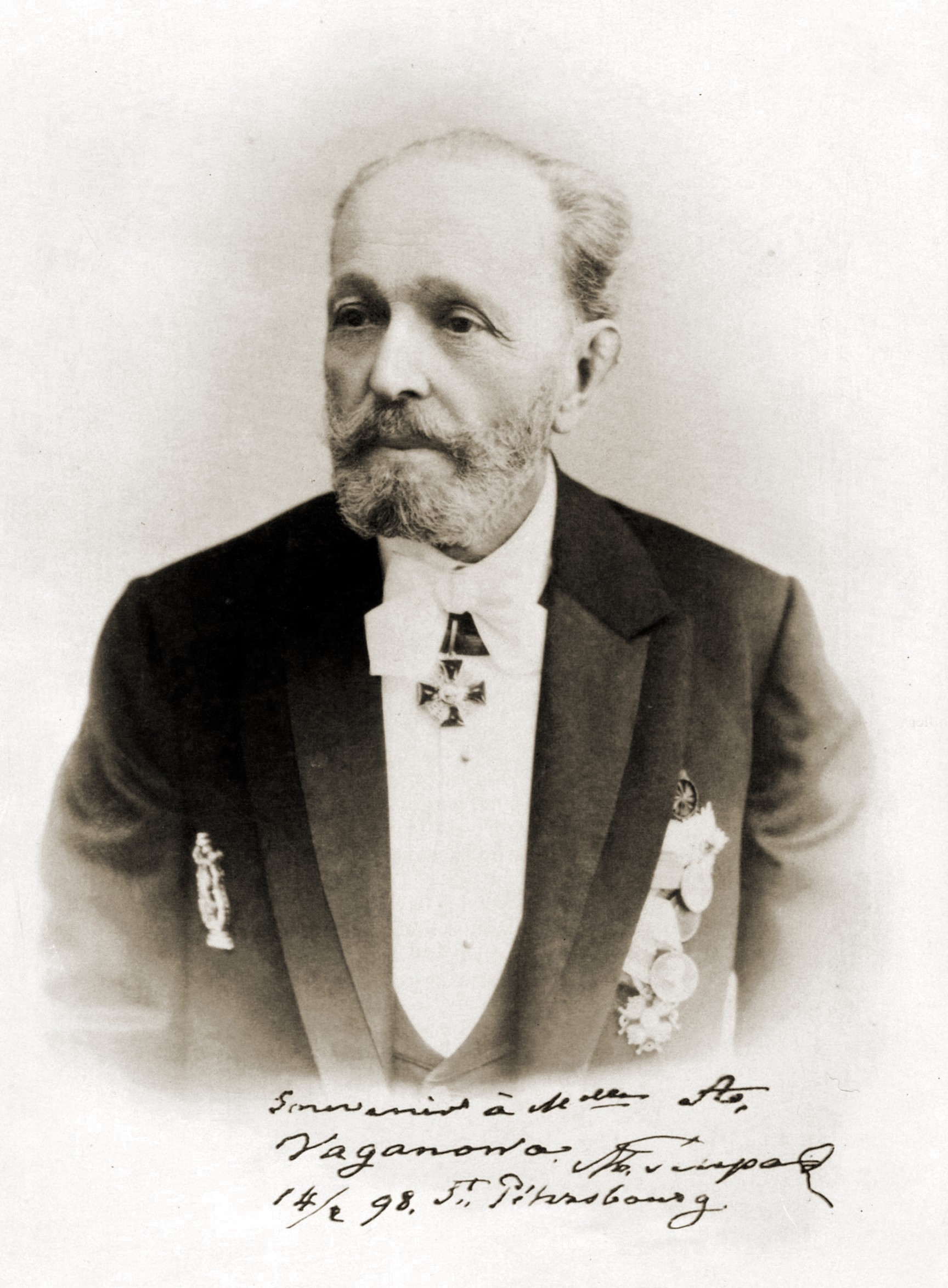
Marius Ivanovich Petipa, February 14, 1898

Before classical ballet developed, ballet was in a period referred to as the Romantic era. Romantic ballet was known for its storytelling, and often held a softer aesthetic. Classical ballet came to be when a ballet master by the name of Marius Petipa (who is considered to be one of the greatest choreographers of all time) took Romantic ballet and combined it with different aspects of Russian ballet technique (as Petipa was once a choreographer and ballet master at Mariinsky Ballet). Elements pulled from these things include the storytelling found in Romantic ballet, and the athleticism of Russian technique. Therefore, a new era of ballet, which later became known as the classical era, began. Even though he was responsible for bringing in the classical ballet era, Petipa was also responsible for choreographing well-known romantic ballets such as Giselle.

During the classical era, Marius Petipa was largely responsible for creating choreographic structures that are still used in ballets today. For one, Petipa was the first to use the grand pas de deux in his choreography. Additionally, he cemented the usage of the corps de ballet as a standard part of a ballet. Despite his ushering in of the classical era, these elements can be seen in his romantic ballets as well.

=== Famous classical ballets ===
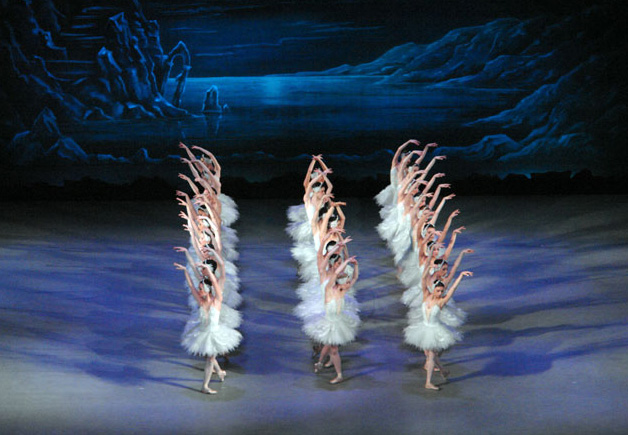
Dancers performing Swan Lake

- Don Quixote: choreographed by Marius Petipa
- Swan Lake: choreographed by Marius Petipa and Lev Ivanov
- The Nutcracker: choreographed by Marius Petipa and Lev Ivanov

== Technique ==
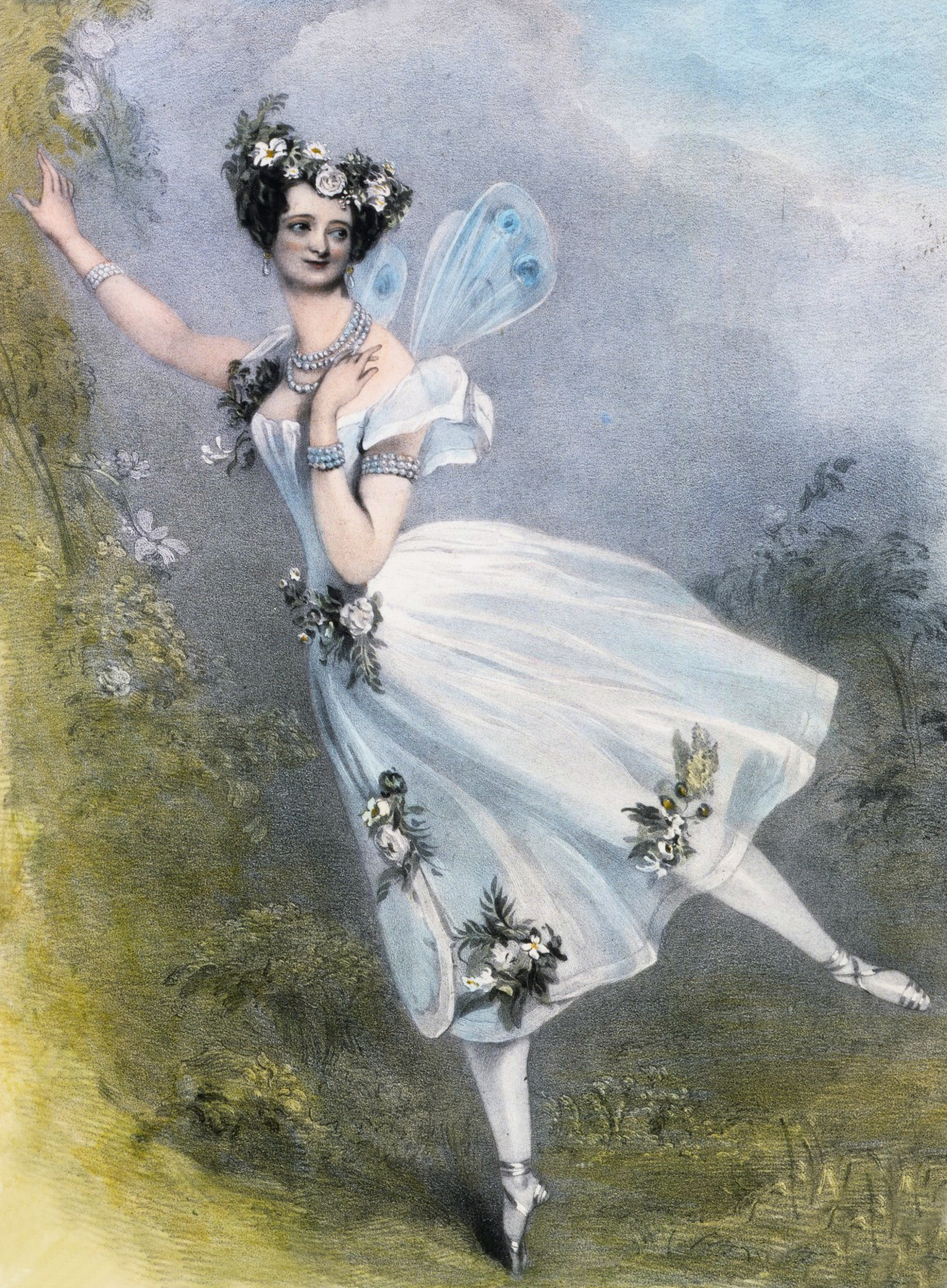
Marie Taglioni, a pioneer of pointe work

Ballet technique is the foundational principles of body movement and form used in ballet. A distinctive feature of ballet technique is turnout; which is the outward rotation of the legs and feet emanating from the hip. This was first introduced into ballet by King Louis XIV because he loved to show off the shiny buckles on his shoes when he performed his own dances. There are five fundamental positions of the feet in ballet, all performed with turnout and named numerically as first through fifth positions. When performing jumps and leaps, classical ballet dancers strive to exhibit ballon, the appearance of briefly floating in the air. Pointe technique is the part of ballet technique that concerns pointe work, in which a ballet dancer supports all body weight on the tips of fully extended feet on specially designed and handcrafted pointe shoes. In professional companies, the shoes are made to fit the dancers' feet perfectly.

== Training ==
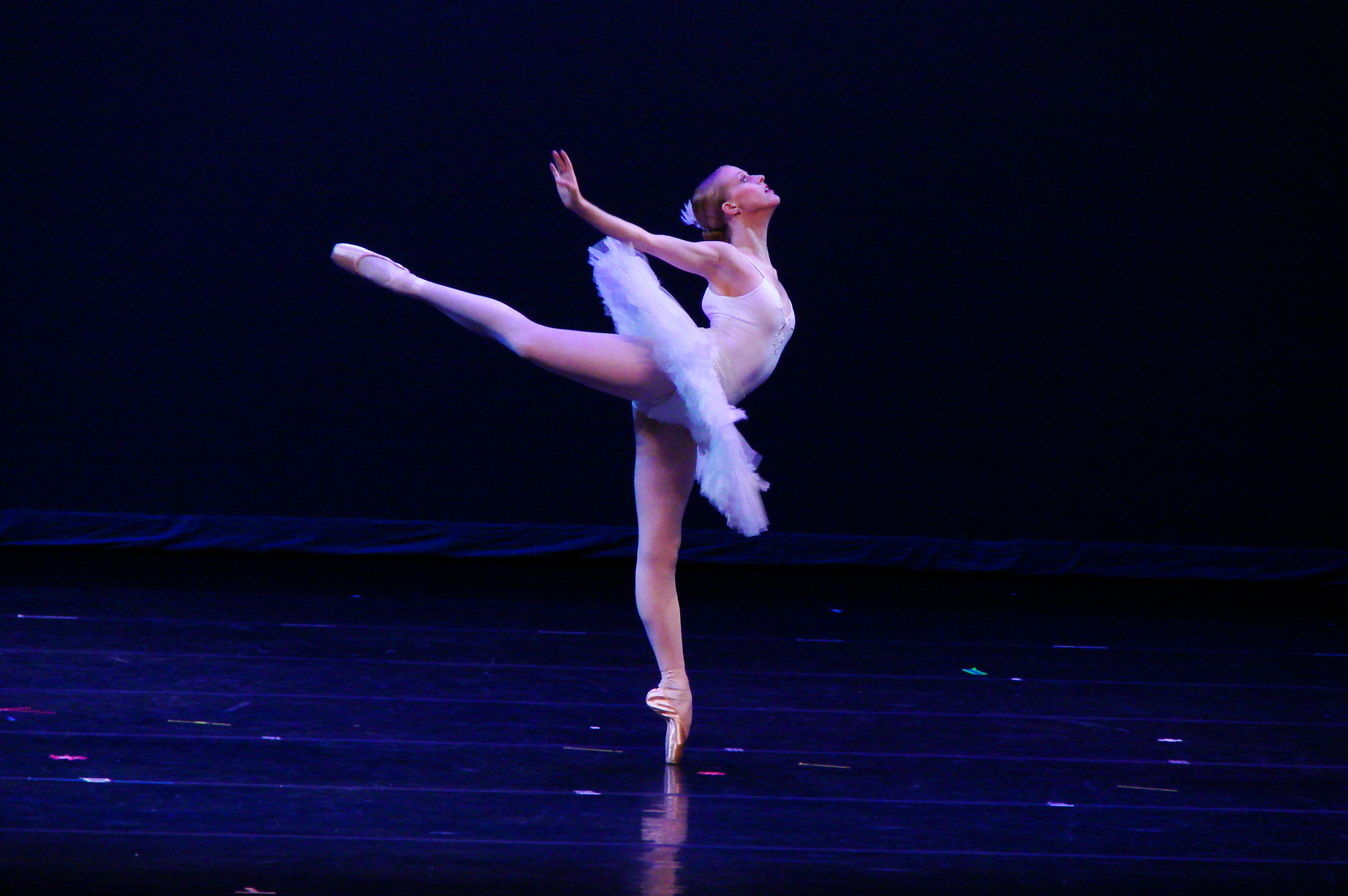
Ballerina dancing en pointe

Students typically learn ballet terminology and the pronunciation, meaning, and precise body form and movement associated with each term. Emphasis is placed on developing flexibility and strengthening the legs, feet, and body core (the center, or abdominals) as a strong core is essential for turns and many other ballet movements. Dancers also learn to use their spot which teaches them to focus on something while turning so as not to become dizzy.

Early ballet training for all dancers involves basic technique and develops strength and flexibility. As they progress, female dancers begin to learn pointe technique and both male and female dancers begin to learn partnering and more advanced jumps and turns. As the men get stronger, lifts are added to the partnering. Depending on the teacher and training system, students may progress through various stages or levels of training as their skills advance.

=== Music for ballet class ===
The traditional ballet masters of the eighteenth century played the violin for their own ballet classes. They also provided their ballet students with instruction in the relationship between the dance steps and the music. By the end of the nineteenth century this had fallen out of fashion, and specialisation in the performing arts meant that the role of the ballet teacher and the ballet musician had become separate professions. By the twentieth century, the violin had given way to the piano as the standard accompaniment for ballet class. When recorded music is substituted for a live musician, there is no opportunity for the dancers to make subtle physical shifts of expression that a live dance accompanist will watch and match as they play.

The live musician in a ballet class plays a crucial role in the creative process. As the ballet teacher sets an exercise - moving, counting, vocalising - the musician observes and imagines the music that will best support the exercise. The musician then plays either an existing piece of musical repertoire or creates a musical improvisation to support the dancers in the exercise. The dancers are affected by the musician's choices, and they integrate both the ballet teacher's steps and the ballet musician's music into their performance. Ultimately, the ballet teacher has little control over the musical portion of their lesson unless they ask the musician to play a specific piece of music. For this reason, the working relationship between a dance teacher and a dance musician is vital to the success of a ballet class.

=== Ballet class attire ===
Female attire typically includes pink or flesh colored tights, a leotard, and sometimes a short wrap-skirt, or a skirted leotard and sometimes legwarmers depending on the season. Males typically wear black or dark tights, a form-fitting white, or black, shirt or leotard worn under the tights, and a dance belt beneath the outer dancewear to provide support. In some cases, students may wear a unitard — a one-piece garment that combines tights and a leotard — to enhance the visibility of artistic lines.

All dancers wear soft ballet shoes (sometimes called flats). Typically, female dancers wear pink or beige shoes and men wear black or white shoes. Leg warmers are sometimes worn during the early part of a class to protect leg muscles until they become warm. Females are usually required to tie their hair in a bun or some other hair style that exposes the neck that is not a ponytail. The customary attire and hair style are intended to promote freedom of movement and to reveal body form so that the teacher can evaluate dancers' alignment and technique. After warming up, advanced female students may wear pointe shoes whereas advanced male students continue to wear soft shoes. Pointe shoes are worn after the student is deemed strong enough in the ankles and can execute the routine to a high standard, usually around or after the age of 12, or after the dancers' feet have stopped developing, so as to protect the dancers' feet from injury common with premature wearing.

=== Methods ===
There are several standardized, widespread, classical ballet training systems, each designed to produce a unique aesthetic quality from its students. Some systems are named after their creators; these are typically called methods or schools. For example, two prevailing systems from Russia are the Vaganova method (created by Agrippina Vaganova) and the Legat Method (by Nikolai Legat). The Cecchetti method is named after Italian dancer Enrico Cecchetti. Another training system was developed by and named after August Bournonville; this is taught primarily in Denmark. The Royal Academy of Dance (RAD) method was not created by an individual, but by a group of notable ballet professionals. Despite their associations with geographically named ballet styles, many of these training methods are used worldwide. For example, the RAD teaching method is used in more than 70 countries.

American-style ballet (Balanchine) is not taught by means of a standardized, widespread training system. Similarly, French ballet has no standard training system; each of the major French-style ballet schools, such as the Paris Opera Ballet School, Conservatoire National Supérieur de Musique et de Danse, and Académie de Danse Classique Princesse Grace (Monaco) employs a unique training system.

Widely used ballet training systems
Ballet style	Training system	
Ballet style	Name	Creator
Danish ballet	Bournonville method	August Bournonville
Spanish ballet	Spanish & Classical	Antonio Ruiz Soler
Italian ballet	Cecchetti method	Enrico Cecchetti
Russian ballet	Vaganova method	Agrippina Vaganova
Russian ballet	Legat Method	Nikolai Legat
English ballet	The Royal Ballet School Royal Academy of Dance	Various
French ballet	Ballet Opera De Paris School	
American ballet (Balanchine)	Balanchine method (School of American Ballet)	George Balanchine

==== Stage reference points ====
Some classical ballet training systems employ standardized layouts to define reference locations at the corners, and edges of stages, and dance studio rooms. In the latter case, there is no audience and a mirror typically spans the downstage wall of the room (e.g., points 1-2 of the Cecchetti layout).

Stage layouts used in ballet training systems
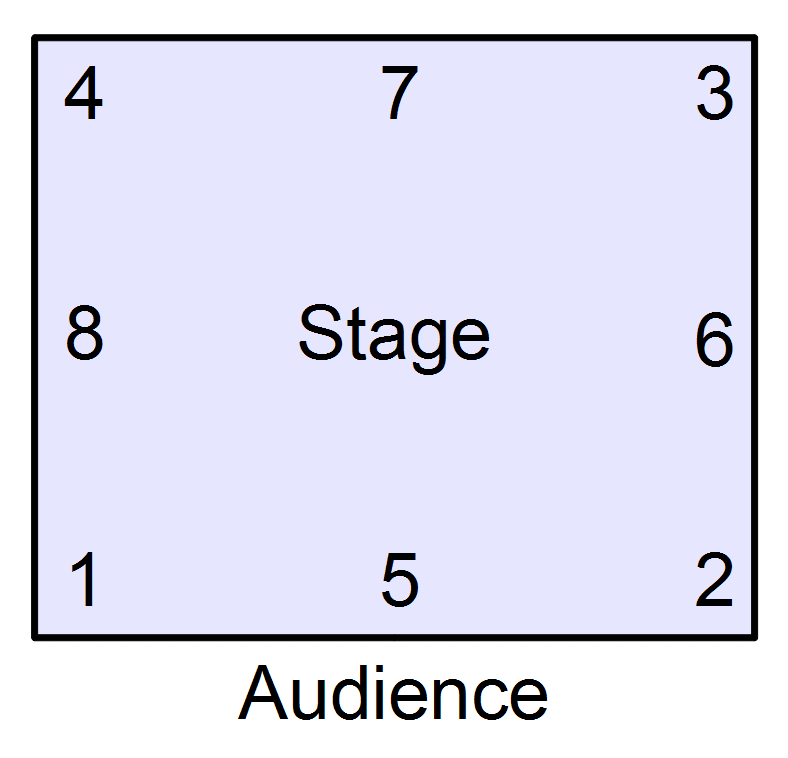
Cecchetti stage layout

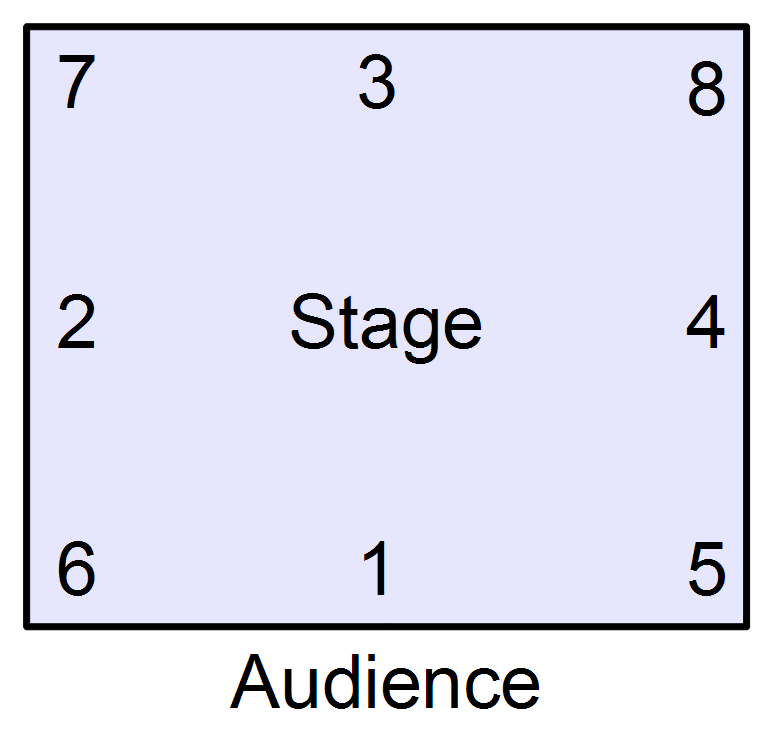
RAD stage layout

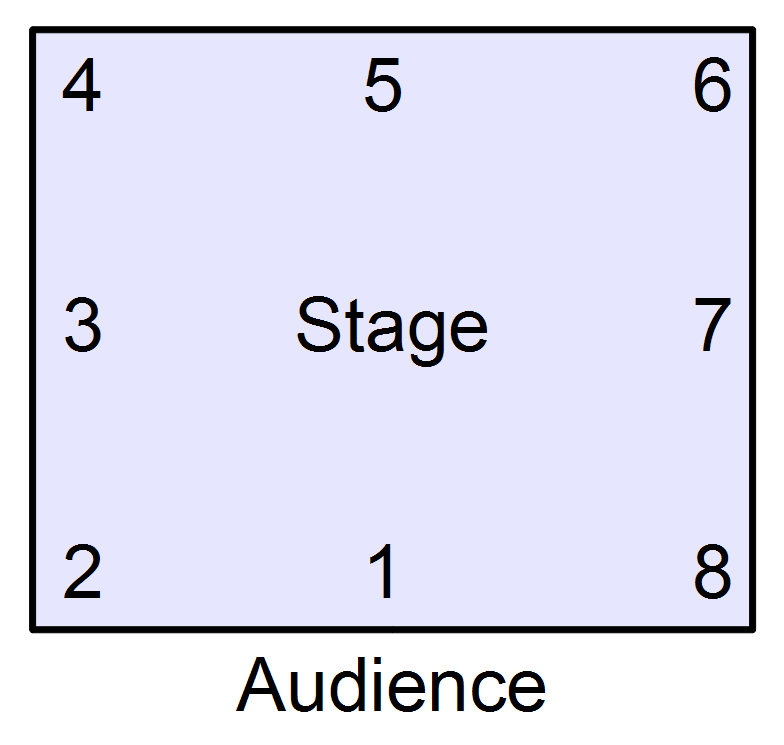
Vaganova stage layout

== See also ==
- Contemporary ballet
- Neoclassical ballet
- Glossary of ballet
