= Pierina Legnani =

Italian ballerina (1863–1930)

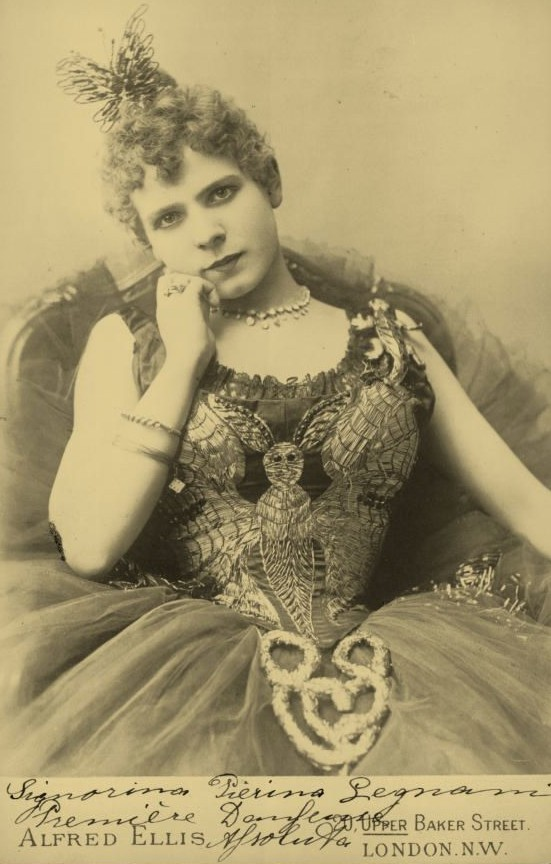
- Pierina Legnani photographed during her tour of London, 1891. Written on the photo is "Signorina Pierina Legnani, Première danseuse assoluta".
- Born: Pierina Legnani; 30 September 1863; Milan, Kingdom of Italy
- Died: 15 November 1930 (aged 67); Milan, Kingdom of Italy

Pierina Legnani (30 September 1863 – 15 November 1930) was an Italian ballerina considered one of the greatest ballerinas of all time.

== Biography ==
Legnani was born in 1863 in Milan and originally studied with the famous ballet dancer Caterina Beretta at La Scala, where she developed her technical expertise. Her professional career took off when she appeared as prima ballerina in the Casati ballet Salandra at the Alhambra Theatre in London. She was accorded the title prima ballerina for La Scala in 1892, before moving to St Petersburg in 1892, where she reached fame dancing with the Imperial Ballet at the Maryinsky Theatre until 1901.

Under the direction of famous ballet choreographer Marius Petipa, Legnani originated numerous roles, including: Cinderella in 1893, Swan Lake in 1895, Raymonda in 1898, and La Camargo in 1901. She is widely reputed to be the first ballerina to perform 32 fouettés en tournant in the coda of the Grand Pas d'action of the ballet Cinderella. The execution of 32 turns on pointe is a bravura achievement emphasizing the dancer's strength and technique. A sequence of 32 fouetté turns was later choreographed into the Black Swan solo in act 3 of Swan Lake and is still used to this day. Legnani was one of only two ballet dancers appointed prima ballerina assoluta at the Maryinsky Theatre.

Her final performance was in the Minkus/Petipa ballet La Camargo on 28 January 1901, after which she retired to live in her villa at Lake Como.

After retiring from the stage, she lived in Italy and served on the examining board of La Scala Ballet School until four months before her death. She died on 15 November 1930, aged 67.

== Repertoire ==
Ballets of Marius Petipa featuring Pierina Legnani:

- Cinderella from Petipa/Ivanov/Cecchetti (music by Fitingof-Shell, 1893), Legnani was the first to establish 32 fouettés en tournant.
- The Talisman (music by Riccardo Drigo, 1895)
- La Perle (music by Drigo, 1896)
- Raymonda (music by Alexander Glazunov, 1898)
- Les ruses d’amour (music by Glazunov)
- Coppélia (version from Petipa/Cecchetti, music by Léo Delibes, 1896)
- The Cavalry Halt (music by Johann Armsheimer, 1896)

== Gallery ==
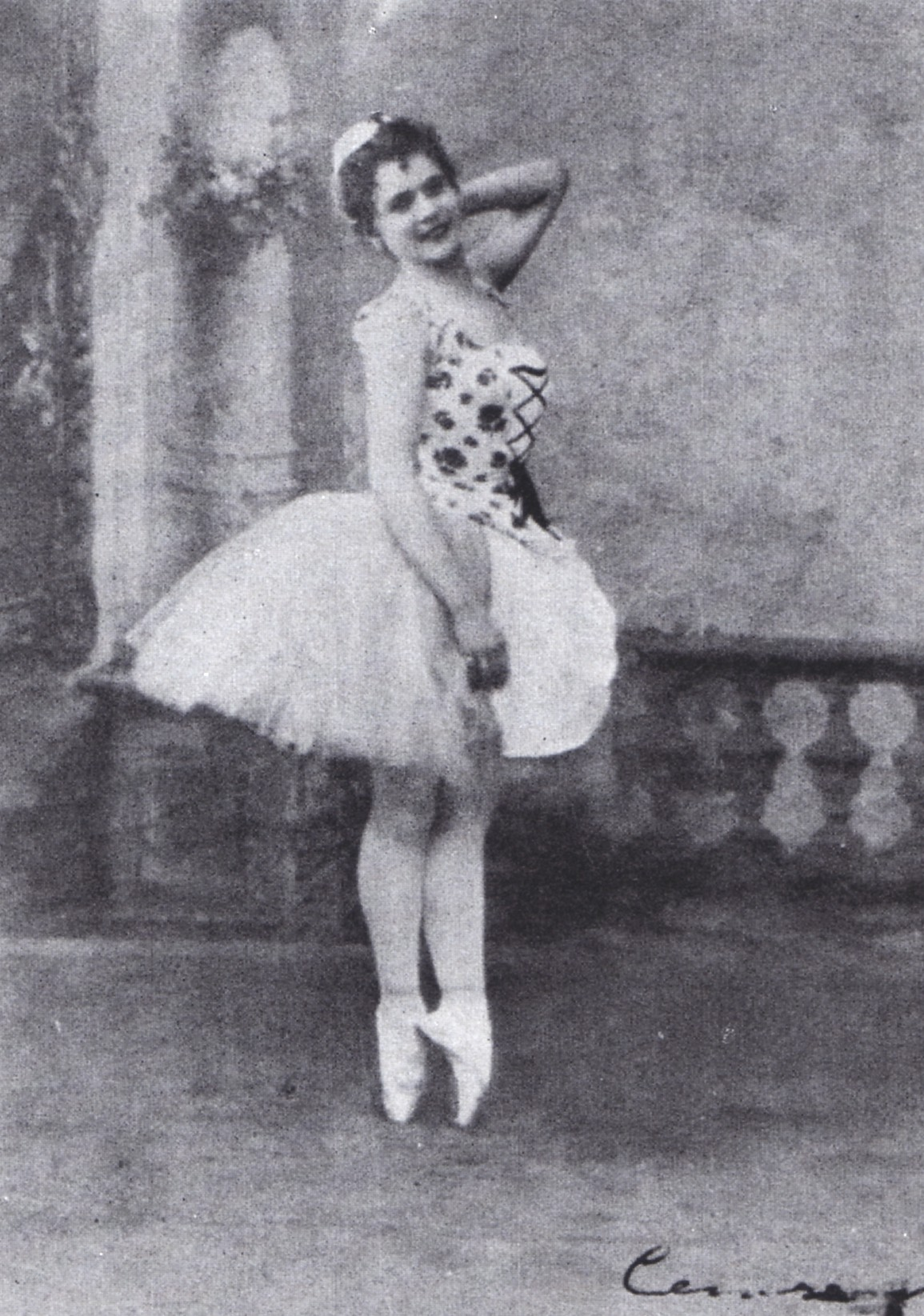
Legnani in the title role of Cinderella. St. Petersburg, 1893.

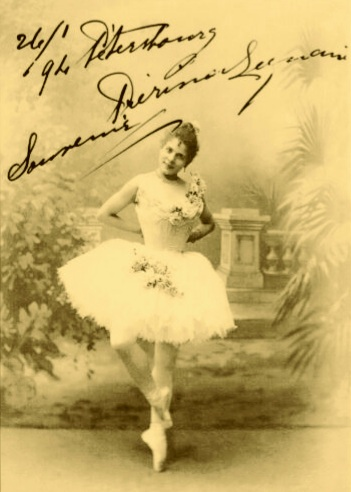
Legnani in the title of Cinderella. St. Petersburg, 1893.

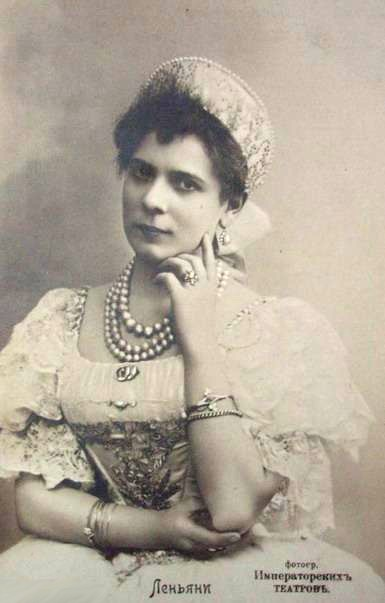
Legnani as the Tsar Maiden in Petipa's revival of The Little Humpbacked Horse. St Petersburg, 1895.

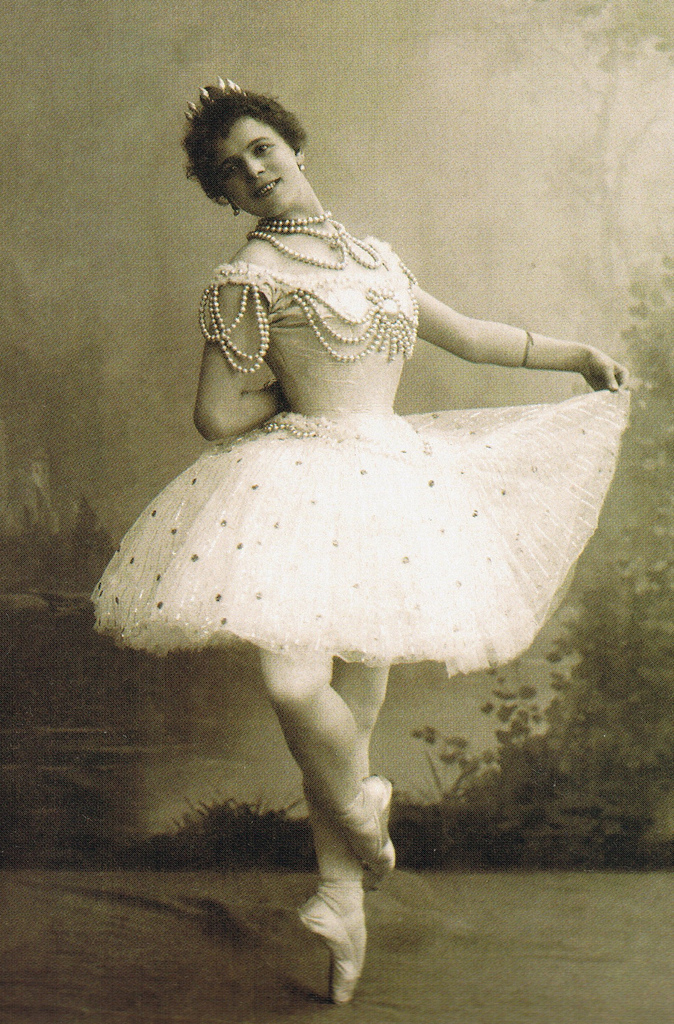
Legnani as the White Pearl in La Perle, a ballet created for the coronation of Nicholas II. Moscow, 1896.

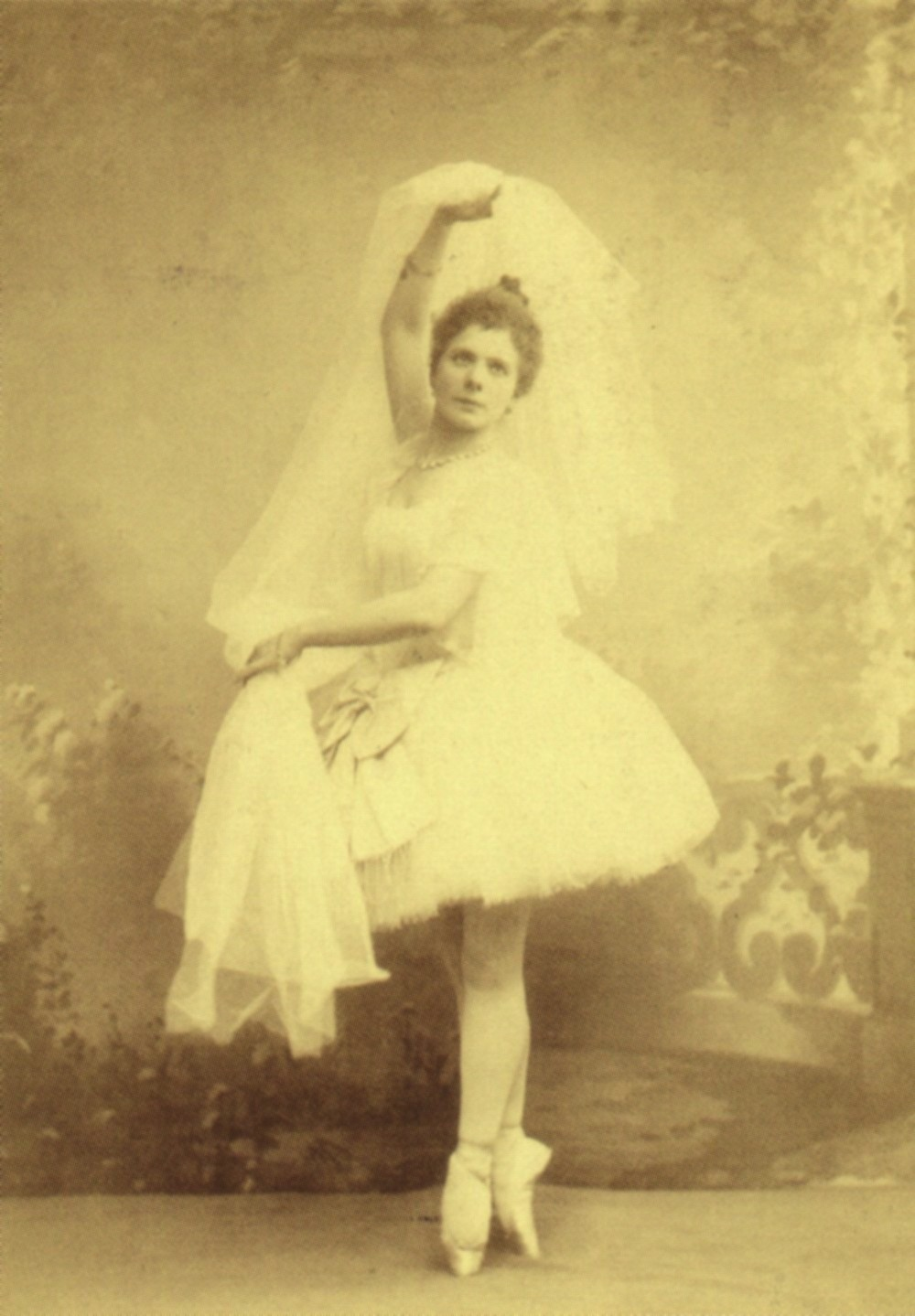
Legnani in the title role of Raymonda. St. Petersburg, 1898.

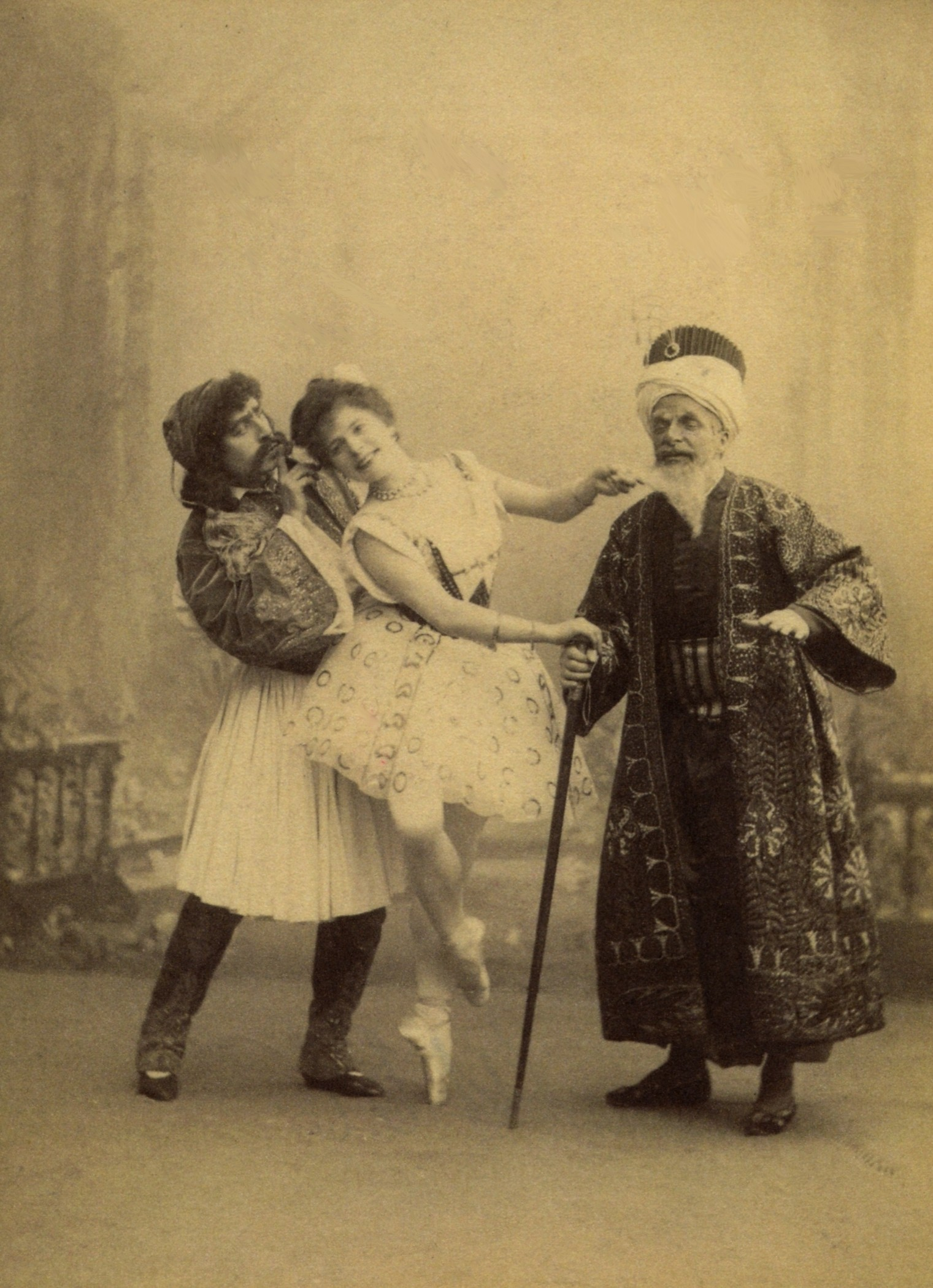
Legnani as Medora in Petipa's final revival of Le Corsaire, with Pavel Gerdt as Conrad (left) and Alfred Bekefi as the Saïd Pasha (right). St. Petersburg, 1899.

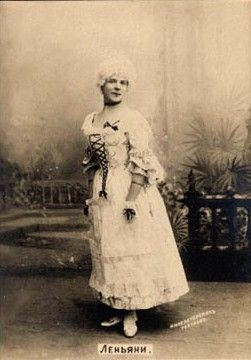
Legnani in the title role of La Camargo, revived by Lev Ivanov. St. Petersburg, 1901.

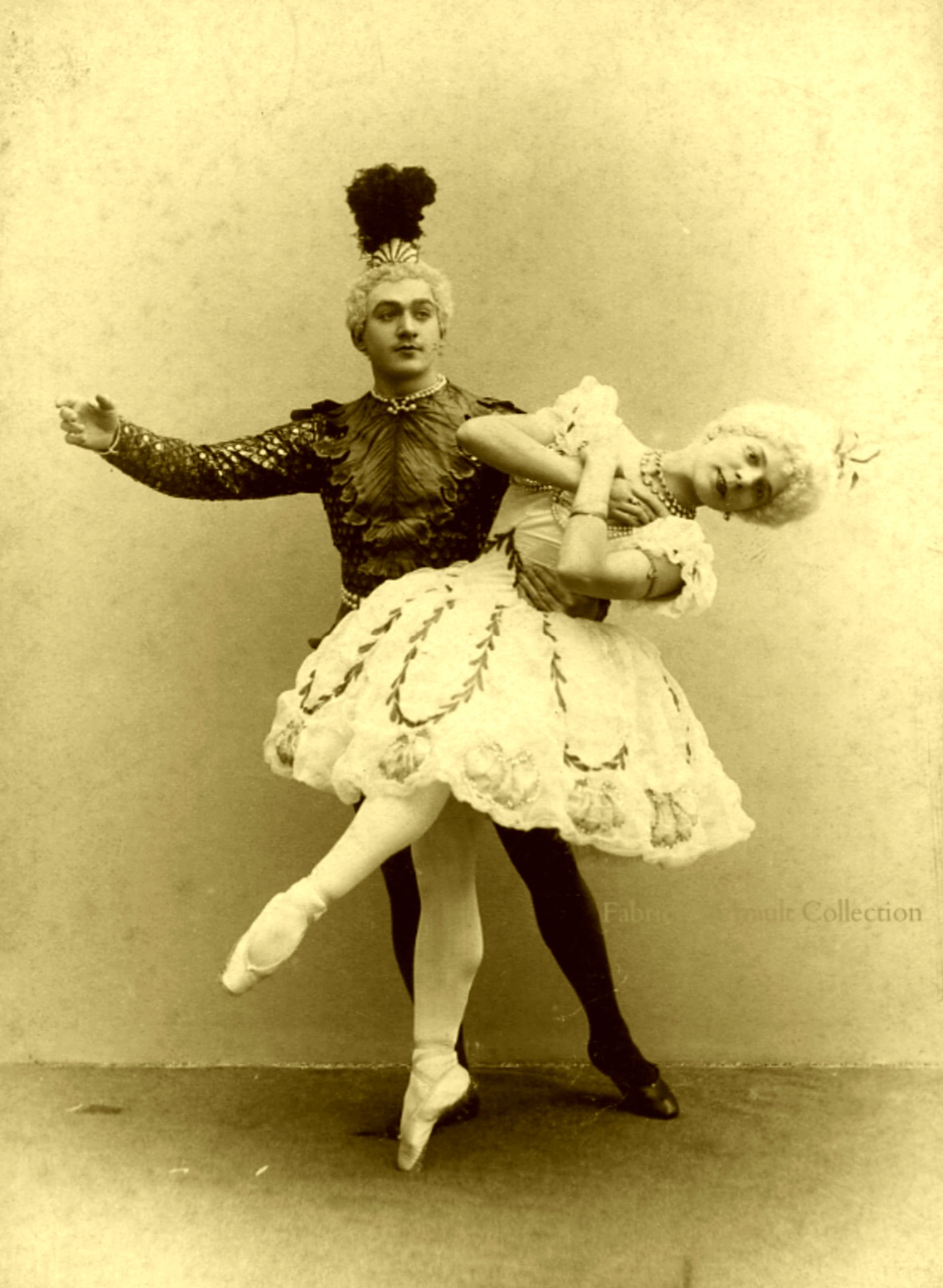
Legnani in the title role of La Camargo with Nikolai Legat as Vestris. St. Petersburg, 1901
