= Alessandra Ferri =

Italian prima ballerina (born 1963)

Alessandra Ferri OMRI
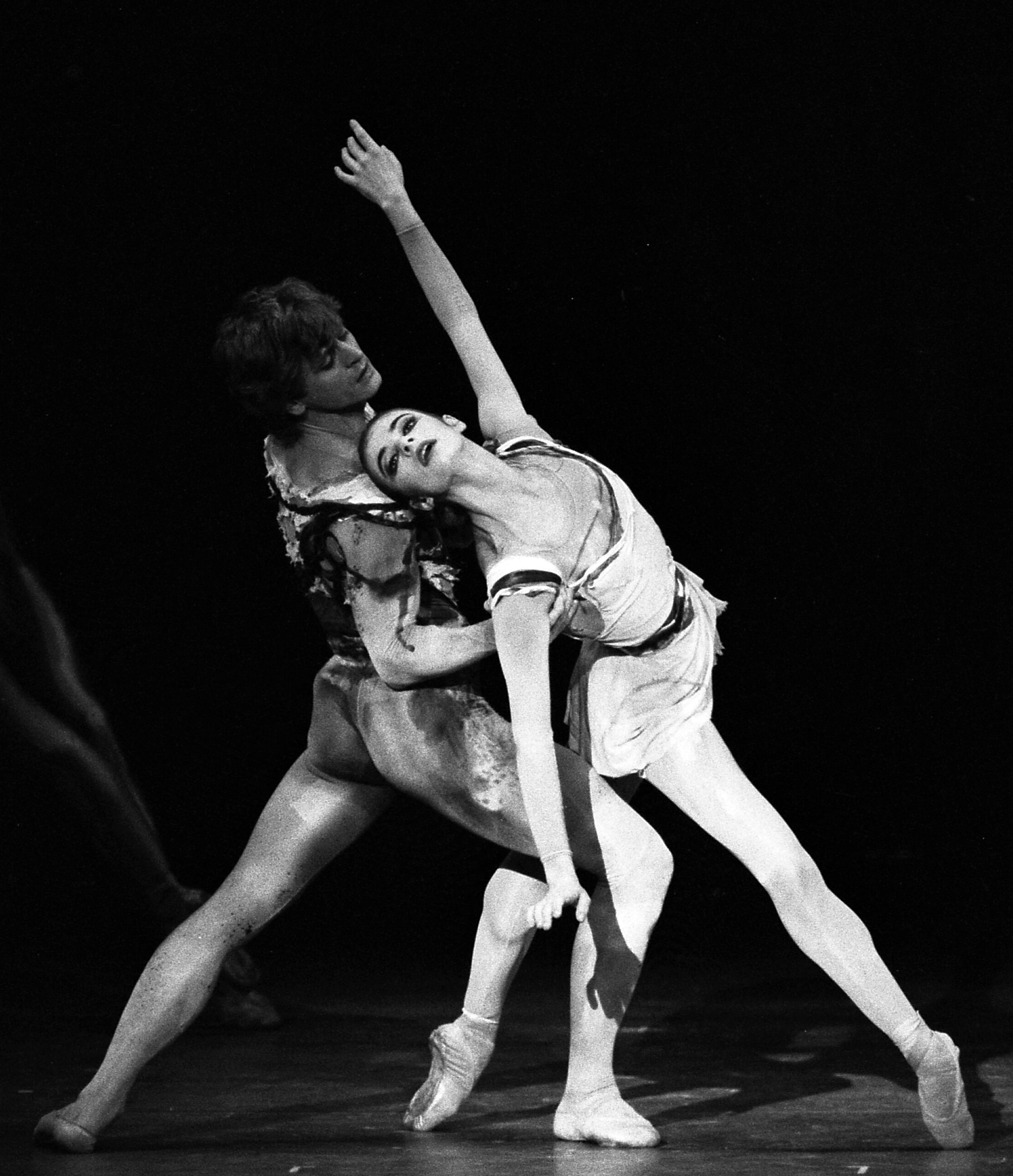
- Alessandra Ferri and Mikhail Baryshnikov in 1986
- Born: 6 May 1963 (age 63); Milan, Italy
- Years active: 1980–2007, 2013-
- Dancing career
- Former groups: Royal Ballet; American Ballet Theatre; La Scala Theatre Ballet

Alessandra Ferri OMRI (born 6 May 1963) is an Italian prima ballerina. She danced with the Royal Ballet (1980–1984), American Ballet Theatre (1985–2007) and La Scala Theatre Ballet (1992–2007) and as an international guest artist, before temporarily retiring on 10 August 2007, aged 44, then returning in 2013. She has been referred to by some publications as a prima ballerina assoluta.

== Career ==
Alessandra Ferri was born in Milan, Italy. She began studying ballet at the La Scala Theatre Ballet School, later transferring to the upper school of the Royal Ballet School. She represented the Royal Ballet School in the 1980 Prix de Lausanne, winning a scholarship which enabled her to continue studying at the school.

=== Royal Ballet ===
Ferri joined the Royal Ballet in 1980, and in 1982, for her first major role in the ballet Mayerling, she was nominated for the Laurence Olivier Award for Outstanding First Achievement of the Year in Ballet. In 1983, she was nominated for and won the Laurence Olivier Award for Outstanding Individual Performance of the Year in a New Dance Production for her role in Sir Kenneth MacMillan's Valley of Shadows. In 1983, she was promoted to the rank of Principal Dancer.

=== American Ballet Theatre ===
In 1985, Ferri left the Royal Ballet at the request of Mikhail Baryshnikov to become a Principal Dancer with American Ballet Theatre, under Baryshnikov's own direction. She stated that she needed a more rigorous training program that the company could provide. In 2007 she brought Roberto Bolle to dance opposite her in her farewell performance of Romeo and Juliet.

=== La Scala Theatre Ballet ===
In 1992, Ferri became a Guest Star of the American Ballet Theatre and began a very close collaboration with La Scala Theatre Ballet, becoming recognised as Prima Ballerina Assoluta of the company.

=== Return from retirement ===
She returned to dance after retirement in 2013, starring in The Piano Upstairs at Spoleto. Performances since have included Lea in Cheri for Signature Theatre, The Raven for Gotham Chamber Opera and in Woolf Works with Royal Ballet.

In June 2017, she appeared at the Royal Opera House in the ballet Marguerite and Armand. She has reprised her role in Woolf Works at the Royal Ballet in 2023 and at American Ballet Theater in 2024.

== Created roles ==
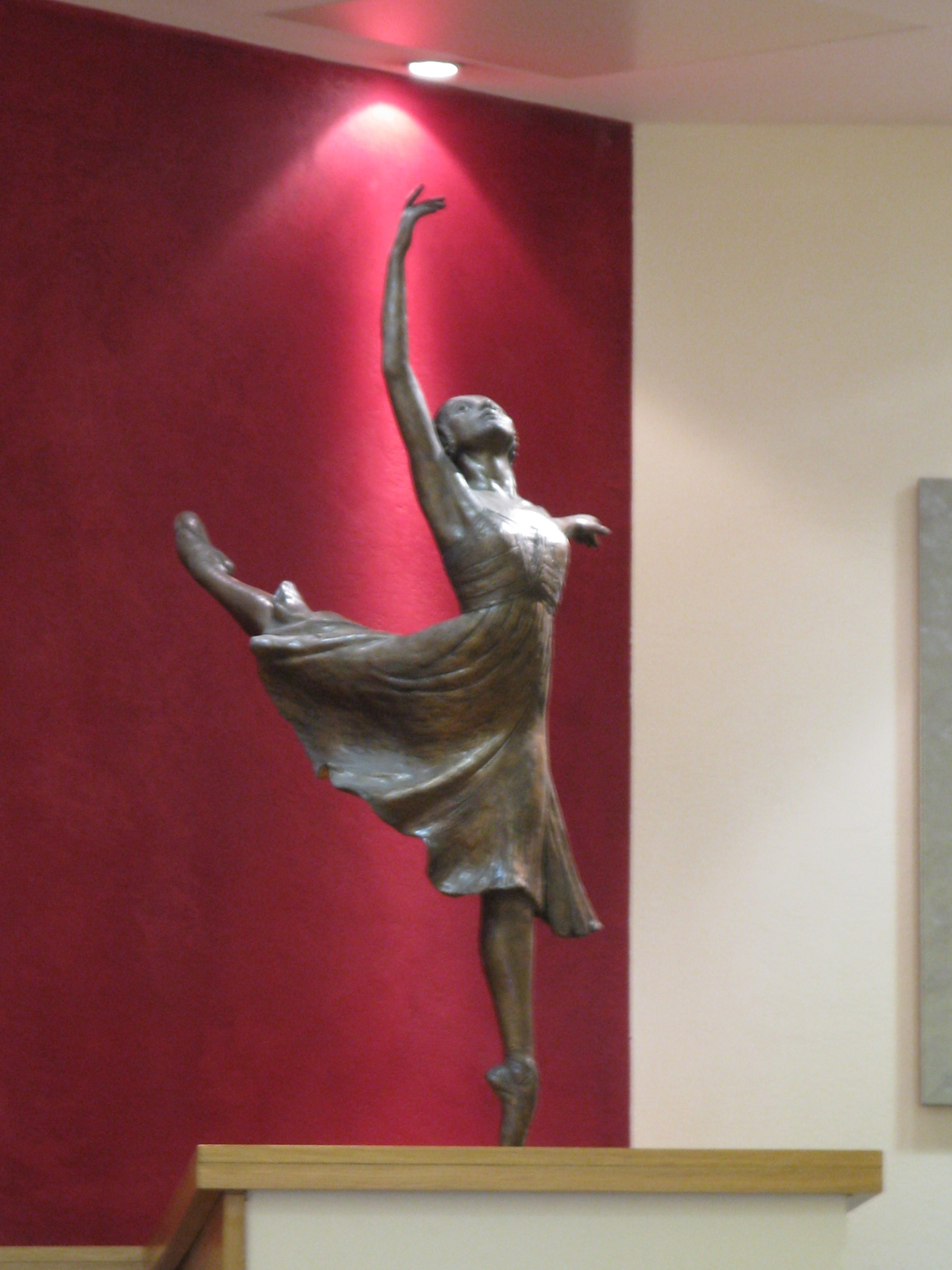
Statue of Alessandra Ferri as 'Juliet' by Nathan David inside the Royal Ballet School

- 1981 – Chanson (pas de deux) – Choreography by Sir Kenneth MacMillan, with the Royal Ballet.
- 1982 – Invitation au Voyage – Choreography by Michael Corder, with the Royal Ballet.
- 1983 – Consort Lessons – Choreography by David Bintley, with the Royal Ballet.
- 1983 – Valley of Shadows – Choreography by Sir Kenneth MacMillan, with the Royal Ballet.
- 1984 – Different Drummer – Choreography by Sir Kenneth MacMillan, with the Royal Ballet.
- 1985 – Swan Lake – Choreography by Rosella Hightower, with La Scala Ballet.
- 1986 – Requiem – Choreography by Sir Kenneth MacMillan, with the American Ballet Theatre.
- 1989 – Le Diable Amoureux – Choreography by Roland Petit, with the Ballet National de Marseille.
- 1990 – Birdy – Choreography by Jean-Pierre Aviotte, with the Ballet National de Marseille.
- 1991 – White Man Sleeps – Choreography by Daniel Ezralow, with Maggiodanza.
- 1992 – Un Petit Train de Plaisir – Choreography by Amedeo Amodio, with Aterballetto.
- 1993 – Le Baiser de la Fée – Choreography by Micha Van Hoecke, with La Scala Ballet.
- 1994 – Le Sang d'un Poète, La Voix Humaine – Choreography by Roland Petit, for Teatro Studio, Milan.
- 1995 – William Tell – Choreography by Heinz Spoerli, with the Ballet Nacional de Cuba.
- 1996 – Armide – Choreography by Heinz Spoerli, with La Scala Ballet.
- 1997 – Vespri Siciliani – Choreography by Heinz Spoerli, with the Rome Opera Ballet.
- 1997 – In Volo – Choreography by Jean-Christophe Maillot, with the American Ballet Theatre.
- 1998 – Quartetto – Choreography by William Forsythe, with La Scala Ballet.
- 1998 – Faust Tango – Choreography by Oscar Araiz, for the Ravenna Festival.
- 1999 – Mambo Suite – Choreography by Annamaria Steckelman, for the Colon Theatre, Buenos Aires.
- 2004 – Europa Riconosciuta – Choreography by Heinz Spoerli, with La Scala Ballet.
- 2013 - The Piano Upstairs - Choreography by Alessandra Ferri, Spoleto Festival dei 2 Mondi
- 2013 - Cheri - Choreography by Martha Clarke, Signature Theater, New York
- 2015 - Woolf Works - Choreography by Wayne McGregor, Royal Ballet, Covent Garden, London
- 2016 - Duse - Choreography by John Neumeier, Hamburg Ballett, Hamburg
- 2017 - Witness Choreography by Wayne McGregor, City Center, New York
- 2018 - Afterite Choreography by Wayne McGregor, American Ballet Theatre, New York Metropolitan Opera House

== Guest appearances ==
As an international guest artist, Ferri performed with the Paris Opera Ballet at the Palais Garnier and the Opéra Bastille, the Kirov Ballet at the Mariinsky Theatre, the National Ballet of Canada, the Tokyo Ballet, the Cuban National Ballet, the Hamburg Ballet, the Stuttgart Ballet, the Ballet National de Marseille, the Ballet National de Nancy and others.

She is particularly known for her performances in story ballets choreographed by Kenneth MacMillan, Roland Petit, John Cranko and John Neumeier.

She danced with important male dancers: Rudolf Nureyev (in Los Angeles for his 50th birthday in 1988), Mikhail Baryshnikov in the 1987 film Dancers, Anthony Dowell, Patrick Dupond, Peter Schaufuss, Maximiliano Guerra, Laurent Hilaire, Manuel Legris, Julio Bocca (her favourite), Herman Cornejo, Marcelo Gomes, Ethan Stiefel, and Carlos Acosta.

== Personal life ==
Ferri has two daughters: Matilde (born in 1997) and Emma (born in 2001), who joined their mother on stage at her farewell performance. Their father is the Italian photographer Fabrizio Ferri, who founded the art school Università dell'Immagine, in Milan, Italy.

== Video recordings ==
- 1984 – Sir Kenneth MacMillan's – Romeo and Juliet as Juliet, with Wayne Eagling, David Drew and London's Royal Ballet.
- 1987 – Herbert Ross's film Dancers as Francesca, with Mikhail Baryshnikov, Leslie Browne, Julie Kent, Tommy Rall and American Ballet Theatre (VHS Tape Only).
- 1987 – George Balanchine's La Sonnambula as The Sleepwalker, with Mikhail Baryshnikov and American Ballet Theatre.
- 1996 – Giselle as Giselle, with Massimo Murru and La Scala Ballet.
- 1998 – Romeo & Juliet Pas de Deux with Julio Bocca, on a mixed bill DVD titled American Ballet Theatre Now – Variety and Virtuosity.
- 2000 – Romeo and Juliet as Juliet, with Angel Corella and La Scala Ballet.
- 2003 – Sir Frederick Ashton's The Dream as Titania, with Ethan Stiefel, Herman Cornejo and American Ballet Theatre.
- 2003 – Roland Petit's La Chauve-Souris as Bella, with Massimo Murru and La Scala Ballet.
- 2007 – George Balanchine's A Midsummer Night's Dream as Titania, with Roberto Bolle, Massimo Murru and La Scala Ballet.
- 2017 - Wayne McGregor's Woolf Works, with Royal Ballet.

== Awards and honours (selected) ==
- 1982 – Olivier Award – Outstanding First Achievement of the Year in Ballet – Nominated
- 1983 – Olivier Award – Outstanding Individual Performance of the Year in a New Dance Production – WON
- 1990 – Premio Léonide Massine, Positano
- 1992 - Named "Prima Ballerina Assoluta"
- 2000 – Prix Benois de la Danse, Moscow
- 2004 – Order of Merit of the Italian Republic (Knight)
- 2005 – Dance Magazine Award, New York
- 2016 – Critics' Circle National Dance Award: Grishko Award for the best female dancer (Woolf Works, The Royal Ballet)
- 2016 – Olivier Award – Outstanding Achievement in Dance for her performances in Chéri and Woolf Works at the Royal Opera House
