= Oriella Dorella =

Italian ballet dancer

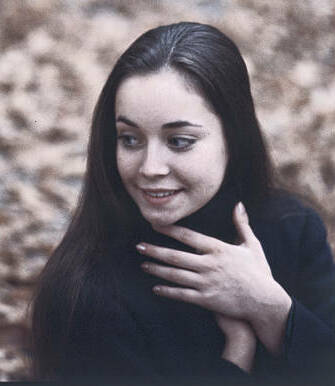
Oriella Dorella in 1967.

Oriella Dorella (born 25 January 1952) is an Italian ballet dancer. From 1986 to 1994 she was principal dancer of La Scala in Milan.

== Life and career ==
Born in Milan, Dorella studied at La Scala Theatre Ballet School for 8 years, and in 1975 she made her official debut as a dancer, becoming the étoile of La Scala Theatre Ballet in 1986.

Throughout her career she has danced in major Italian theaters, including at the Teatro dell'Opera di Roma, Verona Arena, Teatro Comunale di Bologna and Piccolo Teatro di Milano, dancing in original productions of George Balanchine's Tschaikovsky Piano Concerto No. 2, Gian Carlo Menotti's Amahl and the Night Visitors, Mario Pistoni and Nino Rota's La Strada, and in Franco Zeffirelli and Rosella Hightower's revival of Swan Lake.

Dorella has also danced in productions by Giuseppe Carbone, John Cranko, Hans van Manen, Gheorghe Iancu, Birgit Cullberg, Elisabetta Terabust, Roland Petit, Alvin Ailey and Flemming Flindt.

She was also a television personality, and her television appearances include the Saturday night variety show Fantastico and several television films. In 2006 she ran for the Senate in Milan with Rose in the Fist, without being elected.

== Personal life ==
Dorella was married to journalist Eugenio Gallavotti from 1986 to 1994. During the course of their marriage they adopted two sons, Moises and Marco of Brazilian origin.
