= Aida Boni =

Italian dancer (1880–1974)

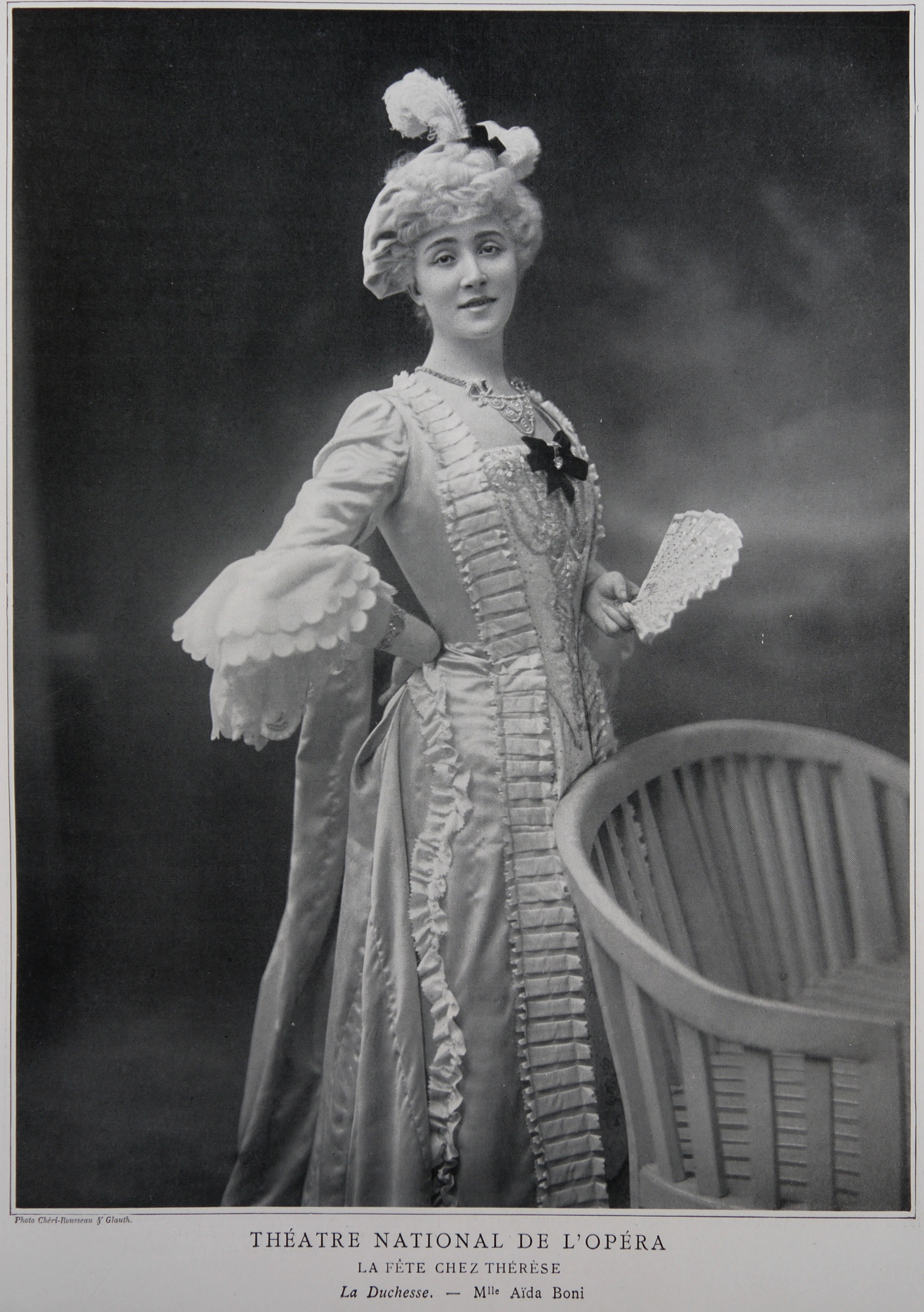
Aida Boni

Aida Boni (18 November 1880 – 1974) was an Italian dancer. She was a ballet artist in the late 19th and early 20th centuries.

== Biography ==
Aida Boni was born in Milan, Italy on 18 November 1880. She studied dance at La Scala in Milan and made her professional debut in Florence, before moving to Paris. During the 1898–1899 season, she danced at the Casino de Paris, the Opéra-Comique and the Théâtre Marigny. At the same time, she was part of the cast of the Mariinsky Theatre. She made multiple tours across Europe and performed in the main theaters.

From 1901 to 1906, she was engaged at the Théâtre de la Monnaie in Brussels, as first half-character dancer. In September 1903, she became principal dancer. During her engagement with Royal Opera House at Covent Garden, London in 1907, she returned the same year to La Scala in Milan. But she later continued her performance as a principal dancer mainly at the Paris Opera, where she created numerous roles with the leading dancers including Rosita Mauri, Rita Sangalli, Carlotta Zambelli and Jeanne Chasles. She retired in 1922.

She died in 1974.
