= Università dell'Immagine =

Post-secondary training school

Università dell'Immagine, (also known as "UI") was the post-secondary training school of Fondazione Industria Onlus Milan, a non-profit organization founded by the photographer Fabrizio Ferri. UI offered an experimental, two-year certificate program on the five senses in Milan, Italy, between 1998 and 2005.

== Ferri's Philosophy of the Image ==
Università dell'Immagine literally translates in English as "the University of the Image." Fabrizio Ferri, UI's founder, and an early pioneer in the usage of digital technology in fashion photography, wanted to create a campus environment where creative professionals from disparate fields would find common ground in studying the word "immagine" or image. Ferri believes that images are not merely visual stimuli, nor are they static objects. According to Ferri, “Image is the harmony defined by the integrated work of the senses.”

While developing the two-year training program of UI with Tania Silvia Gianesin, the school's eventual Dean, Ferri compiled his ideas in various written documents, including UI's brochure, enrollment documents and academic lectures. According to Ferri, "Image is the form of communication, language and literature of this new century. An image originates from a received input, which is elaborated in order to express a personal "point of view" that can be communicated through different means. All creative processes are defined by the sequence: input, elaboration and output. These three terms also describe the synthesis of the digital system. The individual perception of values - just as one's own point of view - must be formed by a process of knowledge, elaboration and synthesis, in order to be valuable and useful. Should this process not occur, the resulting image would be hurled in the void of 'professionalism' without culture. It is not 'the end that justifies the means' that frees us from responsibilities, but the understanding of the ends for a responsible choice of the means."

== Mission ==
Università dell'Immagine was the formative school of Fondazione Industria Onlus Milan, founded by Fabrizio Ferri. It was a two-year course that prepared young people for the diverse trades related to image and communication, understood as professions holistically viewed through all senses. The formative activity was therefore realized through a program constructed around the five senses – sight, hearing, touch, taste, and smell – and the links between them, the synergy and coherence of the contents. The subject matter was organized following the guidelines: Input, Elaboration, Output, to which Research is added, applied in turn through UI's various laboratories, including the Laboratory of the Senses and the Laboratory of Psychophysiology.

The work of the students and teachers involved exercises, projects and lessons, and tended towards: a return to a sensitivity such that one can use the senses consistent with their expression; to contribute to knowledge and recognition of the inclinations of the students, safeguarding their originality and authenticity; to accompany and orient the choices of individual students; to create a good working team; to encourage interaction of diverse approaches and elaboration, rather than transmit a predefined knowledge; to define the relationship between ethics and aesthetics.

The school was set up on the principle of auto-determination and self-evaluation and therefore measured only the sense of responsibility, sociability, seriousness and authenticity of the students, who were selected for businesses through the realization of projects and an internship program, consistent with their aptitudes. The school had an international vocation and welcomed students of various nationalities, facilitating and promoting a multicultural approach.

== Administration and Organisation ==
The two-year course had 158 international students in total, coming from 12 different countries. Dean of the Università dell'Immagine, since its foundation up to the final year, was Tania Silvia Gianesin.

== Teachers/Subjects ==
Teacher	Subject
Enrica Baldi	Sensory Perception (Montessori)
Anna Barbara	Sensorial Design
Benedetta Barzini	Image Decoding
Leonello Bertolucci	Photo Editing
David Bychkov	Holographic Cinema
Brunetto Casalini	Film Editing
Alessandro De Benedittis	Business Plan
Stefano Di Tommaso	Photographic Studio
Francesco Dondina	Graphic Design
Jean-Claude Ellena	Perfume Science
Fabrizio Ferri	Image and creative journey
Vinicio Ferri	Photographic Techniques
Paola Goretti	Scenarios
Nancy Martin	Touch
Davide Paolini	Taste territories
Pino Pischetola	Guide to music listening
Armon Rossi	Aikido/Body Awareness
Fabio Selvafiorita	Sound Design
Roger Schmid	Team building in a global world
Maria Sebregondi	Language Perception
Raffaele Stefani	Acoustic Theory
Symrise	Flavors
Symrise	Global Marketing
Letizia Schmid	Sensory Research

== Campus ==
The campus was based in a conversion warehouse building located in Via Gaspare Bugatti 7, Milan, Italy. The premises were next to Industria Superstudio (shooting studios), Industria Musica (recording studios) and Ristorante Industria (restaurant), were UI lessons and projects often took place. Students had also access to a dance hall, where Aikido, Yoga/Body Awareness classes and special projects were held.

== Projects ==
Throughout the years the school developed creative and research projects for/with international clients and institutions.

1,2,3,4,5: Ceriani A., Nigro V. "Dai sensi un apprendere - Percorsi di apprendimento, innovazioni metodologiche e didattiche nell'esperienza dell'Università dell'Immagine". Franco Angeli, Milano 2006
