= Training system =

A training system is a group or family of coursework that will achieve a stated series of training objectives. A training system typically employs a syllabus or similar document that specifies and outlines the coursework to be followed. A training system may also incorporate a training manual that may serve as a guide, reference source, or both during training. A training system typically mandates the use of specific teaching methods for coursework; the choice of the teaching methods to be used depends largely on the information or skill being taught and the aptitude and skills of the trainee.

Specialized equipment is often used in training systems that are used to teach physical skills. For example, a barre is used in ballet training. In some cases, simulators are used, especially when the use of actual hardware is impractical due to high cost or risk of injury. Examples of this are the flight simulators used in pilot training and the tactical engagement simulation systems used in combat training.

== Types ==
Training systems are categorized in various ways. For example, military training systems are generally categorized as live, virtual, or constructive, according to the nature of the trainees' interaction with training equipment and each other. A "live" training system is one in which real people operate real equipment in the field, whereas "virtual" training systems involve real people operating models of real equipment in virtual environments. "Constructive" systems involve simulations where real people initiate events that stimulate the simulation but event outcomes are determined by the overall simulation.
