= La Scala Theatre Ballet =

Italian ballet company

General information
- Name: La Scala Theatre Ballet
- Local name: Corpo di Ballo del Teatro alla Scala
- Year founded: 1778 (at La Scala)
- Principal venue: La Scala Theatre; Via Filodrammatici 2 Milan; Italy
- Website: www.teatroallascala.org/en

Senior staff
- Director: Manuel Legris
- Coordinator: Marco Berrichillo

Artistic staff
- Ballet Mistress: Lara Montanaro

Other
- Parent company: La Scala
- Associated schools: La Scala Theatre Ballet School
- Formation: Etoile; Guest Artist; Principal; Soloist; Corps de Ballet; Reserve Corps de Ballet

The La Scala Theatre Ballet (Italian: Corpo di ballo del Teatro alla Scala) is the resident classical ballet company at La Scala in Milan, Italy. One of the oldest and most renowned ballet companies in the world, the company pre-dates the theatre, but was officially founded at the inauguration of La Scala in 1778. Many leading dancers have performed with the company, including Mara Galeazzi, Alessandra Ferri, Viviana Durante, Roberto Bolle and Carla Fracci. The official associate school of the company is the La Scala Theatre Ballet School (Italian: Scuola di Ballo del Teatro alla Scala), a constituent of the La Scala Theatre Academy (Italian: Accademia Teatro alla Scala).

It is one of the best known Italian ballet companies, and many of its dancers have achieved international fame, such as Mara Galeazzi, Alessandra Ferri, Petra Conti, Roberto Bolle, Massimo Murru, and in the recent past, Carla Fracci.

Other personalities of the history of classical ballet associated with the corpo di ballo have been the teachers and choreographers Carlo Blasis and Enrico Cecchetti, the ballerinas Carlotta Grisi, Caterina Beretta, Carlotta Brianza and the prima ballerina assoluta Pierina Legnani, among many others.

Although the company was only founded officially after the inauguration of the Teatro alla Scala in 1778, its history can be traced back to Renaissance courts of Italy, notably in the Sforza family’s splendid palace in Milan, where the classical ballet itself was born as an art form to be later refined at the French court of Louis XIV. The first nucleus of the company was brought to Milan by the choreographer Gasparo Angiolini between 1779 and 1789, as part of his reform of serious opera. Milan was also home to Salvatore Viganò, who experimented his personal interpretation of ballet d’action (which he called “coreodramma”); this in turn later inspired Carlo Blasis and other choreographers.

Many modern choreographers have collaborated with the corpo di ballo, such as George Balanchine and Roland Petit, often to create unique ballets for the company and its étoiles.

The company's repertoire includes both classical ballets and more modern pieces; among them: Giselle, Swan lake, The Taming of the Shrew, Carmen, Onegin, Theme and Variations, and many more.

Many of the company members come from the Scuola di Ballo del Teatro alla Scala.
