= Alberto Testa (dancer) =

Italian dancer (1922–2019)

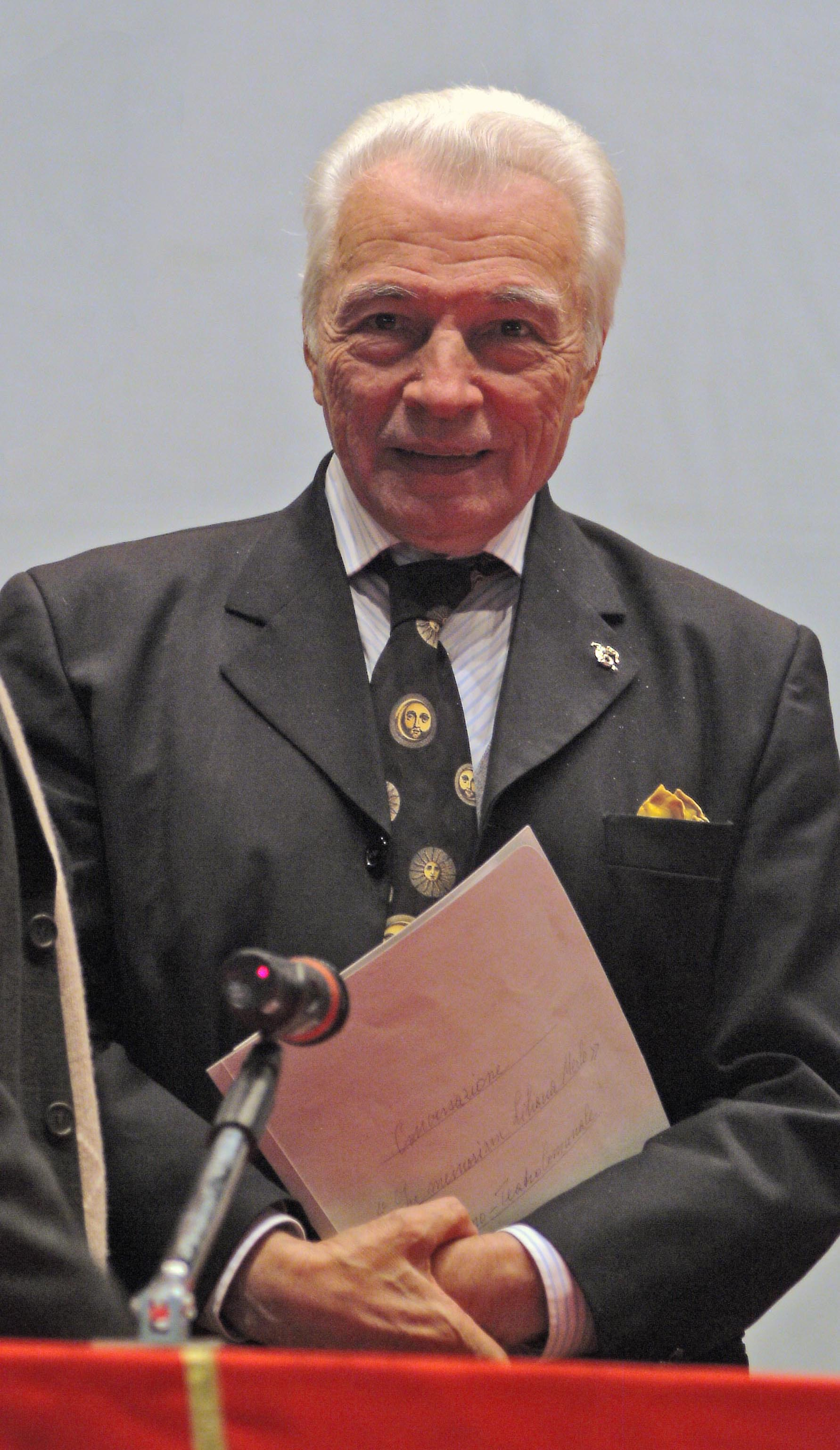
Testa in 2013

Alberto Testa (23 December 1922 – 4 October 2019) was an Italian dancer, choreographer, dance critic and teacher, born in Turin, Kingdom of Italy. He choreographed a number of ballets to operatic music, and worked on films with Franco Zeffirelli and Luchino Visconti.

Testa died in Turin on 4 October 2019 at the age of 96.
