= National Dance Academy (Italy) =

Italian national dance academy in Rome

Coordinates: 41°53′2″N 12°28′59″E

Accademia nazionale di danza

Location
- Rome; Italy

Information
- Established: 1940
- Endowment: Ministry of Education, Universities and Research (MIUR) and the Ministry of Cultural Heritage and Activities
- Website: accademianazionaledanza.it

The Accademia nazionale di danza (National Dance Academy) was established in 1940 in Italy and aims to promote the art and technique of dance. The National Dance Academy is the only university-level institute in Italy dedicated exclusively to the training of dancers, teachers, and choreographers, awarding academy diplomas equivalent to laurea (bachelor's degree) and laurea magistrale (master's degree).

== History ==
Founded in 1940 in Rome by Jia Ruskaja, who transformed her own milanese school into a public institution, the organization's name was initially Regia Scuola di Danza (Royal Dance School) and was annexed to the National Academy of Dramatic Arts, before becoming autonomous in 1948 under the current denomination of Accademia Nazionale di Danza (National Dance Academy). The first teacher was Giuliana Penzi, a student of Cia Fornaroli. Other dance masters include Clotilde and Alexander Sakharoff and David Lichine, in 1950, and later Kurt Jooss and Jean Cébron. In 1958 the Centro Coreutico Nazionale (National Choreutic Center) was established, a committee that included leading elements of the ballet companies of La Scala, San Carlo, and the Rome Opera House, including Olga Amati and Guido Lauri. In 1999, the National Dance Academy became an Istituto di Alta Cultura, a university-level institution, connected to the Ministry of Education, University and Research.

== Facilities ==
The academy is located near the Aventine Hill, in Largo Arrigo VII, since 1954, in a complex called Castello dei Cesari, dating back to Roman times. The academy boasts a 3000 m2 garden and it is divided into three buildings, housing offices, dance classrooms, theatres, and libraries. The academy is also equipped with two outdoor theaters with mobile stages and an internal one, the Ruskaja Theatre, created from an ancient Roman cistern.

=== Directors ===
- Jia Ruskaja (1948-1970)
- Giuliana Penzi (1970-1989)
- Lia Calizza (1989-1996)
- Margherita Parrilla (1996-2013), with Pina Bausch as Honorary Director (2006-2009)
- Bruno Carioti (2013-2014), as Special Commissioner
- Giovanna Cassese (2014-2015), as Special Commissioner
- Bruno Carioti (2015-2016)
- Giulio Vesperini (2016-2017), as Special Commissioner
- Maria Enrica Palmieri (2017-)
