= Jia Ruskaja =

Russian dancer and choreographer

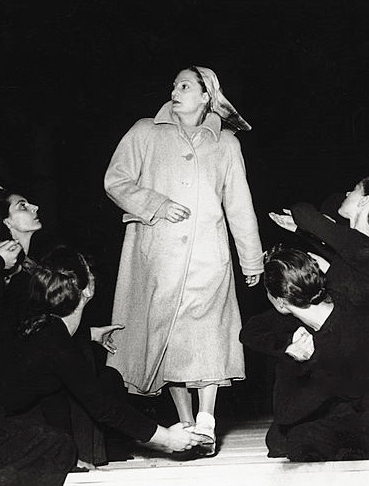
Jia Ruskaja during the rehearsal of Medea in the 1950s.

Jia Ruskaja (born Evgeniya Fyodorovna Borisenko, Russian: Евгения Фёдоровна Борисенко; 6 January 1902 – 19 April 1970) was a Russian dancer and choreographer who established the National Dance Academy of Italy. Her stage name "Jia Ruskaja", which means "I am Russian", was used for the first time by Anton Giulio Bragaglia.

== Biography ==
With her father, an officer in the Russian Imperial Army, Ruskaja fled Russia in 1918 just after the October Revolution. She studied dance in Crimea, before attending medical school in Geneva. Ruskaja married Evans Daniel Pole in Constantinople in 1920; after their marriage was annulled, their son lived in London with his father. Her dancing debut occurred 4 June 1921 in Rome at the Casa d'Arte Bragaglia. She opened her first ballet school in Milan at the Teatro Dal Verme in 1929. From 1932 to 1934, she directed the La Scala Theatre Ballet School. After her marriage to Aldo Borelli, editor of Corriere della Sera, Ruskaja received Italian citizenship. In 1940, she founded the Royal School of Dance, initially attached to the Accademia Nazionale di Arte Drammatica Silvio D'Amico, which became independent in 1948 as Accademia nazionale di danza, a school which only admitted women. She was its director until 1970. Daisy Parrilla and Eleonora Abbagnato had contentious claims to the “Premio Roma Jia Russkaja” prize in 2011.

== Selected filmography ==
- Judith and Holofernes (1929)

== Awards ==
- 1962, Premio Minerva d’Oro
