= Caterina Beretta =

Italian ballet dancer (1839–1911)

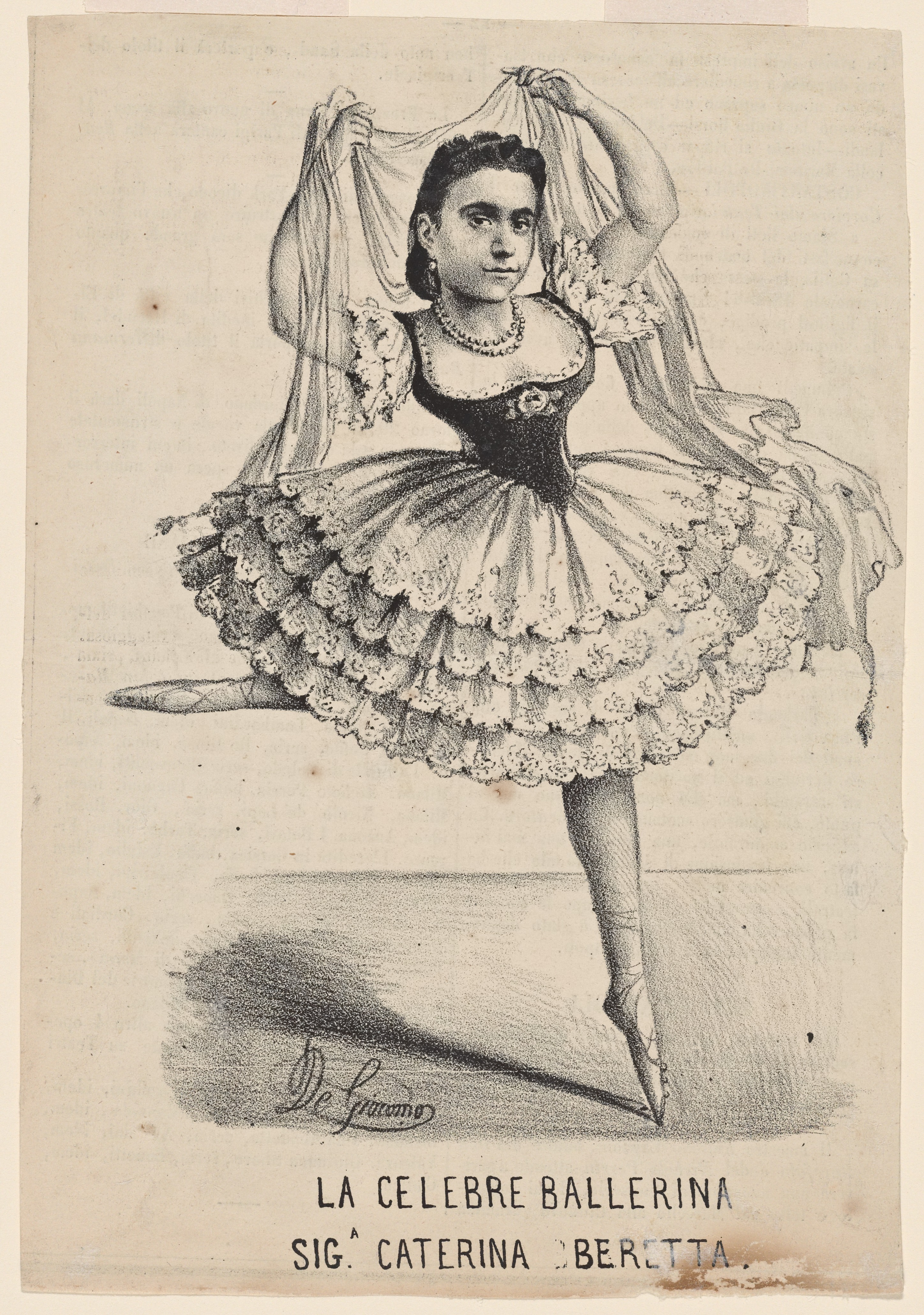
- Newspaper cutting of Caterina Beretta dated 1864
- Born: 8 December 1839; Milan
- Died: 1 January 1911 (aged 71); Milan
- Occupations: Ballet dancer and dancing master
- Spouse: Lorenzo Viena

Caterina Beretta (8 December 1839 – 1 January 1911) was an Italian ballet dancer and dance teacher. She was one of the most celebrated ballet dancers of the 19th century and was famous throughout Europe, appearing in London and Italy.

== Biography ==
Caterina Beretta was born on 8 December 1839 and was the daughter of a mime. She studied with Auguste Hus in the ballet school of the Teatro alla Scala.

== Career ==
In 1853 she appeared in the premiere of Giuseppe Verdi's opera Les vêpres siciliennes in France. In 1855 she went to Paris to perform in Le Diable à Quatre and Jovita, ou Les Boucaniers Mexicains by Joseph Mazilier, where she was impressed to Théophile Gautier. On the contrary, she received negative reviews for her performance in The Four Seasons.

In 1856 and 1857 in Milan and Rome, she performed in Shakespeare, ossia Un Sogno di una Notte d'Estate, by Giovanni Casati. Until 1871 she danced as prima ballerina at the Teatro Regio in Turin, where she alternated with performances at La Scala, La Fenice, and Teatro Pagliano.

In 1877, she was maîtresse de ballet at the Mariinsky Theatre in St. Petersburg, and also at La Scala between 1905 and 1908. Her students would eventually include Anna Pavlova, Pierina Legnani, Tamara Karsavina, Rosina Galli, Ria Teresa Legnani, Marie Giuri, and Cia Fornaroli.
