= Roberto Bolle =

Italian danseur (born 1975)

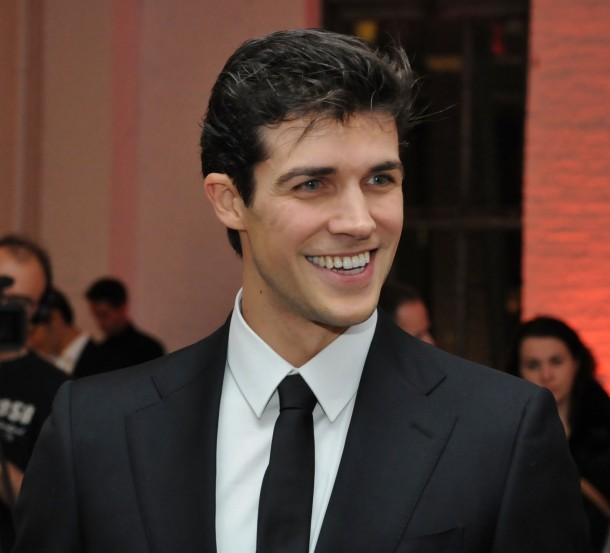
- Bolle in 2012
- Born: 26 March 1975 (age 51); Casale Monferrato
- Citizenship: Italian
- Education: Accademia Teatro alla Scala
- Occupations: Dancer; choreographer; ballet director
- Years active: 1995-present
- Height: 1.87 m (6 ft 2 in)
- Partner: Daniel Lee
- Website: robertobolle.com

Roberto Bolle Ufficiale OMRI (born 26 March 1975) is an Italian danseur. He is a principal dancer étoile at La Scala Theatre Ballet. Bolle also dances regularly as a guest artist with the world’s leading companies, including The Royal Ballet, the Mariinsky Ballet, the Bolshoi Ballet and the Paris Opera Ballet.

== Early life ==
Bolle was born in Casale Monferrato, and lived during his youth in Trino, a small town near Vercelli in Piemonte. He began ballet studies at the age of seven at a local school and was accepted at the La Scala theatre ballet school in Milan at the age of twelve. In 1990, he was noted by Rudolf Nureyev, who chose him to play the role of Tadzio in the opera Morte a Venezia, but the Theater forbade him to accept the offer because he was too young.

== Career ==
In 1996, following an appearance in Romeo and Juliet, twenty-year-old Bolle was promoted to principal dancer at La Scala. He left that position when he was 21 to pursue a freelance career. Since then he has starred in many ballets including Sleeping Beauty, Swan Lake, Cinderella, The Nutcracker, Giselle, La Esmeralda, and In the Middle, Somewhat Elevated.

Bolle has danced for the Royal Ballet, the Tokyo Ballet, the National Ballet of Canada, the Stuttgart Ballet, the Finnish National Ballet, the Staatsoper in Berlin, the Vienna State Opera, the Semperoper in Dresden, the Bavarian State Opera, the Internationale Maifestspiele Wiesbaden, the 8th and 9th International Ballet Festivals in Tokyo, the Teatro dell'Opera di Roma, the Teatro di San Carlo in Naples, and the City Theatre in Florence.

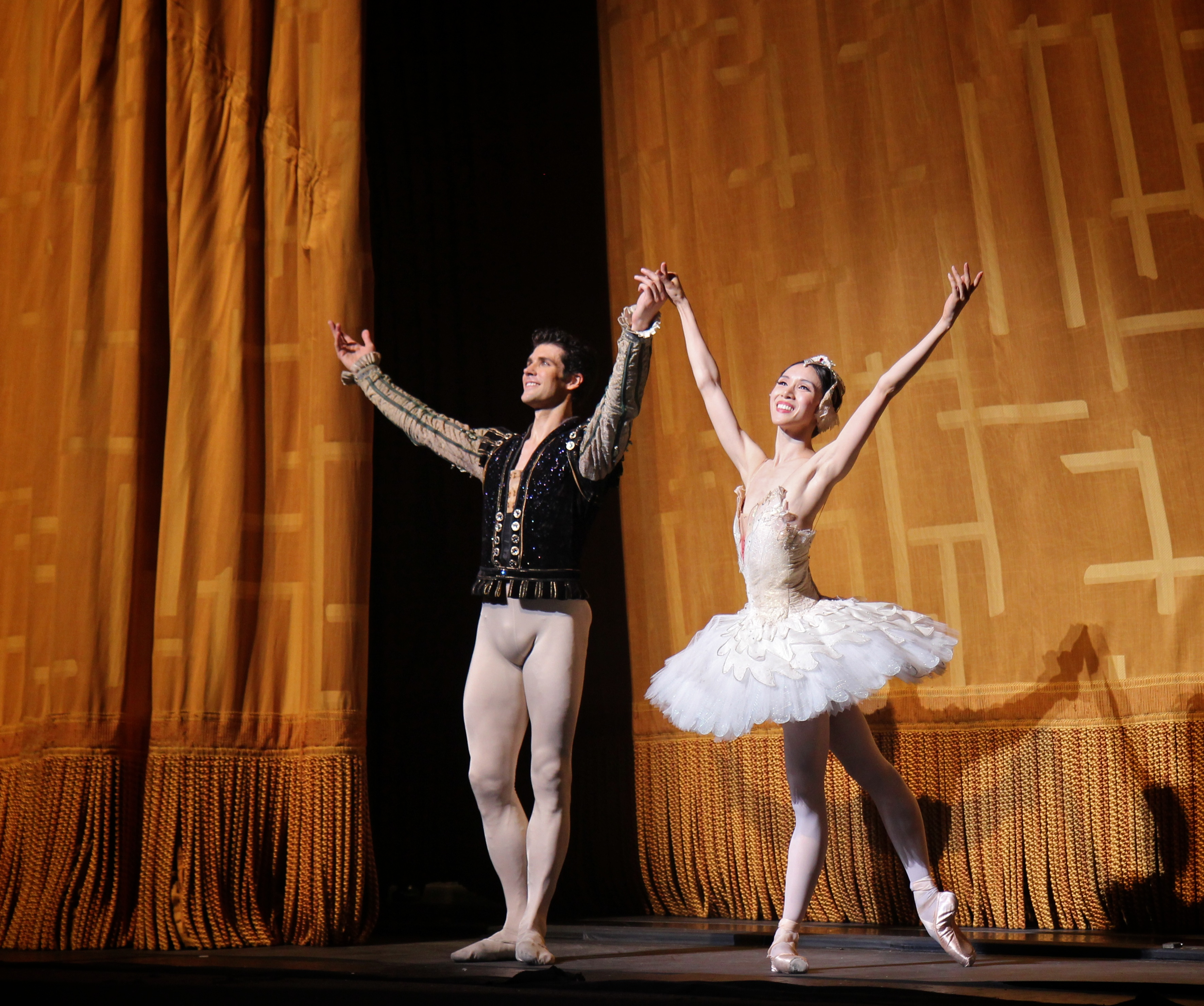
Hee Seo and Roberto Bolle, 28 June 2014

Derek Deane, the English National Ballet director, created two productions for him: Swan Lake and Romeo and Juliet, both of them performed at the Royal Albert Hall in London. On the 10th anniversary of the Opera Theatre in Cairo, he performed in Aida at the pyramids of Giza and afterwards at the Arena in Verona for a new version of the opera live worldwide.

In October 2000 he opened the season at Covent Garden Opera House in London performing Swan Lake, and in November he was invited by the Bolshoi Ballet to celebrate Maya Plisetskaya's 75th anniversary in the presence of President Vladimir Putin.

In June 2002, on the occasion of Queen Elizabeth's Golden Jubilee, he danced the Swan Lake Act III pas de deux with Royal Ballet principal dancer Zenaida Yanowsky in the ballroom at Buckingham Palace in the presence of the Queen. The event was broadcast live by BBC and transmitted to all the Commonwealth countries.

During the 2003–2004 season he was promoted to Étoile of La Scala Theatre. On 1 April 2004 he danced in front of Pope John Paul II in St. Peter's Square to celebrate young people's day. On 7 December, to celebrate the re-opening of La Scala Theatre after its restoration, he danced Europa riconosciuta with Alessandra Ferri and three weeks later in the New Year’s Eve Star Gala.

In December 2005 at Covent Garden Opera House in London he performed Frederick Ashton’s production of Sylvia, broadcast by the BBC on Christmas Day.

Bolle danced at the opening ceremony of the 2006 Winter Olympic Games in Turin where he performed a solo created for him by Enzo Cosimi. The ceremony was broadcast worldwide and seen by 2.5 billion people.

In 2007 he performed for the first time with ABT as a guest artist, on the occasion of Alessandra Ferri’s farewell performance.

For the 2009 spring season at the Metropolitan Opera House in New York City, Bolle performed as a principal dancer with the American Ballet Theatre: the first time that a male Italian dancer joined the company as a principal. The "Dance Listings" in the New York Times on 26 June 2009 described Bolle as "utterly gorgeous (in both looks and dance)." Bolle’s spring 2010 American Ballet Theatre performances include The Lady of the Camellias, Swan Lake, La Bayadère, and Romeo and Juliet.

In June 2019, Roberto Bolle left the American Ballet Theatre. He took the stage for the final time with the company as Des Grieux, partnering Hee Seo as the titular role in Manon.

He performed at the 2026 Winter Olympics closing ceremony in Verona, Italy.

== Other work ==
Bolle has appeared in numerous fashion and style magazines and has been featured in advertising campaigns; Ferragamo featured him in a 2008 promotion and he also was featured in Vogue US 2009 alongside supermodel Coco Rocha in an editorial spread. Bolle also has an agreement with Giorgio Armani, who supplies him with clothes.

Since 1999 he has been a Goodwill Ambassador for UNICEF. In 2006 he visited Sudan, spending time at schools and hospitals. As of June 2007, he had raised over $655,000 for education and health projects in Sudan.

== Personal life ==
As of 2025 he is in a relationship with Daniel Lee, fashion designer and creative director of Burberry. The couple live in London.
