= Titianus =

Titianus may refer to:

- Lucius Salvius Otho Titianus, elder brother of the Roman emperor Otho
- Maes Titianus, traveller
- Titus Atilius Rufus Titianus, Roman senator
- Titus Flavius Titianus (prefectus 126)
- Titus Flavius Titianus (consul)
- Titus Flavius Postumius Titianus, Roman politician
- Titian of Brescia, 5th-century bishop
- Titian of Oderzo, 7th-century bishop
- Titian (c. 1488/1490 – 1576), Italian Renaissance painter

== See also ==
- Titiana
- Titian (disambiguation)
- Tiziano (disambiguation)
