= Elisabetta Terabust =

Italian ballerina and company director (1946–2018)

- Born: 5 August 1946; Varese, Lombardy, Italy
- Died: 5 February 2018 (aged 71); Rome, Italy
- Education: Teatro dell'Opera di Roma
- Occupation: Ballerina
- Years active: 1955–2009

Elisabetta Terabust (5 August 1946 – 5 February 2018) was an Italian ballerina and company director. She trained at the Teatro dell'Opera di Roma and worked for the London Festival Ballet (now the English National Ballet) and the Ballet National de Marseille. Terabust served as director of the Teatro dell'Opera di Roma, La Scala, MaggioDanza of the Maggio Musicale Fiorentino and of the Corps de ballet at the Teatro di San Carlo at various points between 1990 and 2009. The primary ballet rehearsal room at the Teatro dell'Opera Di Roma Dancing School was renamed for her.

== Early life and career ==
On 5 August 1946, Terabust was born Elisabetta Magli in Varese, Lombardy, Italy. Her mother Charlotte was a French woman of Basque descent and took up training in ballet and dancing as a child. Terabust moved to Rome when she was eight years old, and began training at the Teatro dell'Opera di Roma after joining it at age nine. . Terabust practised under Attilia Radice, graduated from the school in 1962 and joined the ballet company under the guidance of Guido Lauri, where she was made prima ballerina in 1966. Terabust performed in Giselle, La Sylphide, Les Biches, Balanchine's Symphony in C, Romeo and Juliet among others alongside choreographers Erik Bruhn, Aurel Milloss and Žarko Prebil. She won the 1969 Positano Prize alongside Liliana Cosi and the 1970 Le Noci d'Oro en Lecce accolades, and was subsequently promoted to étoile in 1972.

In 1973, Terabust moved from Marseille to London, joining the London Festival Ballet (now the English National Ballet) to perform some leading classical repertoire roles. At the Ballet, she consolidated her British and international career in roles in Swan Lake, Coppélia, The Nutcracker, The Sleeping Beauty and Giselle. Terabust worked with contemporary dancers such as George Balanchine, John Cranko, Barry Moreland and Glen Tetley. She went on to dance to the versions of Nutcracker, Carmen and Notre-Dame de Paris amongst others set by Roland Petit at the Ballet National de Marseille at his request when she joined his company in 1977.

Terabust returned to Italy in the 1980s and was a guest performer at Aterballetto in works by Alvin Ailey, Amedeo Amodio, Balanchine and William Forsythe. She also performed for the National Ballet of Canada and with the Teatro dell'Opera di Roma as well as Teatro Comunale, Florence, the Verona Arena and Naples' Teatro di San Carlo. In 1983, Terabust appeared on the BBC television programme Dancer. Following her retirement from dancing, she was appointed director of the Teatro dell'Opera Di Roma in 1990, remaining at the company until 1992. Between 1993 and 1997, Terabust served as director of Ballet at the La Scala opera house in Milan, where she taught Roberto Bolle and Massimo Murru.

She went on to direct the MaggioDanza that is a permanent company of the Maggio Musicale Fiorentino lasting from 2000 until 2002. Between late 2002 and 2006, Terabust was director of the Corps de ballet at the Teatro di San Carlo. She returned as director of the Teatro dell'Opera Di Roma in September 2007, before stepping down from the role in January 2009 and was replaced by Makhar Vaziev. A biography on Terabust, Elisabetta Terabust l'assillo della perfezione, was published in 2013. She was honorary director of the Teatro dell'Opera di Roma in her later years. Terabust received the International Dance Award City of Rieti from the Rieti municipality in 2013; she was invited twice between 2011 from 2014 by the Piero Prize Fasciolo patron to be a juror in choosing the award winner.

== Death ==
Terabust died at her home close to the Campo de' Fiori in Rome on the morning of 5 February 2018 following a long illness. On 7 February, a chapel of rest was opened at the Teatro dell'Opera Di Roma's Dancing School between late morning and early afternoon. A funeral was held for Terabust on the same day at Rome's Artists' Church.

== Character and legacy ==
Roberta Bignardi of Campadidanza magazine wrote that Terabust was "A great dancer and more: a combative and tenacious woman, an attentive, cultured, extravagant artist with an acute critical intelligence. She was an interpreter of quality and high – sometimes very high – level". La Repubblica's Anna Bandettini described Terabust as "Beautiful, with a strong face, raven hair, pronounced temperament", and Brendan Fitzgerald of The New York Times described her as having "Huge eyes, dark hair, harmonious proportions and a radiant presence which illuminates the stage". In October 2019, the primary ballet rehearsal room of the Teatro dell'Opera Di Roma Dancing School was renamed from Sala Ballo A to Sala Elisabetta Terabust after Terabust.
