= Saint Titian =

Saint Titian may refer to:

- Titian of Brescia, 5th-century bishop
- Titian of Oderzo, 7th-century bishop
