= Titian (disambiguation) =

Titian (c. 1488/1490 – 1576) was an Italian Renaissance painter.

Titian may also refer to:

- Titian of Brescia, 5th-century bishop of Brescia
- Titian of Oderzo, 7th-century bishop of Oderzo
- Titian, a male given name notably borne by
  - Titian Ramsay Peale (1799–1885), American artist, naturalist, entomologist, and photographer
- Titian (crater), an impact crater on Mercury

== See also ==
- Titian hair
- Titian priests
- Titianus (disambiguation)
- Tiziano (disambiguation)
