= Tiziana =

Tiziana is an Italian feminine given name. The masculine form is Tiziano. Notable people with the name include:

- Flavia Titiana, Roman empress who ruled in 193 AD
- Tiziana Alagia (born 1973), Italian long-distance runner
- Tiziana Cantone, an Italian victim of cyberbullying
- Paola Tiziana Cruciani (born 1958), Italian actress, comedian and playwright
- Tiziana Domínguez (born 1985), Spanish fashion designer and artist
- Tiziana Lauri (born 1959), Italian ballerina
- Tiziana Lodato (born 1976), Italian film, stage and television actress
- Tiziana Nisini (born 1975), Italian politician
- Tiziana Pini (born 1958), Italian actress and television personality
- Tiziana Realini (born 1984), Swiss Olympic equestrian
- Tiziana Rivale (born 1960), Italian singer
- Tiziana Terranova, Italian theorist and activist in information technology
