= Fabio Grossi =

Fabio Grossi may refer to:

- Fabio Grossi (dancer) (born 1977), Italian dancer and ballet teacher
- Fabio Grossi (athlete) (born 1967), retired Italian sprinter who specialized in the 400 metres
