= Tizzano =

Tizzano is an Italian surname. Notable people with the surname include:

- Antonio Tizzano (born 1940), Italian former judge at the European Court of Justice
- Carlo Tizzano (born 2000), Australian rugby union player of Italian descent
- Davide Tizzano (1968–2025), Italian Olympic rower

== See also ==
- Tizzano Val Parma, a comune in the Italian Province of Parma
- Tiziano (given name), an Italian masculine given name
