= Regina Demina =

Particle physicist

Regina F. Demina
- Born: Russia
- Education: Novosibirsk State University, BA, 1985, MS, 1989; Northeastern University, PhD, 1994
- Scientific career
- Fields: Particle physics; Cosmology
- Workplaces: FermiLab; Kansas State University; University of Rochester
- Thesis: J/Ψ from chi Production in proton-antiproton Collisions at √s = 1.8 TeV (1994)
- Doctoral advisor: Stephen Reucroft

Regina Demina is a particle physicist, cosmologist, and professor at the University of Rochester. She was a part of the team that discovered the top quark in 1995. In 2024, she observed the first significant quantum entanglement persistence between unstable top quark antiquark pairs.

She was elected as a fellow of the American Physical Society in 2012.

== Education and early life ==
Demina grew up in Russia, where she took ballet lessons and dreamt of becoming a professional ballerina. While in high school, Demina said she had a very good physics teacher, and she realized she was looking forward to the days she had physics class instead of ballet.

After she graduated, Demina enrolled at Novosibirsk State University. She earned a Bachelor of Arts in Physics in 1985 and a Master of Science in Physics in 1988. She then immigrated to the United States to attend Northeastern University, where she earned a Doctor of Philosophy in physics in 1994.

== Research ==
Demina worked as a postdoctoral researcher at Fermilab before joining Kansas State University in 1999 as an assistant professor. In 2003, she joined the University of Rochester as an associate professor. She was promoted to the title of professor in 2007.

Demina's research integrates experimental particle physics and observational cosmology. She was on the team that discovered the top quark in 1995. She co-led the team that built the tracking device that discovered the Higgs boson and she leads the Compact Muon Solenoid (CMS) team at the Large Hadron Collider. She also co-leads a group working on the Dark Energy Spectroscopic Instrument (DESI) survey, where her team develops optical fiber instrumentation, analysis algorithms, and survey software to map the large-scale structure of the universe and probe dark energy’s role in cosmic expansion.

In 2024, the team Demina leads produced the first significant quantum entanglement persisting between unstable top quark–antiquark pairs over separations beyond light speed information transfer.

== Awards and honors ==
- Outstanding Junior Investigator, United States Department of Energy, 2001
- Fellow, American Physical Society, 2012

== Selected Publications ==
- Demina, Regina; Lykken, Joseph D.; Matchev, Konstantin T.; Nomerotski, Andrei (2000-07-12). "Top and bottom squark searches in run II of the Fermilab Tevatron". Physical Review D. 62 (3) 035011. arXiv:hep-ph/9910275. Bibcode:2000PhRvD..62c5011D. doi:10.1103/PhysRevD.62.035011. ISSN 0556-2821.
- Demina, Regina; Cheong, Sanha; BenZvi, Segev; Hindrichs, Otto (2018-10-11). "A computationally efficient approach for calculating galaxytwo-point correlations". Monthly Notices of the Royal Astronomical Society. 480 (1): 49–56. arXiv:1611.09892. doi:10.1093/mnras/sty1812. ISSN 0035-8711.
- Demina, Regina; Landi, Gabriel (2025-01-29). "Locality in collider tests of quantum mechanics with top quark pairs". Physical Review D. 111 (1) 012013. arXiv:2407.15223. Bibcode:2025PhRvD.111a2013D. doi:10.1103/PhysRevD.111.012013. ISSN 2470-0010.
- Demina, Regina; Jepsen, Kathryn (2024-09-24). "Explain it in 60 Seconds: Quantum entanglement". Symmetry Magazine.
