= Tiziano (given name) =

Tiziano is an Italian masculine given name. The feminine form is Tiziana. Tiziano may refer to:

- St. Tiziano of Brescia, 5th century bishop of Brescia
- St. Tiziano of Oderzo, 7th century bishop of Oderzo
- Tiziano Aspetti (circa 1557–1606), Italian sculptor
- Tiziano Bruzzone (born 1984), Italian footballer
- Tiziano Dall'Antonia (born 1983), Italian professional road bicycle racer
- Tiziano Ferro (born 1980), Italian singer
- Tiziano Fratus (born 1975), Italian poet
- Tiziano Polenghi (born 1978), Italian footballer
- Tiziano Sclavi (born 1953), Italian comic book author
- Tiziano Terzani (1938–2004), Italian journalist
- Tiziano Vecelli (circa 1485–1576), Italian painter
