= Marina Svetlova =

French and American ballerina

Marina Svetlova (born Yvette von Hartmann; 3 May 1922 – 11 February 2009) was a French and American ballerina and ballet instructor.

== Biography ==
Svetlova was born in Paris, France, with the name Yvette von Hartmann to Russian parents. She began studying dance as a young child and made her professional debut as a child performer in Paris in 1931 with the experimental ballet troupe of Ida Rubinstein. In Paris, she studied under Vera Trefilova, Lubov Egorova, and various other Russian emigres. In her late teens she became a soloist with the Original Ballet Russe, dancing with that company for three seasons. While there she notably created roles in David Lichine's Graduation Ball and George Balanchine's Balustrade.

After leaving the Ballet Russe, Svetlova came to the United States to dance as a guest artist with the American Ballet Theatre in New York City. She then joined the Metropolitan Opera Ballet, where she appeared for seven seasons, beginning in 1943–44. In 1951 she danced with the New York City Opera Ballet as a featured soloist for one season. From 1944 to 1969 Svetlova led her own touring dance concert group and made guest appearances in Europe with Guido Lauri.

Svetlova's accomplishments as a ballerina were later eclipsed by her second career as a dance teacher and choreographer at the Southern Vermont Arts Center (1959–64); the Svetlova Dance Center in Dorset, VT (1965–95); and Indiana University where she was professor of ballet and chairwoman of the ballet department (1969–92). She died in Bloomington, Indiana in 2009.
