= Tiziana Lauri =

Italian ballerina

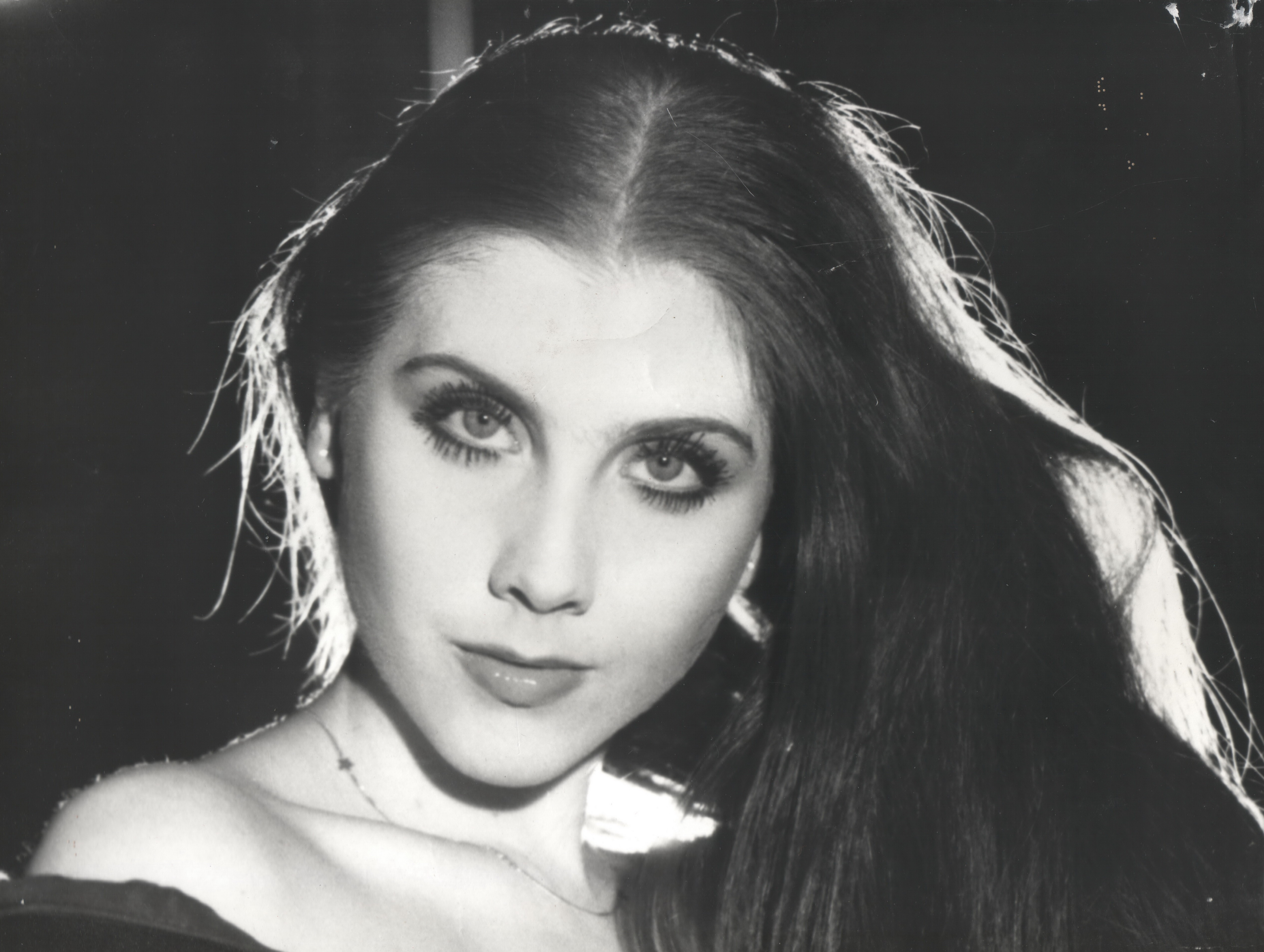
- Tiziana Lauri (by Torres)
- Born: Rome, Italy
- Education: Teatro dell'Opera di Roma
- Occupations: Prima Ballerina on stage and screen
- Years active: 1975–2011
- Spouse: Fabio Grossi

Tiziana Lauri is a retired Italian ballet dancer.

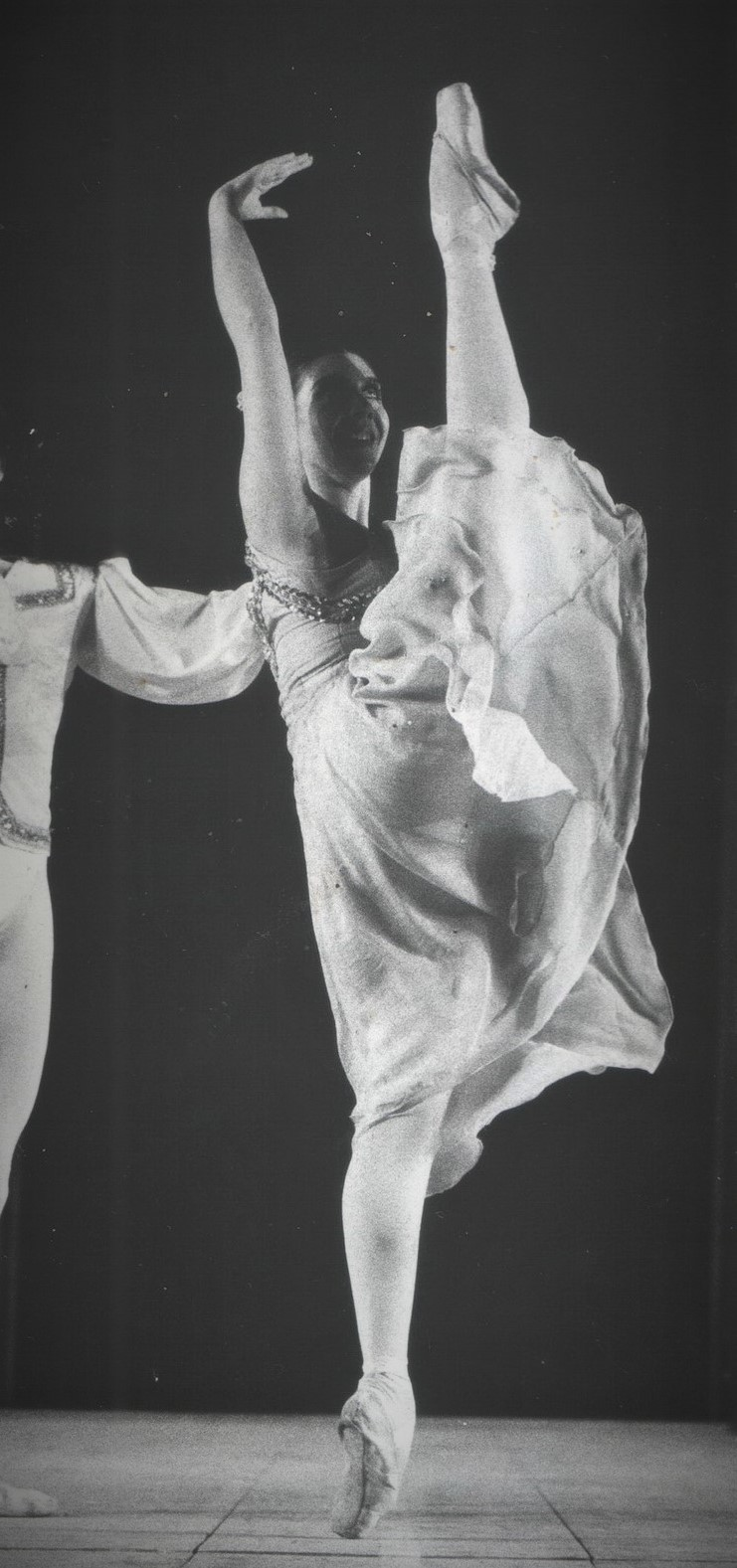
Miss Lauri in George Balanchine's Tschaikovsky Pas de Deux.

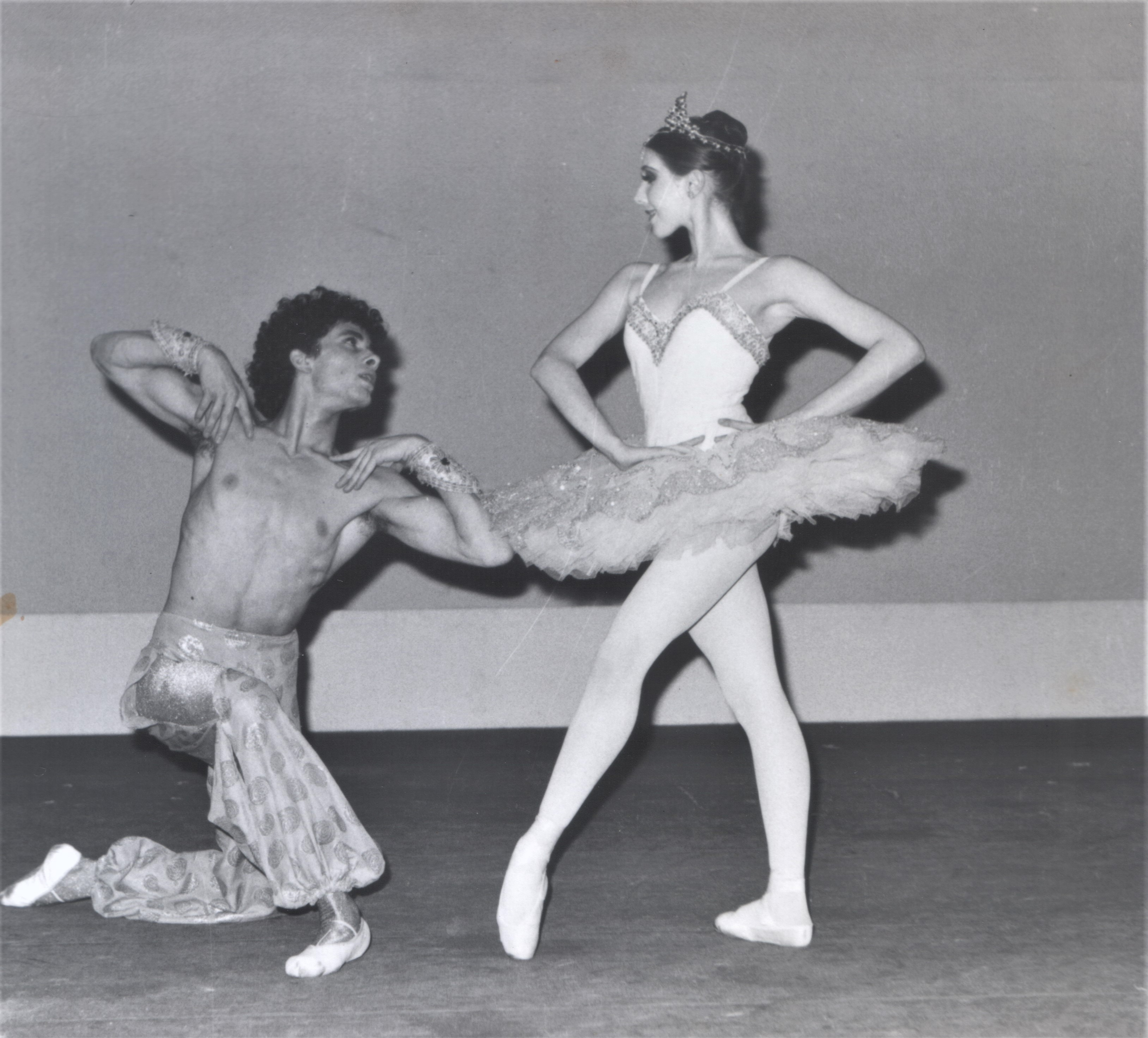
With her cousin Raffaele Paganini.

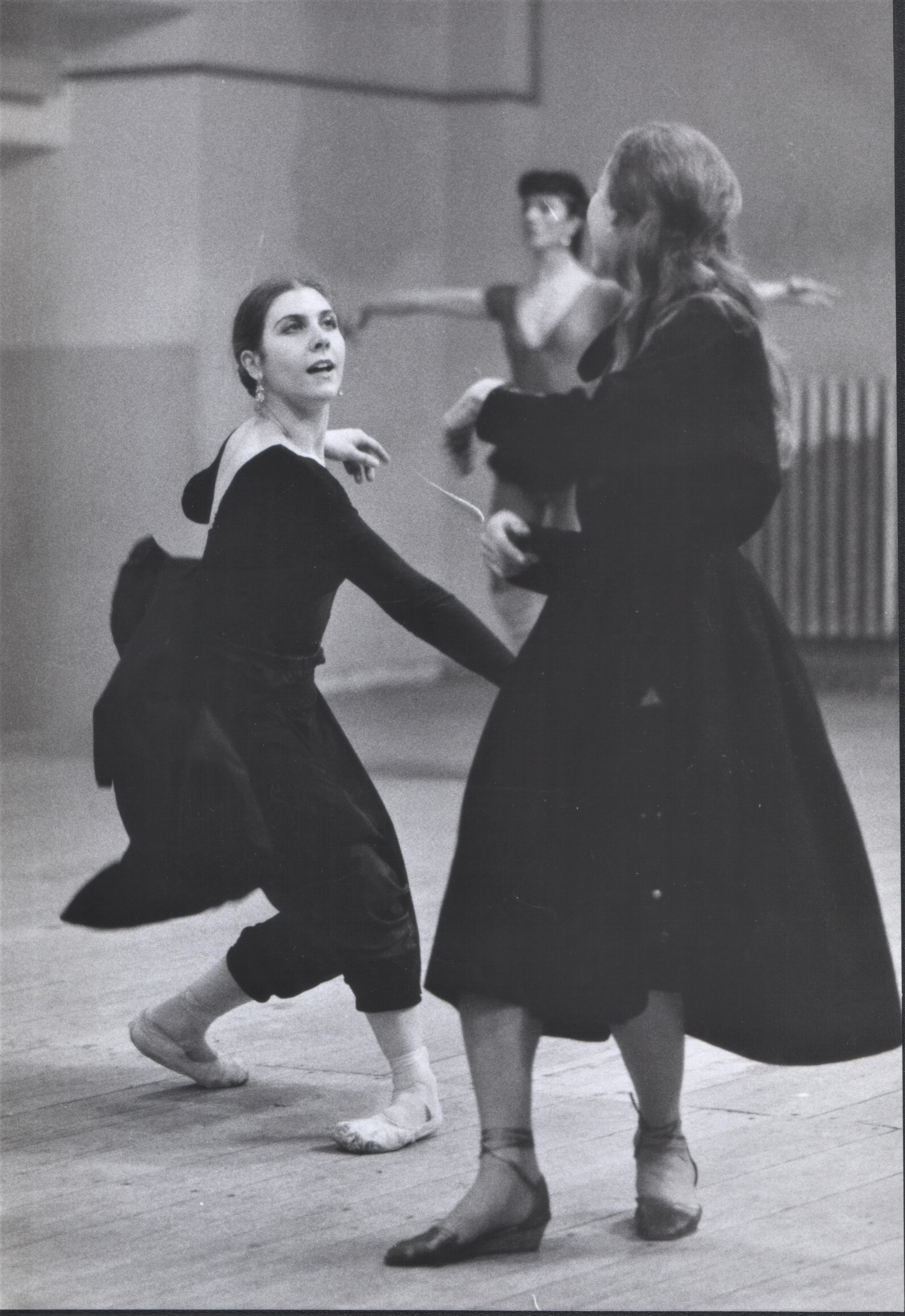
With Maya Plisetskaya during the creation of a new Raymonda.

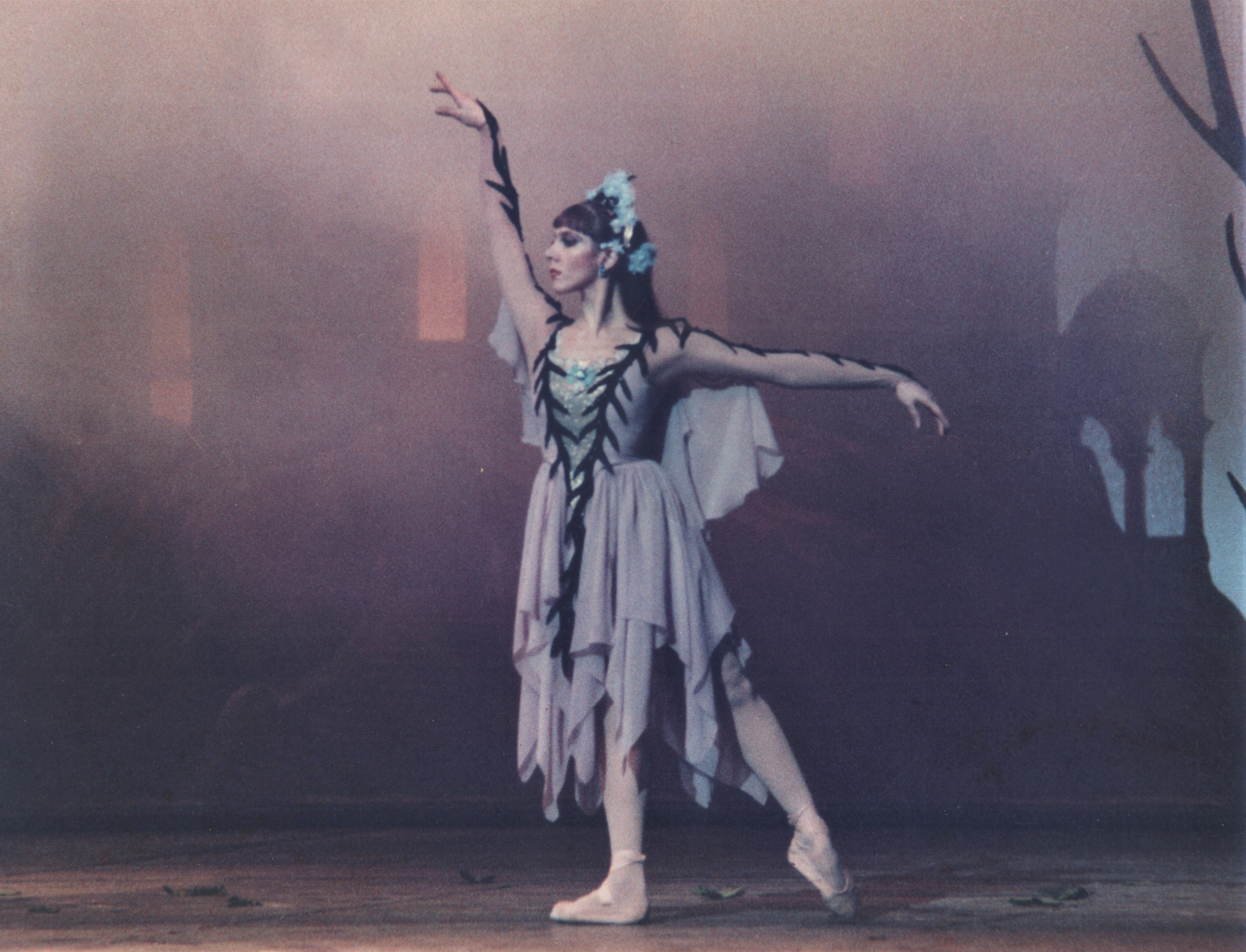
As Fairy Winter in Ben Stevenson (dancer)'s Cinderella.

== Early life and education ==
Daughter of noted dancers Guido Lauri and Anna Maria Paganini, she followed in her parents's footsteps (although against their will) by training with Attilia Radice at the Rome Opera House. She entered the Rome Opera Ballet school at age 13, without having taken any previous dance classes.

== Dancing career ==
After less than three years at the Rome Opera Ballet school, she joined the Rome Opera Ballet company, becoming a soloist at the age of 18.

A celebrated ballet artist, She danced a wide range of Ballerina roles from Kitri in Don Quixote to Juliet in Romeo and Juliet.

She worked with a variety of personalities such as Rudolf Nureyev, André Prokovsky, Ekaterina Maximova, Vladimir Vasiliev, Patrick Dupond and many others.

== TV career ==
Lauri often appeared on Italian television as a performer, anchorwoman, and interviewer.

== Awards ==
Lauri was a recipient of the Gold medal at Carlo Blasis 1981 competition in Turin and of various prizes (Apollon Musagète 1986, Golden Perseus 1987, Michelangelo's David 1988, Talenti dello Spettacolo Internazionale 1989, and Berlin's Golden Bear and Cup 1990).

== Family ==
In 1987, American review Dance Magazine wrote about her unusual kinship with several artists: four cousins were her colleagues, and two paternal aunts, a paternal uncle and a maternal aunt and uncle were all Rome Opera Ballet dancers of the older generation. Her genealogical tree also includes grandfather Eliseo Paganini, a world-champion athlete, and famed opera singer Giulio Neri, her uncle.

== Sources ==
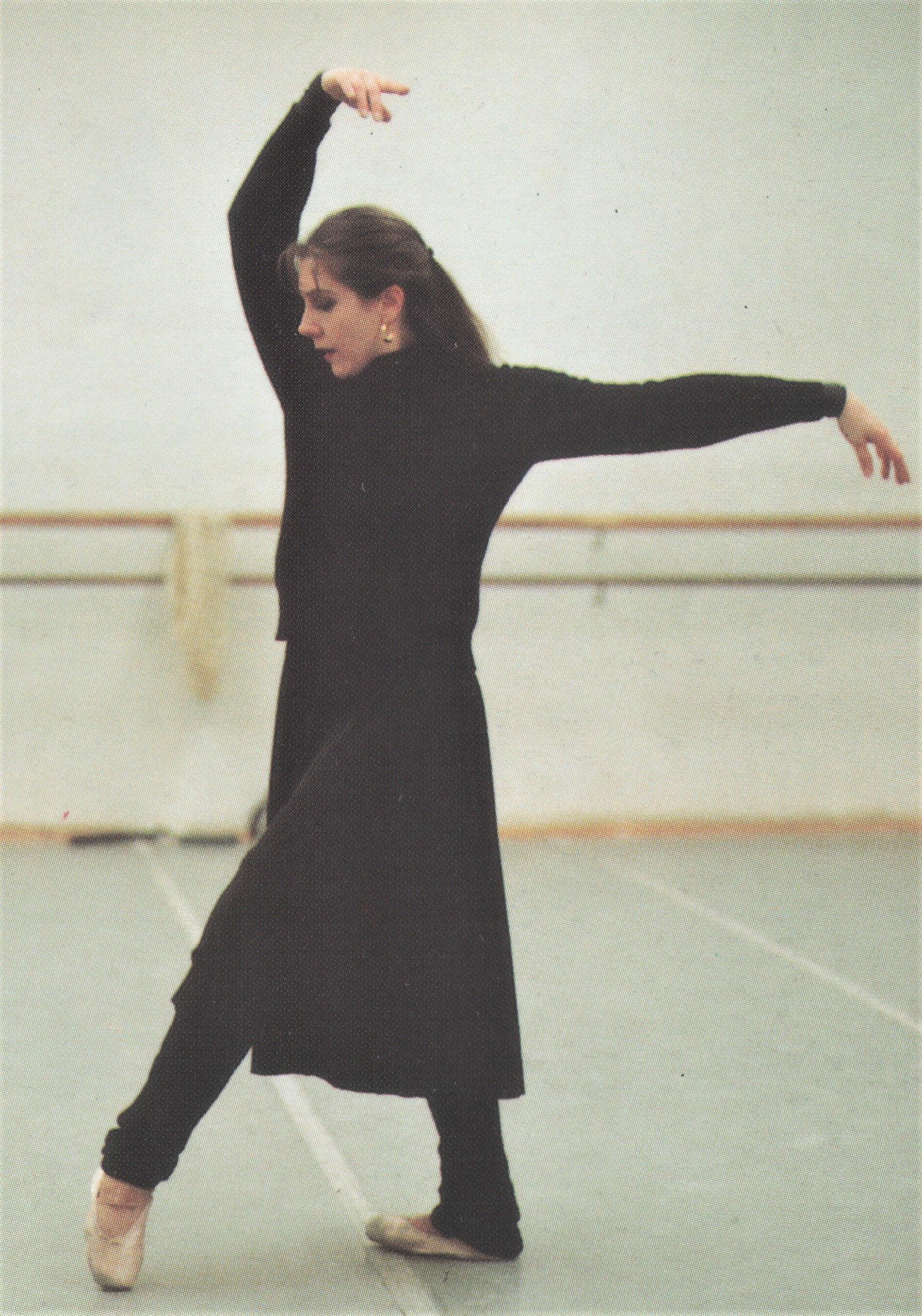
Rehearsing Robert North's Orlando.

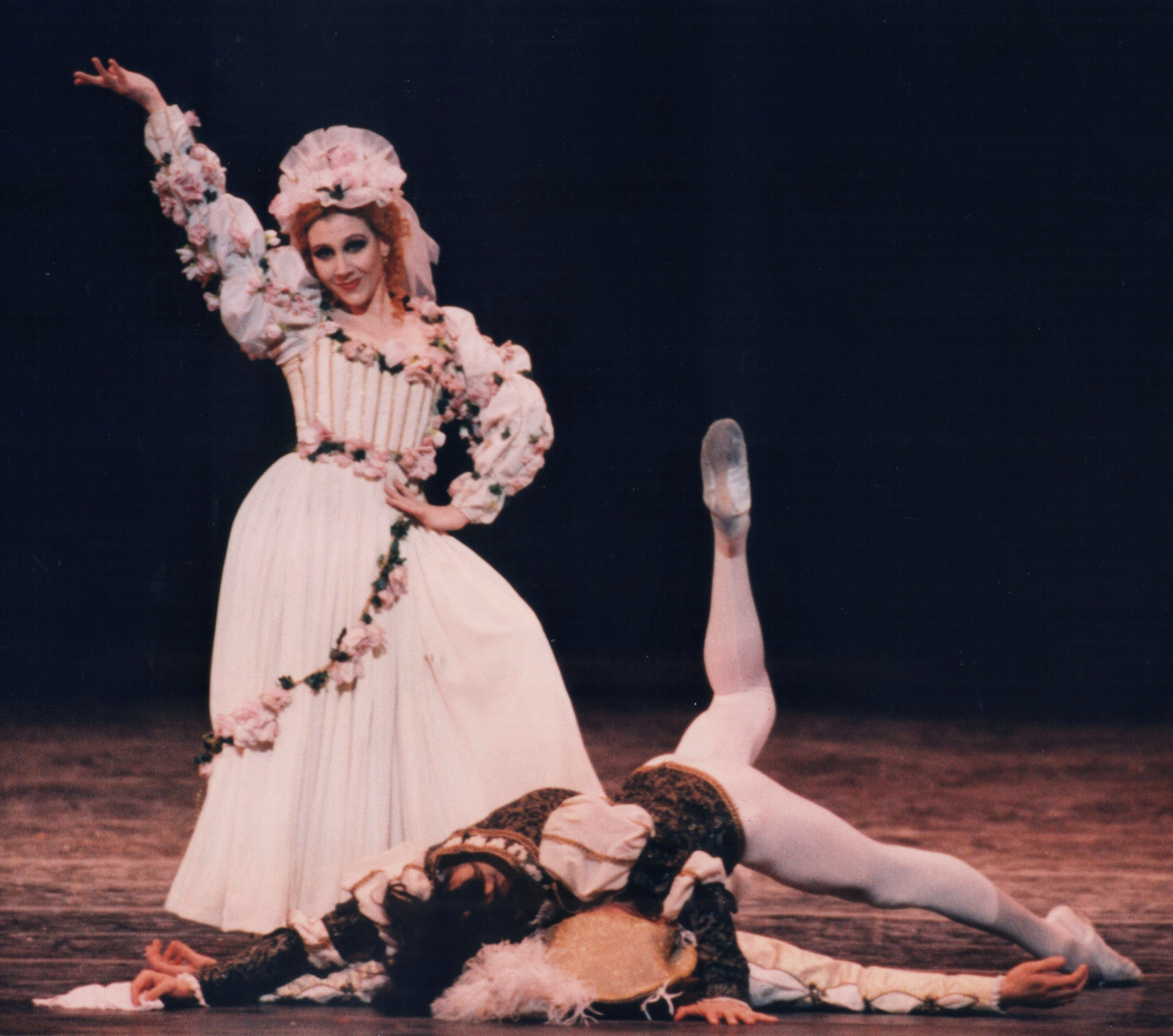
With Maximiliano Guerra in John Cranko's The Taming of the Shrew.

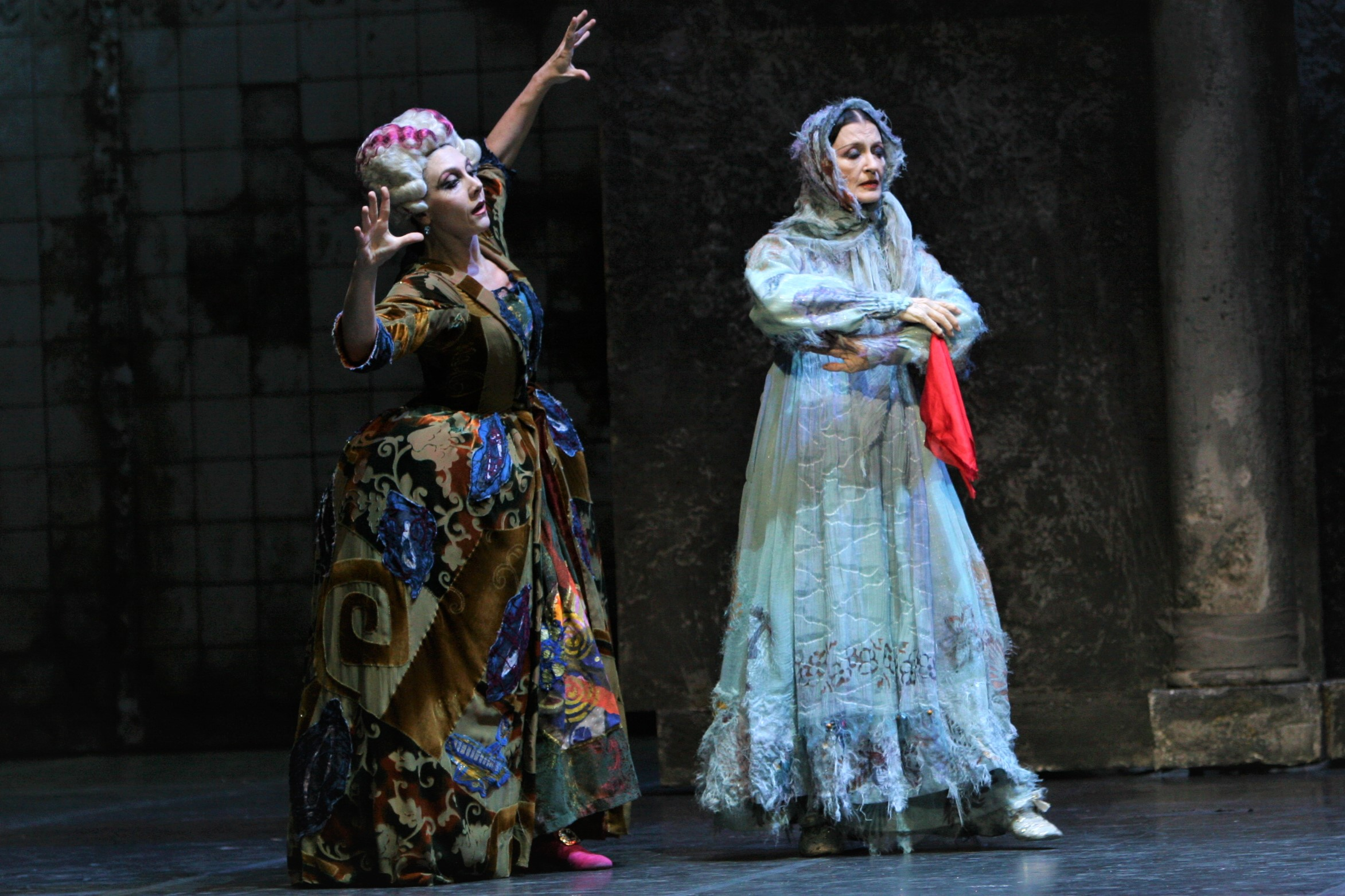
As the Stepmother in Alfred Rodrigues's Cinderella, with Carla Fracci as the Fairy Godmother.

- WHO'S WHO IN THE WORLD, Sixth Edition 1982/83 U.S.A.
- DANCE MAGAZINE, "Rome Opera Ballet's talented première danseuse", April 1987.
- CHI E' DELLA DANZA IN ITALIA, L'Arabesque editrice (1992).
- TIZIANA LAURI: "Noi tutti dobbiamo imparare a corporizzare lo spirito e a spiritualizzare il corpo" - interview, 23/09/11 giornale della danza.com.
- TIZIANA LAURI: Archivio Storico e Audio-Visuale del Teatro dell'Opera di Roma Capitale (partial list).
