= Eva Evdokimova =

American dancer (1948–2009)

- Born: December 1, 1948; Geneva, Switzerland
- Died: April 3, 2009 (aged 60); New York City, U.S.
- Education: Royal Ballet School
- Occupation: dancer
- Years active: 1966–2005
- Spouse: Michael S. Gregori
- Dancing career
- Former groups: Berlin Opera Ballet, Royal Danish Ballet, London Festival Ballet

Eva Maria Evdokimova-Gregori (December 1, 1948 – April 3, 2009) was an American Prima Ballerina Assoluta with the Royal Danish, Berlin Opera Ballets, English National Ballet and guest artist with virtually every major ballet company worldwide.

== Early life ==
Born in Geneva, Switzerland, to Evdokim Evdokimov, a stateless Bulgarian-American father (1919-2008), and American mother, Thora Mary Hatten (1914–1991). Evdokimova, an American citizen from birth, began her ballet studies as a child in Munich. She later attended the Royal Ballet School in London, where she studied for several years under the direction of Maria Fay. In 1966, she became the first non-Danish dancer to join the Royal Danish Ballet, where she continued her studies under Vera Volkova.

== Career ==
In 1969, she graduated into the Berlin Opera Ballet, where she danced her first Giselle in 1971. She was promoted to prima ballerina in 1973, a position she held for 12 years. For many years she was also the leading ballerina of the London Festival Ballet (now English National Ballet), where she was chosen by Rudolf Nureyev to dance the first Princess Aurora in his production of The Sleeping Beauty with the company in 1975.

Throughout her career, she danced with virtually every major international ballet company including the Kirov Ballet, where she was coached by Natalia Dudinskaya, the American Ballet Theatre, and the Paris Opera Ballet. She was frequently paired with Nureyev. Their partnership lasted more than 15 years and they performed hundreds of times together.

After a performance with the Kirov Ballet, she was awarded the title "Prima Ballerina Assoluta." Subsequently, she was billed that way internationally. In addition to her interpretations of the tragic heroines of the Romantic era, namely Giselle and La Sylphide, her repertoire encompassed about 150 roles ranging from classical to contemporary works. The last dance created for her (by choreographer Henning Rübsam) in 2002, prompted New York Times critic Jennifer Dunning to comment, "Both the solo and her performance were celebrations of the kind of artistry that comes only with maturity and experience."

The first American to win any international ballet competition, Evdokimova won the Varna International Ballet Competition in 1970. She was awarded the charter Ulanova Prize in 2005 for "selfless dedication to the art of dance".

In New York, she studied acting at HB Studio.

== Later life ==
Evdokimova later became a dance teacher and ballet mistress at the Boston Ballet and judged numerous international ballet competitions. There are numerous clips of her performances on YouTube although not remastered.

== Death ==
She died on April 3, 2009, aged 60, from complications of cancer in Manhattan, New York, according to her husband, Michael S. Gregori. She was survived by Gregori and her brother, Boris Santini. After her death, Gregori remained in the Sutton Place apartment where he had cared for her. His mother, Katherine Gregori, later sought to evict him, alleging that he had changed the locks and kept her from returning. Michael disputed her claims..

== Final resting place ==
As of 2019, the final resting place of her remains is currently unknown, according to the New York Post.
