= Prima ballerina assoluta =

Title awarded to the most notable of female ballet dancers

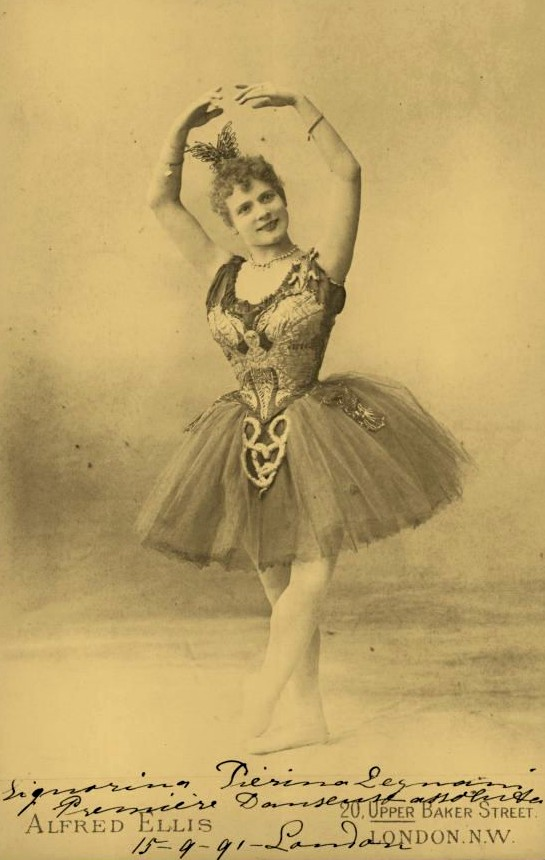
Pierina Legnani – the first ballerina ever to be titled prima ballerina assoluta – photographed during her tour of London, 1891. Written on the photo is Signorina Pierina Legnani, Première danseuse assoluta. 15-9-91 – London.

Prima ballerina assoluta is a title awarded to the most notable of female ballet dancers. To be recognised as a prima ballerina assoluta is a rare honour, traditionally reserved for the most exceptional dancers of their generation. Originally inspired by the Italian ballet masters of the early Romantic ballet and literally meaning 'absolute first ballerina', the title was bestowed on prima ballerinas who were considered exceptionally talented, performing to a higher standard than other leading ballerinas.

The title is rarely applied to dancers today. Recent titles have not been awarded, although some ballerinas have been regarded worthy of the title symbolically. Reasons for granting have included public recognion and praise for a prestigious international career, and for giving 'exceptional service' to their ballet company. Currently, no universal procedure or common criteria exists for ballet companies to determine whether to grant this title to a dancer. This has led to disputes and conflict amongst those in the ballet community concerning what standards are required to legitimately claim the 'assoluta' moniker.

Usually, ballet companies are responsible for determining to grant, then bestow, the 'assoluta' title. In some cases, however, the title is sanctioned or awarded by a government or head of state, thus giving it official status. Unfortunately, some of these awards are used as a political tool rather than being awarded for legitimate artistic achievement. It is also possible (but rare) for a dancer to be awarded 'prima ballerina assoluta' status as a result of prevailing public opinion and critical acclaim.

== History ==
The first recorded use of the title as a company rank was in 1894, when French ballet master Marius Petipa bestowed it on Italian ballerina Pierina Legnani. He considered her to be the supreme leading ballerina in all of Europe.

The second ballerina to be given the title was Legnani's contemporary Mathilde Kschessinska, in 1895. Petipa, however, did not agree that she should hold such a title; although an extraordinary ballerina, he felt that she obtained the title primarily via her connections with the Imperial Russian court, as she had an affair with Nicholas II, as well as two other Romanovs (Grand Duke Sergei Mikhailovich and her future husband Grand Duke Andrei Vladimirovich).

Legnani's heir in the Italian ballet tradition, Attilia Radice trained with Enrico Cecchetti at La Scala in Milan where she became a leading dancer and was appointed prima ballerina assoluta at Teatro dell'Opera di Roma in 1935.

The only Soviet ballerinas to hold the title were Galina Ulanova, acclaimed as prima ballerina assoluta in 1944, and Maya Plisetskaya in 1960.

The Swiss-born American Eva Evdokimova became recognised as a prima ballerina assoluta following guest appearances with the Kirov Ballet in the 1970s, when she was named as such by the company ballet mistress, Natalia Dudinskaya. The title was later recognised by a vote of the Senate of Berlin.

Other dancers awarded the title include Alicia Alonso from Cuba, Alessandra Ferri from Italy (in 1992), and Alicia Markova and Margot Fonteyn (in 1979), both from England.

The only French dancer to hold the title is Yvette Chauviré.

Though the U.S. has no process for designation of the title, Rudolf Nureyev referred to the American ballerina Cynthia Gregory of the American Ballet Theatre as the nation's prima ballerina assoluta; however this has never been formally acknowledged. Another not to hold the title is Anna Pavlova, one of the best known ballerinas in history.

In South Africa, the only ballerina granted the title prima ballerina assoluta (in 1984) was Phyllis Spira (1943–2008).

== Honorees ==
| No | Name | Nationality | Notes |
|---|---|---|---|
| 1 | Pierina Legnani | Italian | Appointed Prima Ballerina Assoluta of the Mariinsky Ballet at the request of Marius Petipa. |
| 2 | Matylda Krzesińska | Polish / Russian | Appointed Prima Ballerina Assoluta of the Mariinsky Ballet, allegedly due to her connections with the Imperial Russian Court. Petipa is known to have attempted to block her promotion. |
| 3 | Alicia Markova | British | No record of the title being officially sanctioned; however, she is credited as a Prima Ballerina Assoluta in numerous sources. She is also credited as such by English National Ballet, of which she was co-founder and by the Royal Ballet of London, of which she was the first Prima Ballerina. |
| 4 | Attilia Radice | Italian | Trained at La Scala under Enrico Cecchetti, she was appointed Prima Ballerina Assoluta at Rome Opera House in 1935. Retired in 1957, she held the position of Director of the ballet school at Rome Opera House until 1975. |
| 5 | Galina Ulanova | Russian | The first dancer to be appointed Prima Ballerina Assoluta by the Soviet Government, following her transfer to the Bolshoi Ballet. |
| 6 | Alicia Alonso | Cuban | No record of the title being officially sanctioned, however she is credited as a Prima Ballerina Assoluta in numerous sources, including the Cuban National Ballet, of which she is the founder. |
| 7 | Maria Tallchief | Native American | Prima Ballerina Assoluta of New York City Ballet NYCB from 1945-55. Native American record breaker, Tallchief was the first American ballerina to be awarded the title. When her career began taking off she was pressured to change her name to Maria Tallchieva to appear more Russian but she refused in solidarity with her roots. She was later inducted into the National Women's Hall of Fame. |
| 8 | Maya Plisetskaya | Russian | Appointed Prima Ballerina Assoluta of the Bolshoi Ballet by the Soviet Government, as successor to Galina Ulanova. |
| 9 | Eva Evdokimova | American | Was named Prima Ballerina Assoluta by the ballet mistress of the Kirov Ballet, following guest appearances with the company in the 1970s. The title was later sanctioned by the Senate of Berlin. |
| 10 | Margot Fonteyn | British | Appointed Prima Ballerina Assoluta of the Royal Ballet in 1979, as a gift for her 60th birthday. The title was also sanctioned by Queen Elizabeth II as patron of the company. |
| 11 | Yvette Chauviré | French | 20th century. |
| 12 | Phyllis Spira | South African | The title was bestowed upon her by the president of South Africa in 1984. |
| 13 | Alessandra Ferri | Italian | 1992 |

== Gallery ==
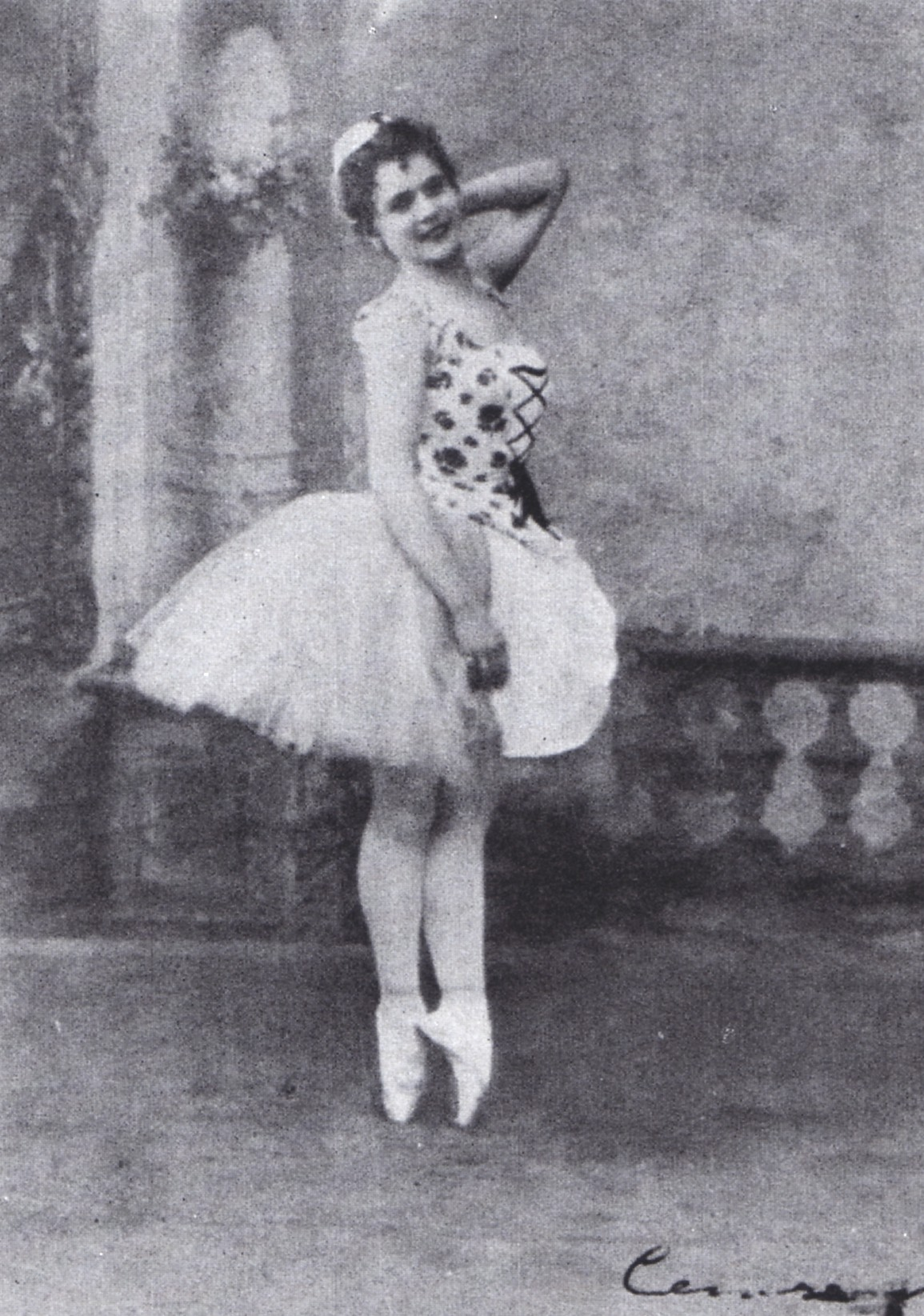
Pierina Legnani, in 1893.

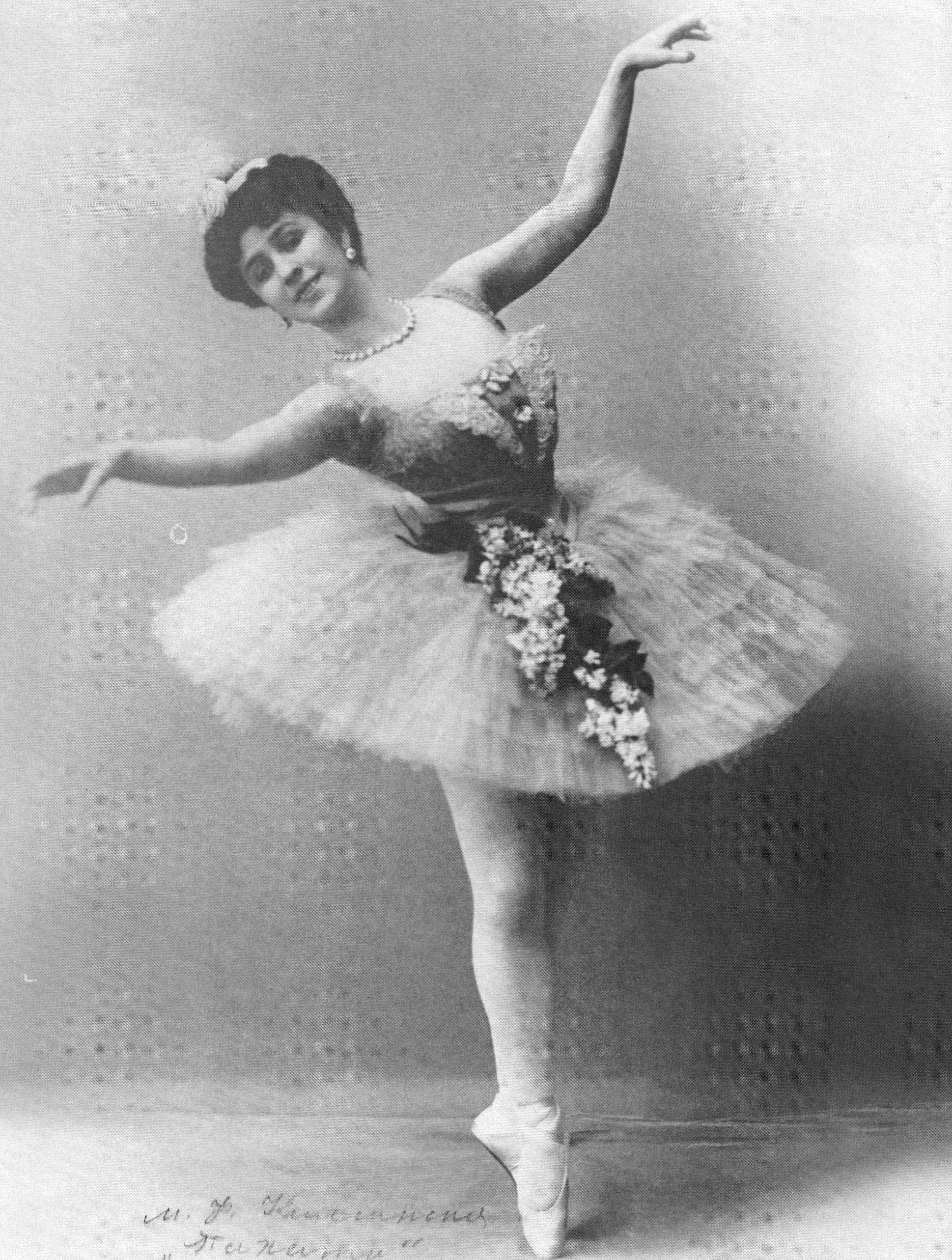
Matylda Krzesińska, in 1909.

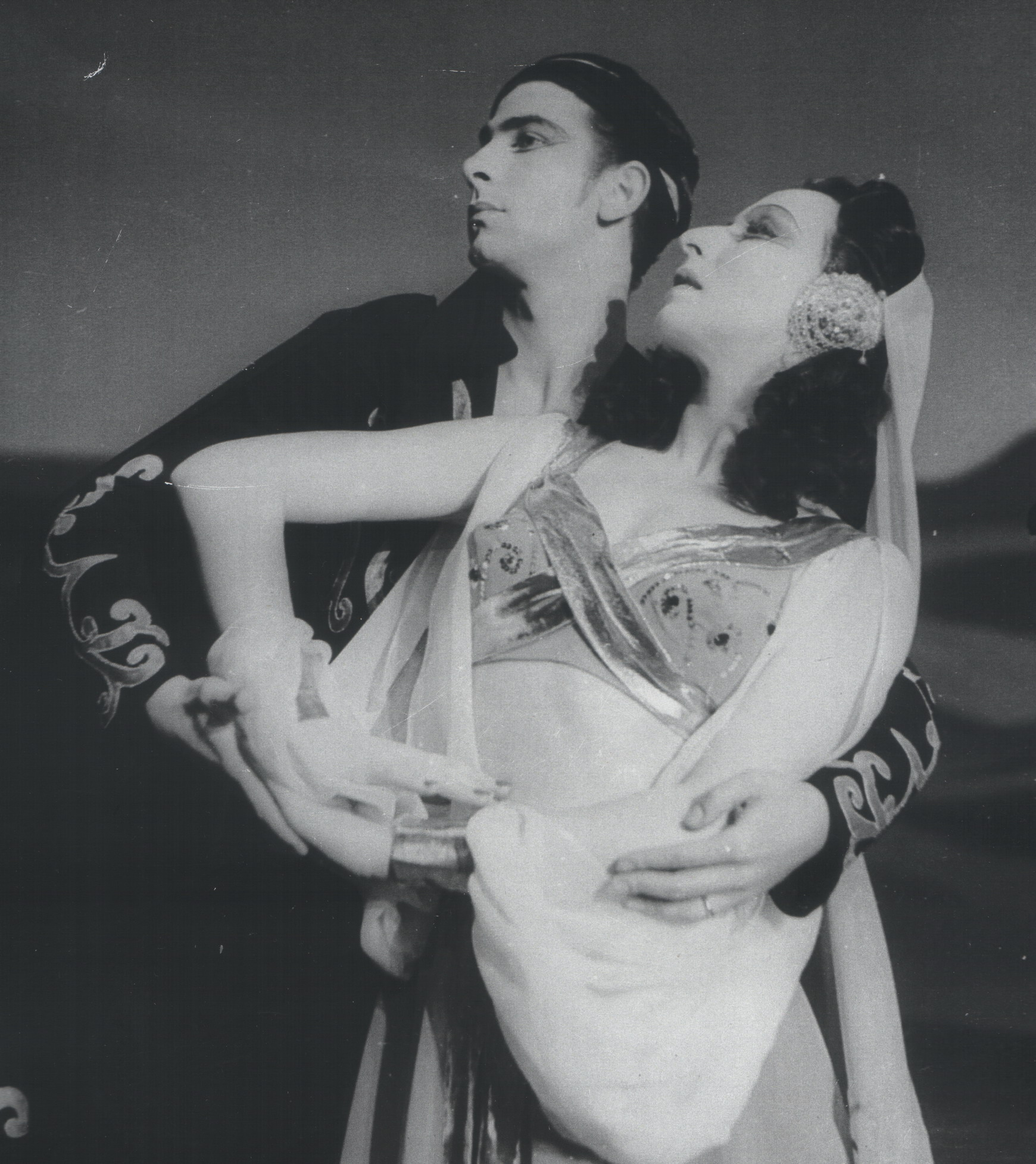
Attilia Radice, 1950s (photo with Guido Lauri).

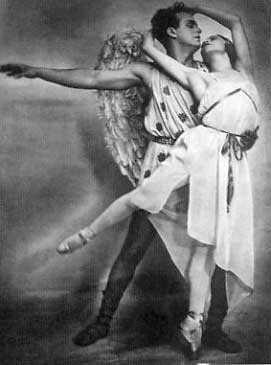
Galina Ulanova, in 1923 (with Mikhail Dudko).

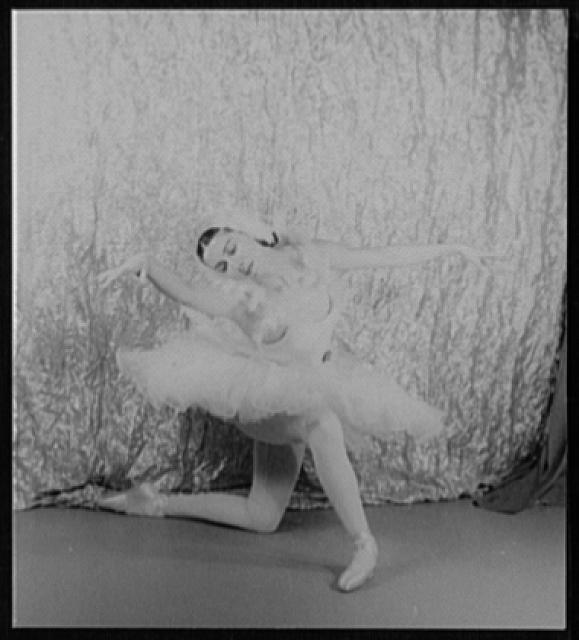
Alicia Markova, in 1948.

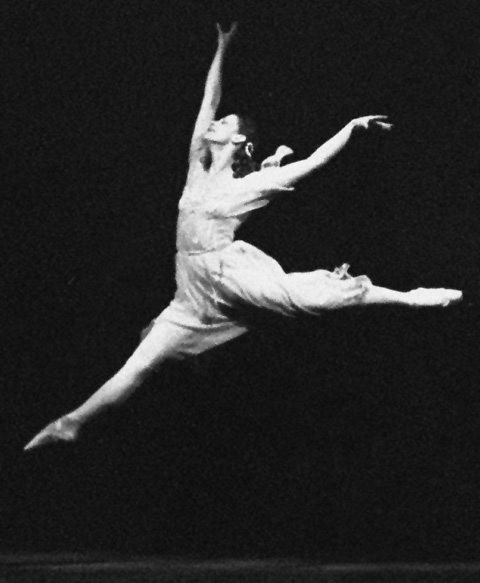
Maya Plisetskaya, in 1961.

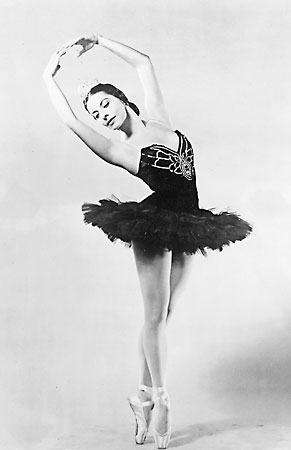
Alicia Alonso, in 1955.

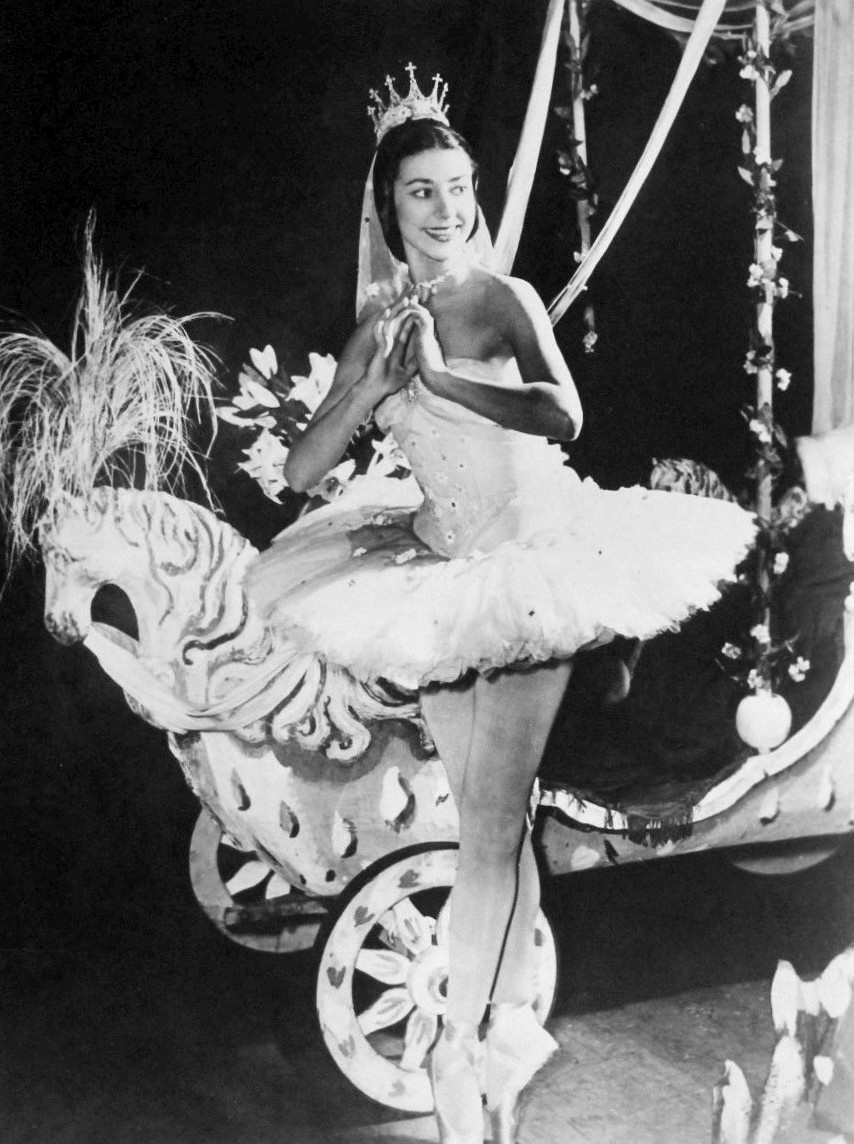
Margot Fonteyn, in 1957.

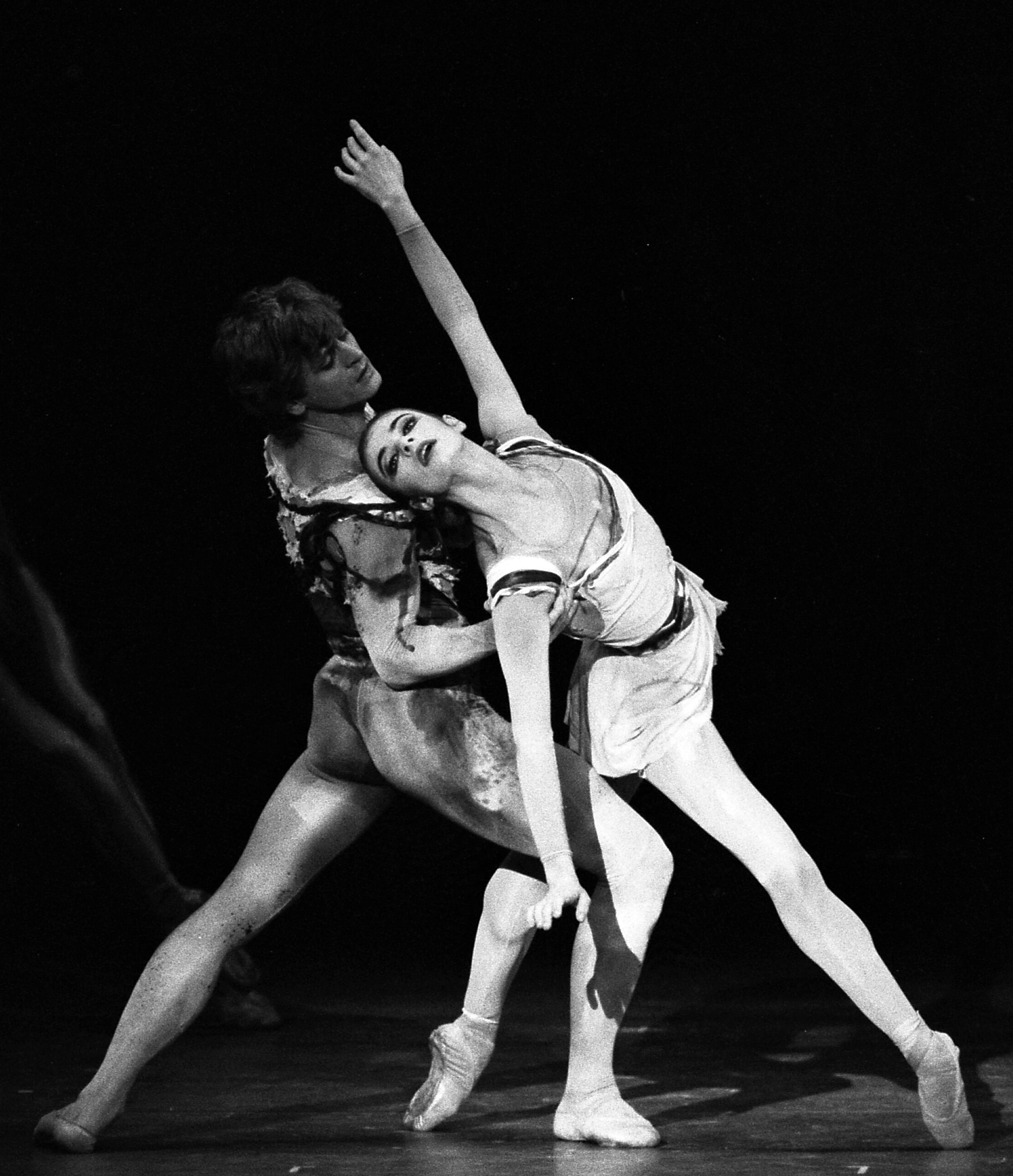
Alessandra Ferri, 1986 (with Mikhail Baryshnikov).

== See also ==
- Glossary of ballet
- Ballet dancer
- List of prima ballerinas
- List of dancers
