= Tiziano (disambiguation) =

Tiziano was the leading painter of the 16th-century Venetian school of the Italian Renaissance.

Tiziano may also refer to:

- 9905 Tiziano, a main belt asteroid
- Tiziano (given name), an Italian masculine given name
