= Fabio Grossi (dancer) =

Italian dancer and ballet teacher (born 1977)

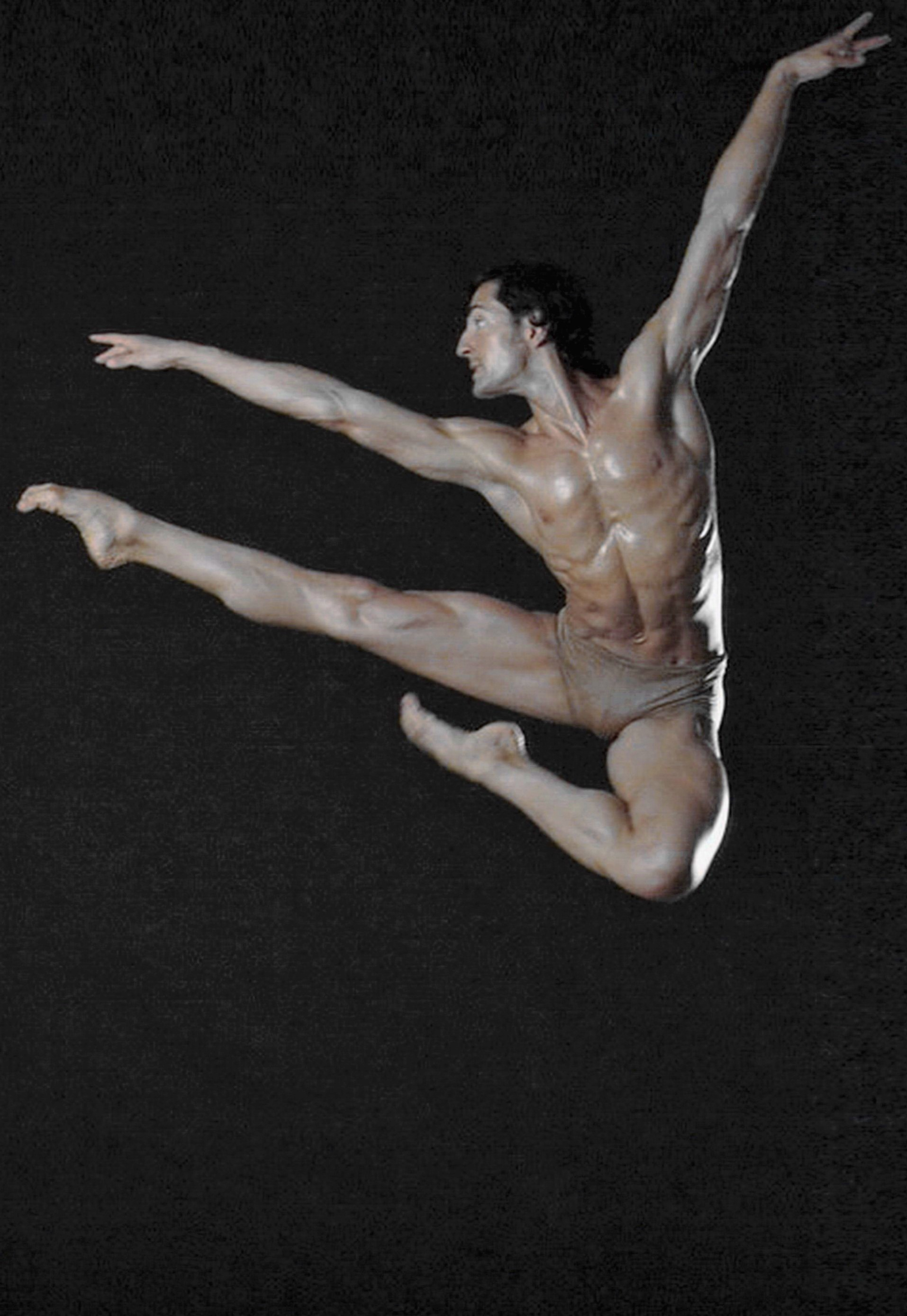
- Born: Fabio Grossi; 1 October 1977 (age 48); Rome, Italy
- Occupations: Ballet dancer, Ballet teacher.
- Years active: 1997-2008 (performing), 2008-2016 (teaching).
- Spouse: Tiziana Lauri
- Awards: Gold medal Rieti/Spoleto competition, Moscow diploma, Premio Positano, Premio Anita Bucchi.

Fabio Grossi (born 1 October 1977, in Rome) is a retired Italian dancer and ballet teacher.

== Early life ==
He trained at the Accademia nazionale di danza in Rome, where he graduated with full marks.

He studied all over Europe with many international teachers including Marika Besobrasova, Rosella Hightower, Patricia Carey, Wilhelm Burmann, Philip Beamish, Raymond Franchetti.

== Performing career ==
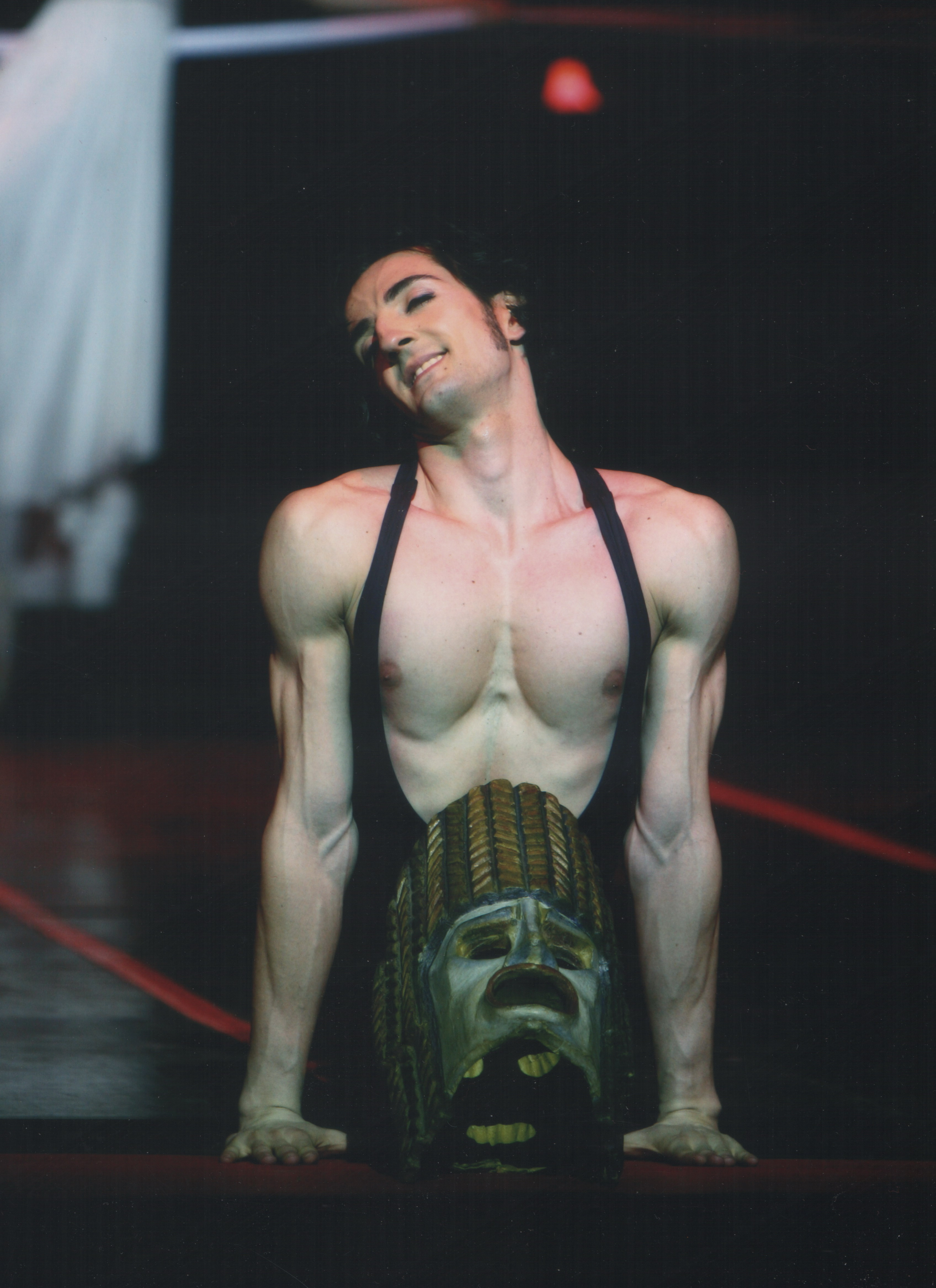
As Mephisto in Faust at Rome Opera House in 2006

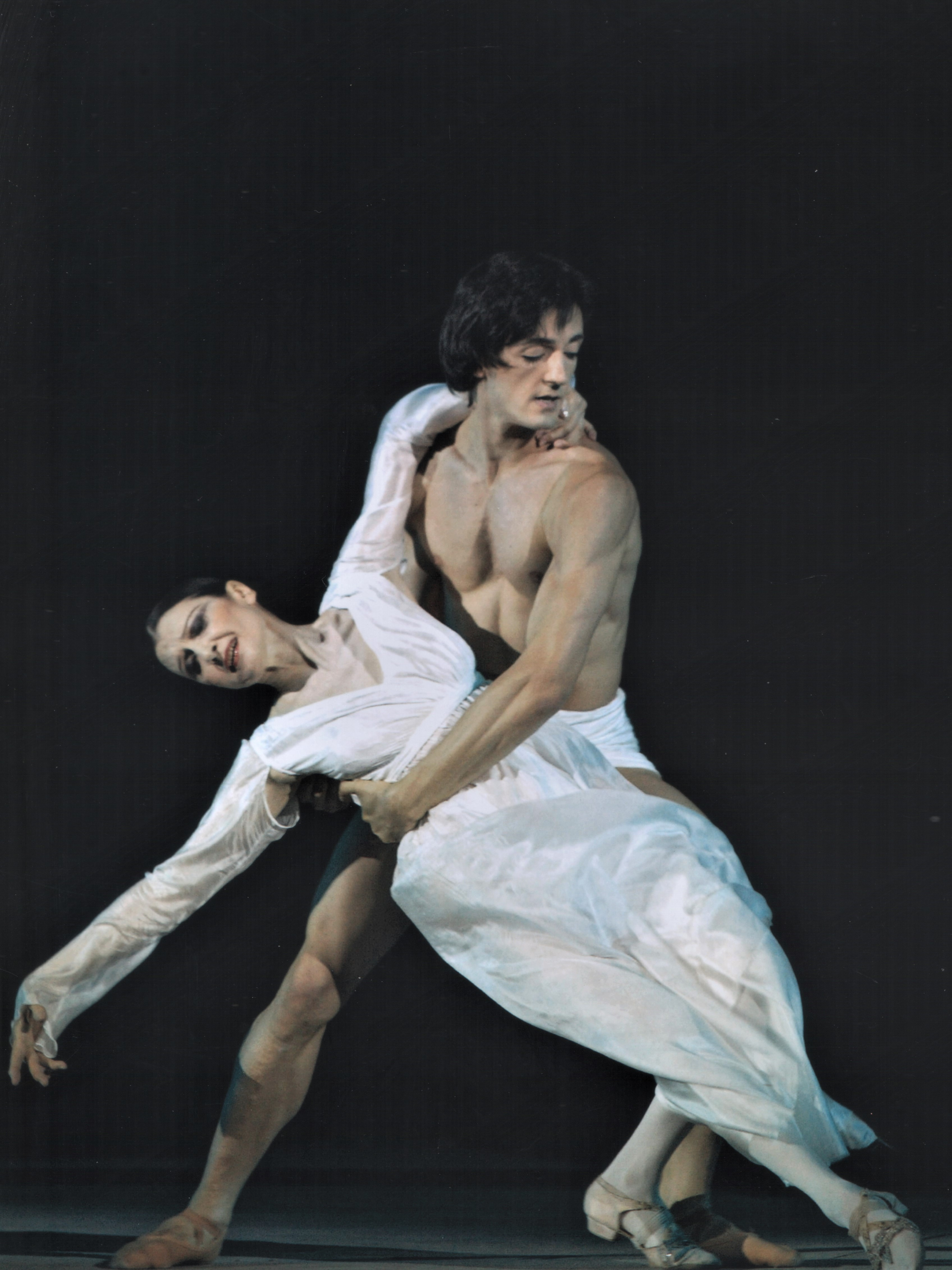
A pas de deux with Carla Fracci at her 70th birthday's celebration

At age 19, Grossi was a First Prize Winner at the Rieti Dance Competition in Italy and the only Italian to be a Finalist and a Diploma Winner at the 1997 Moscow International Ballet Competition in Russia, which was directed by Yuri Grigorovich.

On 11 October 1997 he made his debut as a Soloist with Aterballetto (Italy). Then he successively joined:

- the Grand Théatre de Genève,
- the Leipziger Ballett,
- the Teatro alla Scala in Milan and
- the Ballet National de Marseille.

From 2003 to 2007, he has been one of the leading dancers of the Teatro dell'Opera di Roma performing as partner of Italian Ballerina Carla Fracci.

On 11 May 2008 he danced his farewell performance as a Guest Artist of the Arena di Verona, with the role of Albrecht in Giselle at the Teatro Filarmonico.

== Choreographic repertory ==
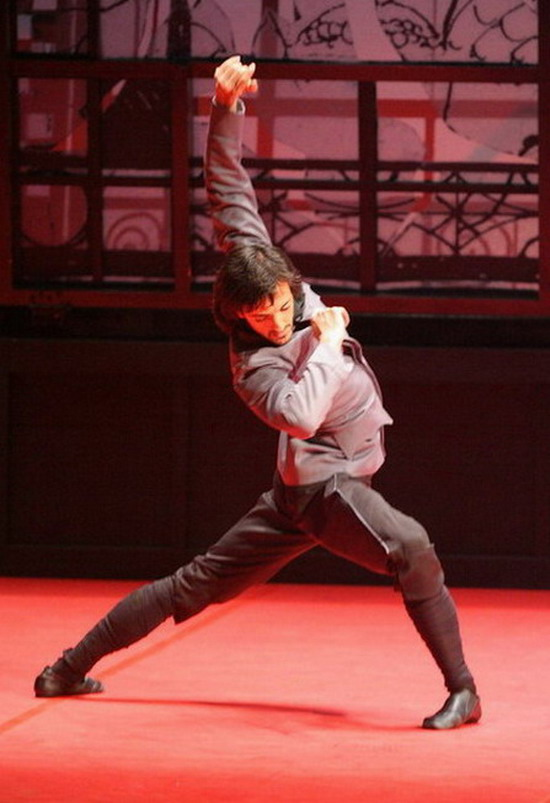
Dancing in a ballet inspired by Georg Trakl's poetry at Rome Opera House in 2007

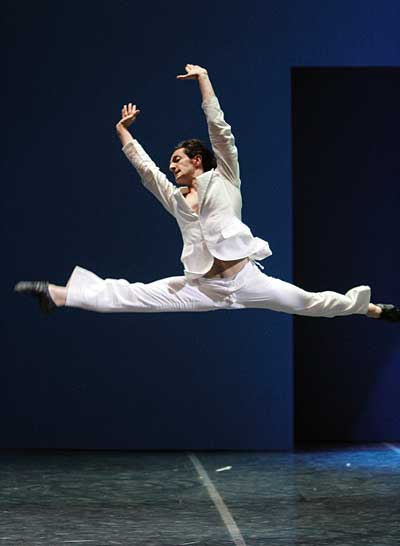
As Tommaso de' Cavalieri in Michelangelo at Rome Opera House in 2007

As a Principal Dancer, Grossi's repertoire included most of the classical and neoclassical roles of the ballet tradition such as Giselle, Swan Lake, The Sleeping Beauty, The Nutcracker, Raymonda, Mikhail Fokine's Les Sylphides and Petrushka, Léonide Massine's Pulcinella.

He also performed lead parts in ballets by George Balanchine (The Four Temperaments, La Chatte, The Ball), Jiri Kylian (Sinfonietta), William Forsythe (Steptext, Approximate Sonata), Uwe Scholz (Bach-Kreationen), Ohad Naharin (Axioma 7), Robert North (Troy Game), Amedeo Amodio (Afternoon of a Faune), Marie-Claude Pietragalla (Sakountala, Ni Dieu ni Maitre).

At the Rome Opera House, numerous contemporary new works (by Luciano Cannito, Paul Chalmer, Millicent Hodson, Luca Veggetti and others) have been made on him.

Mauro Bigonzetti created Comoedia-Inferno and the solo Wakti especially for him.

== Accomplishments ==
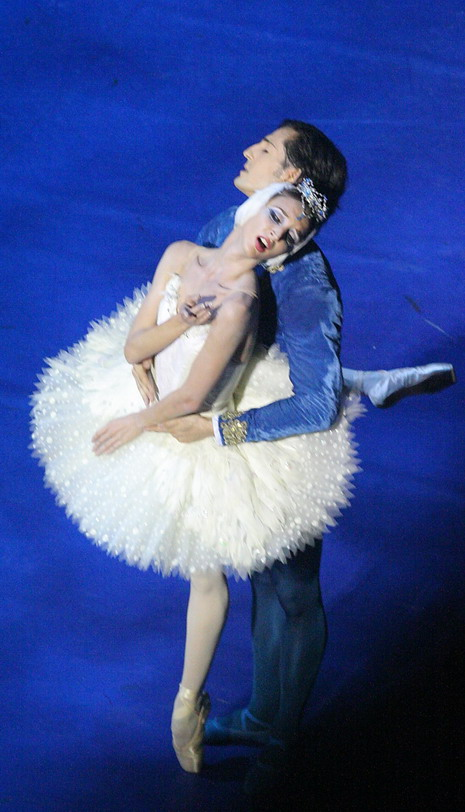
As Prince Siegfried in Swan Lake, with Ballet Nacional de Cuba's Sadaise Arencibia as Odette

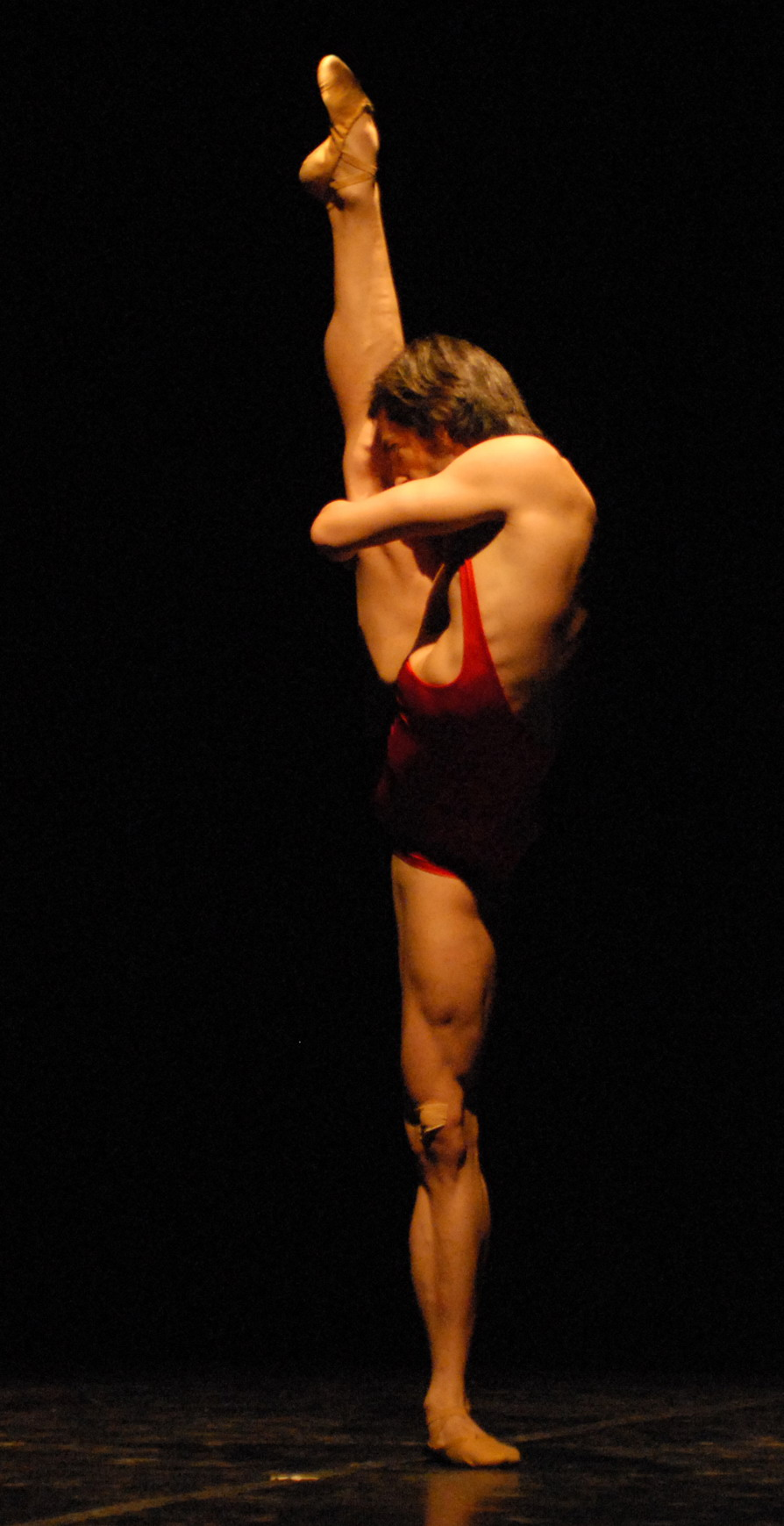
Grossi awarded as Best Dancer of the Year in Italy (2007)

He won the Léonide Massine Ballet Award in 1997 and in 2007, and the Anita Bucchi Dance Award as the Best Male Dancer of the Year (season 2006/07) with the following motivation:

"Young artist with unequalled personality and charism. His performances are the out-come of a very hard work of research, synthesis and introspection, completed by a vigorous and mature technique."

Grossi has been described as "a major star in the making", as one of the most talented Italian dancers of the moment and as one of the best dancers that Rome Opera Ballet has had.

In 2014 the Accademia Nazionale di Danza honoured him with an evening at the Teatro Ruskaja.

== Teaching career ==
From 2008 to 2016 Grossi taught ballet, working at the Arena di Verona as a ballet master and at the National Academy of Dance in Rome as guest teacher, choreographer and Pas de Deux instructor.

On 23 June 2014 he came back on stage after a six years-long absence as a "distinguished and amusing" Doctor Coppelius in the Rome Academy's traditional production of Coppélia, and he got rave responses from the audience.

Since 2016 he is not involved in the ballet world anymore.
