= Attilia Radice =

Italian ballerina (1914–1980)

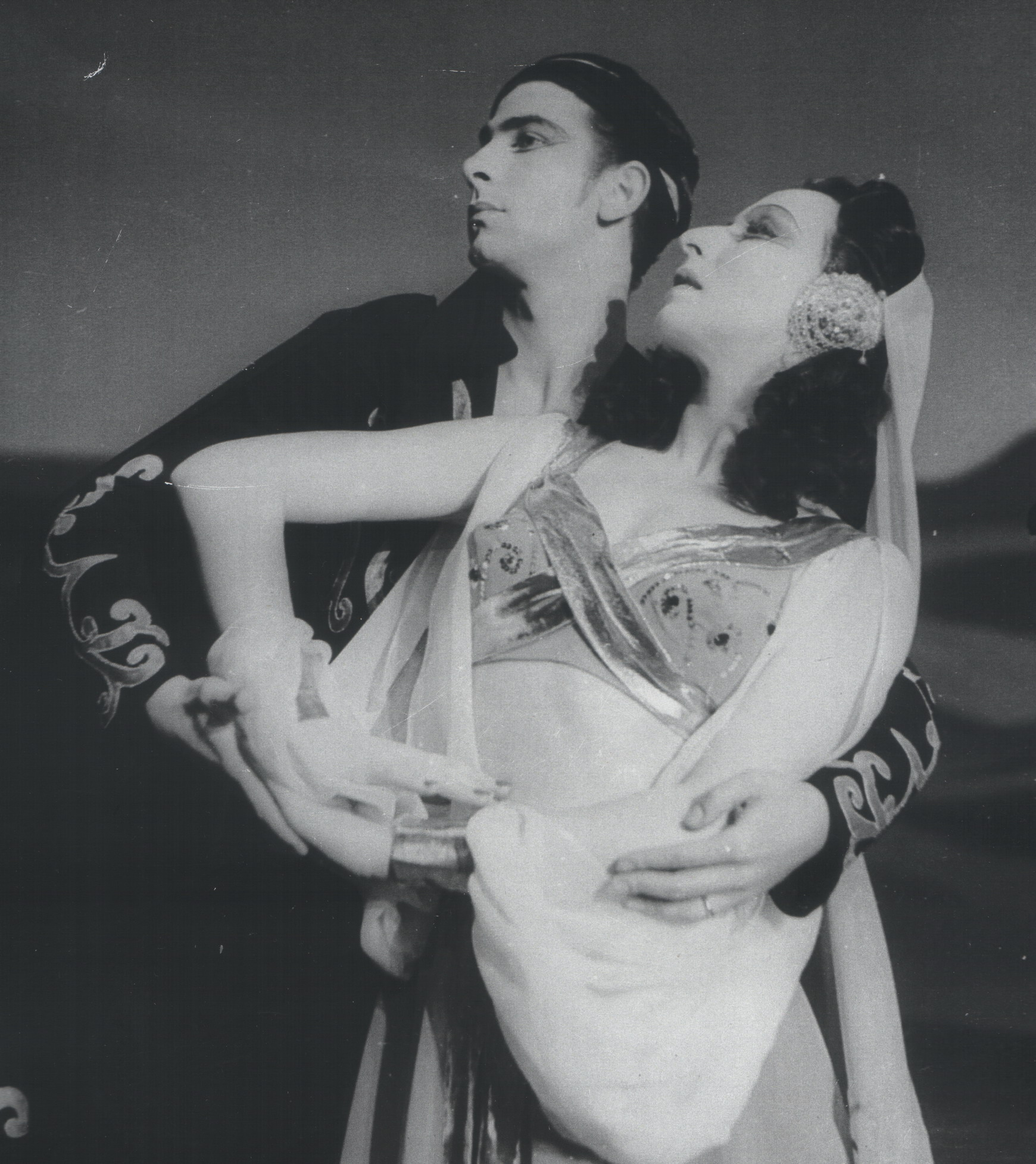
- Attilia Radice dancing with Guido Lauri (1950s)
- Born: 1914; Milan, Italy
- Died: September 14, 1980 (aged 65–66); Capranica, Italy
- Occupation: Ballerina
- Years active: 1932–1957
- Known for: Prima ballerina assoluta at the Rome Opera Ballet

Attilia Radice (1914 – September 14, 1980) was an Italian ballerina at La Scala in Milan. She is remembered above all for the roles she created at the Rome Opera.

== Biography ==
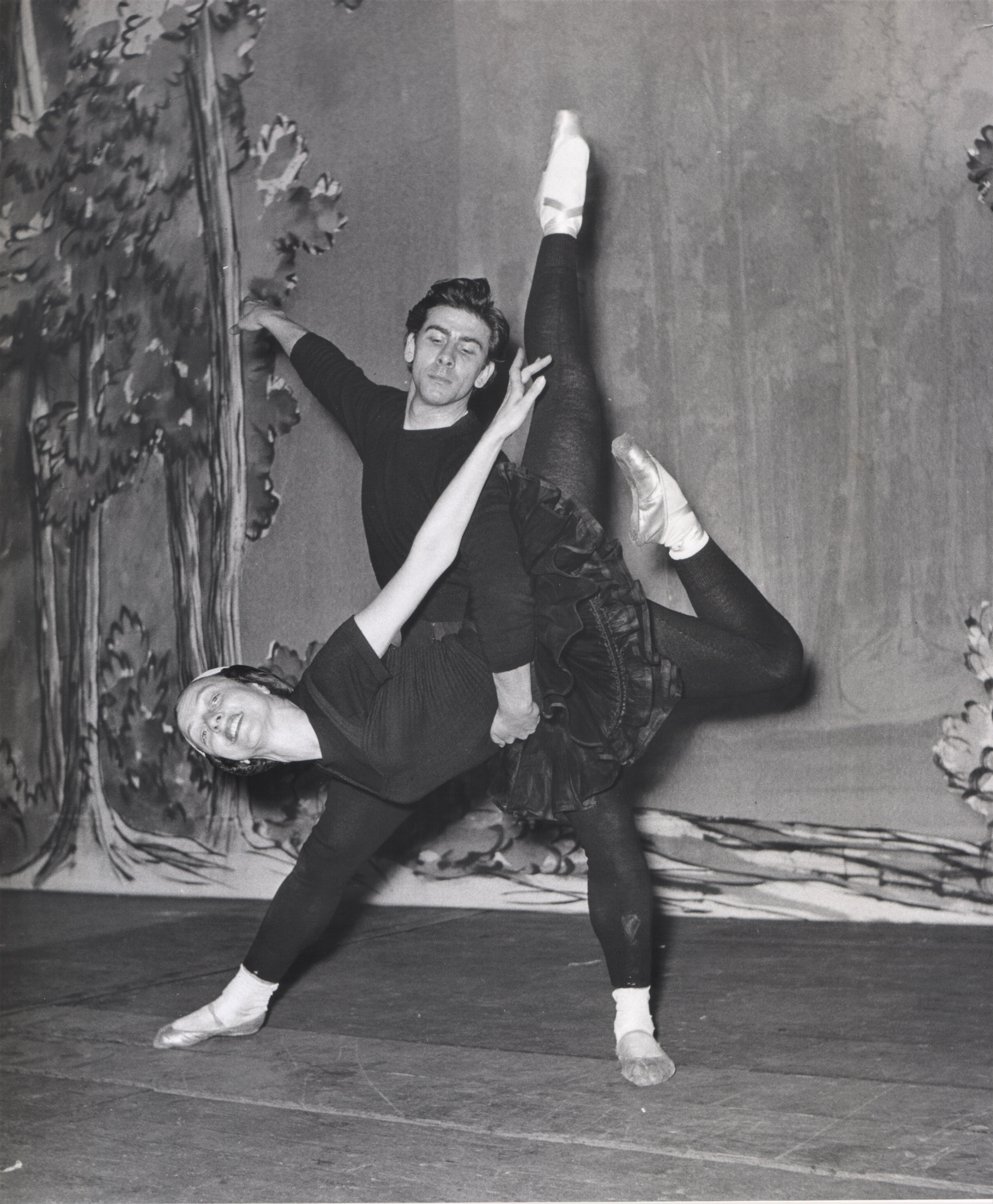
Rehearsing The Sleeping Beauty with Guido Lauri at the Rome Opera in the 1950s

Radice studied ballet at the La Scala Theatre Ballet School under Enrico Cecchetti until he died in 1928, whereafter she continued under Lucia Fornaroli graduating in 1932. She joined the La Scala company the same year, making her début in Léonide Massine's Belkis. She danced in the ballets of the 1930s including Franco Vittadini's Vecchia Milano and Riccardo Pick-Mangiagalli's Il carillon magico. Thanks to her elegant, expressive style, she soon became the Scala's prima ballerina.

From 1935 to 1957, she danced in the Rome Opera Ballet as prima ballerina assoluta with principal dancer Guido Lauri as her partner. Radice created roles in works choreographed by Aurel Milloss including Bolero and The Miraculous Mandarin. After retiring from the company in 1957, she became director of the ballet school until 1975, where she was effective in adopting Cecchetti's approach.

Attilia Radice died in Capranica on 14 September 1980.

== Major roles ==
Radice is remembered for her roles in the following ballets choreographed by Aurel Milloss:

- 1939: Petrushka
- 1940: The Creatures of Prometheus
- 1940: The Rite of Spring
- 1941: The Prodigal Son
- 1942: The Miraculous Mandarin
- 1943: Bolero
- 1947: Orpheus
- 1956: Estro arguto
