= Guido Lauri =

Italian dancer (1922–2019)

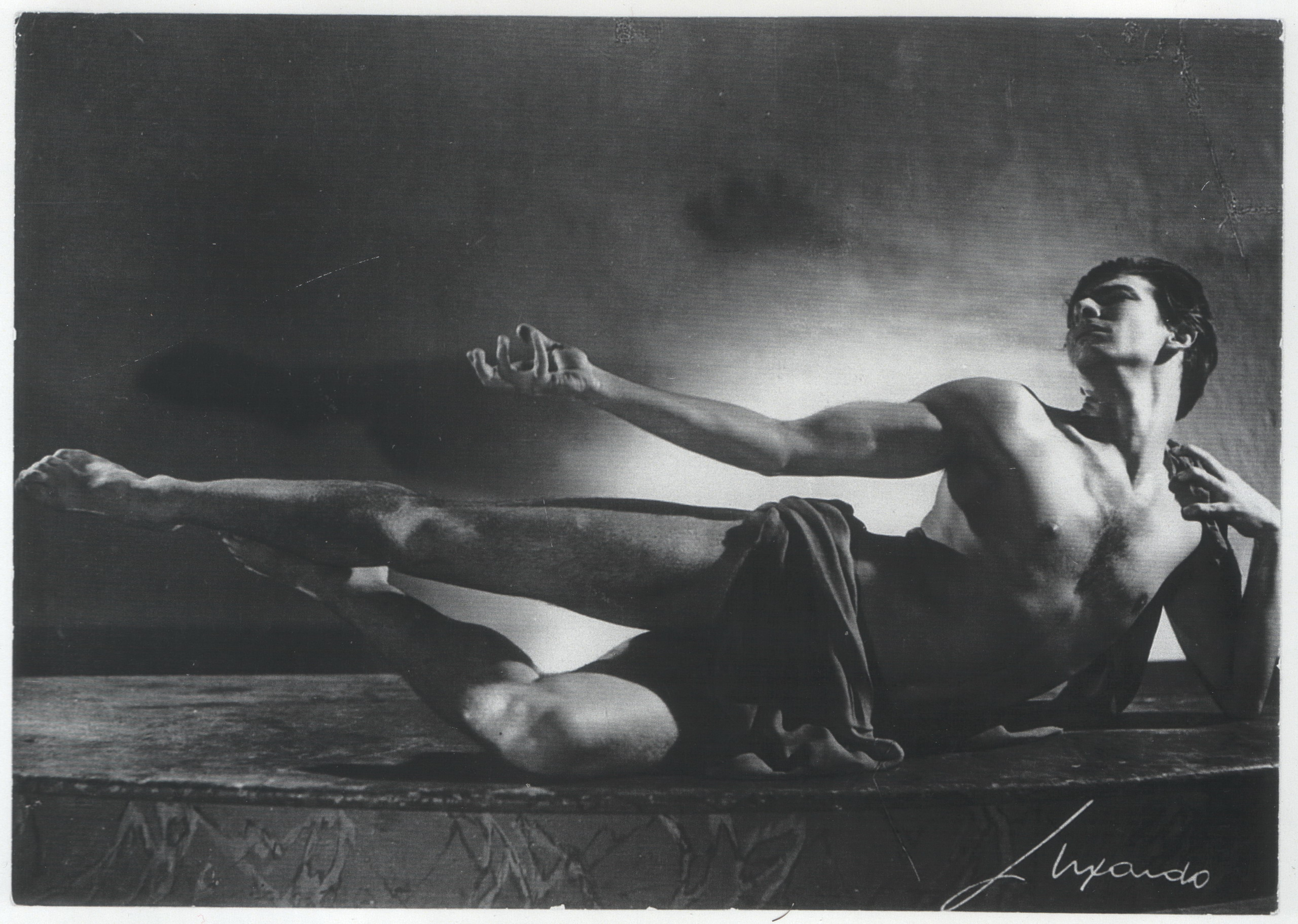
- Dance star Guido Lauri by Luxardo
- Born: 23 November 1922; Rome, Italy
- Died: 27 October 2019 (aged 96); Rome, Italy
- Occupations: Ballet dancer, ballet master, choreographer and company director
- Years active: 1928–1990
- Spouse: Anna Maria Paganini
- Children: Tiziana Lauri
- Awards: Honoris causa doctorate

Guido Lauri (23 November 1922 – 27 October 2019) was an Italian dancer, actor, choreographer, ballet master, company director.

Born in Rome, he entered the ballet school of then Royal Rome Opera House at 6 years-old and in 1939, after a graduation with full marks, he joined the ballet company with the title of primo ballerino étoile.

He partnered ballerinas including Yvette Chauviré, Marina Svetlova, Liane Daydée and Jacqueline Moreau, French/Russian Ludmilla Tchérina, Norwegian Vera Zorina and Italian Attilia Radice, and danced in neoclassical titles by Mikhail Fokin, Vaslav Nijinsky, Léonide Massine and created numerous roles for choreographer Aurel Milloss.

As a guest star, soon after the Second World War and during the 50s, he was very much in demand in Italy (La Scala in Milan, Teatro Regio in Turin, La Fenice in Venice, Teatro Comunale in Bologna, Maggio Musicale Fiorentino, Teatro di San Carlo in Naples, Teatro Massimo in Palermo) and abroad (Metropolitan Opera House in New York and Teatro Colon in Buenos Aires as well as in Germany, Austria, Switzerland, Portugal and Spain).

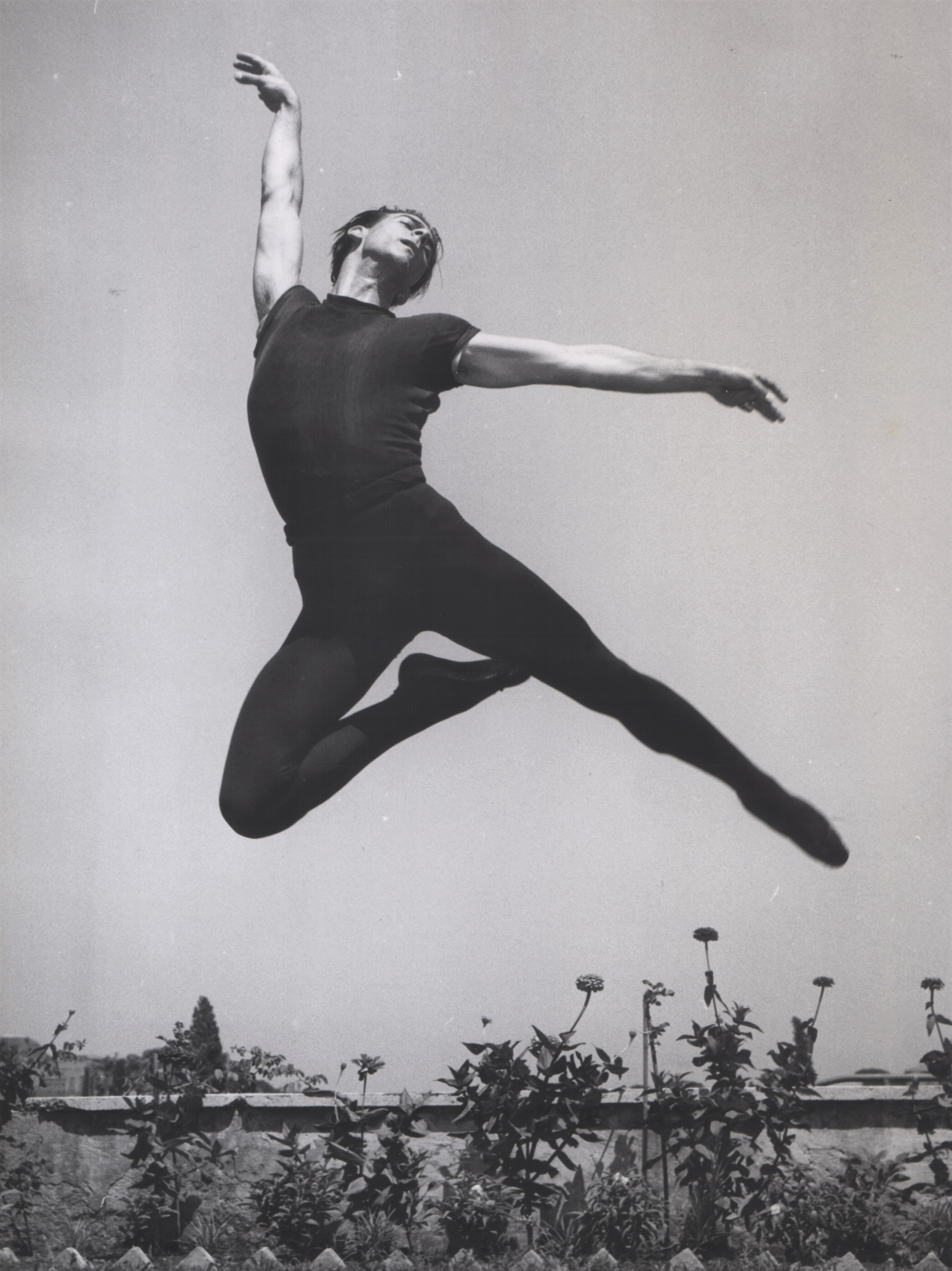
Lauri dancing in the 50s.

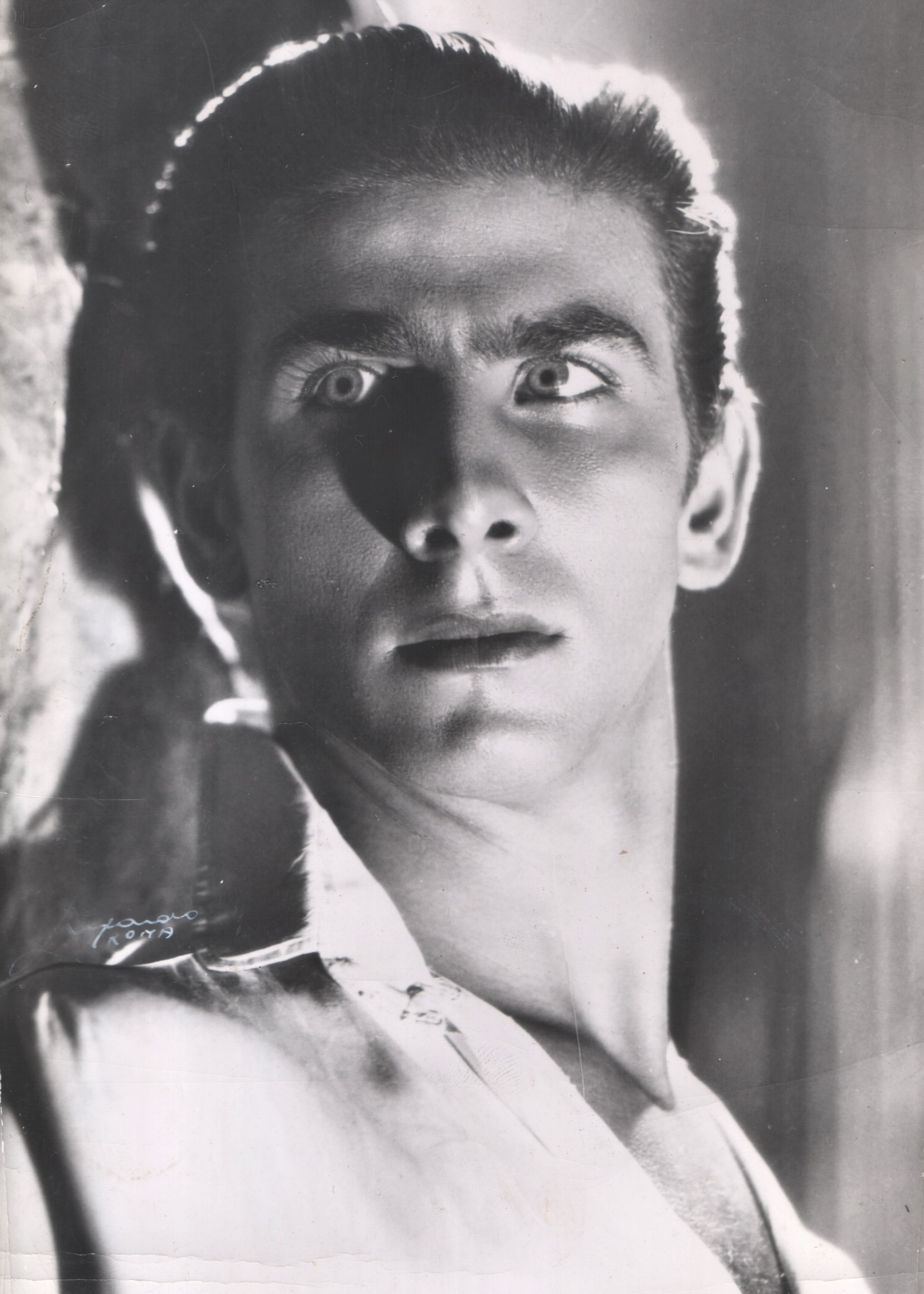
Lauri, Hollywood (mid-50s).

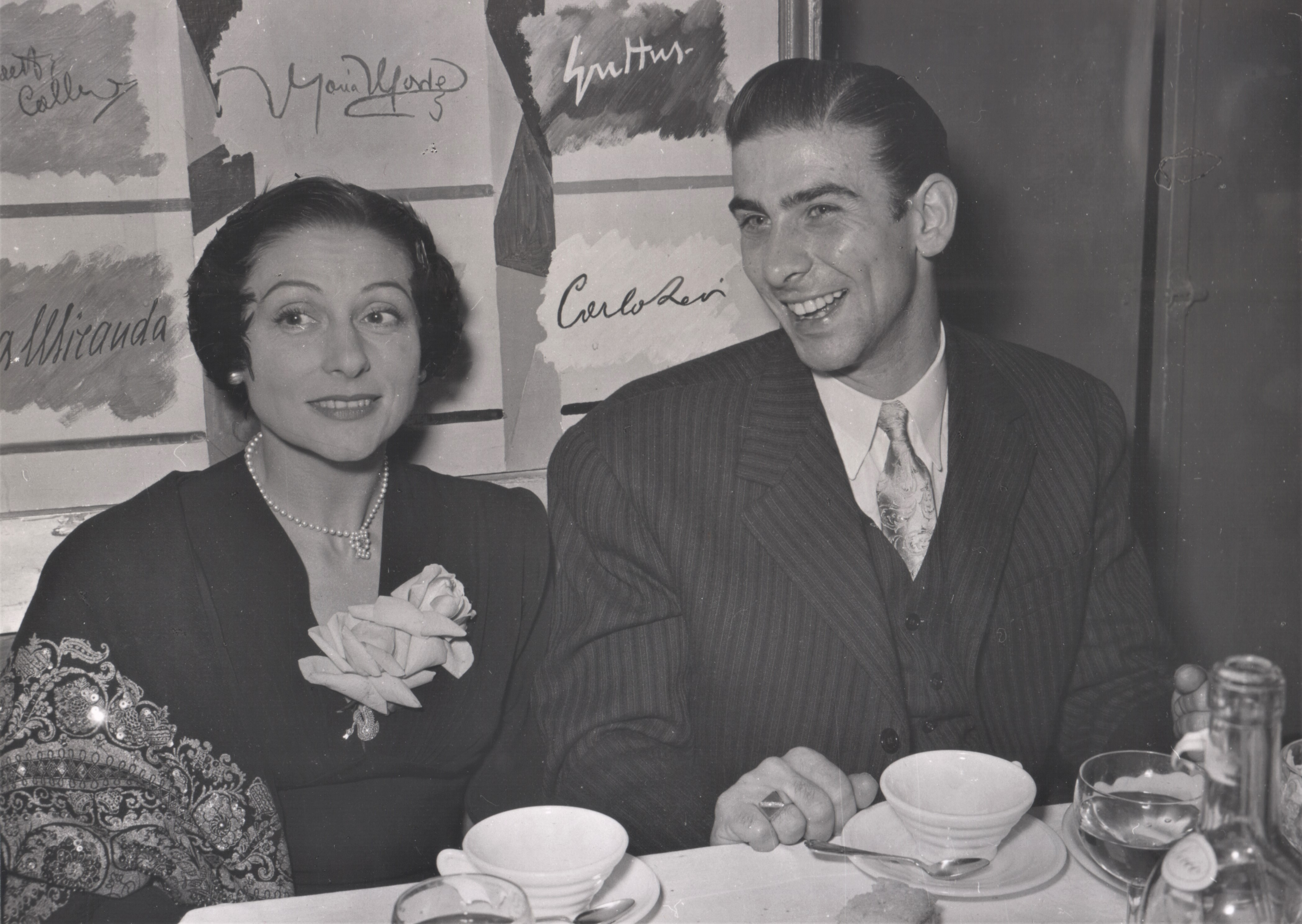
With French étoile Yvette Chauviré in Rome in the mid-50s.

As a ballet master and choreographer, he directed the Rome Opera Ballet between 1965 and 1983 collaborating with Anton Dolin (ballet dancer), Rudolf Nureyev, Roland Petit, Ninette De Valois, Patricia Neary, Pierre Lacotte; as a member of jury, he was invited by close friend Yuri Grigorovich in world-class dance competitions like those of Varna, Tokyo and Osaka.

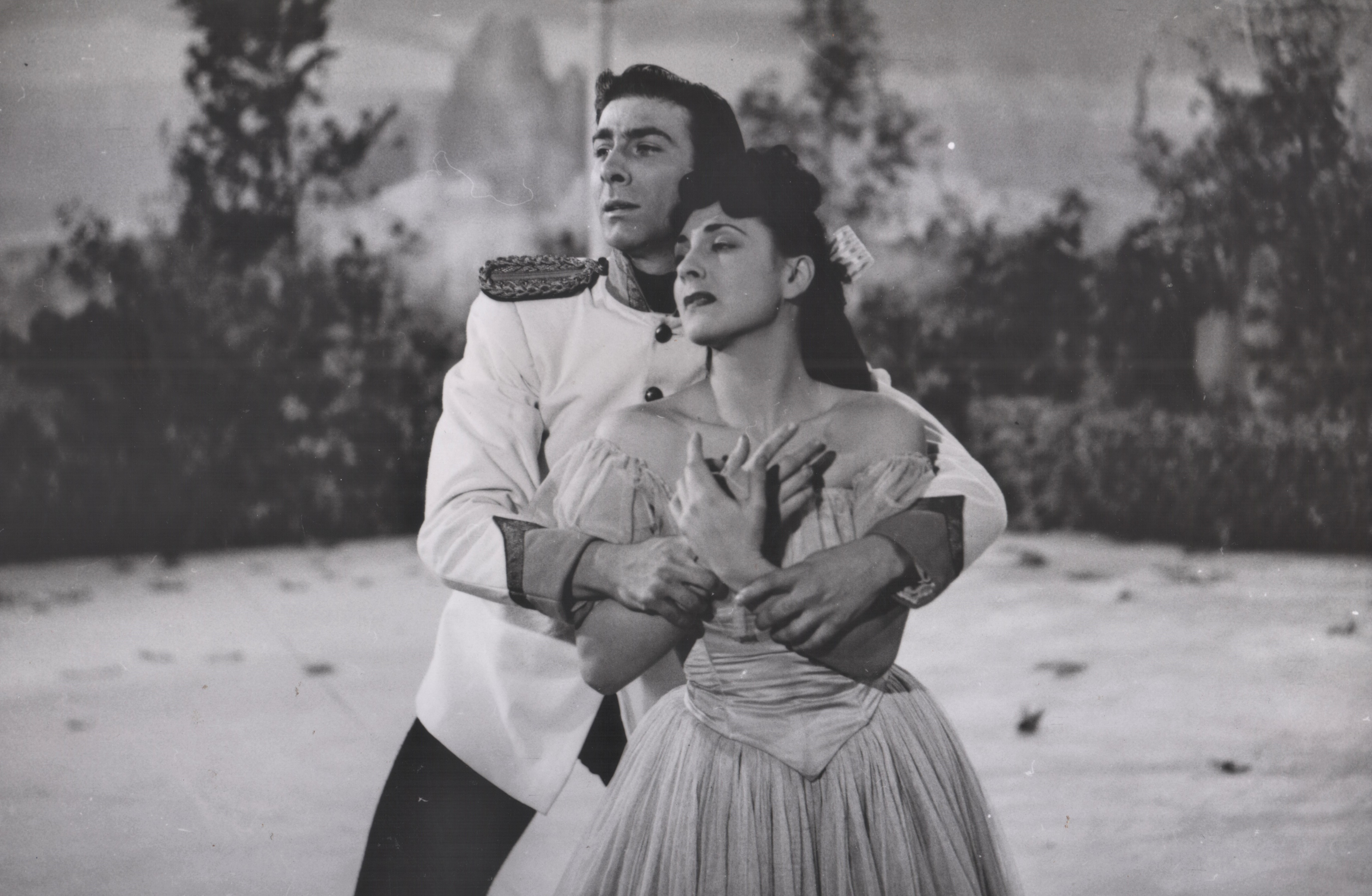
With his wife Anna Maria Paganini on the set of a European movie in the 50s.

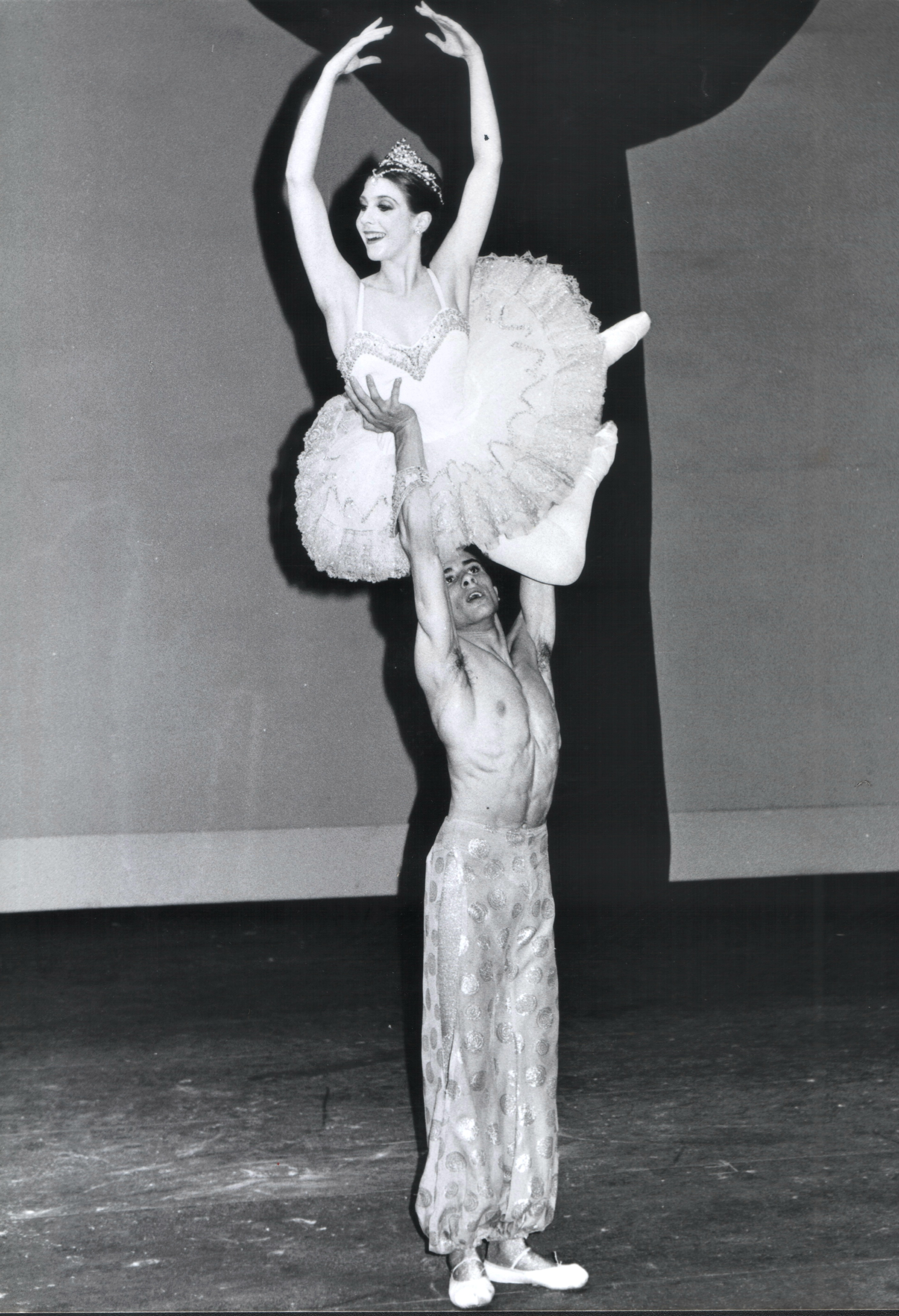
Lauri's daughter Tiziana with Lauri's nephew-in-law Raffaele Paganini in La Bayadère pas de deux at the Rome Opera in 1977.

He worked for theatre with Luchino Visconti, for television with Vittorio Gassman, for cinema with Bernardo Bertolucci and he was invited in Hollywood by Margarete Wallmann. Some of the most talented artists of the time, such as De Chirico, Guttuso, Picasso and Prince Enrico D'Assia designed costumes and scene-painting for him.

He was awarded the Berlin's Golden Bear prize in 1941, the Rome's Tiber's twins in 1964, the Florence's Michelangelo's David in 1978.

In 1957, the Accademia Mondiale degli Artisti e Professionisti chaired by Prince Ernesto Baranger, awarded him an Honorary Degree, and in 1982, American Who's Who chose him as one of the greatest prides of the Italian ballet of the 20th century.

In 1986 he was decorated by the honour Diritti Umani e Libertà - TelEuropa international prize, as a recognition of his commitment to social progress in defense of all peoples transcending race, religion, ideology, and borders.

He was married to Anna Maria Paganini, the ballet dancer for whom Erik Bruhn created the role of the Spirit of the Lake in his 1965 version of Swan Lake act2: they had a daughter, Tiziana Lauri, an acclaimed ballerina herself. He also counted among his relatives a large number of dancers, athlete Eliseo Paganini and celebrated operatic bass Giulio Neri.

== Sources ==
- Premio Guido Lauri per la danza, Morfoedro
- Enciclopedia dello Spettacolo, founded by Silvio D'Amico – Le Maschere, Roma (p. 1281).
- Enciclopedia dello spettacolo, Garzanti (p. 366).
- Cinquant'anni del Teatro dell'Opera 1928–1978, Bestetti editore 1979.
- Teatro dell'Opera di Roma, Archivio Storico.
- Who's Who in the World, Sixth Edition 1982–83 – Marquis Who's Who, Inc. U.S.A (p. 630).
- Who's Who in Italy, 1987 (p. 710).
- Guido Lauri: "La danza per me è una preghiera, una missione... dobbiamo essere sacerdoti di questa passione!", interview Il Giornale della Danza (2 February 2011).
- Tiziana Lauri: "Noi tutti dobbiamo imparare a corporizzare lo spirito e a spiritualizzare il corpo", interview Il Giornale della Danza (23 September 2011).
- Guido Lauri, la voce di un secolo di danza, interview GB Opera Magazine(22 August 2015).
