= Titian of Oderzo =

Christian saint and bishop (7th century)

Saint Titian of Oderzo
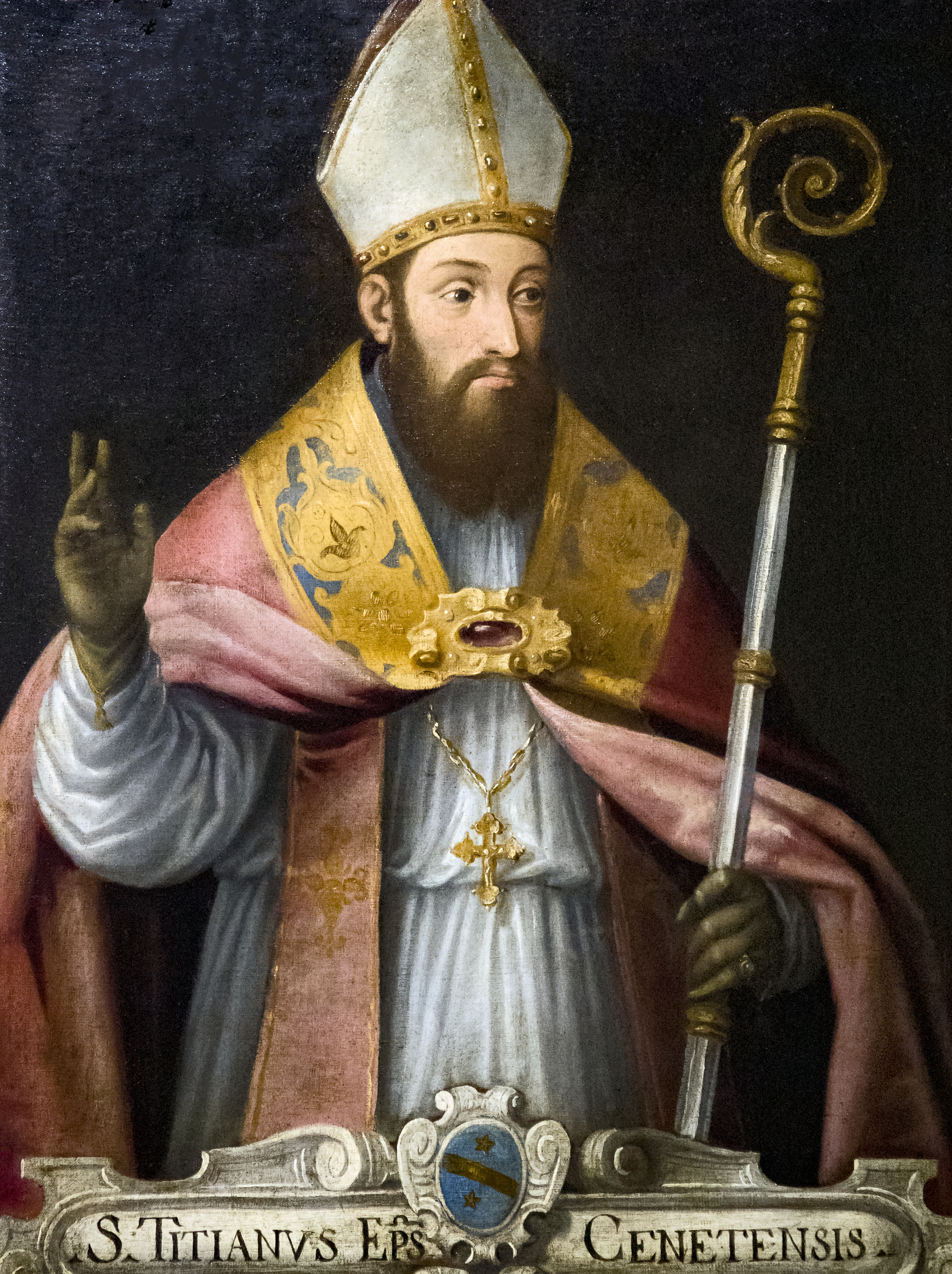
- Titian of Oderzo Madonna dell'Orto.

Bishop
- Born: Eraclea, Italy
- Died: 632 AD; Oderzo, Italy
- Venerated in: Catholic Church; Eastern Orthodox Church
- Major shrine: Ceneda
- Feast: January 16
- Attributes: episcopal attire
- Patronage: Ceneda; Oderzo

Saint Titian of Oderzo (Italian: San Tiziano di Oderzo) was a 7th-century bishop of Opitergium (Oderzo), in the Province of Treviso.

Titian was born to a noble family of Eraclea (Grisolera) in the Veneto region, and served as a deacon and priest to Florian (Florianus), bishop of Opitergium (Oderzo). Titian devoted himself to serving the poor, and when Florian stepped down from his episcopal office to work as a missionary, Titian was declared his successor. Titian devoted himself to his diocese, and was an opponent of Arianism. Titian died in 632, traditionally on January 16, and was buried in the cathedral of Oderzo.

== Veneration ==
Many miracles are said to have occurred at Titian's tomb in Oderzo, and Titian's cult spread as a result. Evidence of his cult exists from the 8th century, with documents referring to his cult dating from 743 and 794, and his name appears in Usuard's martyrology of 875. His name appears in the Roman Martyrology of 1584.

His relics are now in the crypt of the cathedral of Ceneda, in a bronze urn fashioned in neo-Byzantine style in the form of a sarcophagus. He is depicted in various paintings in the cathedrals of Oderzo and Ceneda, and there are ten parishes dedicated in his name.

The translation of Titian's relics from Oderzo to Ceneda occurred in 665 AD, when Oderzo was destroyed by the Lombards under Grimoald I of Benevento. A tradition states that Titian's relics were moved from Oderzo when inhabitants of the saint's native Eraclea attempted to steal the relics. After a fierce battle between the inhabitants of Oderzo and Eraclea, it was decided that Titian's relics should be placed in a wagon pulled by oxen. Wherever the oxen stopped would be where the relics would be housed. The oxen stopped at Ceneda, and this is where the relics have remained to this day.

An ancestor of the famous painter Titian had received a chapel dedicated to St. Titian of Oderzo as part of the dowry of the lady he married, and therefore the name Titian or Tiziano became common in the painter's family.
