= Titian of Brescia =

Saint Titian of Brescia

Bishop
- Died: fifth century
- Venerated in: Roman Catholic Church
- Major shrine: Church of Saints Cosmas and Damian, Brescia
- Feast: April 20; March 3

Saint Titian of Brescia (Italian: San Tiziano di Brescia) was a fifth-century bishop of Brescia. In the list of bishops of Brescia, he is considered the fifteenth bishop of Brescia, succeeding Vigilius and preceding Paul II. His episcopate is believed to have occurred at the end of the fifth century.

== Veneration ==
He was buried in the Church of Saints Cosmas and Damian (ss. Cosma e Damiano), but this church was demolished in May 1302 by Bishop Berard in order to build the Palazzo Broletto on the Piazza del Duomo. A newer Church of Saints Cosmas and Damian was rebuilt in the western part of the city, in the area known as Campi Bassi, and Titian's relics were translated to this new church by Bishop Paolo Zane in 1505 in a marble sarcophagus built on top of the altar of the left chapel. Since 1962, he has shared a liturgical feast on April 20 with other Brescian saints.
