= Plisetsky =

Plisetsky, Plisetskaya (Russian: Плисецкий, Плисе́цкая) - surname.

- Michael Plisetsky was Consul General of the USSR at the island of Spitsbergen, father of the Maya Plisetskaya, Aleksander Plisetsky.
- Maya Plisetskaya was a Russian ballet dancer, choreographer, ballet director.
- Aleksander Plisetsky was a Russian ballet dancer, ballet master, ballet director, brother of the Maya Plisetskaya.
- Anna Plisetskaya is a Russian ballerina, actress and producer, daughter of the Aleksander Plisetsky.
- German Plisetsky was a notable Russian poet and translator.
- Yuri Plisetsky is a figure skating prodigy from the Japanese anime series Yuri!!! on Ice.

== See also ==
- Plesetsk
- Plesetsk Cosmodrome
- 4626 Plisetskaya is a main-belt asteroid discovered on December 23, 1984 by L. G. Karachkina at Nauchnyj.
