= Messerer =

Messerer is a surname. Notable people with the surname include:

- Azary Messerer, birth name of Azary Azarin (1897—1937), Soviet actor
- Asaf Messerer (1903–1992), Lithuanian-born Soviet ballet dancer
- Boris Messerer, Soviet and Russian theater artist, set designer and teacher
- Christoph Messerer (born 2001), Austrian footballer
- Henri Messerer (1838–1923), French organist and music composer
- Rachel Messerer (1902–1993), Russian actress
- Sulamith Messerer (1908–2004), Russian ballerina
