= Anel Sudakevich =

Soviet actress

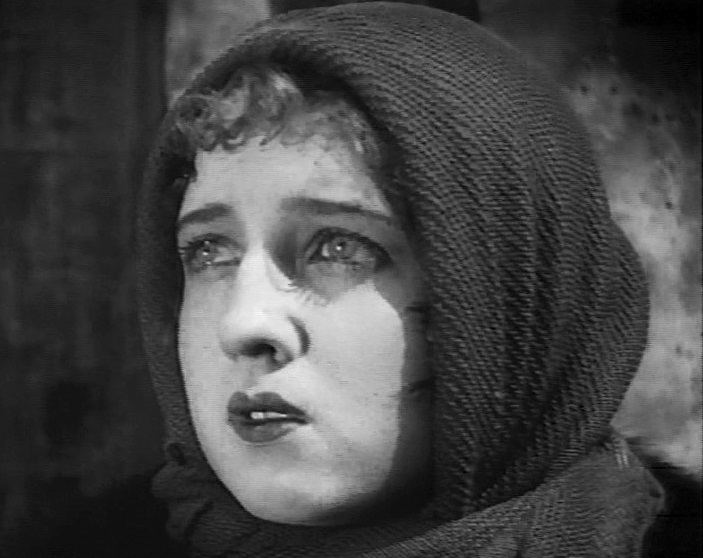
- Soviet silent film actress
- Born: Anna Alekseyevna Sudakevich; December 27, 1906; Moscow, Russian Empire
- Died: September 22, 2002 (aged 95); Moscow, Russia
- Occupation: Actress
- Years active: 1926–1929
- Spouse: Asaf Messerer
- Children: Boris Messerer
- Relatives: Rachel Messerer (sister-in-law); Sulamith Messerer (sister-in-law)

Anel Sudakevich (born Anna Alekseyevna Sudakevich; Russian: Анель Судакевич; December 27, 1906 – September 22, 2002) was a Soviet silent film actress.

Anna was born in a Belarusian-Polish family. She was married to Soviet ballet dancer Asaf Messerer. They had one son, Boris Messerer (Russian: Борис Мессерер). As soon as her son was born, Anna gave up her film career and became a costume designer in the theatre. Her further appearances in the cinema ("Ivan the Terrible" II (1945), "Malenkiye tragedii" (1979) and "Agoniya" (1981) were just small parts.

== Filmography ==
- Miss Mend (1926)
- Pobeda zhenschiny (1927) as Marfinka
- A Kiss From Mary Pickford (1927) as Dusya
- Kto ty takoy? (1927)
- The House on Trubnaya (1928) as Marisha - maid
- The Yellow Ticket (1928) as Anya - Baron's married daughter
- Storm Over Asia (1928) as Commandant's blonde daughter
- Dva-Buldi-dva (1929)
- Agony (film) (1981)

== See also ==
- Vera Kholodnaya
- Igor Ilyinsky
- Vera Karalli
