= Mikhail Plisetski =

Soviet diplomat

- Born: Mikhail Emmanuilovich (Mendelevich) Plisetski; 1899; Gomel, Russian Empire (now Belarus)
- Died: 1938 (aged 38–39); Moscow, Russian SFSR, Soviet Union (now Russia)
- Occupation: Diplomat
- Spouse: Rachel Messerer
- Children: Maya Plisetskaya; Alexander Plisetski; Azari Plisetski
- Relatives: Asaf Messerer (brother-in-law); Sulamith Messerer (sister-in-law); Anna Plisetskaya (granddaughter)

Mikhail Emmanuilovich (Mendelevich) Plisetski (Russian: Михаил Эммануилович (Менделевич) Плисецкий; 1899 — 1938) was a Soviet diplomat.

== Biography ==
Mikhail Plisetski was born in Gomel to the Lithuanian Jewish family of Mendel Plisetski (1869–30 June 1930) and his wife Sima (née Markovskaya; 1868–1939).

In 1918, Plisetski was in the army and participated in the Russian Civil War. He joined the Communist Party the following year. After the civil war, Plisetski studied at the Economic Institute and worked in the Commissariats of Foreign Affairs and Foreign Trade.

In 1932–1936, he headed the Soviet coal mines at Barentsburg on the Norwegian island of Spitsbergen where he managed the coal concessions (trust "Arctic-carbon"). He also served as the Consul General of the USSR to the island.

He was purged and arrested on 30 April 1937, charged with espionage, and executed on 8 January 1938. Plisetski was rehabilitated by the Soviet authorities on 3 March 1956.

According to his daughter Maya, the arrest was triggered by Plisetski's meeting in 1934 with his elder brother Lester Plesent, who had been living in the USA since 1912. Other sources suggest that his arrest may have been related to his hiring Richard Pikel, the former secretary of prominent Old Bolshevik Grigory Zinoviev, who both were also purged and executed.

== Family ==
Mikhail Plisetski was married to Russian silent film actress Rachel Messerer. They had three children: daughter Maya Plisetskaya (1925–2015), the famous ballerina; and sons Alexander Plisetski (1931–1985), a well-known balletmaster, and Azari Plisetski (b. 1937), a teacher and choreographer.

Mikhail had two brothers: Israel Plisetski (after moving to USA in 1912 — Lester Plesent) and Vladimir Plesent, an alumnus of The Moscow Institute of Cinematography, actor, stuntman. Vladimir served in special Air Forces during World War II and was killed in action. Mikhail also had two sisters: Elizabeth (married name Ezerskaya) and Maria (married name Levitskaya).
