= Anna Plisetskaya =

Russian ballerina, actress and producer (born 1971)

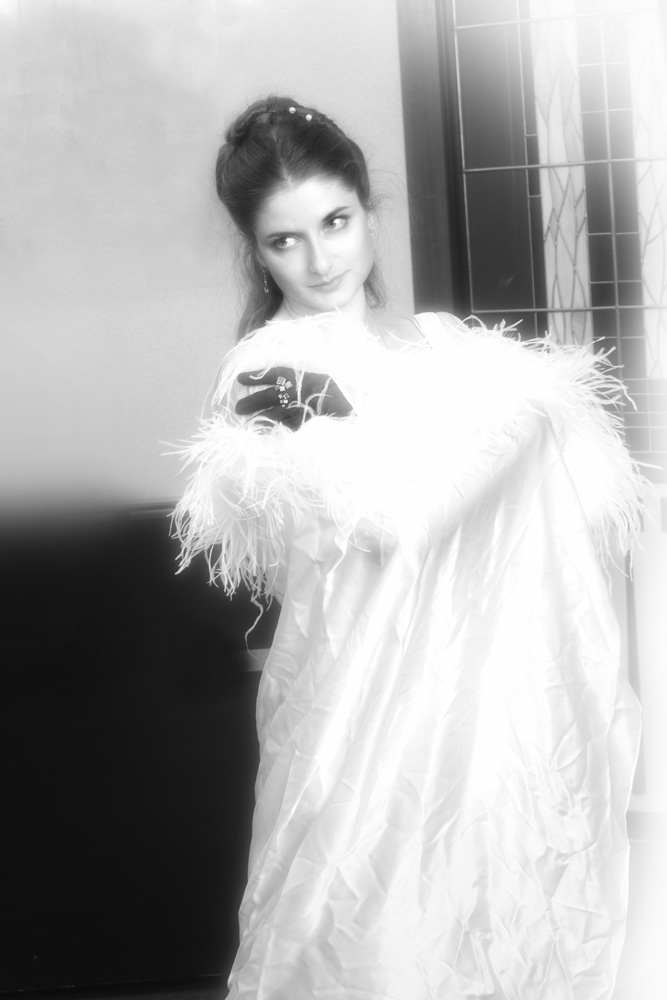
- Born: August 18, 1971 (age 54); Moscow, Soviet Union
- Occupations: ballerina, actress, producer
- Parent(s): Alexander Plisetski; Marianna Sedova
- Relatives: Maya Plisetskaya (aunt); Azari Plisetski (uncle); Rachel Messerer (grandmother); Asaf Messerer (great-uncle); Sulamith Messerer (great-aunt); Boris Messerer (first cousin once removed)

Anna Alexandrovna Plisetskaya (Russian: Анна Александровна Плисецкая, born August 18, 1971) is a Russian ballerina, actress and producer.

== Family ==
Anna Plisetskaya belongs to the Messerer-Plisetski artistic family. She was born to Alexander Plisetski, a ballet master and Marianna Sedova, a ballerina at the Bolshoi Theatre. Her aunt was the well-known ballet dancer Maya Plisetskaya. Her uncle was the principal dancer Azari Plisetski. Her paternal grandmother was silent film actress Rachel Messerer (the sister of ballet dancer and teacher Asaf Messerer and of ballerina Sulamith Messerer). Boris Messerer, a theater artist, is her father's first cousin.

== Biography ==
Anna was born in Moscow on August 18, 1971.

She spent her childhood in South America. During 1974–76 her family lived in Lima (Peru), where her father had founded the Ballet at National University of San Marcos. The family spent the next two years in Buenos Aires (Argentina) where her father worked for Teatro Colón (1976–78).

Anna Plisetskaya studied at Vaganova Academy of Russian Ballet in Saint Petersburg during 1981–1989. Upon graduation from the academy, Anna was invited to Mariinsky Theatre where she became a soloist dancer. From 1989 to 1995, she danced at a number of a world-famous ballets: "Don Quixote", "La Sylphide", "Coppélia", "Polovetsian Dances" from the opera "Prince Igor", "The Fountain of Bakhchisarai", and Mirta at «Giselle».

In 1993–95 Anna was a soloist of the Béjart Ballet troupe directed by Maurice Béjart.

Anna Plisetskaya had her own Solo Ballet Program from 1995 to 2006.

== Filmography ==
- 1983 – Mary Poppins, Goodbye as Jane Banks. Director – Leonid Kvinikhidze.
- 1992 – Film-ballet The Last Tarantella, as Nina. Director – Alexander Belinski
- 2006–08 – Theatre adaptation of the play "Anna Karenina", as Betsy, the Princess Elizaveta. Director – Andrew Zhitinkin.

During 2007–10 Anna Plisetskaya was a guest at numerous TV shows. Documentary films about Anna were broadcast on Russian local TV channels STS, NTV, REN-TV, TV Center, Russia K and other.

== Performances and programs ==
- 2003 – Author and producer of "The whole world" show and "Renaissance Generation" (2000) in Concert Hall «Rossia».
- 2007 – Performance director "The City by Jazz eyes" with Daniel Kramer.

== Music ==
- Single «Blue Moon» (2008)
- Betsi Jane «Dinner with Jazz» (2009)

== See also ==
- List of Russian ballet dancers
