= ALZhIR =

Gulag labor camp

Coordinates: 51.078220°N 70.971676°E

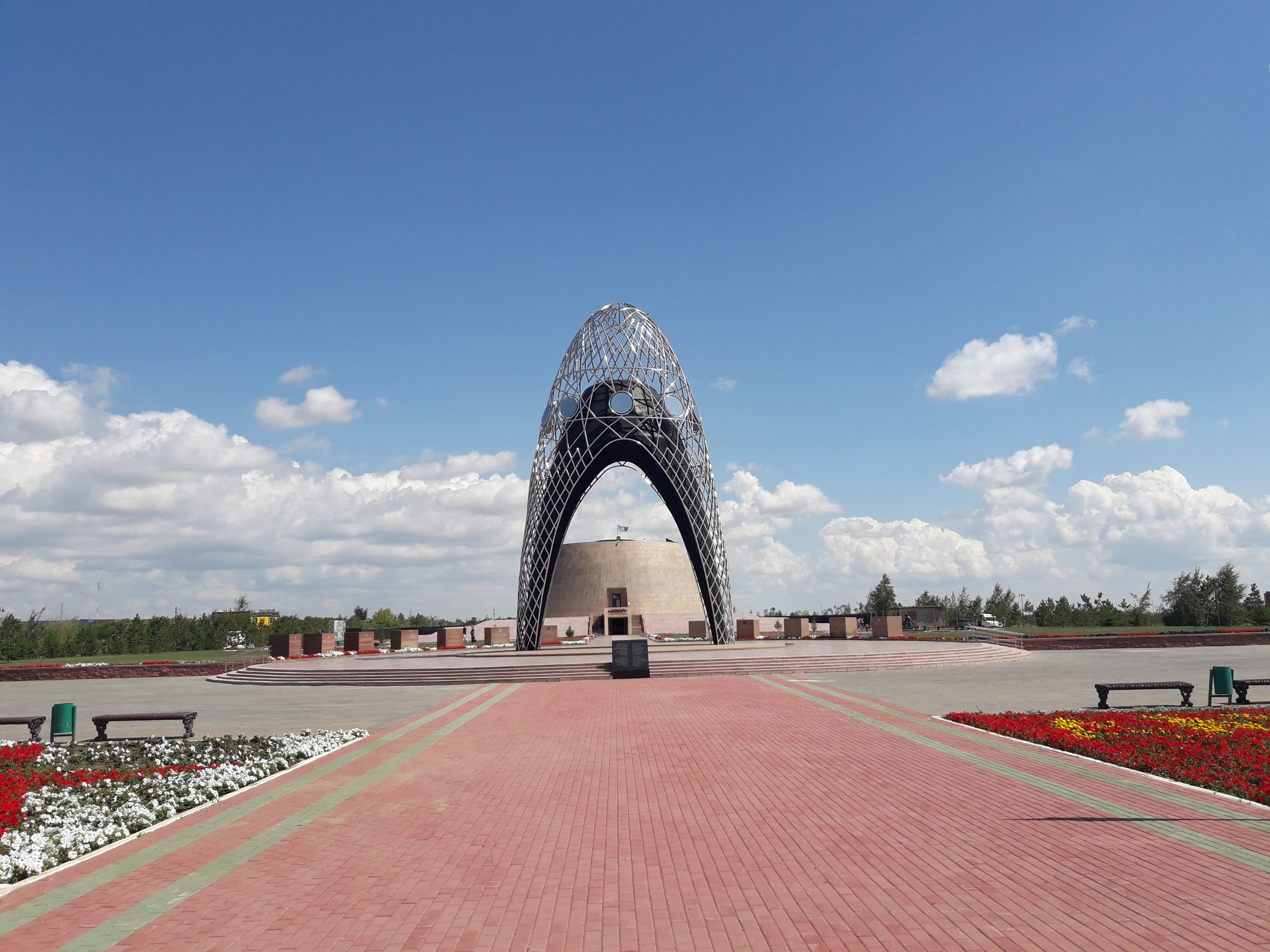
Memorial on the site of the ALZhIR

ALZhIR, the Akmolinsk Camp of Wives of Traitors to the Motherland (Russian: Акмолинский лагерь жён изменников Родины, АЛЖИР, romanized: Akmolinskiy lager' zhon izmennikov Rodiny, ALZhIR), was a colloquial name for the 17th special female camp detachment of the Karlag, Karaganda labor camp of the Gulag in the Akmola Region of Kazakhstan. The name comes from the fact that the majority of the inmates were the ChSIR: members of the families of traitors to the Motherland after NKVD Order 00486 of 15 August 1937. Over 18,000 women spent some time in the camp during its existence, and about 8,000 women served a full sentence there, of which 4,500 were ChSIR. The name was an ironical joke of the inmates, because "Алжир" means "Algeria" in Russian.

It was established in August 1937 by the village of Malinovka (now Tonkeris) southwest of Akmola (now Astana). Its total area was 30,000 hectares. It was closed in the beginning of 1950

Today, the camp houses a museum-memorial complex of victims of political repression and totalitarianism, which opened on 31 May 2007 as part of an initiative of President Nursultan Nazarbayev. After the closure of the prisons in 1953, it was reported that 1,507 of the women gave birth as a result of being raped by the guards.

Several hundred of the women were ethnic Koreans, part of the Koryo-saram community of Central Asia. There is a monument to these women, with text written in Korean and Cyrillic, at the location.

== Notable inmates ==
- Sister of Marshal Tukhachevsky, wife and daughter of Avel Enukidze, wives of Saken Seifullin, Beimbet Mailin and of many other notable Kazakhs.
- Rachel Messerer, actress, wife of executed diplomat Mikhail Plisetski, mother of famous ballet dancer Maya Plisetskaya
- Shukriyya Akhundzada (1902-1993), wife of Azerbaijani poet Ahmad Javad, who penned the lyrics to the Azerbaijan National Anthem but who was executed in 1937.
