= Nikolai Yavorsky =

Russian-Cuban ballet teacher and Choreographer (1891–1947)

- Николай Яворский; Микола Яворський
- Yavorsky in 1939
- Born: Nikolai Petrovich Yavorsky; 23 February 1891; Odesa, Kherson Governorate, Russian Empire (now Ukraine)
- Died: 9 October 1947 (aged 56); Santiago de Cuba, Cuba
- Resting place: Santa Ifigenia Cemetery
- Occupations: Choreographer; Ballet teacher
- Career
- Former groups: Opéra Privée

Nikolai Petrovich Yavorsky (Russian: Николай Петрович Яворский; Ukrainian: Микола Петрович Яворський; 23 February 1891 – 9 October 1947) was an Odesan-born Russian-Cuban choreographer and ballet teacher.

== Biography ==
Nikolai Petrovich Yavorsky (Russian: Николай Петрович Яворский; Ukrainian: Микола Петрович Яворський) was born in Odesa, Kherson Governorate (present-day Ukraine). In 1909, he started studying classical dance. During World War I he was an artillery officer, during Russian Civil War he fought in the Armed Forces of South Russia. Emigre since 1920, he lived in Turkey, Greece and Yugoslavia.

In 1922 Yavorsky was invited to the newly created ballet company of the National Theatre in Belgrade, where he worked under the guidance of Elena Polyakova. In 1928 he moved to Paris where he joined the ballet troupe of the Théâtre des Champs-Élysées.

In 1929 Yavorsky joined the ballet company of the Opéra Privée created by Maria Kuznetsova-Benois that the same year left Paris for a road tour to Latin America. After the Opéra Privée dissolution in 1930 Yavorsky had to stay in Cuba for the lack of money to return to Europe.

In June 1931 Nikolai Yavorsky was invited to direct the dance school established by the Pro-Arte Musical society in Havana. He taught classical dance there till 1939, being the first ballet teacher of the further outstanding Cuban dancers and choreographers Alberto Alonso and Alicia Alonso. In 1936, when Sol Hurok brought the Ballets Russes de Monte Carlo to Havana, Yavorsky helped Alberto Alonso, one of his best pupils, to join that prestigious ballet company.

In 1939 - 1941 Yavorsky managed his own ballet studio in Vedado district of Havana. In early 1941 he was invited by the Pro-Arte Musical society of Santiago de Cuba to direct its new dance school which was going to be opened in that city.

Nikolai Yavorsky spent his last years in Oriente province of Cuba, where he headed a dance school of the Pro-Arte Musical society's branch in Oriente province.

Nikolai Yavorsky died in Santiago de Cuba. He was buried at the Santa Ifigenia Cemetery.
