= Graduation Ball =

1940 ballet in one act choreographed by David Lichine

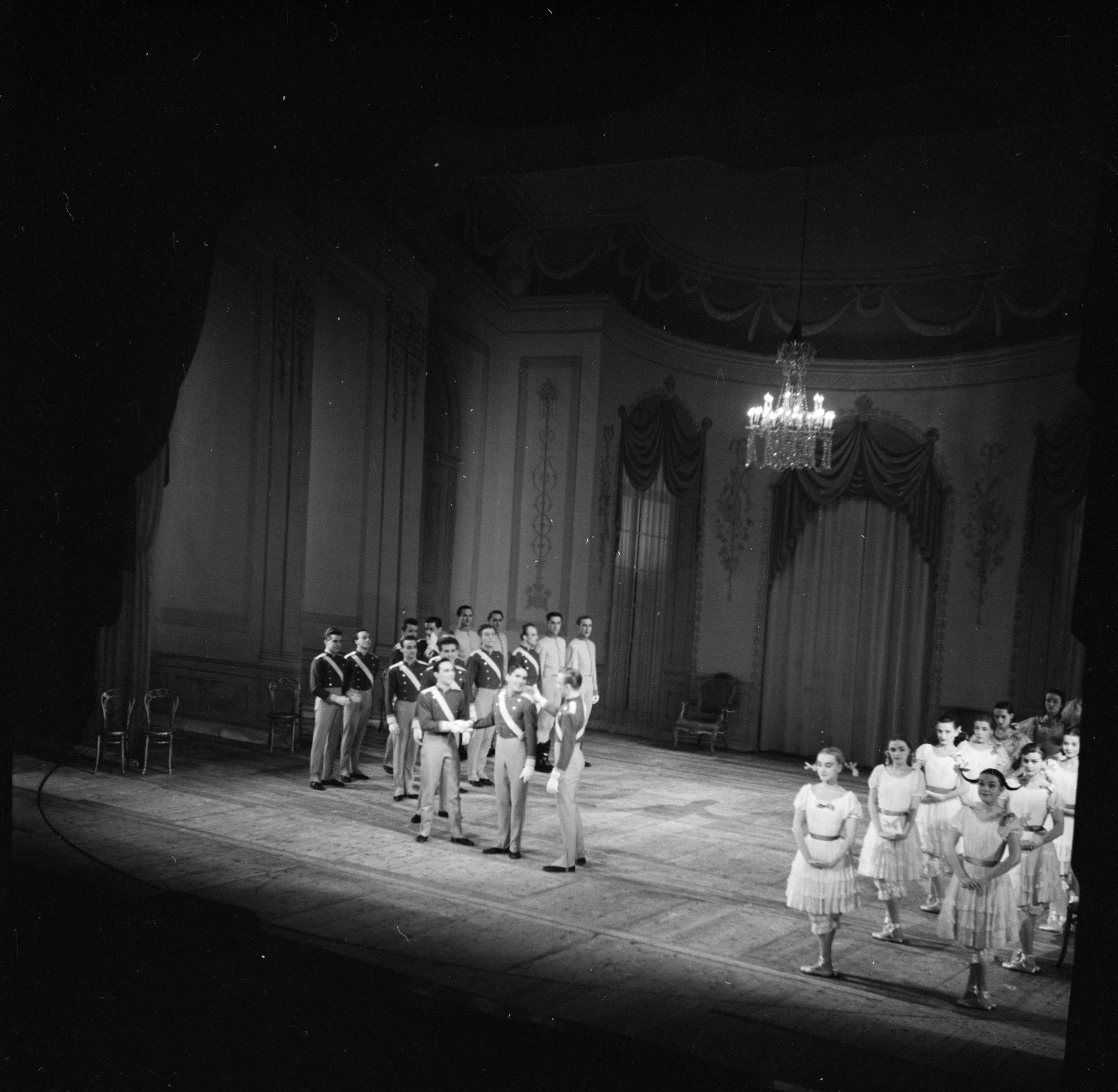
Graduation Ball performed by Royal Danish Ballet in 1954 (photo by Willem van de Poll)

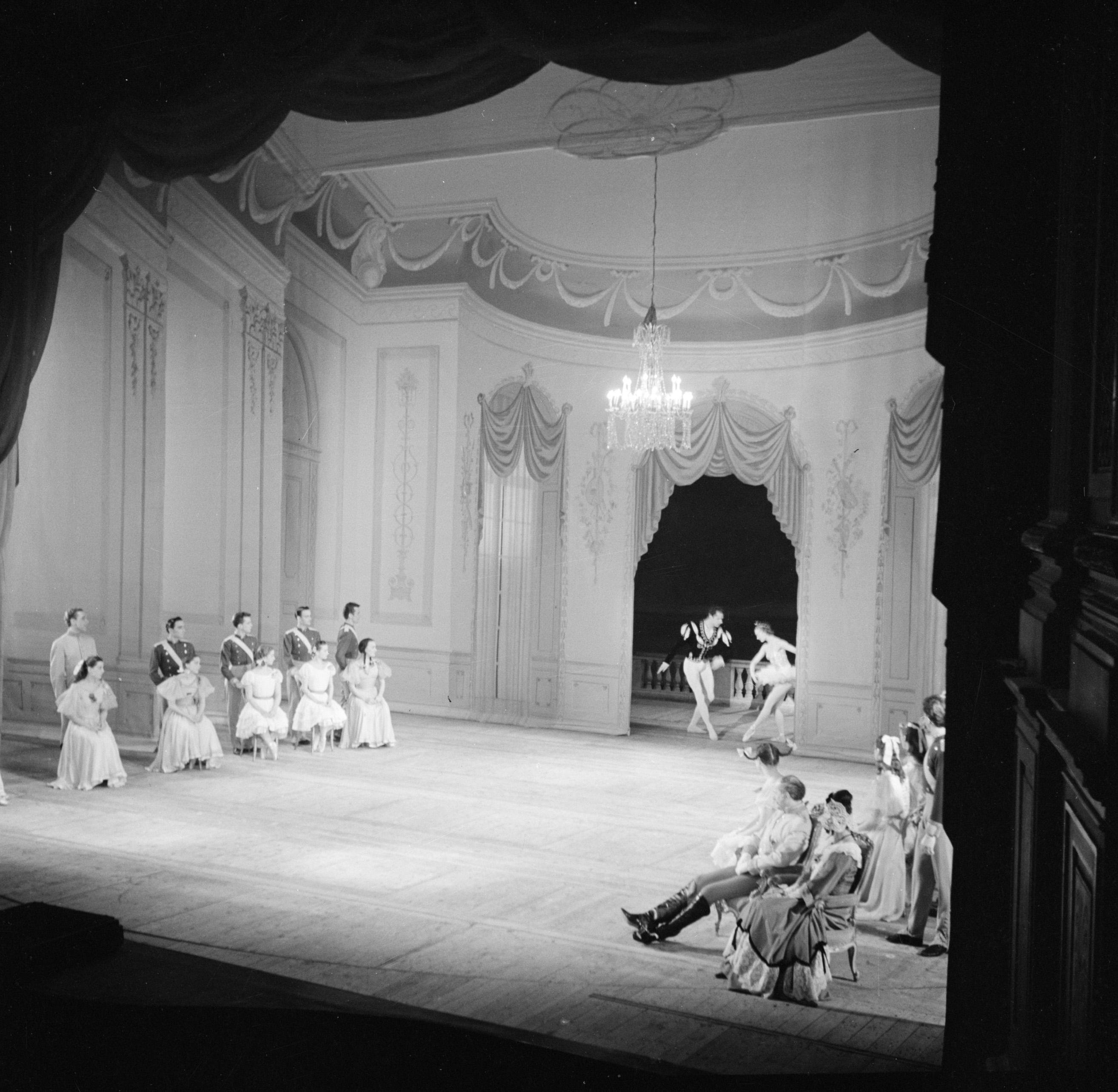
Graduation Ball performed by Royal Danish Ballet in 1954 (photo by Willem van de Poll)

Graduation Ball is a ballet in one act choreographed by David Lichine to music composed by Johann Strauss II and arranged by Antal Doráti. With a scenario devised by Lichine and with scenery and costumes designed by Alexandre Benois, it was first presented by the Original Ballet Russe at the Theatre Royal, Sydney, Australia, on 1 March 1940.

The ballet is set in a fashionable Viennese finishing school for girls during the 1840s. The headmistress has invited the cadets of the city's military academy to attend a ball celebrating the graduation of the senior class. The senior and junior girls have planned a series of divertissements as the evening's entertainment and are greatly excited by the event. Flirtations, exuberant dances, and a secret romance ensue.

== Original cast ==
Besides the principal couple, Graduation Ball required a large cast of soloists and corps de ballet dancers. The Headmistress was played, en travestie, by Borislav Runanine, a character dancer with the company. The Old General, at the head of the platoon of cadets, was portrayed by Igor Schwezoff. As the principal ballerina, Tatiana Riabouchinska was the leader of a group of Junior Girls in a role sometimes known as the Romantic Girl or the Good Girl, and one of her group, Tatiana Leskova, took the featured role of the Pigtail Girl, a tomboyish cut-up sometimes called the Naughty Girl. David Lichine danced the principal male role as the bashful leader of the Junior Cadets in a role sometimes known as the First Cadet or the Shy Cadet.

In the divertissements, Riabouchinska acted as Mistress of Ceremony, introducing the performers of the following numbers:

- "The Drummer": a solo for Nicholas Orloff
- "La Sylphide and the Scotsman": a pas de deux for Natasha Sobinova and Paul Petroff
- "Dance-Step Competition": a duet for Alexandra Denisova and Geneviève Moulin
- "Mathematics and Natural History Lesson": a trio for Helene Lineva as the Mathematics Professor, Maria Azrova as the Natural History Professor, and Marina Svetlova as their unfortunate pupil, the Student
- "Perpetuum Mobile": a pas de deux for Riabouchinska and Lichine

== Synopsis ==
The curtain opens to reveal a formal drawing room. Soon, groups of Junior and Senior Girls enter to inspect the premises and begin excitedly to prepare for the ball. The Headmistress comes to make sure that all is in order. The Old General arrives, leading a platoon of cadets. At first the cadets and the girls are timid, standing apart, but the Pigtail Girl breaks the ice, and the young people soon begin to dance with each other. The Mistress of Ceremony introduces the divertissements, which are interrupted by an "Impromptu Dance" by the Pigtail Girl. When the entertainment has concluded, the Headmistress sends her students and the cadets off stage, to have dinner.

While they are gone, the Headmistress and the Old General dance a "Mazurka Flirtation," revealing their attraction. The young people enter and are delighted to find the elderly couple embracing. Everyone dances a high-spirited galop, bringing the evening to a grand finale. The ball is over. Everyone leaves. After the ballroom has emptied, the Pigtail Girl and one of the Junior Cadets sneak back in to see each other again. The Old General and the Headmistress have also re-entered to see each other, but their assignation is spoiled when they see the young couple. Thereupon, the cadet is led out by the ear and the Pigtail Girl is spanked off stage. The curtain closes.

== Production details ==
During his development of the scenario for Graduation Ball in 1939–40, David Lichine worked closely with both music director Antal Doráti and designer Alexandre Benois. Doráti created the score for the ballet by selecting some less-familiar works of Johann Strauss II and weaving them into a coherent sequence. These included:

- "Acceleration Waltz", Op. 234 (Opening)
- "Tritsch-Tratsch-Polka", Op. 214
- "Perpetuum Mobile", Op. 257
- "Flugschriften" ('Pamphlets') Waltz, Op. 300 (waltz of the cadets and the girls)
- "Feuilleton Walzer", Op. 293 (Pigtail Girl Variation)
- "Auf der Jagd", Op. 373
- "Feenmarchen", Op. 312 (Sylphide and the Scotsman)
- "Express", Op. 311 (Finale)
- "Kammerball-Polka", Op. 230 (Finale)
- "Une Bagatelle", Op. 187 (Mazurka Flirtation)
- and several polkas and galops merged for accompaniment to the grand ballabile.

Doráti himself conducted the orchestra at the premiere performance.

Benois, who designed the set for the formal ballroom and the colorful costumes, offered Lichine many choices, producing designs for a number of characters that were dropped before the final version of the scenario. His costumes for the Junior Girls were white dresses with blue pinafores, for the Senior Girls simple party dresses in pastel colors, and for the cadets white trousers and blue military jackets with white sashes across the shoulders. The Old General was dressed in a red and white uniform with gold braid, and the Headmistress wore a matronly gown in shades of brown. In the divertissements, the Drummer wore a dress uniform, the Sylphide a Romantic tutu, and the Scotsman a kilt.

== History ==
On 2 March 1940, The Sydney Morning Herald reported that the premiere performance of Graduation Ball received twenty-five curtain calls. It had been an immediate success. During the Sydney engagement and on the subsequent Australian tour, it was performed more than sixty times. It was first presented in the United States by the Original Ballet Russe at the 51st Street Theatre in New York City on 6 November 1940, with Riabouchinska and Lichine in their original roles.

After the Australian tour, some changes occurred in the divertissements. The "Mathematics and Natural History Lesson" was dropped, and "Perpetuum Mobile," which originally consisted of a circus number for Riabouchinska and Lichine, was replaced by new choreography for the same dancers and two of the Junior Girls. Further, in revivals of the work, Lichine's original, innovative choreography for the "Dance-Step Competition," consisting of single and double fouettés en tournant combined with pirouettes en attitude, á la seconde, and en arabesque, with different arm positions, was usually changed to less challenging, and less interesting, series of single fouettés, with an occasional double at the dancer's whim and capability.

Graduation Ball became a signature work of the Original Ballet Russe and was performed countless times. Over the years it has been danced by many companies around the world, including American Ballet Theatre, the Australian Ballet, the Ballet della Teatro alla Scala, the Ballet Nacional de Cuba, the Borovansky Ballet, the Companhia Nacional de Bailado, Les Grands Ballets Canadiens, London Festival Ballet, Polski Balet Narodowy, the Royal Danish Ballet, and numerous regional companies associated with ballet schools and academies.
