= German Plisetsky =

Russian writer

German Borisovich Plisetsky (Russian: Плисецкий, Герман Борисович; born 17 May 1931 in Moscow; died 2 December 1992, in Moscow) was a notable Russian poet and translator.

== Personal life ==
German Plisetsky was born in a Jewish family. His parents, Boris Naumovich Plisetsky (1906-1991) and Maria Plisetskaya (born Kulkina, 1905-1991), worked at a printing factory. After graduating from Department of Philology of Moscow State University in 1959, Plisetsky studied at Academy of Arts in Leningrad. Since 1965, he lived in Khimki near Moscow. Plisetsky was married three times and had son Dmitry. His son became a chess master and journalist, deputy chief editor of "Chess in the USSR", who helped Garry Kasparov with creating the series My Great Predecessors. German Plisetsky is a remote relative of Maya Plisetskaya.

== Poetry translations ==
In the late 60's Plisetsky translated 450 poems from Rubaiyat of Omar Khayyam to Russian, which according to literary critics, made him the person "responsible for shaping the national attitude towards Khayyam. His translations of Omar Khayyam were published by Nauka and became enormously popular in Russia. Some of them were composed and performed as songs by Alexander Sukhanov. Plesetsky then translated Hafez, other Middle East poets, and made poetic translation of Ecclesiastes. Lidia Chukovskaya praised him as an extraordinary poetry translator. He was accepted to Soviet Union of Writers after recommendations by Boris Slutsky and Yevgeny Yevtushenko.

== His poetry ==
First well known poem by Plisetsky was "To Memory of Pasternak" written just a few days after funeral of the poet in 1960. The poem condemned persecution of poets in Russia ("Poets, the bastard sons of Russia...") and was praised by Anna Akhmatova as the best piece written on the death of Pasternak His another famous poem, "Tube", was about thousands people who died in the stampede on Trubnaya Square (literally "Tube's Square") in Moscow during Stalin's funeral in 1953. It was written twelve years after the event. The poem ends by words: "Avant, avant! Retreat has been cut off, closed like a hatch, not liftable by hand... And that is all we are let to understand". According to Yuz Aleshkovsky, the poem was "a part of the cumbersome gravestone that bury the paranoid tyrant and other monsters of time, his henchmen who were fatally brainwashed by Stalin". According to another review, the ending of "Tube" (and that is all we are let to understand) reminds verses of Khayyam that Plisetsky translated much later, whereas some of his later translations of Khayyam sound almost anti-Soviet.

Except for a few early publications in periodicals, his own poetry remained unpublished in the Soviet Union during 25 years for ideological reasons as "dead-ended" and overly pessimistic. His work was known in Russia only through samizdat and from publications abroad in émigré magazines Grani (published in Frankfurt, 1967) and Kontinent (1980). A small collection of his poetry was published in Russia only in 1990. The first full collection of his poems and selected translations "From Khayyam to Ecclesiastes" was released in Moscow in 2001
