= Flugschriften =

Waltz by Johann Strauss II

Flugschriften ('Pamphlets') op. 300 is a waltz by Johann Strauss II written in 1865 and first performed on January 17, 1866, at the Habsburg Court Ball in the Rittersaal of the Imperial Hofburg Palace graced by the Emperor Franz Josef and Empress Elisabeth. The waltz had earlier been intended to be dedicated for the occasion of the annual ball of the Vienna Authors' and Journalists' Association 'Concordia' ball held at the Sofienbad-saal ballroom on January 21, 1866.

For the Fasching of 1866, Strauss had dedicated three new waltzes and 'Flugschriften' belongs to one of the composer's inspired creations in 3/4 time. The waltz begins with a plaintive Introduction with clarinets and oboes. As the music progresses, the mood became tense and a short chord interrupts, heralding the graceful 1st waltz section. The plaintive mood was reintroduced in the 2nd waltz section before an exuberant 3rd section. Further melodies are introduced but such were the musical ideas of the work that it would not be triumphant and joyful. The coda recalls earlier waltz sections, rounded up by the re-entry of the first waltz section and a spirited close with a snare drumroll and regular brass flourish.

The waltz also inspired Antal Doráti to include the 2nd waltz section and the coda in his 1940 pastiche ballet 'Graduation Ball'.

== Source ==
- Based on original text by Peter Kemp, The Johann Strauss Society of Great Britain. Used with permission.
