= Alexandra Denisova =

Canadian ballerina (1922–2018)

Alexandra Denisova (Russian: Александра Денисова; September 22, 1922 - July 5, 2018), real name Patricia Denise Meyers Galian, was a Canadian ballerina. Born in Canada, she started taking classical ballet lessons in childhood.

After the October Revolution, many artistic and cultural professionals, including ballet dancers and choreographers, emigrated from Russia, bringing with them the typical Russian forms of ballet, which was developing mostly independently from the Western trends since the 19th century and followed classic forms long abandoned in the West. As the Russian ballet enjoyed great popularity in the West, these emigrants were always in great demand. It is due to this popularity that the European dancers started to adopt Russian pseudonyms. Young Patricia Galian also followed this trend and started to perform as Alexandra Denisova.

Before the beginning of World War II, she worked in troupe of Original Ballet Russe — OBR (other name is Ballets Russes de Monte-Carlo). The troupe went on tour in the different countries, first of all making tour across Europe. All were broken by the Second World War: tours across Europe have been cancelled. The route has changed in a direction to the South America. Soon troupe Original Ballet Russe gave representations in Havana. One of founders of troupe Vasily Voskresensky, the former officer of the Russian imperial army, having brought troupe to Cuba, to Havana, has decided to meet the old colleague-officer who has settled there — Nikolay Yavorsky.

Nikolay Yavorsky wasn't the professional dancer too, but once in young years he has been given to training to ballet. In emigration this knowledge was useful. He began to give lessons of ballet skill. Among his pupils there were brothers Fernando Alonso (1914) and Alberto Alonso (1917—2007) and a girl Alicia Ernestina de la Caridad del Cobre Martínez Hoya. Fernando Alonso and Alicia married; Alicia became Alicia Alonso. Alberto Alonso began his dance career aged 17 in 1936 with Original Ballet Russe where he became the partner, and then the husband of ballerina Alexandra Denisova. Alberto Alonso and Alexandra Denisova married in May 1939 in Melbourne.

Tours in Australia were tightened, in 1940 during this tours David Lichine created the ballet Graduation Ball (Alexandra Denisova as one of girl). To return to Europe at war it was impossible. It was reflected in the troupe finance. Some dancers have left troupe to America which was far from war. As a result, Alexandra Denisova accepted all roles of a star of troupe Irina Baronova, and has coped with them so successfully that critic Arnold Haskell marked in the publication in the newspaper The Home on April 1, 1940:

Young Denisova during the season danced many of her (Baronova) roles. For any ballerina to undertake this means shouldering an initial handicap, but the Canadian girl proved her mettle and earned high praise. (Arnold Haskell, The Home, April 1, 1940).

Alberto Alonso has been occupied in many parties too. But the family began to fall. Denisova and Alberto separated in 1944, while on vacation in the United States, and she was never to return to Cuba. She began to live in the US, Los Angeles.

She acted at different theaters in ballets of Michel Fokine (Paganini), David Lichine (Rhapsody, 1946), George Balanchine (Song of Norway, 1946) etc.

Denisova's career continued in Hollywood, with small roles dancing when she has removed her Russian pseudonym: films On an Island with You — 1948 (in several scenes she replaced ill Cyd Charisse), Two Tickets to Broadway — 1951, Singin' in the Rain — 1952, Knock on Wood — 1954, Three for the Show — 1955, Meet Me in Las Vegas — 1956, Marjorie Morningstar — 1958 etc.

In the 1950s she had a position of Assistant to the Dance Director in the Metro-Goldwyn-Mayer studios.

Fragments with his participation (with the real name Patricia Denise Galian) have entered into a film Ballets Russes ([San Francisco, CA] : Geller/Goldfine Productions; New York, NY : Zeitgeist Films, ©2006).
