= Shukriyya Akhundzada =

Wife of Azerbaijani poet Ahmad Javad (1902–1993)

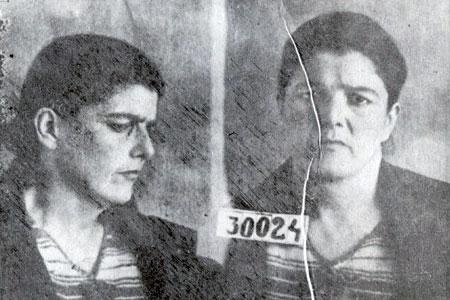
- NKVD mugshot, 1937
- Born: 1902; Batumi, Caucasus Viceroyalty, Russian Empire
- Died: October 1993 (aged 90–91); Çinarlı, Shamkir, Azerbaijan
- Other names: Shukriyya Javad
- Spouse: Ahmad Javad

Shukriyya Akhundzada (Azerbaijani: Şükriyyə Axundzadə; 1902 – October 1993), also known as Shukriyya Javad (Azerbaijani: Şükriyyə Cavad) was the wife of the Azerbaijani poet Ahmad Javad and a victim of the Stalinist repressions in Azerbaijan.

In 1937, she was arrested along with her husband. Shukriyya was sentenced to eight years of exile at the Akmolinsk Camp of Wives of Traitors to the Motherland in modern-day northern Kazakhstan. She was released in 1945 and acquitted in 1955 after being found innocent. Her life inspired several plays, books, and songs, as well as numerous theater performances.

== Biography ==
Shukriyya Suleyman gizi Bejanidze was born to an ethnic Adjarian noble house in 1902 in the city of Batumi, then part of the Caucasus viceroyalty of the Russian Empire, modern day Georgia. She completed her high school in Batumi and was fluent in Georgian, Ajar, Turkish and Russian.

She met Ahmad Javad in 1914 while he was living in Batumi as the secretary of the Turkish Army Aid Fund. Despite efforts to arrange a marriage through intermediaries, Shukriyya's father was against the match. As a result, Shukriyya and Ahmad Javad eloped and started a family in Ganja, modern-day Azerbaijan.

In 1920, after the April occupation, Ahmad Javad was appointed as a teacher in Qusar. Shukriyya, along with her family, moved to Xuluq, a village in Qusar. They lived there until 1922, after which they moved to Baku, the capital of the Azerbaijan Soviet Socialist Republic.

On the night of 3 June 1937, Ahmad and his wife Shukriyya were arrested with accusations of trying to spread Musavat-inspired nationalism in young Azerbaijani poets. After Ahmad Javad's arrest, Shukriyya was offered the option of divorcing Ahmad Javad and returning to her maiden surname to avoid further punishment or exile. However, she refused divorce. After being held in detention for some time as a "family member of an enemy of the people", on 9 December, she was sentenced to eight years in prison. She was sent to a labor camp, Akmolinsk Camp of Wives of Traitors to the Motherland, on 2 February 1938.

On 14 October 1945, when her prison term ended, she was released and returned to the Azerbaijan Soviet Socialist Republic. She moved to Shamkir as she had been denied permission to live in Baku. After returning from exile, she believed for several years that Ahmad Javad was still alive, making several appeals to various state authorities and the head of the USSR Council of Ministers, in an attempt to meet with him in prison. In 1955, she received the news that Ahmad Javad had been killed 18 years earlier, in 1937. She was finally acquitted in December 1955.

In October 1993, she died in the village of Çinarlı, in Shamkir, Azerbaijan.

== Legacy ==
In 1917, Ahmad Javad dedicated a poem titled "For my Shukriyya" (Azerbaijani: Şükriyyəm üçün) to Shukriyya. Later, Emin Sabitoglu composed music for this poem, and the song was performed by many artists under the title Şükriyyə taleyim.

In 2018, a book titled Cavad və Şükriyyə dastanı (The Story of Javad and Shukriyya) written by the author Sevinc Adalatgizi was presented.

In 2021, the author Ulviyya Tahir wrote a historical novel titled Şükriyyə taleyim about Shukriyya Akhundzada and her life in exile.

On 17 December 2022, the premiere of the play Kod adı: V. X. A. Or Kod adı: Vətən xainlərinin arvadları took place at the Azerbaijan State Youth Theater. The play focuses on the events that befell the wives of political prisoners during the Stalin repressions, including the tragic life of Shukriyya Javad.

On 30 June 2023, the premiere of the play Şükriyyə took place at the Azerbaijan State Academic National Drama Theatre. This play is based on Cavid Zeynalli's Şükriyyə and centers on Shukriyya Akhundzada's life in exile in Kazakhstan. The innovative director of the play is the Distinguished Artist of the Arts, Bahram Osmanov.

== Family ==
Her father, Süleyman Bey Bejanidze, belonged to the lineage of the noble princes of Adjara. Their ancestors hailed from the village of Zendidi, part of modern day Turkey, where the family had burial sites, properties, and ports.

Shukriyya and Ahmad Javad had five children; four sons, Niyazi, Aydın, Tuqay, Yılmaz, and one daughter, Almaz. In 1936, their daughter Almaz died at the age of 16 due to sarcoma.

After the murder of Ahmad Javad and the exile of Shukriyya Akhundzada, their two-year-old son, Yılmaz, was placed in a foster home. The 14-year-old Tuqay was sent to an orphanage intended for children in need of a strict upbringing, and the 16-year-old Aydın was sent to the Keshla prison.
