= Alberto Alonso =

Cuban dancer and choreographer (1917–2007)

- Born: Alberto Julio Alonso Rayneri; 22 May 1917; Havana, Cuba
- Died: 31 December 2007 (aged 90); Gainesville, Florida, U.S
- Occupation(s): Ballet dancer, choreographer
- Spouses: Alexandra Denisova (m. 1939–1944) Elena del Cueto (m. 1946–1962) Sonia Calero (m. 1964)
- Children: Maria Victoria Alonso, Maria Elena Alonso and Alberto Jr

Alberto Julio Rayneri Alonso (22 May 1917 – 31 December 2007) was a Cuban dancer and choreographer, the brother of Fernando Alonso and brother-in-law of Alicia Alonso (née Martinez). He was influential in the development of the Cuban style of ballet, a combination of Russian and Western techniques with a Latin style.

== Biography ==
Alonso was born in Havana, and attended Spring Hill College in Mobile, Alabama. On returning to Cuba, he began ballet training in 1932 at the Sociedad Pro-Arte Musical arts school in Havana with Nikolai Yavorsky. He studied in Paris with several teachers including Preobrazhenska and Idzikowski, and danced with the Ballets Russes de Colonel W. de Basil from 1936 to 1940, performing principal roles in several ballets created by Michel Fokine. He subsequently danced with the Ballet Theatre from 1943 to 1945, in works created by Fokine, George Balanchine and Leonid Massine. Back in Cuba in 1948, he co-founded with Alicia and Fernando Alonso the Ballet Alicia Alonso, which would eventually become the Ballet Nacional de Cuba, being its artistic director and choreographer.

From 1942 he also worked as ballet master and choreographer, creating several works including Antes del Alba (1948, music by Hilario Gonzalez, libretto by Francisco Martínez Allende), Rapsodia Negra (1953, music by Ernesto Lecuona), El Solar (1965, music by Tony Taño, filmed as Un día en el solar by Eduardo Manet), Espacio y movimiento (1966, music by Stravinsky, prize for best choreography at Varna in 1968), Un retablo para Romeo y Julieta (1969, to the music of Roméo et Juliette by Berlioz), etc. His most well-known ballet is Carmen Suite (1967), to music by Rodion Shchedrin; it was created for Maya Plisetskaya in the Bolshoi Ballet, and simultaneously for Alicia Alonso in the Ballet Nacional de Cuba, and later it has been re-created by several other companies.

He was married from 1939 to 1944 to the Ballets Russes Canadian dancer Alexandra Denisova. Later he married Elena del Cueto, a Cuban dancer, until 1962, when she left for the United States with their two daughters. In 1964 he married the Cuban Rumba dancer and actress Sonia Calero. They were married until his death and had a son, Alberto Jr.

He left Cuba in 1993 with his third wife, and settled in Gainesville, Florida, where he became master artist in residence at the Santa Fe Community College and resident choreographer for the Dance Theater of Santa Fe. He continued choreographing for several companies including New York's Ballet Hispanico in 1994, and re-creating Carmen for Svetlana Zakharova in the Bolshoi Ballet in 2005.

Alonso died from heart failure in his adopted hometown of Gainesville, Florida, at age 90.

The minor planet 58373 Albertoalonso was named after Alonso in 1995.
