= Alexander Plisetski =

Russian ballet master and choreographer

- Born: 20 October 1931; Moscow, Russia
- Died: 29 October 1985 (aged 54); Moscow, Russia
- Occupation: Balletmaster
- Spouse: Marianna Sedova (m. 1969)
- Children: Anna Plisetskaya
- Parent(s): Mikhail Plisetski (father); Rachel Messerer (mother)
- Relatives: Maya Plisetskaya (sister); Azari Plisetski (brother); Asaf Messerer (uncle); Sulamith Messerer (aunt); Boris Messerer (cousin)

Alexander Mikhailovich Plisetski (Russian: Александр Михайлович Плисецкий) (20 October 1931 — 29 October 1985) was a Russian ballet master and choreographer and a younger brother of the famous Russian ballerina Maya Plisetskaya.

== Biography ==
=== Family ===
Alexander Plisetski was born on 20 October 1931 into the family of a diplomat and an actress, both of Lithuanian Jewish origin.

His father, Mikhail Plisetski (1899–1938), was Consul General of the USSR at the island of Spitsbergen, where he managed the coal concessions (trust "Arctic - carbon"). In 1938 he was purged, charged with espionage and executed. He was rehabilitated on 3 March 1956.

His mother, Rachel Messerer (1902–1993, also known as Ra Messerer), was a silent film actress. Shortly after her husband was arrested, she was sent to a labour camp in Kazakhstan named the “Camp for Wives of Traitors to the Motherland in Akmolinsk”. During her imprisonment, Alexander stayed with the family of her brother, Asaf Messerer, while his elder sister, Maya Plisetskaya, who later became a famous ballerina, was placed in the custody of her sister Sulamith Messerer.

In 1969 Alexander married Marianna Sedova, a ballerina at the Bolshoi Theatre. Their daughter, Anna Plisetskaya (born 1971), became a ballerina and actress.

=== Career ===
- In 1949, graduated from the Moscow State Academy of Choreography.
- From 1949 to 1971 - a ballet soloist of the Bolshoi Theatre.
- From 1965 to 1968 - Professor in Moscow State Academy of Choreography.
- From 1968 to 1985 — Ballet master and Artistic director of ballet in many cities (in particular, since 1972, worked by invitation as Ballet master in Kyiv, Odesa, Ufa, Bashkortostan and Kazan, and, in 1973, with the Finnish National Opera).
- From 1974 to 1976 - founded the ballet in the Universidad Nacional Mayor de San Marcos in Lima.
- From 1976 to 1978 — Professor and choreographer with the Ballet company Teatro Colón in Buenos Aires.
- From 1979 to 1980 - Professor and choreographer with the Finnish National Opera, where he staged the ballet Carmen Suite.
- From 1981 to 1985 - Ballet master with the Tbilisi Opera and Ballet Theatre, where, together with the choreographers Michael Lavrovski (Ru) and George Aleksidze (Ru), staged Porgy and Bess and Romeo and Juliet.
- Obtained permission to stage the ballet Serenade for String Orchestra with choreography by George Balanchine. This ballet was a great success on the stage in November 1984.

== Performances ==
In the period from 1973 to 1985, Alexander Plisetski staged several ballets, including:

- Carmen Suite to the music of Georges Bizet arranged by Shchedrin with choreography by Alberto Alonso
- «Grand Pas Classique» from the ballet Raymonda to music by Glazunov
- Walpurgis Night from the opera Faust by Gounod
- Dances from the opera Turandot and Two widows to the music of Smetana
- Porgy and Bess to the music of Gershwin with choreography by Michael Lavrovski
- Romeo and Juliet to music by Prokofiev
- Serenade to music by Tchaikovsky

Theatres which have hosted Plisetsi's productions include, The Odesa Opera and Ballet Theater, the National Opera of Ukraine, the Tbilisi Opera and Ballet Theatre, the Sydney Opera House, the Finnish National Opera, the Universidad Nacional Mayor de San Marcos and the Teatro Colón.

== Death ==
Plisetski was in need of heart surgery, which should have been carried out in the United States by invitation from Igor Youskevitch; however, due to his choreographic commitments, the operation was postponed. In the last year of his life he was actively involved in the staging of Serenade for Strings, which premiered in Moscow in November 1984.

Plisetski died on 29 October 1985 in Moscow during heart surgery.

== Awards and honours ==
Diploma of the Presidium of the Supreme Council

== Reviews ==
- "... The success of the ballet in Moscow at the Bolshoi Theater and the Central Concert Hall is big and obvious ... one-act ballet to the music of "Serenade for Strings" by Tchaikovsky, resume carefully and anxiously. Alexander Plisetski was able to obtain from the corps de ballet of artistic disciplines, which does not exclude the spirituality of dance ... The very fact of staging "Serenade" looks like a wonderful symbol: Balanchine if returned to his homeland in the hold of his best creations..."
- " ... ballet "Serenade" (choreographer - tutor Alexander Plisetski) pleased with freshness and harmony of plastic paint ..."

== See also ==
- List of Russian ballet dancers
