= Feenmärchen waltz =

Feenmärchen (Fairy-tales) waltz op. 312 is composed by Johann Strauss II in 1866. The same year had witnessed the glaring military weakness of the ailing Habsburg dynasty after a bitter defeat to the hands of the Prussian army at the fateful Battle of Königgrätz. Almost immediately, various Vienna's establishments usually packed with music-lovers dancing the night away took the news with foreboding and many of the year's festivities were cancelled or with-held.

It was during these difficult social times that Strauss and his famous brothers entertained and coaxed the Viennese into enjoying their once-enviable lifestyle again. One such work, the 'Feenmärchen' waltz was first performed at the Vienna Volksgarten on 18 November 1866 during a benefit concert for brothers Josef and Eduard before an adoring public.

Themes from the work was also included by Antal Doráti in his pastiche ballet Graduation Ball (1940) where the plaintive Introduction makes a contribution. The work starts off in a plaintive mood, with the clarinet playing the principal melody. Further themes were suggested before a loud chord introduces the first waltz theme. The entire 'fairy-tale' work was given inspiration throughout its light-hearted menagerie with various instruments of the orchestra. The first waltz theme was played again at the end before a furious section rounds off the work with a strong chord and drumroll.
