= Carmen Suite (ballet) =

1967 ballet

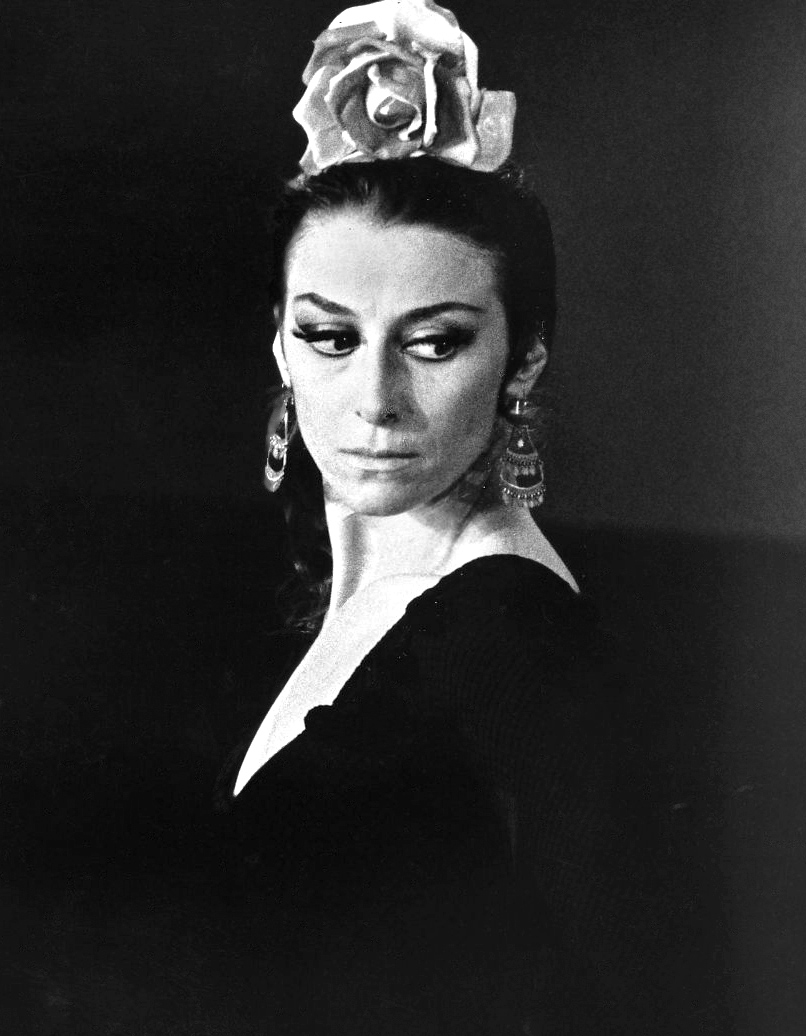
- Maya Plisetskaya as Carmen, 1974
- Choreographer: Alberto Alonso
- Music: Rodion Shchedrin
- Based on: Bizet's Carmen
- Premiere: 20 April 1967; Bolshoi Theatre, Moscow

Carmen Suite is a one-act ballet created in 1967 by Cuban choreographer Alberto Alonso to music by Russian composer Rodion Shchedrin for his wife, prima ballerina assoluta Maya Plisetskaya. The premiere took place on 20 April 1967 at the Bolshoi Theatre, Moscow. The music, taken from Bizet's opera Carmen and arranged for strings and percussion, is not a 19th-century pastiche but rather "a creative meeting of the minds," as Shchedrin put it, with Bizet's melodies reclothed in a variety of fresh instrumental colors (including the frequent use of percussion), set to new rhythms and often phrased with a great deal of sly wit. Initially banned by the Soviet hierarchy as "disrespectful" to the opera for precisely these qualities, the ballet has since become Shchedrin's best-known work and has remained popular in the West for what reviewer James Sanderson calls "an iconoclastic but highly entertaining retelling of Bizet's opera."

== Structure ==
The ballet is in one act containing 13 dance numbers:

1. Introduction: Andante assai
2. Dance: Allegro
3. First Intermezzo: Allegro moderato – Andante moderato – (attacca)
4. Changing of the Guard: Moderato
5. Carmen's Entrance and Habanera: Allegro moderato – Quasi andante
6. Scene: Allegro moderato – Tempo precedente – Andante assai
7. Second Intermezzo: Larghetto
8. Bolero: Allegro vivo
9. Torero: Moderato con stoltezza
10. Torero and Carmen: Lento – Tempo I
11. Adagio: Andante moderato – Adagio
12. Fortune–Telling: Andantino – Andante assai
13. Finale: Allegro – Tempo precedente – Andante assai

== Instrumentation ==
A standard string orchestra of violins, violas, cellos, double basses is augmented by a percussion battery of one timpanist and four members, who play the following:

- Player 1: marimba, vibraphone, xylophone, castanets, three cowbells, four bongos, tubular bells, snare drum, guiro
- Player 2: vibraphone, marimba, snare drum, tambourine, two woodblocks, claves, triangle, guiro
- Player 3: glockenspiel, crotales, maracas, whip, snare drum, cabasa, guiro, three temple blocks, bass drum, tam-tam, tenor drum, triangle
- Player 4: cymbals, bass drum, tam-tam, hi-hat, triangle, tambourine, five tom-toms

Two factors influenced Shchedrin in choosing this instrumentation. The first, he said in an interview with BBC Music Magazine, was that, "to be [as] totally far [as possible]" from Bizet's scoring for the opera, he wanted an ensemble "without brass and woodwind... that gave me many possibilities" for timbral variety. The second was the high level of string and percussion players then available in the Bolshoi orchestra.

== Composition ==
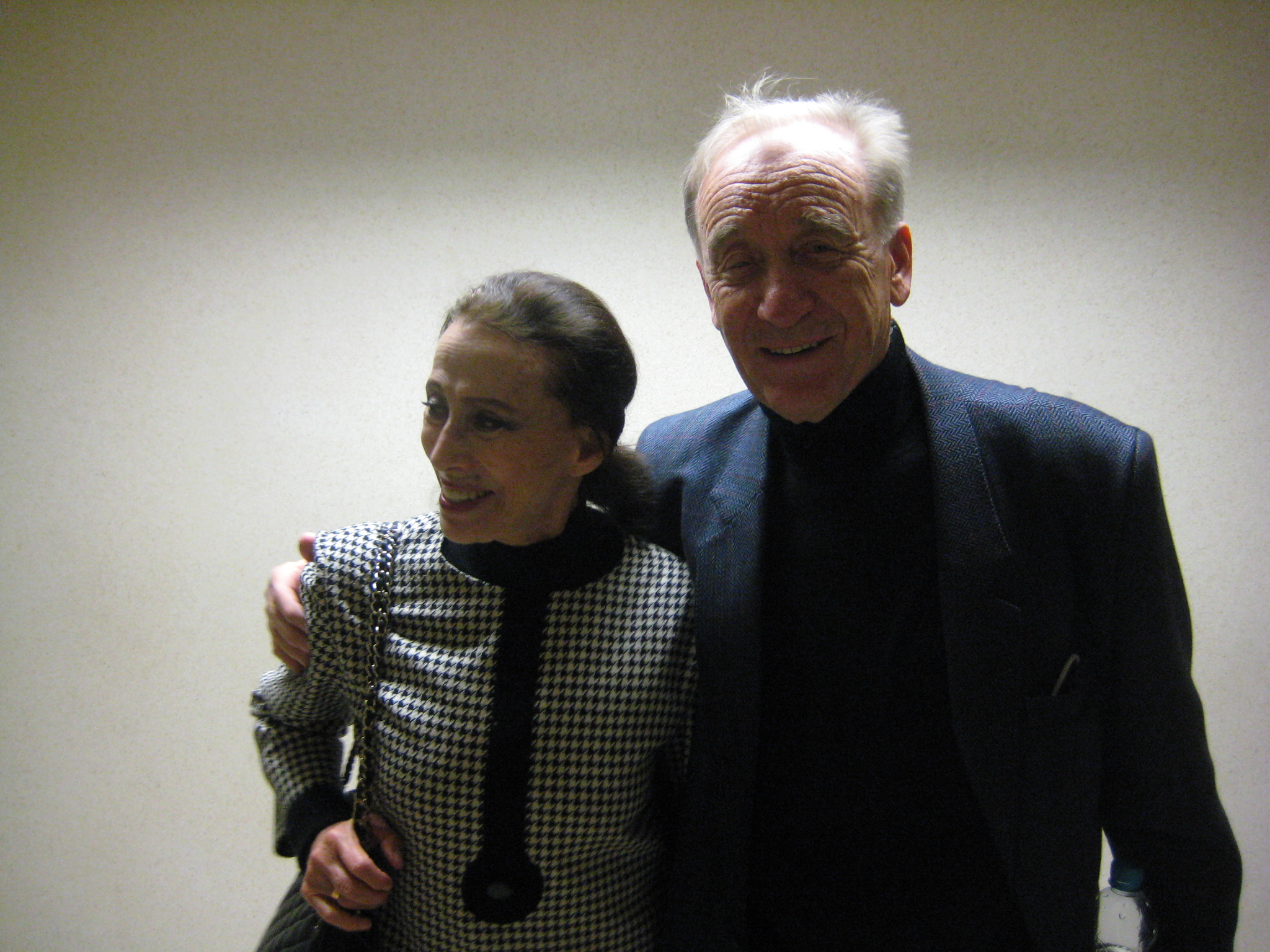
Rodion Shchedrin with his wife, Maya Plisetskaya, in 2009. He wrote Carmen Suite for Plisetskaya

The idea for Carmen Suite originated with Shchedrin's wife, Bolshoi Theatre ballerina Maya Plisetskaya. In 1964, she asked composer Dmitri Shostakovich to compose a ballet on the story of Carmen, since, Shchedrin said, they were both on good terms with him. Shostakovich "gently but firmly refused," Plisetskaya remembers. "I'm afraid of Bizet," he told her half-jokingly. "Everyone is so used to the opera that whatever you write, you'll disappoint them." He suggested that perhaps Shchedrin could "come up with something special" to fulfill her request. Instead, she went to Aram Khachaturian, the composer of the ballets Gayane and Spartacus, but "things never went beyond talking." Shchedrin added that Khachaturian told Plisetskaya, "Why you need me? You have a composer at home, ask him!" It was then, he said, that she asked him to write the music.

In late 1966, the Ballet Nacional de Cuba stopped in Moscow during its Soviet tour. Plisetskaya's mother attended its performances and encouraged her to go. Eventually, Plisetskaya approached the company's choreographer, Alberto Alonso and told him of her desire for a Carmen ballet. Alonso developed the libretto and worked with Ballet Nacional dancers on the choreography, then flew to Moscow to teach the work to Plisetskaya. Shchedrin watched her initial rehearsals with Alonso and agreed to write music for the ballet.

However, as much as he struggled to write an original score for this project, Shchedrin found he could not extricate the story from the music that French composer Georges Bizet wrote for his opera of the same name, a score Shchedrin called "fantastic, one of the best in the whole history of music." Eventually, Shchedrin decided to exploit this connection in what he called "a creative meeting of the minds." With Shostakovich's words in mind, Shchedrin said, "I had to combine ... something fresh ... with these famous melodies." From this motive came the idea to use just strings and percussion for the instrumentation "because then it is a totally modern combination." His intent was to give homage to what Bizet had done and acknowledge the universality of his music in telling the story of Carmen while adding his own ideas to the work. In this way, Andrew Lindemann Malone writes in his description of the ballet, Shchedrin positioned him on a creative middle ground, "making himself if not an equal partner at least something above the level of arranger."

Toward this end, Shchedrin set Bizet's music with a number of clever and unexpected rhythmic twists and subtler changes in notes and chords. This gives the impression of simultaneously recognizing something familiar and being surprised in hearing something slightly distorted about it. Some melodies are "combined for 'found' counterpoint," Malone writes, others interrupted and still more left unaccompanied where Shchedrin assumes the listener knows both music and story all too well. An instance of the last mentioned, Malone writes, is "when a big whipped-up climax in the Torero scene leads to nothing but the lowest percussion, pumping quietly, merrily, and obliviously along." He also adds a number of humorous touches, such as the off-color use of the "Farandole" from Bizet's incidental music to L'Arlésienne and the sudden, unexpected hesitations in the Toreador Song. None of these changes obfuscate either the general melodic curves of Bizet's music—all the familiar tunes are easily recognizable—or the intricacies of the plot.

Shchedrin's orchestration proved equally unexpected and creative. Eschewing the full orchestra of Bizet for one of strings and an enlarged percussion section, he "boldly overhauled" the orchestral sound, as Sanderson phrases it, with a greatly widened timbrel range enhancing the sharpened rhythms and sudden hairpin turns in phrasing and mood. The Habanera, Malone says, is introduced "in a bouncy duet" for vibraphone and tympani, while various percussion instruments accentuate separate notes in the "Changing of the Guard" scene to "unexpectedly rattle" the melodic line." The full extent of Shchedrin's emendations and their faithfulness to Bizet and the story, Malone writes, are both shown in the finale of the ballet: "melodies get twisted, thrown to exotic percussion, and otherwise trampled, but the resulting music, with its passionate climax and coda of distant bells and pizzicato strings, still has gravity and depth, due both to Bizet and to Shchedrin's interventions."

== Roles ==
- Carmen, a gypsy woman
- Don José, corporal of Dragoons
- Escamillo, a bullfighter (toreador)
- Zúñiga, captain of Dragoons
- Fate
- Magistrate

== Synopsis ==
Place: Seville, Spain, and surrounding hills
Time: Around 1820

Alonso's scenario centers on Carmen, Don José and the bullfighter Escamillo. Carmen is a passionate, free-spirited woman in contrast to the temperamental and fickle Don José. Fate, a ballerina dressed in black and a representation of Carmen's alter ego, tells Carmen's fortune with a deck of cards. A fight with tobacco dealers leads to Carmen's arrest by Captain Zúñiga. In jail, she seduces Don José and convinces him to release her. Carmen is subsequently caught in a love triangle between Don José and popular bullfighter Escamillo.

Boris Messerer's sets included a mock bullring which symbolizes life, uniting the bullfight and Carmen's destiny in a sinister personage. Masked spectators and a uniformed judge represent society's disapproval for the unconventional behavior of Carmen and her lovers. Fate reappears in the final act playing the role of a bull and the three main characters meet in the arena. Carmen dances alternatively with Fate, Escamillo and Don José until she is stabbed. She dies caressing Don José's face, revealing him as the assassin.

== Official ban ==
The Bolshoi premiered Carmen Suite in 1967 but the fact that Bizet's music was so well-known actually worked against its favor, at first. Soviet Minister of Culture Yekaterina Furtseva, was repelled by the modernist flavor given to the music and the sexual overtones of both the story and the title character. She banned the work immediately following its premiere as "insulting" to Bizet's masterpiece. Explaining this, Furtseva commented to Soviet media, "We cannot allow them to make a whore out of Carmen, the heroine of the Spanish people." Unfortunately for Furtseva, her words were taken as a joke among the Moscow public following the controversy. When she met privately at the Bolshoi with Plisetskaya and other members, Furtseva called Carmen Suite "a great failure," the production "raw. Nothing but eroticism. The opera's music has been mutilated. The concept has to be rethought. I have grave doubts as to whether the ballet can be redone."

Not long after the meeting with Furtseva, Shostakovich called the ministry about Carmen Suite. He told Furtseva that he considered the ballet both a masterly transcription and highly effective dance music. At this time, Shostakovich was First Secretary of the Composer's union of the Russian Soviet Federative Socialist Republic (RSFSR); this made him effectively leader of that union. Even if it were not meant as an official call and regardless of his official position still being subservient to hers, the fact it was Shostakovich calling might have still carried some cachet. Because of this personal intervention, the ban was lifted. Plisetskaya confessed in her autobiography that without Shostakovich's help, the ban on Carmen Suite might have remained permanent.

Shostakovich's call did not end all official interference with the ballet, however. Carmen Suite had been planned for the Bolshoi's upcoming tour of Canada as part of Expo 67, scheduled to be held in Montreal. In fact, the Canadian impresario assisting with the Bolshoi on the tour, Nikolai Kudryavtsev, had specifically requested it and felt it would be highly appropriate. Kudryavtsev, assured by the Ministry of Culture that Carmen Suite would be included, booked the Maple Leaf Gardens and began advertising Plisetskaya's appearance in it, expecting a full audience of 6,000. However, when he arrived in Moscow in July 1967 to sign contracts, he was told that Furtseva had seen the ballet and decided it would not be shown in Canada. The objection at that time appeared to be that Plisetskaya had danced in "very abbreviated black tights."

Two weeks later, Kudryavtsev, who was then in Vienna, was asked by the Soviets to a meeting at Furtseva's office in Moscow. The meeting lasted from 10:00 AM to 5:00 PM and consisted mainly, as he recalled later to Canadian poet and diplomat Robert Ford, of "a running battle between Plisetskaya and Furtseva." Furtseva told Plisetskaya that not only would Carmen Suite not be included but that she was to tell the foreign press that the work was not ready to be performed. When told this, Plisetskaya refused to go on tour and that if she were forced to do so, she would tell the foreign press the truth about Carmen Suite. At one point, Kudryavtsev remembered, Furtseva accused Shchedrin of plagiarism for claiming Carmen Suite "was his own work when 'everyone knew that it had been written by a French composer, Bizet.'" Plisetskaya demanded that Furtseva withdraw this charge or she would never dance again, either in the Soviet Union or abroad. Kudryavtsev told Ford that Furtseva said this was fine by her as Plisetskaya was too old to continue dancing anyway. Plisetskaya, in her version of the meeting, said that Furtseva "screeched" that Plisetskaya would be "a traitor to classical ballet" by leaving, to which she did not reply. As it turned out, Plisetskaya became seriously ill and could not go on the tour. Carmen Suite was not performed but the sets were shipped regardless. (Note: Instead of Carmen Suite, the Bolshoi offered Don Quixote danced by Ekaterina Maximova. Only 2,500 people attended, which made the performance a financial disaster (Ruud, 150).)

With its sets still abroad, Carmen Suite could not be performed for the 50-year celebration of the October Revolution. Once they were returned, the Bolshoi was allowed to stage the ballet, which became popular with Moscow audiences. In 1968, Premier Alexei Kosygin saw and praised it. When a tour of Great Britain was scheduled for later that year and the British impresario requested Carmen Suite, the Ministry of Culture agreed.

== Critical reactions ==
In the April 1969 issue of Gramophone, reviewer Edward Greenfield called Carmen Suite "A real curiosity" and, while "a skilful hotchpotch on popular themes [that] has its attractions," it was "Not the sort of thing, then, that is going to endear itself to the US State Department"—a nod to the work's Soviet-Cuban roots and the Cold War climate prevailing at the time. More recent commentators seem to have taken the ballet's tongue-in-cheekiness more in stride. In his review of the Kremlin Chamber Orchestra recording, Sanderson calls the ballet "an iconoclastic but highly entertaining retelling of Bizet's opera," and John Armstrong, in his BBC Music review of the Mikhail Pletnev–Russian National Orchestra recording, writes that in Carmen Suite, "you get all the familiar tunes dressed up in a way Bizet would never have imagined, and with a sly grin and a twinkle in the eye." The music is still not universally loved, though. In his review of the Pletnev recording, Raymond Tuttle calls Shchedrin's efforts "a sort of classical 'bachelor pad' takeover, half lurid and half disturbing, of Bizet's immortal soul" and notes "the score's incipient vulgarity" and "grotesque elements."

Like the music, the ballet still comes under critical fire at times. In a New York Times 2011 review of the Mariinsky staging, Alastair Macaulay faults Alonso for turning "the dance impulse in Bizet’s music into something heavier and more clumsily expressionistic," then adds,

Nothing about "Carmen Suite" is remotely subtle, though the narrative makes Carmen look considerably more dishonest about her change of erotic allegiance (from José to the Torero) than in the opera. The characters keep posing for us and one another; steps are hurled flamboyantly, like stunts. Early on it seems Carmen is the bullfighter aiming her darts at first one lover, then the next; but a final quartet — featuring her, José, the Torero and Fate — proceeds through a certain amount of partner changing until Carmen lies dead at José’s feet and Fate at the Torero’s. (It’s not often that you come away feeling Fate got a rough deal.)
