= Rachel Messerer =

Russian actress (1902–1993)

- Messerer in 1924
- Born: Rachel Mikhailovna Messerer; 4 March 1902; Vilna, Russian Empire
- Died: 20 March 1993 (aged 91); Moscow, Russia
- Other name: Ra Messerer
- Occupation: Silent film actress
- Years active: 1925–1930
- Spouse: Mikhail Plisetski (died 1938)
- Children: 3, including Maya and Alexander
- Relatives: Asaf Messerer (brother); Azary Azarin (brother); Sulamith Messerer (sister); Boris Messerer (nephew); Anna Plisetskaya (granddaughter)

Rachel Mikhailovna Messerer-Plisetskaya (Russian: Рахиль Михайловна Мессерер-Плисецкая; 4 March 1902 – 20 March 1993), also known by her stage name Ra Messerer, was a Russian silent film and theatre actress.

== Family ==
Rachel Messerer was born in Vilna into the Lithuanian Jewish family of dentist Mikhail Messerer and his wife Sima Shabad. She was one of nine children: each child was given a biblical name: Pnina, Azariah, Mattany, Rachel, Asaf (or Assaf), Elisheva, Sulamith (or Shulamith), Emanuel, Abinadab and Erella. Rachel, her brother Azary Azarin (an actor), sister Sulamith Messerer (ballerina) and brother Asaf Messerer (ballet dancer, choreographer) became famous and started a dynasty of outstanding ballet dancers and ballet masters.

She married well-known Russian diplomat Mikhail Plisetski (1899–1938) and they had three children: famous ballerina Maya Plisetskaya (1925–2015), talented ballet master Alexander Plisetski (1931–1985) and principal dancer Azari Plisetski (b. 1937). Her granddaughter Anna Plisetskaya (b. 1971) is also a ballerina.

== Career ==
Messerer graduated from Institute of Cinematography in 1925 (class of Lev Kuleshov). During the early years of the Soviet system, Messerer starred at the "Bukhkino" and "The Star of the East" studios. Ra Messerer's film career was rather short, because soon after her wedding she devoted herself to the family and her husband, who represented the Soviet Government in Spitsbergen, being the Soviet Consul General in Barentsburg and chief of coal mines. On 30 April 1937, her husband Mikhail Plisetski was purged, charged with espionage and executed on 8 January 1938.

In early March 1938, Messerer was arrested. The secret police agents demanded of Messerer to confirm that her husband was "a spy, a traitor, a saboteur, a criminal, and a participant of the conspiracy against Stalin." Rather bravely for those years, she refused and was sentenced to 8 years in prison. Her daughter Maya faced the threat of an orphanage; she was adopted by her aunt Sulamith. Her son Alexander was taken in by the family of Rachel's brother Asaf Messerer. These events caused many troubles to Asaf and Sulamith. In summer 1939, Rachel was transferred to "ALZhIR" (Akmolinsk Camp for Wives of Traitors to the Motherland) in Kazakhstan.

Messerer was released in 1941, only two months before the start of the Great Patriotic War. After her release, she never restarted her acting career. In those days, no director would have risked his career by offering her work. Nevertheless, she believed that her husband was alive and would come back some day. On 3 March 1956, she learned the truth: in the papers on rehabilitation of Mikhail Plisetski, the execution date of his execution was disclosed: 8 January 1938.

== Filmography ==
- 1927 — "The second wife" (Russian: "Вторая жена", "Uzbekgoskino", director - M.I. Doronin)
- 1928 — "Leper" ( "Uzbekgoskino")
- 1928 — "Valley of Tears" (Russian: "Долина слёз" ("Dolina slyoz") 1-st factory Goskino, director - Alexander Razumny).
- 1929 — "One hundred and twenty thousand a year" ("Mezhrabpomfilm")

== Documentary ==
- In 2007, a documentary film The Star from outside was made about Messerer. For the production, the tapes of the Russian movie-archive "Gosfilmofond RF" were used. Produced by TC "Gamajun" – Director and screenwriter Firdavs Zaynutdinov. Cinematography by Eugene Kutuzkin. Narrator – Irina Apeksimova. Produced for REN TV. Broadcaster – the Russian TV channel "Culture".
