= Boris Messerer =

Soviet and Russian theater artist, set designer and teacher

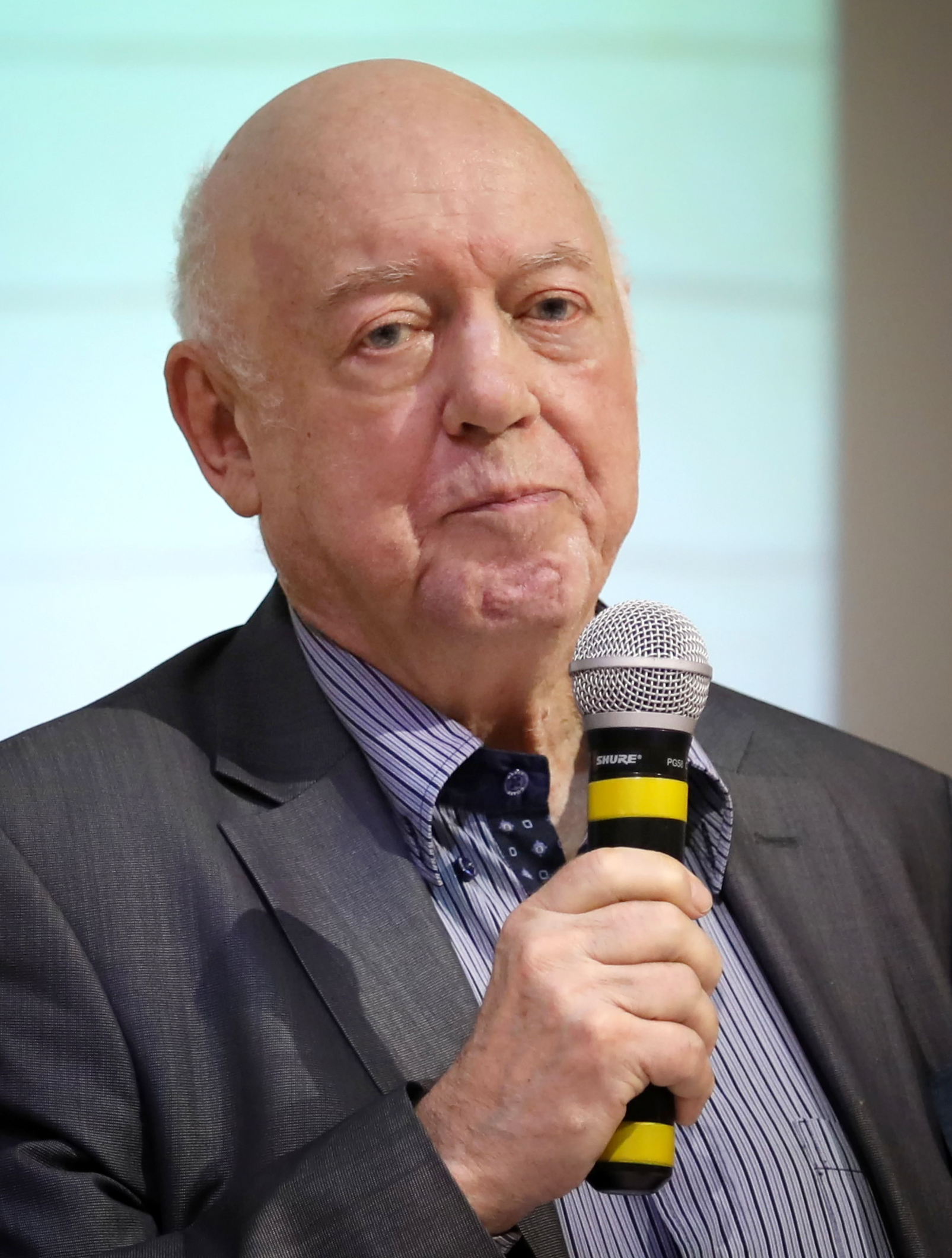
- Born: Boris Asafovich Messerer; 15 March 1933 (age 93); Moscow
- Occupations: stage designer, teacher, theater artist
- Spouse(s): Nina Chistova (1 child together) Bella Akhmadulina (m. 1974; died 2010)
- Children: Alexander Messerer
- Parent(s): Asaf Messerer (father); Anel Sudakevich (mother)
- Relatives: Rachel Messerer (aunt); Sulamith Messerer (aunt); Maya Plisetskaya (cousin); Alexander Plisetski (cousin); Azary Plisetski (cousin)

Boris Asafovich Messerer (Russian: Бори́с Аса́фович Мессере́р; born March 15, 1933, in Moscow) is a Soviet and Russian theater artist, set designer and teacher. President of the association of artists of theater, cinema and television in Moscow.

Academician of the Russian Academy of Arts (1997, Corresponding Member of 1990). People's Artist of the Russian Federation (1993). Winner of two State Prizes of the Russian Federation (1995, 2002). Member of the USSR Union of Artists in 1960, Union of Theatre Workers of the Russian Federation and Union of Cinematographers of the Russian Federation. In 2016 he became a member of the Board of Trustees Fazil Iskander International Literary Award

== Family ==
He was born to ballet dancer, teacher and choreographer Asaf Messerer and silent film actress Anel Sudakevich. The ballerina Sulamith Messerer and the actress Rachel Messerer were his paternal aunts and the actor Azary Azarin his paternal uncle. Through his aunt Rachel he was cousin to Maya Plisetskaya, Alexander Plisetski and Azary Plisetski.

He was married twice. From his first wife, Nina Chistova, he had his only child, Alexander Messerer. His son is a painter and has seven children. His second wife was poet and translator Bella Akhmadulina. They were married from 1974 to her death in 2010. Boris was her fourth husband.

== Awards ==
- 1995 — State Prize of the Russian Federation in the field of fine art
- 2001 — Gold Medal of the Russian Academy of Arts
- 2002 — State Prize of the Russian Federation in the field of design
- 2003 — Order of Honour
- 2008 — Crystal Turandot
- 2008 — Order "For Merit to the Fatherland" 4th class
- 2013 — Order of Friendship
