= Asaf Messerer =

Russian ballet dancer (1903–1992)

Asaf Mikhailovich Messerer (Russian: Асаф Михайлович Мессерер; 19 November 1903 – 7 March 1992) was a Russian and Soviet ballet dancer, teacher and choreographer.

== Life ==
He was born in Vilna (present-day Lithuania). In 1919, he studied privately with Mikhail Mordkin, until Alexander Gorsky placed him in a class at the Bolshoi Ballet School, from which he graduated in 1921. He then joined the Bolshoi Theatre, where he became one of its most important principal soloists, a position he retired from in 1954.

Today Messerer is best remembered as a choreographer and an instructor; he was both the choreographer and ballet master for the Bolshoi Theatre. His book Classes in Classical Ballet is a thorough study of proper ballet technique and is still used today.

== Personal life ==
Messerer was the brother of Sulamith Messerer and Rachel Messerer and the uncle of Maya Plisetskaya, Alexander Plisetski and Azari Plisetski, as well as of Mikhail Messerer. He was married to silent film star, Anel Sudakevich. They had one son, theatre artist Boris Messerer. He won multiple awards from the Soviet Union and Lithuania.

== See also ==
- List of Russian ballet dancers
