= Sulamith Messerer =

Russian ballerina and choreographer (1908–2004)

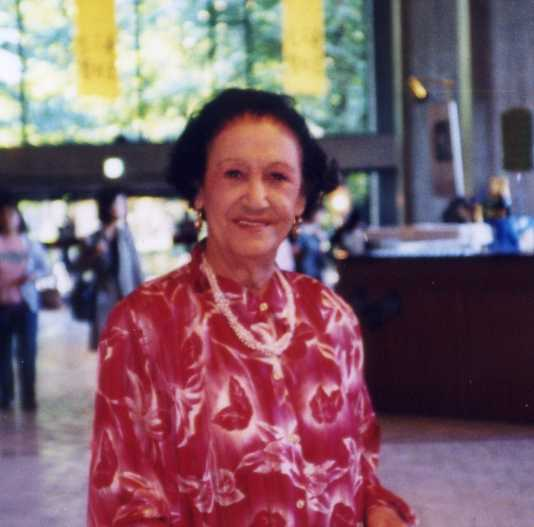
- Born: August 27, 1908; Moscow, Russia
- Died: June 3, 2004 (aged 95); London, England

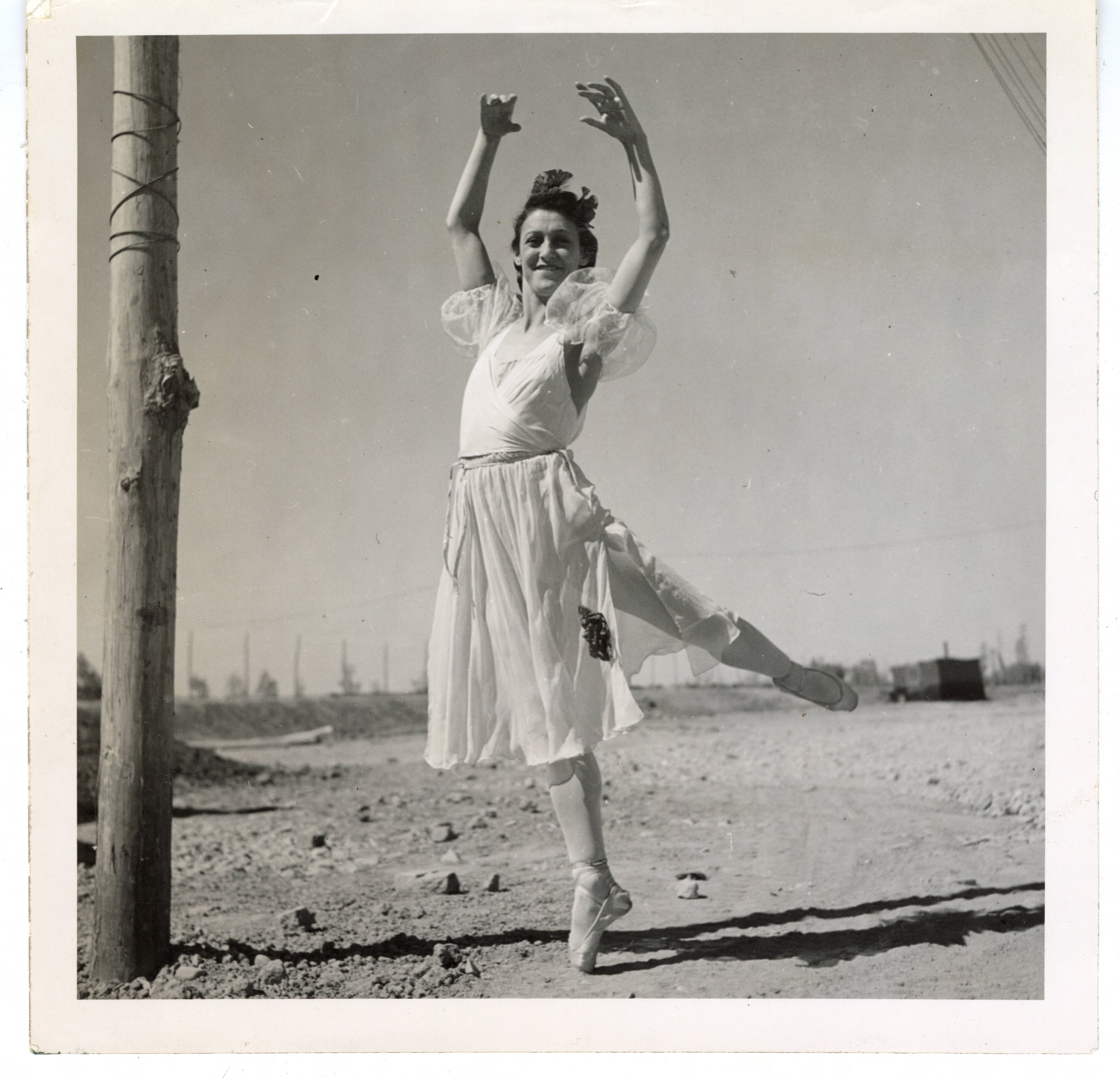
Messerer dancing, 1940s

Sulamith Mikhailovna Messerer, OBE (Russian: Сулами́фь Миха́йловна Мессере́р, 27 August 1908 – 3 June 2004) was a Russian ballerina and choreographer who laid the foundations for the classical ballet in Japan.

== Biography ==
Sulamith Messerer was born into the Lithuanian Jewish family of dentist Mikhail Messerer and his wife Sima Shabad, and was one of nine children. Every child was given a biblical name: Pnina, Azariah, Mattany, Rachel, Asaf (or Assaf), Elisheva, Sulamith (or Shulamith), Emanuel, Abinadab and Erella.

Sulamith Messerer, her brother Azary Azarin (an actor), sister Rachel Messerer and brother Asaf Messerer (ballet dancer, choreographer) became famous and started a dynasty of outstanding ballet dancers and ballet masters.

Sulamith studied from the age of 8 in the Moscow Ballet School under Vasily Tikhomirov and Elisabeth Gerdt and danced in the Bolshoi Theatre from 1926 until 1950. In 1929, she was promoted to prima ballerina of the Bolshoï ballet and kept this position for 25 years. In 1933, she and her brother Asaf Messerer became the first Soviet dancers to tour Western Europe. She also practised swimming all her life and held the Soviet swimming record for the 100-metres crawl between 1927 and 1930.

After her sister Rachel Messerer-Plisetskaya was arrested in the Great Purge, Sulamith legally adopted Rachel's daughter Maya Plisetskaya, whom she coached into one of the greatest ballerinas ever. From 1950 until 1980, she was also active as a ballet mistress and teacher in the Bolshoi. Her brother took care of their nephew and Maya's younger brother Alexander Plisetski. Since 1961, she spent much time in Tokyo, where she mastered Japanese and was instrumental in establishing the Tokyo Ballet. She was also the aunt of theater artist Boris Messerer through her brother Asaf.

In 1978 and 1979, she taught numerous students at Ankara State Conservatory (now part of Hacettepe University) in Turkey. Her influence shaped the lives of many Turkish dancers.

In 1980, at the age of 72, she defected to Great Britain, where she continued to work as a much sought-after coach. Her many honours included the Stalin Prize (1946), the People's Artist of the RSFSR (1962), the Order of the Sacred Treasures (1996). She is the first Russian to be awarded the Order of the British Empire (2000).

== See also ==
- List of Russian ballet dancers
- List of Eastern Bloc defectors
