= Russian language in Israel =

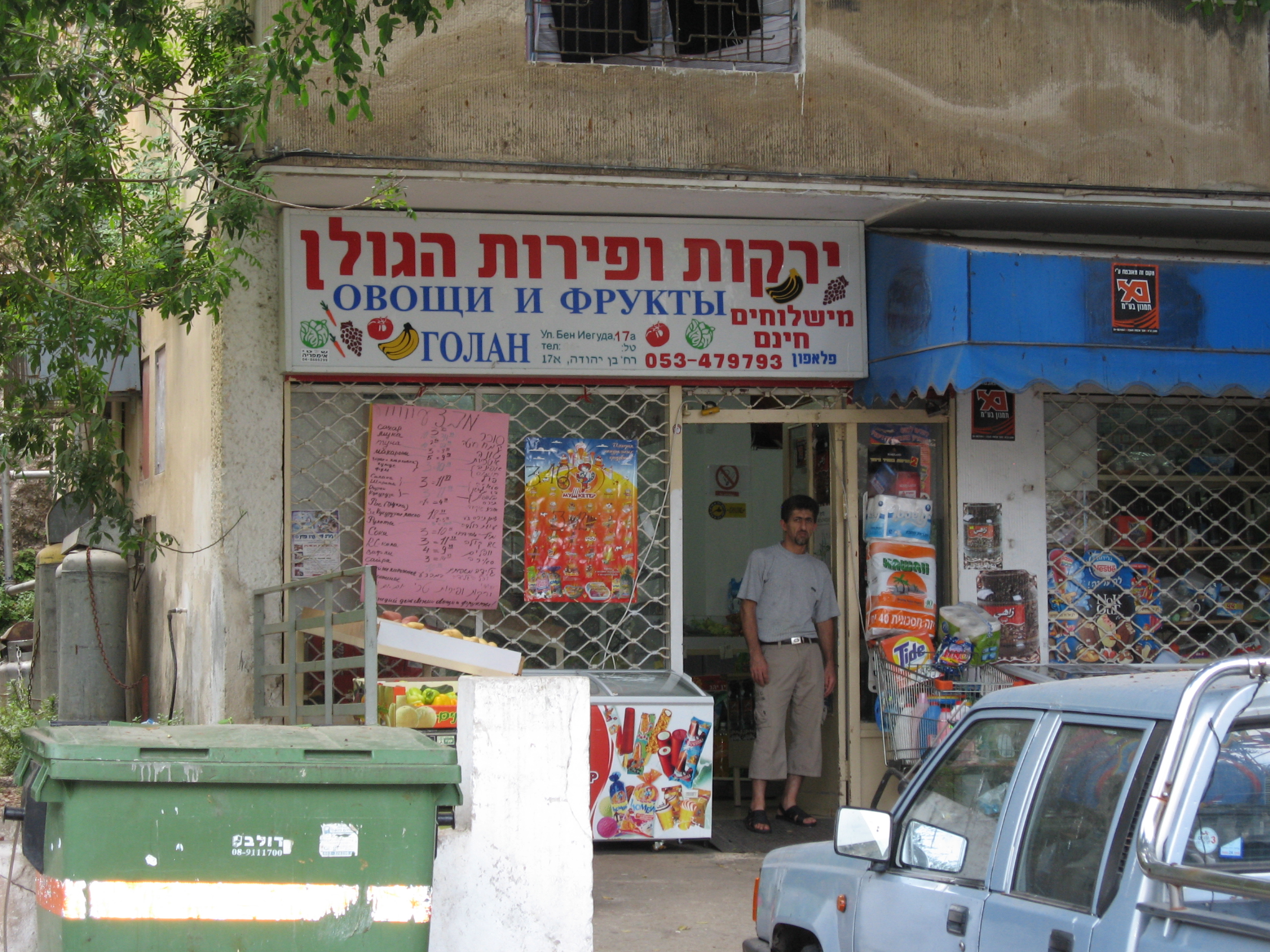
"Vegetables and fruits" shop sign in Haifa in Russian and Hebrew.

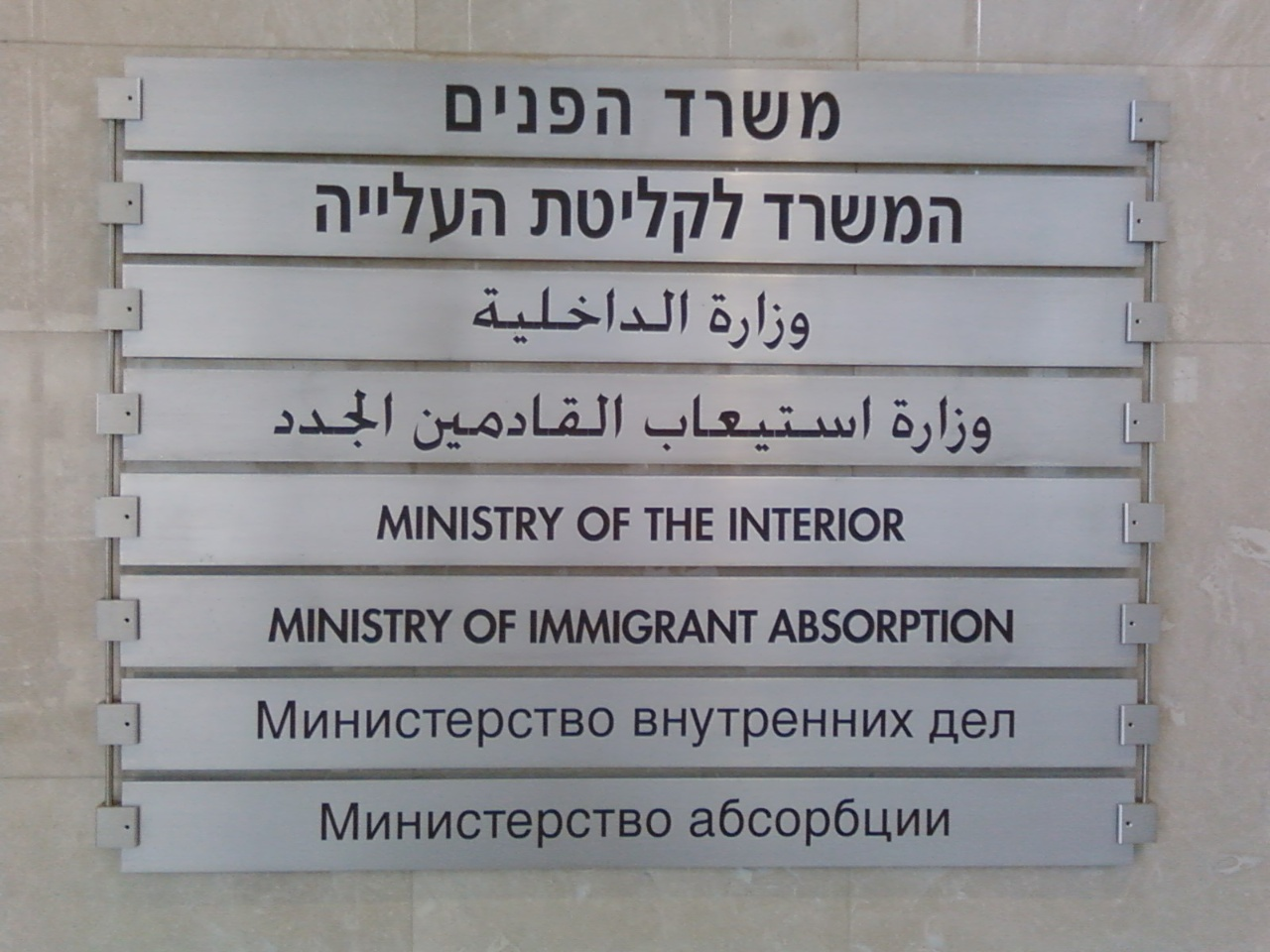
A multilingual (Hebrew, Arabic, English, and Russian) sign at the Ministry of Interior/Ministry of Immigrant Absorption in Haifa.

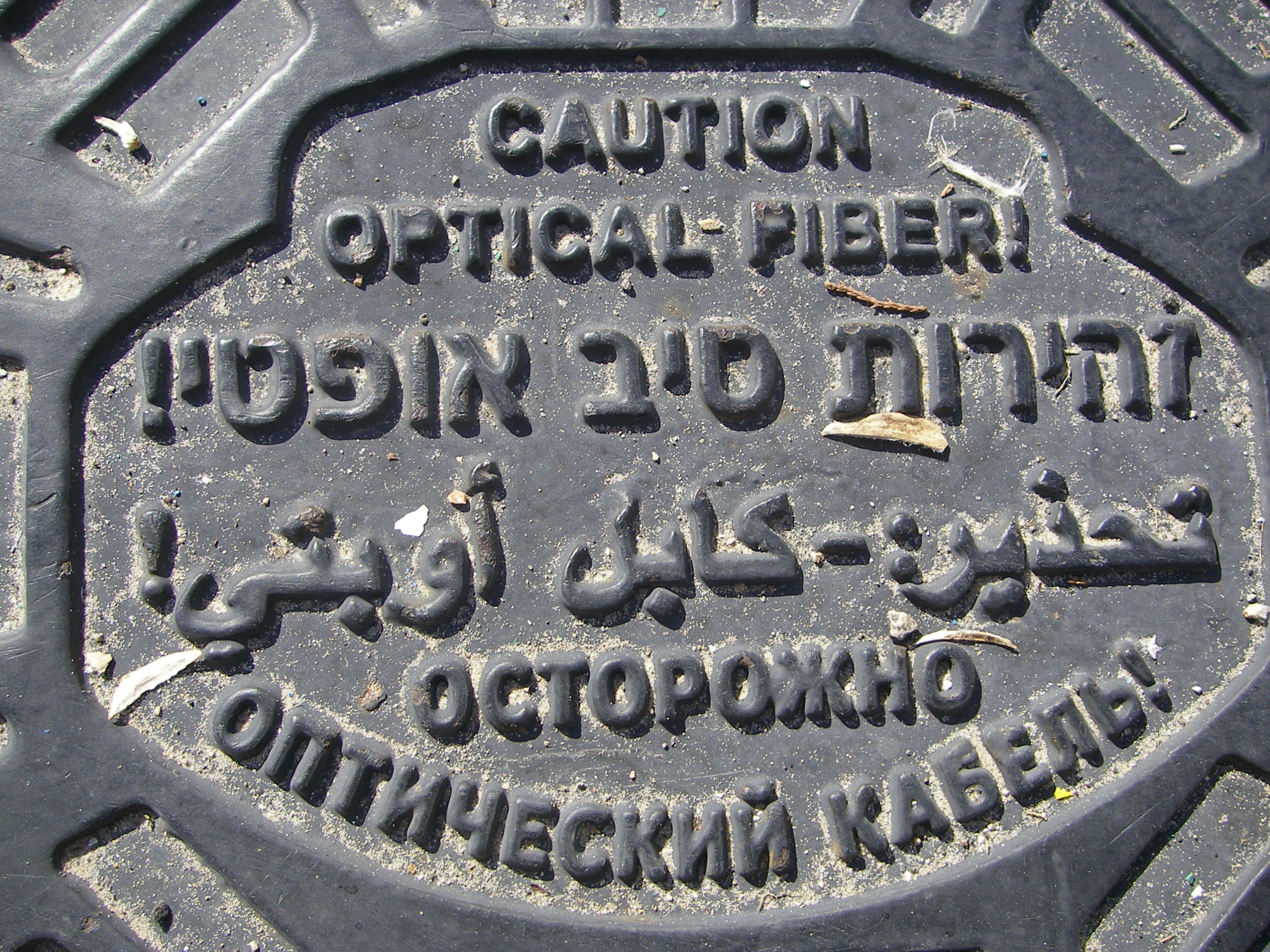
The multilingual warning (English, Hebrew, Arabic and Russian) on the optical cable manhole cover in Tel Aviv.

The Russian language is spoken natively by a considerable proportion of the population of Israel, mostly by immigrants who came from the former Soviet Union from 1989 onwards. It is a major foreign language in the country, and is used in many aspects of life. Russian is the third most common native language in Israel after Modern Hebrew and Arabic. Government institutions and businesses often also provide information and services in Russian, and Russian has effectively become semi-official in areas with a high concentration of Russian-speaking immigrants. The Russian-speaking population of Israel is the world's third-largest population of Russian native speakers living outside the former Soviet Union territories after Germany and the United States, and the highest as a proportion of the population.

== History ==
About 100,000 Jews emigrated from the Soviet Union to Israel from 1971 to 1974. Most of them were from Georgia; the Baltic states of Estonia, Latvia, and Lithuania; and areas annexed by the Red Army in 1939–1940 from Poland and Romania. Soviet authorities allowed this emigration by calling it "family reunification," to avoid the appearance that anyone was unhappy living in the Soviet state. These emigrants held strongly Zionist views and took the opportunity to settle in their historic homeland. Less than half of those who emigrated in the 1970s wave came from Slavic countries, i. e., Russia, Ukraine, Belarus, Poland even though about 80% of Soviet Jews lived there at the time.

It was not until Perestroika that Jewish activists were given freedom to operate. The emigration that took place from 1989 to 1993 is described as a "panic migration", due to the socio-economic crisis in the Soviet states, rather than a migration of "born-again" Jews. Many of them did not have any relation to Judaism or Zionism in their former place of residence. Most immigrants of this period came from Russia and Ukraine, and to a lesser extent from Belarus and Central Asia.

The "old immigrants" of the 1970s, who mainly came to Israel for Zionist feelings, viewed people who came during the wave of the 1980s and 1990s as people escaping a harsh economic situation who did not have much appreciation for their new homeland. The last Soviet census of 1989 indicated 1,449,000 Jews living in the country, of which about 877,000 had moved to Israel by October 2000. The wave of immigration in this short period of time was the greatest influx of people to Israel since the date of its creation. Immigrants from the former Soviet Union composed 50%–70% of the newcomers. The number of people who came to Israel in the late 1980s and early 1990s outnumbered the number of people who came during the 1970s by four times, which made it harder for them to be integrated into the mainstream society of such a small country.

== Demography ==
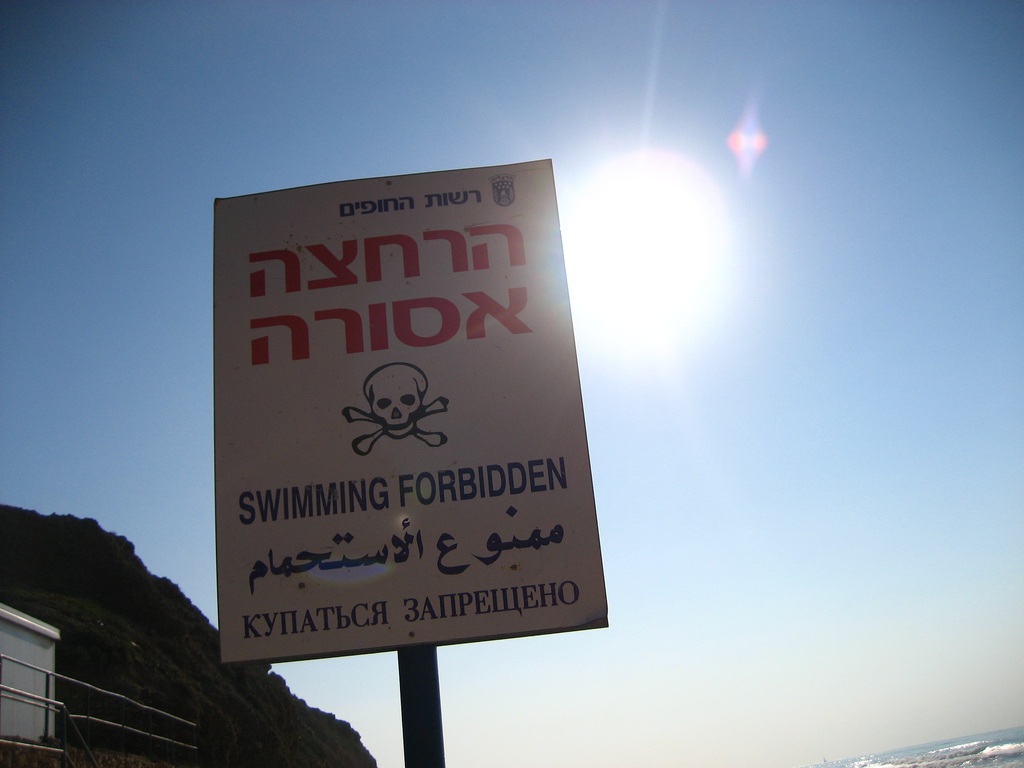
A multilingual sign at the beach, forbidding swimming

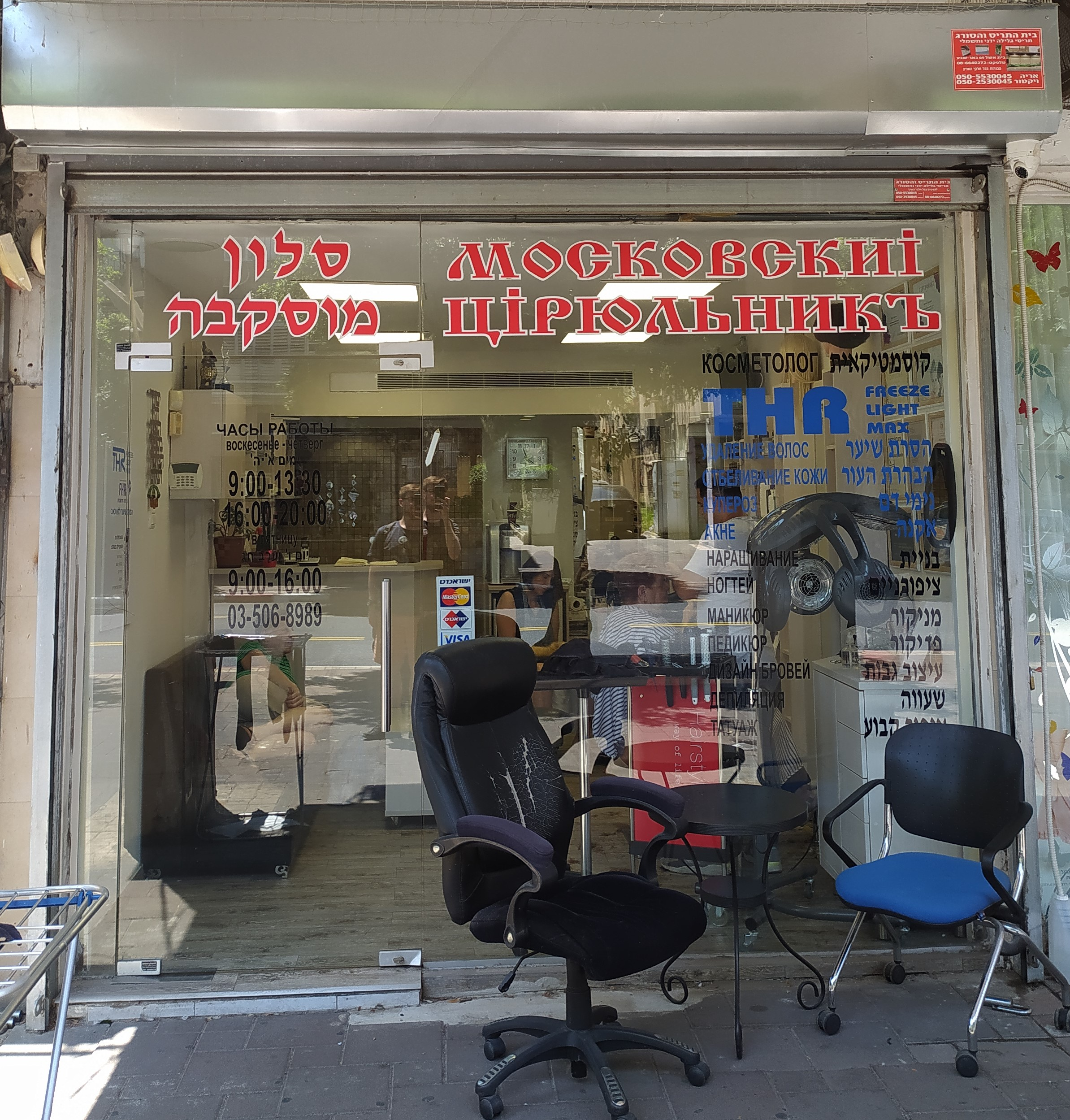
A hairdressing salon in Bat Yam with services whose descriptions are in the modern Russian language, as well as a brand name in red that is stylized as pseudo-pre-revolutionary Russian spelling.

In 2013, about 26 percent of Russian immigrants did not speak fluent Hebrew. Russians often settle close to each other, forming Russian-speaking neighborhoods with store window advertisements in Russian and banks with at least a few Russian-speaking workers. Ashdod, the sixth-largest city in Israel, absorbed a particularly large number of immigrants, accepting over 100,000 Soviet Jews from 1990 to 2001. The Yud-Yud Gimmel neighborhoods in southern Ashdod, where immigrants account for 75 percent of the population of 26,000, were dubbed "Israel's Russian ghetto".

As of 2013, 1,231,003 residents of the Post-Soviet states have immigrated to Israel since the fall of the Soviet Union. As of 2017, there are up to 1.5 million Russian-speaking Israelis out of total population of 8,700,000 (17.25%). As of 2022, approximately 15% of the Israeli population is Russian-speaking, and the Russian-speaking community accounts for 15 percent of Israel's eligible voters.

== Status and usage ==
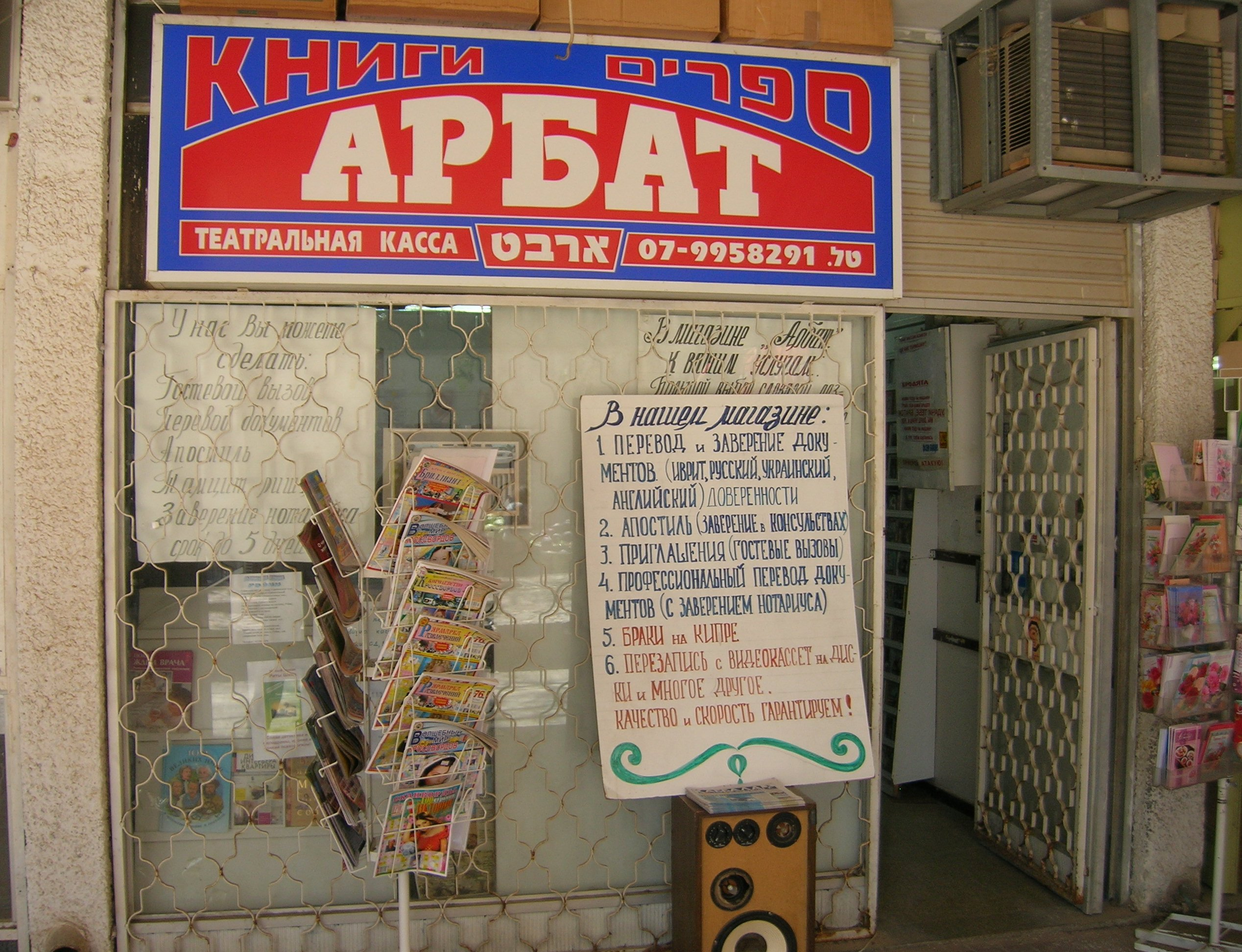
A Russian bookstore in Arad which also offers translation services.

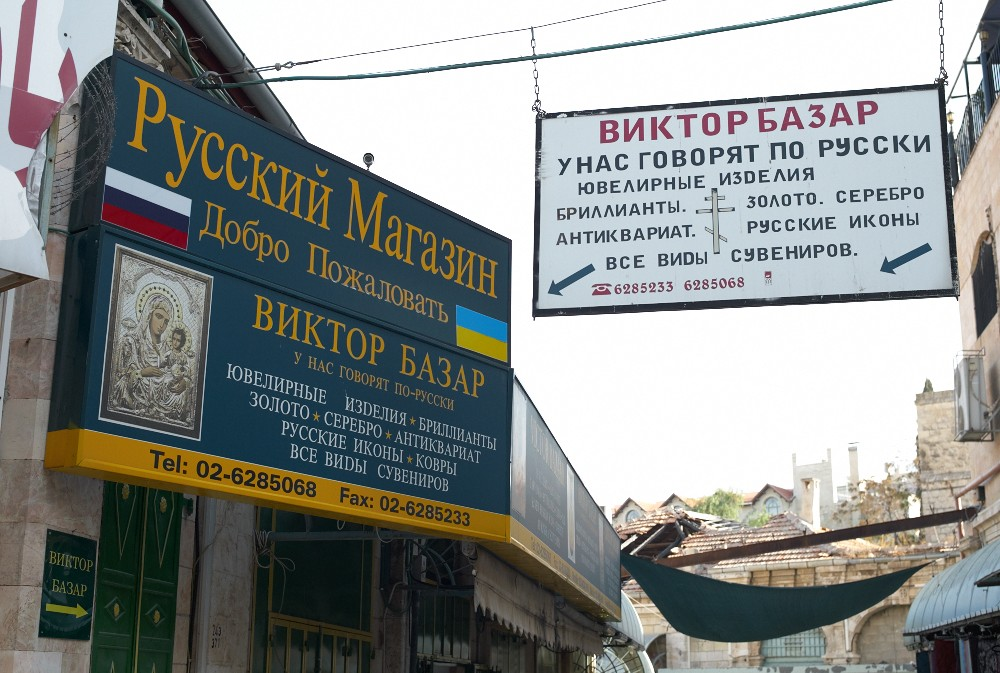
The name "Russian store" ("russki" means Russian, Rus' or Ruthenian) in Jerusalem with texts in the Russian language decorated with the flags of Russia and Ukraine

Hebrew is the only official language of the State of Israel, while Arabic has special status. (Note: Arabic has a "special status" as set by the Basic Law of 2018, which allows it to be used by official institutions. Prior to that law's passage, Arabic had been an official language alongside Hebrew.)

Russian and a number of other immigrant languages are widely used in Israel, because ethnic Jews from dozens of countries from all around the world have settled in the area. Russian is the major immigrant language of Jews living in Israel. Since 1967, millions of Russian Jews have settled in the country, and a great influx of Jews from the post-Soviet states took place in the 1990s. Today, Russian is used in cultural events, the educational system, and other public domains. Russian-language publishing in Israel has also included works on Jewish themes, for example those issued by Gesharim publishers run by Mikhail Grinberg. There are a number of authors who write in Russian, including Russian literary awards winners such as Dina Rubina or Alexander Goldstein. By 1999, about 5 to 10 percent of all jobs in Israel were held by Russian speakers. The Ministry of Transport published booklets and manuals in Russian. It is very likely to find Russian-speaking doctors at hospitals.

A significant portion of Russian-speaking adults prefer to not learn Hebrew and are reluctant to give up their Russian cultural background. Language professors Elana Shohamy and Bernard Spolsky attributed this to a "strong loyalty to their ethnic language". Hayim Gordon, describing the situation in his 2007 book Israel Today, wrote that Russian immigrants continued to consume media in Russian language, including one of the seven Russian-language newspapers and watched the private Russian TV station. "Even after living years in Israel, hundreds of thousands of these Russian-speakers cannot carry on telephone conversation in Hebrew; many thousands of them cannot ask for directions in Hebrew. Despite these inconveniences, many Russian-speaker continue to reject the Hebrew language wherever and whenever they can."

The Russian-speaking adult population, which is less competitive in Hebrew than the youth, mostly tries to preserve the common Russian cultural background, teaching it to their children born in Israel. However, according to Shohamy and Spolsky, second generation Israelis of Russian origin "do not receive a formal education in Russian" and, as a result, "language attrition is rapid". Political scientist Ze'ev Khanin opined, "The Russian-speaking community is identifiable, but it is part of the Israeli collective. The second generation is much more influenced by its Israeli experience than its Soviet past." In 2001, camp counselors in Ashdod volunteered to help youths accommodate to Israeli lifestyle, and those that participated in the program said that "they feel Israeli in every respect".

== Education ==
Most Jewish immigrants from the Soviet Union were highly educated, with almost 45 percent of them having a college degree.

Although Russian is the native language of a significant part of the country's population, it occupies a modest role in Israel's education system. Hebrew University started teaching Russian in 1962. In public schools, the first Russian-language classes were opened in the 1970s in large cities. The number of students enrolled in these programs dropped in the 1980s as immigration from the Soviet Union slowed down. In the 1990s, a Russian-language program carried out by local governments called Na'leh 16 included some 1,500 students. In 1997, about 120 schools in Israel taught Russian in one way or another.

== Media ==
Traditionally, Russian speakers read newspapers and listen to radio more often than Hebrew speakers.

Nasha strana was the major Russian-newspaper in Israel during the 1970s, when it competed with Tribuna for the immigrant reader. In 1989, there was only one daily in Russian, and six in 1996. In the 2000s, the number of Russian-language newspapers started to decline due to the increasing influence of television and online media. Israeli television provides daily translation in Hebrew, Arabic, and Russian. In 2002, the Israeli Russian-speaking commercial Channel 9 was launched. It is also known as Israel Plus. In November 2007, a typical digital package included 45 channels in foreign languages, with five in Russian. As of 2004, there were four dailies, 11 weeklies, five monthlies, and over 50 local newspapers published in Russian in Israel, with a total circulation of about 250,000 during weekends. Daily radio services in Russian are also available throughout Israel.

In 2006 Ynet estimated that about half a million Russian-speaking Israelis regularly visited Russian-language sites - news portals, forums and leisure sites. After the newspaper Vesti closed in 2018, its web portal kept working, along with several other Russian-language news portals, such as Cursorinfo, NEWSru.co.il, Mignews, Isra.com, Zahav.ru, Detaly and Orbita.co.il.

== See also ==
- Languages of Israel
- Aliyah from the Soviet Union and post-Soviet states
