= Rubaiyat of Omar Khayyam =

1859 translations by Edward FitzGerald

Rubáiyát of Omar Khayyám, the Astronomer-Poet of Persia. Rendered into English Verse
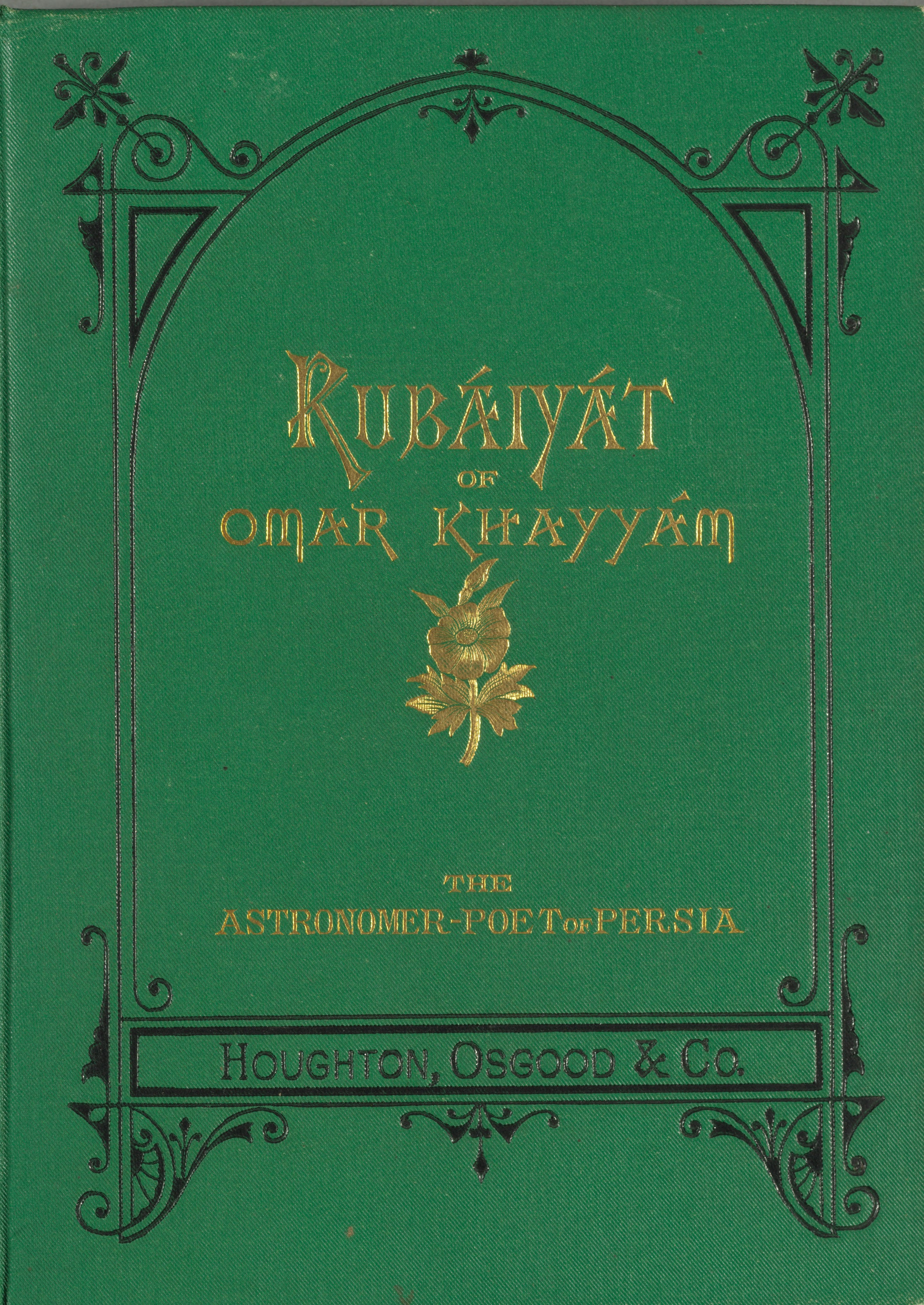
- Front cover of the first American edition (1878)
- Author: Omar Khayyam
- Translator: Edward FitzGerald
- Genre: Poetry
- Publisher: Bernard Quaritch
- Publication date: 1859
- Text: Rubáiyát of Omar Khayyám, the Astronomer-Poet of Persia. Rendered into English Verse at Wikisource

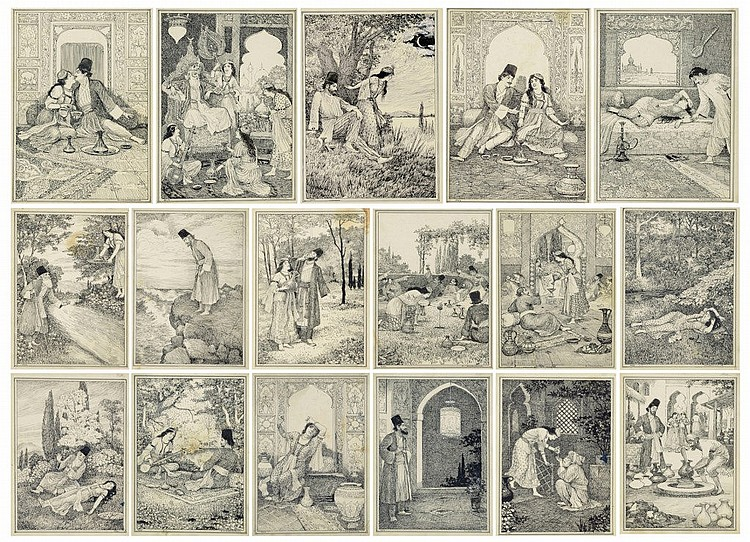
A collection of postcards with paintings of the Rubaiyat of Omar Khayyam, by Indian artist M. V. Dhurandhar

The Rubáiyát of Omar Khayyám is an 1859 translation from Persian to English by Edward FitzGerald of a selection of quatrains (rubāʿiyāt) attributed to Omar Khayyam (1048–1131), dubbed "the Astronomer-Poet of Persia".

Although commercially unsuccessful at first, FitzGerald's work was popularised from 1861 onward by Whitley Stokes, and the work came to be greatly admired by the Pre-Raphaelites in England. FitzGerald had a third edition printed in 1872, which increased interest in the work in the United States. By the 1880s, the book was extremely popular throughout the English-speaking world, to the extent that numerous "Omar Khayyam clubs" were formed and there was a "fin de siècle cult of the Rubaiyat".

FitzGerald's work has been published in several hundred editions and has inspired similar translation efforts in English, Hindi and many other languages.

== Sources ==
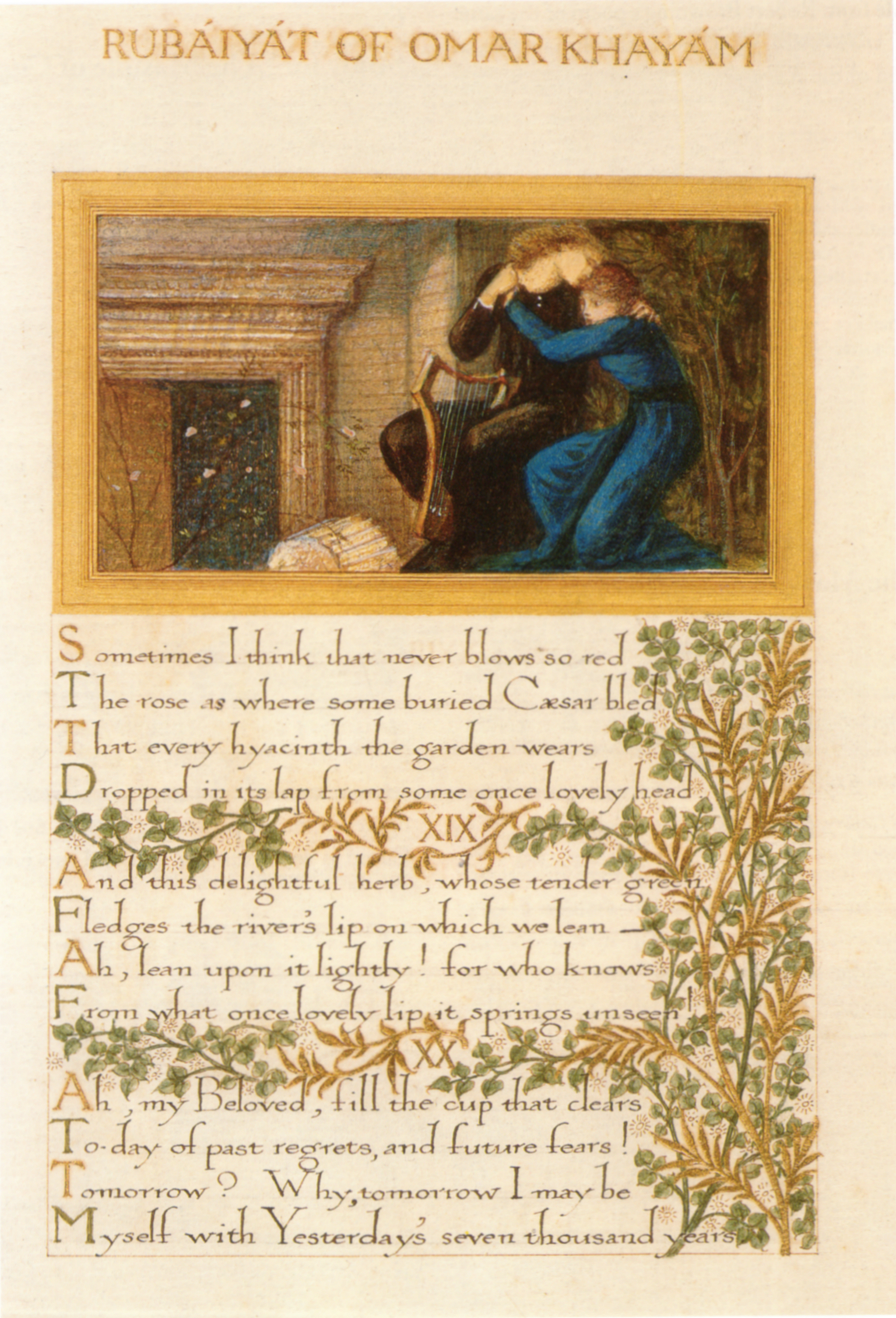
Calligraphic manuscript page with three of FitzGerald's Rubaiyat written by William Morris, illustration by Edward Burne-Jones (1870s).

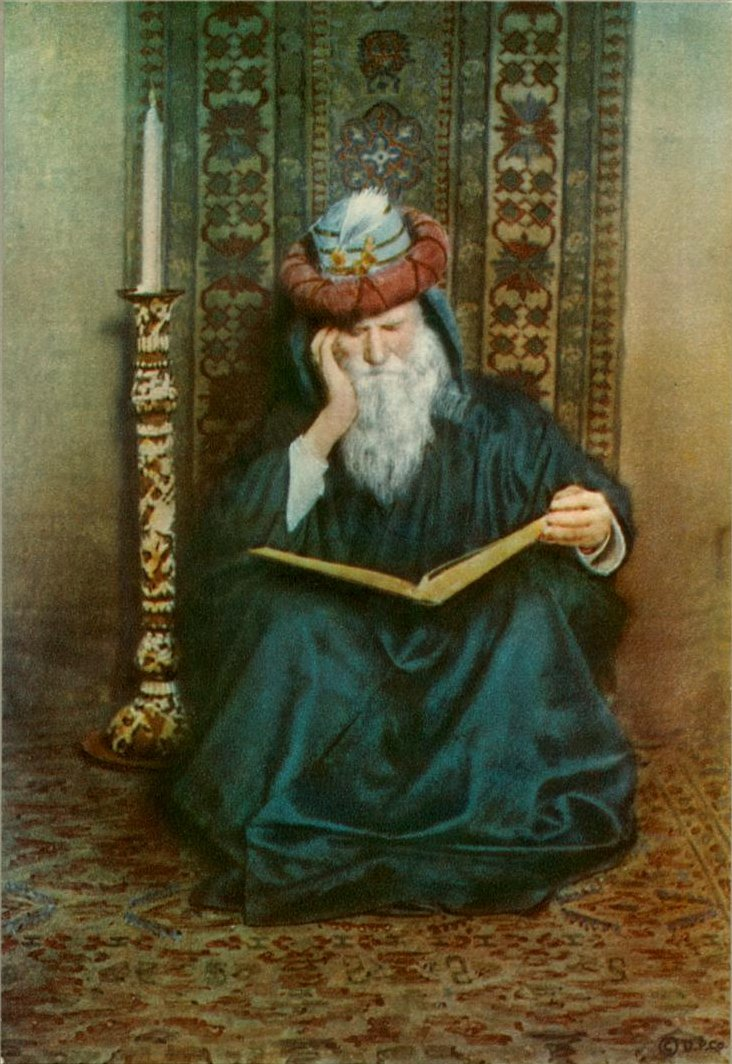
Illustration by Adelaide Hanscom (c. 1910).

FitzGerald's first source was the Bodleian MS, a transcript of which was given to him in 1856 by his friend Edward B. Cowell, with 158 quatrains. His second source was a transcript of an MS Cowell found in 1857 in the library of the Royal Asiatic Society of Bengal in Calcutta.

FitzGerald completed his first draft in 1857 and sent it to Fraser's Magazine in January 1858. He made a revised draft in January 1859, of which he privately printed 250 copies. This first edition became extremely sought after by the 1890s, when "more than two million copies ha[d] been sold in two hundred editions".

A. J. Arberry in his Romance of the Rubaiyat (London: Allen and Unwin, 1959), gave the Persian sources for each of the 75 quatrains FitzGerald translated in his first edition. He showed that some 40 were loose translations of a single stanza in either the Bodleian or Calcutta manuscripts, while others were "mashed together" from two quatrains.

Juan Cole is expanding on Arberry's findings in a series of blog entries that also explain the Persian concepts and personalities found in the poetry: "FitzGerald’s Rubáiyát of Omar Khayyám: Commentary by Juan Cole with Original Persian"

The authenticity of the poetry attributed to Omar Khayyam is highly uncertain. Khayyam was famous during his lifetime not as a poet but as an astronomer and mathematician. The earliest reference to his having written poetry is found in his biography by al-Isfahani, written 43 years after his death. This view is reinforced by other medieval historians such as Shahrazuri (1201) and Al-Qifti (1255). Parts of the Rubaiyat appear as incidental quotations from Omar in early works of biography and in anthologies. These include works of Razi (ca. 1160–1210), Daya (1230), Juvayni (ca. 1226–1283), and Jajarmi (1340). Also, five quatrains assigned to Khayyam in somewhat later sources appear in Zahiri Samarqandi's Sindbad-Nameh (before 1160) without attribution.

The number of quatrains attributed to him in more recent collections varies from about 1,200 (according to Saeed Nafisi) to more than 2,000. Sceptical scholars point out that the entire tradition may be pseudepigraphic. The extant manuscripts containing collections attributed to Omar are dated much too late to enable a reconstruction of a body of authentic verses.

In the 1930s, Iranian scholars, notably Mohammad-Ali Foroughi, attempted to reconstruct a core of authentic verses from scattered quotes by authors of the 13th and 14th centuries, ignoring the younger manuscript tradition. After World War II, reconstruction efforts were significantly delayed by two clever forgeries. De Blois (2004) is pessimistic, suggesting that contemporary scholarship has not advanced beyond the situation of the 1930s, when Hans Heinrich Schaeder commented that the name of Omar Khayyam "is to be struck out from the history of Persian literature".

A feature of the more recent collections is the lack of linguistic homogeneity and continuity of ideas. Sadegh Hedayat commented that "if a man had lived for a hundred years and had changed his religion, philosophy, and beliefs twice a day, he could scarcely have given expression to such a range of ideas". Hedayat's final verdict was that 14 quatrains could be attributed to Khayyam with certainty. Various tests have been employed to reduce the quatrains attributable to Omar to about 100. Arthur Christensen states that "of more than 1,200 ruba'is known to be ascribed to Omar, only 121 could be regarded as reasonably authentic". Foroughi accepts 178 quatrains as authentic, while Ali Dashti accepts 36 of them.

== Scepticism vs. Sufism debate ==
The extreme popularity of FitzGerald's work led to a prolonged debate on the correct interpretation of the philosophy behind the poems. FitzGerald emphasized the religious scepticism he found in Omar Khayyam. In his preface to the Rubáiyát, he describes Omar's philosophy as Epicurean and claims that Omar was "hated and dreaded by the Sufis, whose practice he ridiculed and whose faith amounts to little more than his own when stripped of the Mysticism and formal recognition of Islamism under which Omar would not hide". Richard Nelson Frye also emphasizes that Khayyam was despised by a number of prominent contemporary Sufis. These include figures such as Shams Tabrizi, Najm al-Din Daya, Al-Ghazali, and Attar, who "viewed Khayyam not as a fellow-mystic, but a free-thinking scientist". The sceptical interpretation is supported by the medieval historian Al-Qifti (c. 1172–1248), who in The History of Learned Men reports that Omar's poems were only outwardly in the Sufi style but were written with an anti-religious agenda. He also mentions that Khayyam was indicted for impiety and went on a pilgrimage to avoid punishment.

Critics of FitzGerald, on the other hand, have accused the translator of misrepresenting the mysticism of Sufi poetry by an overly literal interpretation. Thus, the view of Omar Khayyam as a Sufi was defended by Bjerregaard (1915). Dougan (1991) likewise says that attributing hedonism to Omar is due to the failings of FitzGerald's translation, arguing that the poetry is to be understood as "deeply esoteric". Idries Shah (1999) similarly says that FitzGerald misunderstood Omar's poetry.

The Sufi interpretation is the view of a minority of scholars. Henry Beveridge states that "the Sufis have unaccountably pressed this writer [Khayyam] into their service; they explain away some of his blasphemies by forced interpretations, and others they represent as innocent freedoms and reproaches". Aminrazavi (2007) states that "Sufi interpretation of Khayyam is possible only by reading into his Rubaiyat extensively and by stretching the content to fit the classical Sufi doctrine".

Modern scholars still defend FitzGerald's "scepticist" reading of the poetry. Sadegh Hedayat (The Blind Owl, 1936) was the most notable modern proponent of Khayyam's philosophy as agnostic scepticism. In his introductory essay to his second edition of the Quatrains of the Philosopher Omar Khayyam (1922), Hedayat states that "while Khayyam believes in the transmutation and transformation of the human body, he does not believe in a separate soul; if we are lucky, our bodily particles would be used in the making of a jug of wine". He concludes that "religion has proved incapable of surmounting his inherent fears; thus Khayyam finds himself alone and insecure in a universe about which his knowledge is nil". In his later work (Khayyam's Quatrains, 1935), Hedayat further maintains that Khayyam's usage of Sufic terminology such as "wine" is literal, and that "Khayyam took refuge in wine to ward off bitterness and to blunt the cutting edge of his thoughts."

== Editions ==
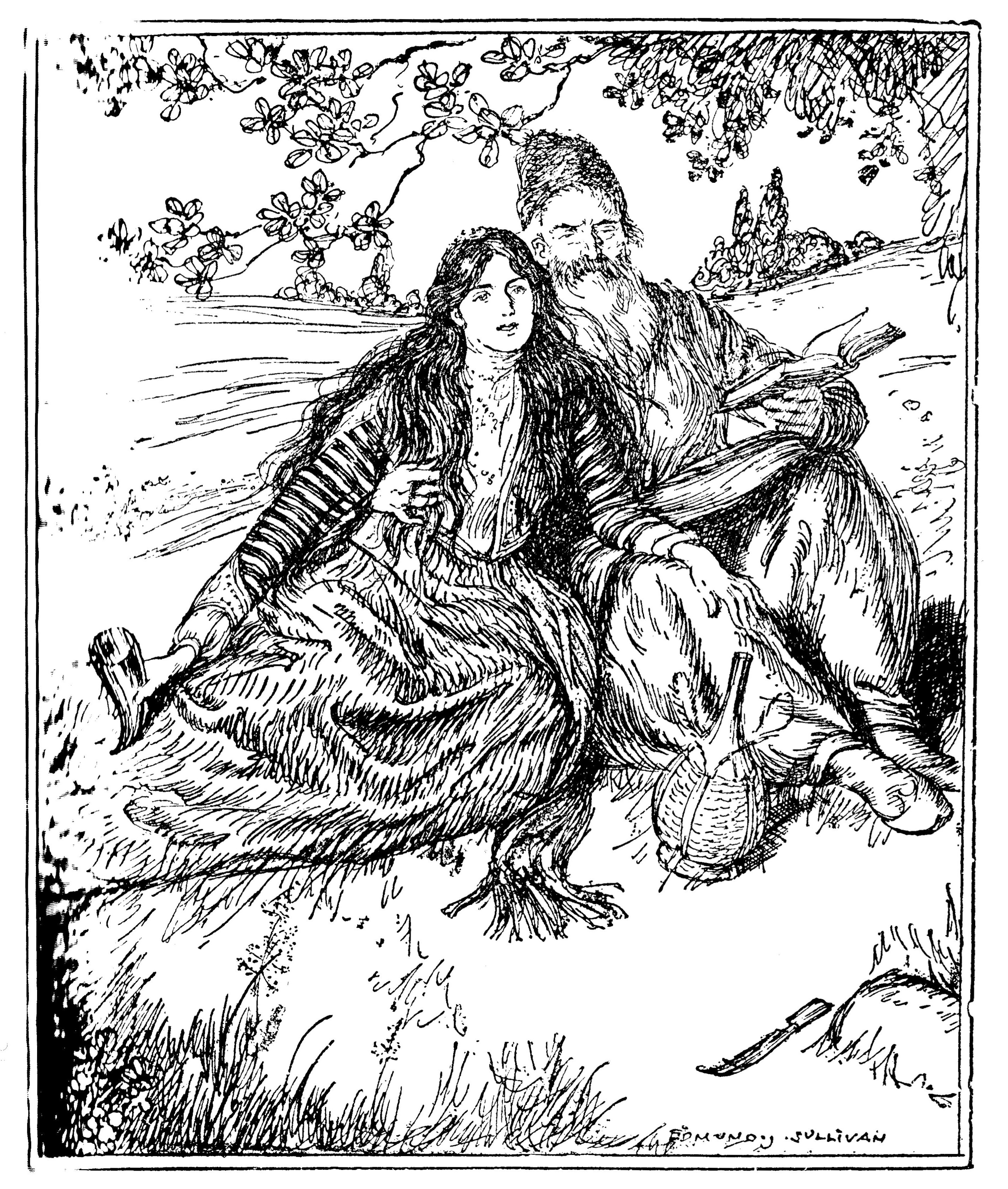
Illustration by Edmund Joseph Sullivan for Quatrain 11 of FitzGerald's First Version.

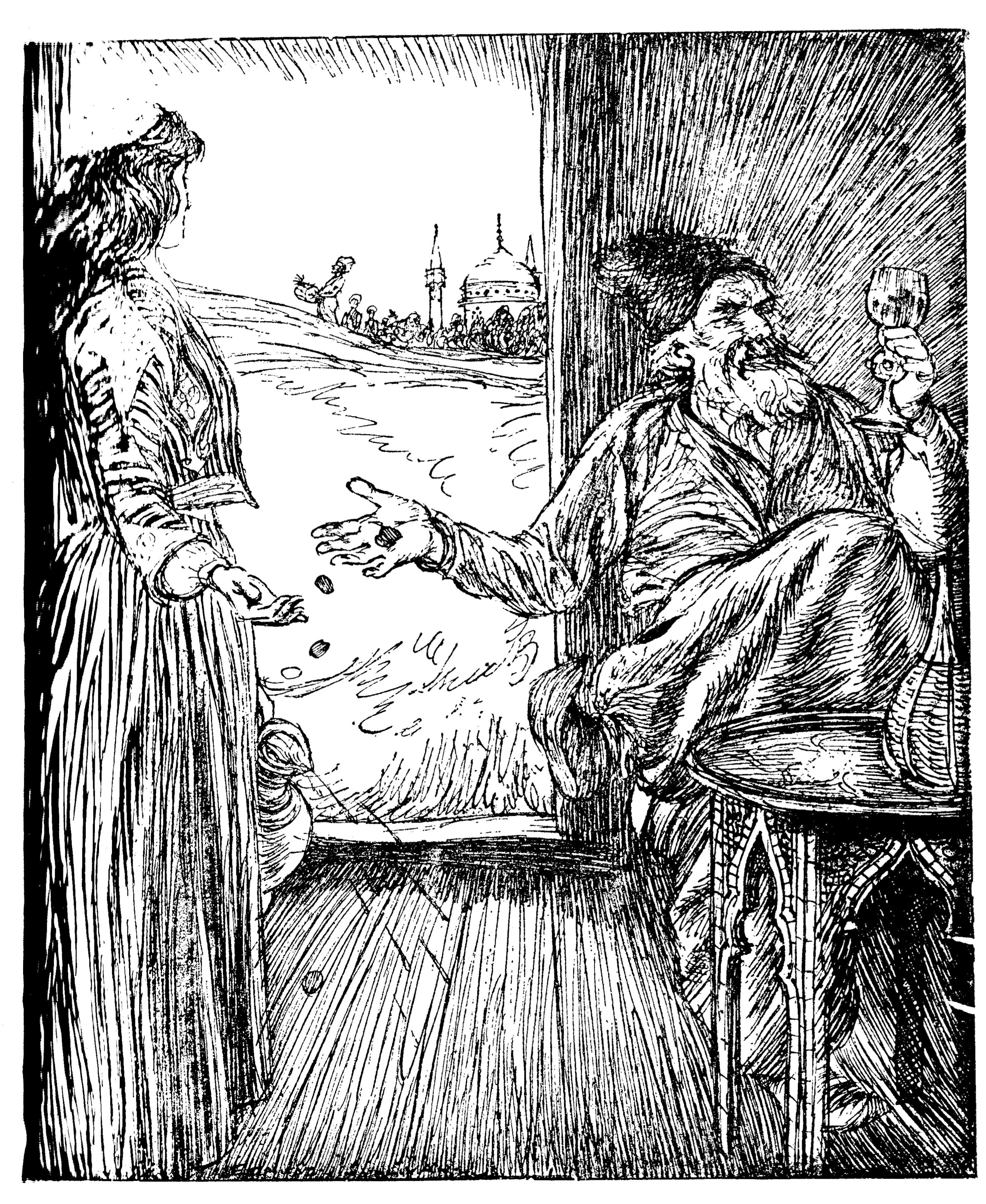
Illustration by Edmund Joseph Sullivan for Quatrain 12 of FitzGerald's First Version.

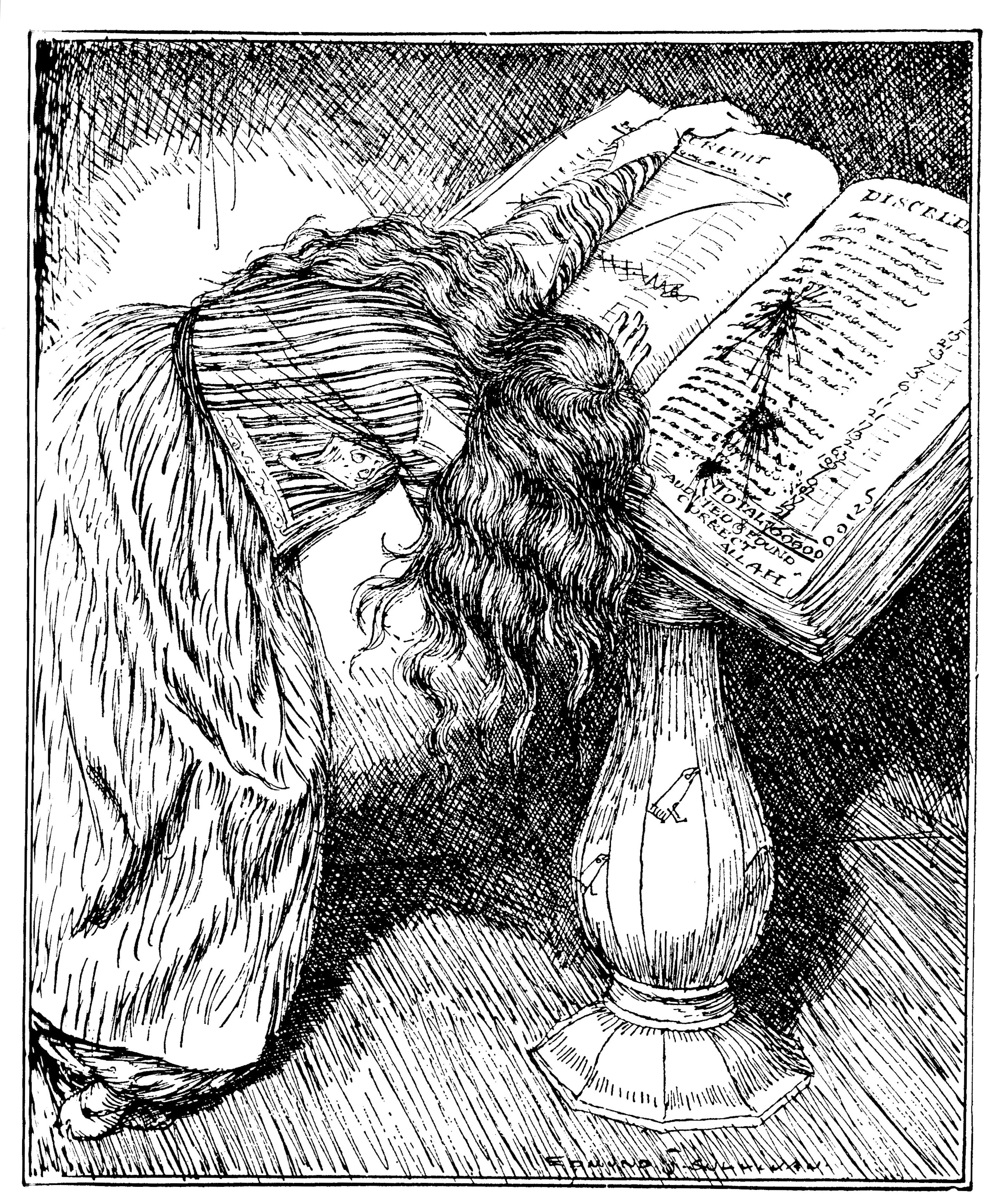
Illustration by Edmund Joseph Sullivan for Quatrain 51 of FitzGerald's First Version.

FitzGerald's text was published in five editions, with substantial revisions:

- 1st edition – 1859 [75 quatrains]
- 2nd edition – 1868 [110 quatrains]
- 3rd edition – 1872 [101 quatrains]
  - 1878, "first American edition", reprint of the 3rd ed.
- 4th edition – 1879 [101 quatrains]
- 5th edition – 1889 [101 quatrains]

Of the five editions published, four were published under the authorial control of FitzGerald. The fifth edition, which contained only minor changes from the fourth, was edited posthumously on the basis of manuscript revisions FitzGerald had left.

Numerous later editions were published after 1889, notably an edition with illustrations by Willy Pogany first published in 1909 (George G. Harrap, London). It was issued in numerous revised editions. This edition combined FitzGerald's texts of the 1st and 4th editions and was subtitled "The First and Fourth Renderings in English Verse".

A bibliography of editions compiled in 1929 listed more than 300 separate editions. Many more have been published since.

Notable editions of the late 19th and early 20th centuries include: Houghton, Mifflin & Co. (1887, 1888, 1894); Doxey, At the Sign of the Lark (1898, 1900), illustrations by Florence Lundborg; The Macmillan Company (1899); Methuen (1900) with a commentary by H.M. Batson, and a biographical introduction by E.D. Ross; Little, Brown, and Company (1900), with the versions of E.H. Whinfield and Justin Huntly McCart; Bell (1901); Routledge (1904); Foulis (1905, 1909); Essex House Press (1905); Dodge Publishing Company (1905); Duckworth & Co. (1908); Hodder and Stoughton (1909), illustrations by Edmund Dulac; Tauchnitz (1910); East Anglian Daily Times (1909), Centenary celebrations souvenir; Warner (1913); The Roycrofters (1913); Hodder & Stoughton (1913), illustrations by René Bull; Dodge Publishing Company (1914), illustrations by Adelaide Hanscom. Sully and Kleinteich (1920).

Critical editions have been published by Decker (1997) and by Arberry (2016).

== Character of translation ==
FitzGerald's translation is rhyming and metrical, and rather free. Many of the verses are paraphrased, and some of them cannot be confidently traced to his source material at all. Michael Kearney claimed that FitzGerald described his work as "tesselation". To a large extent, the Rubaiyat can be considered original poetry by FitzGerald loosely based on Omar's quatrains rather than a "translation" in the narrow sense.

FitzGerald was open about the liberties he had taken with his source material:

My translation will interest you from its form, and also in many respects in its detail: very un-literal as it is. Many quatrains are mashed together: and something lost, I doubt, of Omar's simplicity, which is so much a virtue in him. (letter to E. B. Cowell, 9/3/58)

I suppose very few people have ever taken such Pains in Translation as I have: though certainly not to be literal. But at all Costs, a Thing must live: with a transfusion of one's own worse Life if one can't retain the Originals better. Better a live Sparrow than a stuffed Eagle. (letter to E. B. Cowell, 4/27/59)

For comparison, here are two versions of the same quatrain by FitzGerald, from the 1859 and 1889 editions:

Quatrain XI (1859)

Herewith a Loaf of Bread beneath the Bough,
A Flask of Wine, a Book of Verse—and Thou
Beside me singing in the Wilderness—
And Wilderness is Paradise enow.

Quatrain XII (1889)

A Book of Verses underneath the Bough,
A Jug of Wine, a Loaf of Bread—and Thou
Beside me singing in the Wilderness—
Oh, Wilderness were Paradise enow!

This quatrain has a close correspondence in two of the quatrains in the Bodleian Library ms., numbers 149 and 155. In the literal prose translation of Edward Heron-Allen (1898):

No. 149

I desire a little ruby wine and a book of verses,
Just enough to keep me alive, and half a loaf is needful;
And then, that I and thou should sit in a desolate place
Is better than the kingdom of a sultan.

No. 155

If a loaf of wheaten-bread be forthcoming,
a gourd of wine, and a thigh-bone of mutton, and then,
if thou and I be sitting in the wilderness, —
that would be a joy to which no sultan can set bounds.

== Other translations ==
=== English ===
Multilingual edition, published in 1955 by Tahrir Iran Co./Kashani Bros.

Two English editions by Edward Henry Whinfield (1836–1922) consisted of 253 quatrains in 1882 and 500 in 1883. This translation was fully revised and some cases fully translated anew by Ali Salami and published by Mehrandish Books.

Whinfield's translation is, if possible, even more free than FitzGerald's; Quatrain 84 (equivalent of FitzGerald's quatrain XI in his 1st edition, as above) reads:

In the sweet spring a grassy bank I sought
And thither wine and a fair Houri brought;
And, though the people called me graceless dog,
Gave not to Paradise another thought!

John Leslie Garner published an English translation of 152 quatrains in 1888. His was also a free, rhyming translation. Quatrain I. 20 (equivalent of FitzGerald's quatrain XI in his 1st edition, as above):

Yes, Loved One, when the Laughing Spring is blowing,
With Thee beside me and the Cup o’erflowing,
I pass the day upon this Waving Meadow,
And dream the while, no thought on Heaven bestowing.

Justin Huntly McCarthy (1859–1936) (Member of Parliament for Newry) published prose translations of 466 quatrains in 1889. Quatrain 177 (equivalent of FitzGerald's quatrain XI in his 1st edition, as above):

In Spring time I love to sit in the meadow with a paramour
perfect as a Houri and goodly jar of wine, and though
I may be blamed for this, yet hold me lower
than a dog if ever I dream of Paradise.

Richard Le Gallienne (1866–1947) produced a paraphrase in 1897. Le Gallienne knew no Persian and based his paraphrase on earlier translations, exaggerating earlier translators' choices to make Khayyam appear more irreligious. For instance, he invents a verse in which Khayyam is made to say "the unbeliever knows his Koran best", and rewrites another to describe pious hypocrites as "a maggot-minded, starved, fanatic crew", rather than the original Persian which emphasizes their ignorance of religion. Rather than a symbol for gnostic wisdom, wine becomes a straightforward image of libertinism for La Gallienne. Some example quatrains follow:

Look not above, there is no answer there;
Pray not, for no one listens to your prayer;
Near is as near to God as any Far,
And Here is just the same deceit as There.
(#78, on p. 44)

"Did God set grapes a-growing, do you think,
And at the same time make it sin to drink?
Give thanks to Him who foreordained it thus—
Surely He loves to hear the glasses clink!"
(#91, p. 48)

Edward Heron-Allen (1861–1943) published a prose translation in 1898. He also wrote an introduction to an edition of the translation by Frederick Rolfe (Baron Corvo) into English from Nicolas's French translation. Below is Quatrain 17 translated by E. H. into English:

This worn caravanserai which is called the world
Is the resting-place of the piebald horse of night and day;
It is a pavilion which has been abandoned by a hundred Jamshyds;
It is a palace that is the resting-place of a hundred Bahrams.

The English novelist and orientalist Jessie Cadell (1844–1884) consulted various manuscripts of the Rubaiyat with the intention of producing an authoritative edition. Her translation of 150 quatrains was published posthumously in 1899.

A. J. Arberry in 1949 and 1952 produced translations of two putative thirteenth-century manuscripts acquired shortly before by the Chester Beatty Library and Cambridge University Library. However, it was soon established that, unbeknown to Arberry or the libraries, the manuscripts were recent forgeries. While Arberry's work had been misguided, it was published in good faith.

The 1967 translation of the Rubáiyat by Robert Graves and Omar Ali-Shah created a scandal. The authors claimed it was based on a twelfth-century manuscript located in Afghanistan, where it was allegedly utilized as a Sufi teaching document. But the manuscript was never produced, and British experts in Persian literature were easily able to prove that the translation was in fact based on Edward Heron Allen's analysis of possible sources for FitzGerald's work.

Quatrains 11 and 12 (the equivalent of FitzGerald's quatrain XI in his 1st edition, as above):

Should our day's portion be one mancel loaf,
A haunch of mutton and a gourd of wine
Set for us two alone on the wide plain,
No Sultan's bounty could evoke such joy.

A gourd of red wine and a sheaf of poems —
A bare subsistence, half a loaf, not more —
Supplied us two alone in the free desert:
What Sultan could we envy on his throne?

John Charles Edward Bowen (1909–1989) was a British poet and translator of Persian poetry. He is best known for his translation of the Rubaiyat, titled A New Selection from the Rubaiyat of Omar Khayyam. Bowen is also credited as being one of the first scholars to question Robert Graves' and Omar Ali-Shah's translation of the Rubaiyat.

A modern version of 235 quatrains, claiming to be "as literal an English version of the Persian originals as readability and intelligibility permit", was published in 1979 by Peter Avery and John Heath-Stubbs. Their edition provides two versions of the thematic quatrain, the first (98) considered by the Persian writer Sadeq Hedayat to be a spurious attribution.

98.
I need a jug of wine and a book of poetry,
Half a loaf for a bite to eat,
Then you and I, seated in a deserted spot,
Will have more wealth than a Sultan's realm.

234.
If chance supplied a loaf of white bread,
Two casks of wine and a leg of mutton,
In the corner of a garden with a tulip-cheeked girl,
There'd be enjoyment no Sultan could outdo.

In 1988, the Rubaiyat was translated by an Iranian for the first time. Karim Emami's translation of the Rubaiyat was published under the title The Wine of Nishapour in Paris. The Wine of Nishapour is the collection of Khayyam's poetry by Shahrokh Golestan, including Golestan's pictures in front of each poem. Example quatrain 160 (equivalent to FitzGerald's quatrain XI in his first edition, as above):

In spring if a houri-like sweetheart
Gives me a cup of wine on the edge of a green cornfield,
Though to the vulgar this would be blasphemy,
If I mentioned any other Paradise, I'd be worse than a dog.

In 1991, Ahmad Saidi (1904–1994) produced an English translation of 165 quatrains grouped into 10 themes. Born and raised in Iran, Saidi went to the United States in 1931 and attended college there. He served as the head of the Persian Publication Desk at the U.S. Office of War Information during World War II, inaugurated the Voice of America in Iran, and prepared an English-Persian military dictionary for the Department of Defense. His quatrains include the original Persian verses for reference alongside his English translations. His focus was to faithfully convey, with less poetic license, Khayyam's original religious, mystical, and historic Persian themes, through the verses as well as his extensive annotations. Two example quatrains follow:

Quatrain 16 (equivalent to FitzGerald's quatrain XII in his 5th edition, as above):

Ah, would there were a loaf of bread as fare,
A joint of lamb, a jug of vintage rare,
And you and I in wilderness encamped—
No Sultan's pleasure could with ours compare.

Quatrain 75:

The sphere upon which mortals come and go,
Has no end nor beginning that we know;
And none there is to tell us in plain truth:
Whence do we come and whither do we go.

Wine of the Mystic

Self-Realization Fellowship published a spiritual interpretation, titled "Wine of the Mystic", by Paramahansa Yogananda (1893–1952), of Edward Fitzgerald's first translation of the Rubaiyat of Omar Khayyam, in 1994. This was originally published in serial format in Self-Realization Fellowship's Inner Culture magazine (now known as Self-Realization). The series ran from 1937 to 1944. An expanded version, with additional material that had not been included in the earlier serialization, appeared in Self-Realization magazine from 1971 through 1990. The introduction and foreword provide context about Paramahansa Yogananda's spiritual interpretation, of Omar Khayyam and his life, and of Edward Fitzgerald.

The foreword touches on a comparison of Yoga and Sufi mysticism, drawing references from various sources. It also covers both sides of a controversy around "whether or not Fitzgerald had really conserved the spirit of Omar Khayyam... Indeed, the controversy appeared to revolve not so much around the accuracy of FitzGerald's translation as around whether or not he was correct in his conclusion that Omar was not a Sufi".

Yogananda's interpretation contains a glossary that unveils the spiritual meaning behind the symbology of the rubais, or quatrains, followed by a spiritual interpretation, then practical applications, for each verse.

Towards the end of the introduction to the Wine of the Mystic, Yogananda states:

Omar distinctly states that wine symbolizes the intoxication of divine love and joy. Many of his stanzas are so purely spiritual that hardly any material meanings can be drawn from them, as for instance in quatrains XLIV, LX, and LXVI. With the help of a Persian scholar, I translated the original Rubaiyat into English. But I found that, though literally translated, they lacked the fiery spirit of Khayyam's original. After I compared that translation with FitzGerald's, I realized that FitzGerald had been divinely inspired to catch exactly in gloriously musical English words the soul of Omar's writings...

Yogananda then concludes the introduction with:

As I worked on the spiritual interpretation of the Rubaiyat , it took me into an endless labyrinth of truth, until I was rapturously lost in wonderment. The veiling of Khayyam's metaphysical and practical philosophy in these verses reminds me of "The Revelation of St. John the Divine." The Rubaiyat may rightly be called "The Revelation of Omar Khayyam."

The foreword states: "The Persian text of Khayyam's original appears above each of FitzGerald's quatrains. Since in compiling his translation FitzGerald often combined lines from more than one of Omar's verses (as well as introducing phrases from other sources), the Persian text will not be found to be an exact duplicate of the English. Drawing on the research of several Persian scholars, we have presented the quatrain of Omar's that most closely corresponds to each of FitzGerald's." Following is an example excerpt of Quatrain XLIV from Wine of The Mystic (referred to towards the end of the introduction):

The mighty Mahmud, the victorious Lord,

That all the misbelieving and black Horde

Of Fears and Sorrows that infest the Soul

Scatters and slays with his enchanted Sword

Glossary—Mahmud: Tenth-century warrior king. Victorious lord: The devotee who has conquered sense temptations and is lord and master of his own mind and its inclinations. Misbelieving and black horde: Ignorance, which produces darkness or error in the soul, causing doubt of the existence of God and of the superiority of good over evil ways. Scatters and slays: Wisdom first scatters the soldiers of darkness from the strongholds of the soul, and then destroys them. Through wisdom, all psychological weaknesses are driven out first, and ultimately the roots of all evils afflicting the soul are completely destroyed. Enchanted sword: Wisdom, from the all-conquering power of soul-revealing discrimination, which comes to the devotee through meditation.

Spiritual interpretation:

Like a victorious warrior, one who is lord of the self is a mighty conqueror of the senses. Using the divine ecstasy-enchanted sword of wisdom, that exalted devotee temporarily drives away and then ultimately destroys the doubt-creating soldiers of darkness: the fears, sorrows, and worries that invade the soul.

Practical Application:

The kingdom of man's happiness is coveted by the celestial crusaders of wisdom and also by the soldiers of sordid sense lusts. Often the empire of inner contentment becomes the battleground of the opposing battalions of good and evil. The soul Prince of Peace should not remain inert, inactive in the face of this contest, but should train his army of discrimination in the art of combating the invading hordes of undesirable temptations. Thus supported by discrimination, the mentally strong man should drive away will-paralyzing fears and sorrows that invade the peace of his soul. He should remember that if Emperor Evil usurps his kingdom of contentment, its utter disruption will ensue. But if King Virtue is victorious, the peace in his kingdom of happiness will be unending.

This stanza of Khayyam's could have none other than a spiritual significance. The literal truth here stands before us: distinctly revealing Omar's underlying purpose in clothing his spiritual thoughts with the attractive garb of material imagery.

For additional context, quatrains LX and LXVI are also included below, respectively, but only with a glossary as interpreted by Paramahansa Yogananda. Quatrain LX:

And strange to tell, among the Earthen Lot

Some could articulate, while others not:

And suddenly one more impatient cried—

"Who is the Potter, pray, and who the Pot?"

Glossary—Earthen lot: Countless individuals born on earth. Some could articulate: Some people can speak with wisdom. Others not: Others live in dark ignorance. One more impatient: One roused by introspection and spiritual hunger. The Potter: The Creator of human beings. The pot: The bodily vessel.

Quatrain LXVI:

So while the Vessels one by one were speaking,

One spied the little Crescent all were seeking:

And then they jogg'd each other, "Brother, Brother!

Hark to the Porter's Shoulder-knot a-creaking!"

Glossary—The vessels: Reflective human beings; the bodily receptacles of all-wise souls. Were speaking: Introspecting. One spied the little crescent: One perceived in deep interiorization the omniscient spiritual eye of astral light. All were seeking: All who desire the realization of truth are seeking, consciously or unconsciously, the spiritual eye of wisdom with its all-knowing intuitive perception. Hark: Listen with deep attention. The Porter's shoulder-knot: God, the Divine Conveyer who shoulders all human vessels, which He has strung and interknotted with vibratory universal life. A-creaking: The sound of the Cosmic Vibration, God's creative power and cosmic life responsible for universal creation and the support of human lives.

Juan Cole published a contemporary English poetic translation, partially in free verse with some blank verse, of the Bodleian manuscript in 2020.

Quatrain 40:

Don't blame the stars for virtues or for faults,
or for the joy and grief decreed by fate!
For science holds the planets all to be
A thousand times more helpless than are we.

In 2022 Akbar Golrang, born in Abadan in Iran in 1945, published his English translation of 123 rubaiyat.

=== German ===
Adolf Friedrich von Schack (1815–1894) published a German translation in 1878.

Quatrain 151 (equivalent of FitzGerald's quatrain XI in his 1st edition, as above):

Gönnt mir, mit dem Liebchen im Gartenrund
Zu weilen bei süßem Rebengetränke,
Und nennt mich schlimmer als einen Hund,
Wenn ferner an's Paradies ich denke!

Friedrich Martinus von Bodenstedt (1819–1892) published a German translation in 1881. The translation eventually consisted of 395 quatrains.

Quatrain IX, 59 (equivalent of FitzGerald's quatrain XI in his 1st edition, as above):

Im Frühling mag ich gern im Grüne weilen
Und Einsamkeit mit einer Freundin teilen
Und einem Kruge Wein. Mag man mich schelten:
Ich lasse keinen andern Himmel gelten.

=== French ===
The first French translation, of 464 quatrains in prose, was made by J. B. Nicolas, chief interpreter at the French embassy in Persia in 1867.

Prose stanza (equivalent of FitzGerald's quatrain XI in his 1st edition, as above):

Au printemps j’aime à m’asseoir au bord d’une prairie, avec une idole semblable à une houri et une cruche de vin, s’il y en a, et bien que tout cela soit généralement blâmé, je veux être pire qu’un chien si jamais je songe au paradis.

The best-known version in French is the free verse edition by Franz Toussaint (1879–1955) published in 1924. This translation consisting of 170 quatrains was done from the original Persian text, while most of the other French translations were themselves translations of FitzGerald's work. The Éditions d'art Henri Piazza published the book almost unchanged between 1924 and 1979. Toussaint's translation has served as the basis of subsequent translations into other languages, but Toussaint did not live to witness the influence his translation has had.

Quatrain XXV (equivalent of FitzGerald's quatrain XI in his 1st edition, as above):

Au printemps, je vais quelquefois m’asseoir à la lisière d’un champ fleuri. Lorsqu’une belle jeune fille m’apporte une coupe de vin, je ne pense guère à mon salut. Si j’avais cette préoccupation, je vaudrais moins qu’un chien.

=== Russian ===
Many Russian-language translations have been undertaken, reflecting the popularity of the Rubaiyat in Russia since the late 19th century and the increasingly popular tradition of using it for the purposes of bibliomancy. The earliest verse translation (by Vasily Velichko) was published in 1891. The version by Osip Rumer published in 1914 is a translation of FitzGerald's version. Rumer later published a version of 304 rubaiyat translated directly from Persian. A lot of poetic translations (some based on verbatim translations into prose by others) were also written by German Plisetsky, Konstantin Bal'mont, Cecilia Banu, I. I. Tkhorzhevsky (ru), L. Pen'kovsky, and others.

=== Other languages ===
- Afrikaans: Poet Cornelis Jacobus Langenhoven (1873–1932, author of "Die Stem van Suid-Afrika") produced the first translation in Afrikaans. Herman Charles Bosman wrote a translation into Afrikaans published in 1948.
- Albanian: Fan Noli produced a translation in 1927, the melody and poetics of which are highly regarded.
- Arabic: The first Arabic translation was made from FitzGerald's English into septets (suba'iyat), by Wadi' al-Bustani in 1911. Ahmed Rami, a famous late Egyptian poet, translated the work into Arabic. His translation was sung by Umm Kulthum.
- Armenian: Armenian poet Kevork Emin has translated several verses of the Rubaiyat.
- Assyrian: (see Syriac below).
- Belarusian: 172 rubaiyat were translated by Ryhor Baradulin in 1989.
- Bengali:Satyendranath Dutta Kantichandra Ghosh, Muhammad Shahidullah (in 1942), Kazi Nazrul Islam (in 1958), Shakti Chattopadhyay (in 1978) and Hemendra Kumar Roy produced translations into Bengali.
- Catalan: Ramon Vives Pastor published a verse translation (1907) from the Nicolas' French one and the Fitzgerald's; in 2010, two direct translations from the Persian were published: a rhythmic one by Àlex Queraltó, and the other by Ramon Gaja, in verse and maintaining the original rhyme.
- Chinese: Kerson Huang based a Chinese version on FitzGerald's version.
- Cornish: In 1990, Jowann Richards produced a Cornish translation.
- Czech: First Czech translator is Josef Štýbr. At first he translated from English (from FitzGerald's "translations") (1922), after that from original language (1931). Translation from the original can be found on Czech wikisource (770 poems). Subsequent translators are mentioned here.
- Dutch: The poet J. H. Leopold (1865–1925) rendered a number of rubaiyat into Dutch.
- Estonian: Haljand Udam produced an Estonian translation.
- Amharic: መልከዐ ዑመር or Melk'ea Umer translated by Prof. Tesfaye Gessesse in 1986 E.C
- Finnish: the first translations were made by Toivo Lyy in 1929. More recently Jaakko Hämeen-Anttila (1999 and 2008) and Kiamars Baghban with Leevi Lehto (2009) have translated Khayyam into Finnish.
- Galician: Xabier Correa Corredoira published a Galician translation in 2010.
- Greek: Christos Marketis translated 120 rubaiyat into Greek in 1975.
- Hindi: Maithili Sharan Gupt and Harivanshrai Bachchan translated the book into Hindi in 1959.
- Hungarian: The earliest translation in Hungarian consisted of a few stanzas taken from the French version of Nicolas, by Béla Erődi in 1919–20. Lőrinc Szabó finalized his translation of the FitzGerald version in 1943.
- Icelandic: Eyjólfur J. Melan translated the Rubaiyat in 1921 (Ferhendur Omars Khayyam), the same year as Einar Benediktsson (Ferhendur tjaldarans), Magnús Ásgeirsson translated the Rubaiyat in 1935. Jochum M. Eggertsson (Skuggi) published a translation in 1946 and Helgi Hálfdánarson in 1953. All translations are of FitzGerald's version, Helgi translated from the newer version.
- Irish: Tadhg Ó Donnchadha (Torna) translated the Rubaiyat from English into Irish in 1920.
- Italian: Francesco Gabrieli produced an Italian translation (Le Rubaiyyàt di Omar Khayyàm) in 1944. Alessandro Zazzaretta produced a translation in 1960, and Alessandro Bausani produced another translation in 1965.
- Japanese: In 1910, Kakise Hikozo translated 110 poems from the 5th edition of FitzGerald's translation. The first translation from Persian into the classical Japanese language was made by a linguist, Shigeru Araki, in 1920. Among various other translations, Ogawa highly evaluates Ryo Mori's (ja:森亮), produced in 1931. In Japan, until 1949, more than 10 poets and/or scholars made translations into Japanese. The first complete translation from Persian into the modern Japanese language was made by Ryosaku Ogawa in 1949, which is still popular and has been published from Iwanami Shoten (it is now in the public domain and also freely available from Aozora Bunko). Historically, the first attempt was six poems translated by Kambara Ariake in 1908.
- Jèrriais: Fraînque Le Maistre produced a Jèrriais version (based on FitzGerald's 1st edition) during the German occupation of the Channel Islands (1940–1945).
- Kannada: D. V. Gundappa translated the work into Kannada as a collection of poems titled Umarana Osage in 1952.
- Kurdish: The Kurdish poet Hajar translated the Rubaiyat in his Chwar Parchakani Xayam.
- Latvian: It was translated into Latvian by Andrejs Kurcijs in 1970.
- Malayalam: G. Sankara Kurup produced a translation into Malayalam (1932). Thirunalloor Karunakaran translated the Rubaiyat in 1989.
- Odia: Gopal Chandra Kanungo illustrated and translated the FitzGerald's book into Odia in 1954. Devdas Chhotray adapted Edward FitzGerald's work into Odia and recorded it in musical form in 2011. Radha Mohan Gadanayak also translated the Rubaiyat into Odia in the 1950s or 1960s. Nandakishore Satapathy and Haraprasad Das translated the book in 2007 and 2008.
- Polish: Several collections of Rubaiyat have appeared, including ones by Professor Andrzej Gawroński (1933, 1969), regarded as the best.
- Romanian: In 2015 it was translated into Romanian for the first time by orientalist philologist Gheorghe Iorga.
- Sanskrit: Srimadajjada Adibhatla Narayana Das (1864–1945) translated the original Persian quatrains and Edward FitzGerald's English translations into Sanskrit and pure-Telugu. Pandit Narayana Das claimed his translation was more literal than that of FitzGerald. (See Ajjada Adibhatla Narayana Dasu.)
- Scots: Scottish poet Rab Wilson published a Scots version in 2004.
- Serbo-Croatian: The first translation of nine short poems into Serbo-Croatian was published in 1920, and was the work of Safvet beg Bašagić. In 1932, Jelena Skerlić Ćorović re-published these nine, alongside 75 more poems. In 1964, noted orientalist Fehim Bajraktarević published his translation of the Rubaiyat.
- Slovene: The first translator into Slovene was Alojz Gradnik, his translation being published in 1955. It was translated again by Slovene translator and poet Bert Pribac in 2007 from the French Toussaint edition.
- Spanish language. The General Eduardo Hay translated the Rubaiyat into Spanish. The third edition was published in 1938. Title: Rúbaiyát de Omar Khayyam, versión de Eduardo Hay.
- Sureth: The Assyrian author Eshaya Elisha Khinno translated the Rubaiyat into Sureth (Assyrian Neo-Aramaic) in 2012
- Swahili: Robert Bin Shaaban produced a version in Swahili (dated 1948, published 1952).
- Swedish: Eric Hermelin translated the Rubaiyat into Swedish in 1928.
- Syriac: The Assyrian journalist and poet Naum Faiq translated the Rubaiyat into the Syriac.
- Tagalog: Poet and linguist Ildefonso Santos published his Tagalog translation in 1953.
- Telugu: Duvvoori Ramireddy translated the Rubaiyat into Telugu in 1935. Srimadajjada Adibhatla Narayana Das (1864–1945) translated the original Persian quatrains and Edward FitzGerald's English translations into Sanskrit and pure Telugu.
- Thai. At least four versions exist in Thai. These translations were made from the text of FitzGerald. Their respective authors are HRH Prince Narathip Prapanpong, Rainan Aroonrungsee (pen name: Naan Gitirungsi), Pimarn Jamjarus (pen name: Kaen Sungkeet), and Suriyachat Chaimongkol.
- Welsh: Sir John Morris-Jones translated directly from Persian into Welsh in 1928. Thomas Ifor Rees produced a Welsh translation, published in Mexico City in 1939.
- Vietnamese: Hồ Thượng Tuy translated from English into Vietnamese (from FitzGerald's 1st edition) in 1990. Nguyễn Viết Thắng produced a Vietnamese translation of 487 rubaiyat, translated from English and Russian in 1995 and published in Hanoi in 2003.

== Musical settings ==
Settings to music of some or all of the Rubaiyat have included works by Granville Bantock (British), Arthur Foote (American), Einojuhani Rautavaara (Finnish), and Lex van Delden (Dutch). Among the last music James Joyce was ever to hear, Christmas 1940, was Count John McCormack singing 'Ah, Moon of my Delight' from Liza Lehmann’s 1896 song-cycle In a Persian Garden. The song's lyrics as sung by McCormack, unaltered but for one word, are the two final Quatrains (LXXIV and LXXV) from Fitzgerald’s first edition (‘Ah, Moon of my Delight who know'st no wane…’).

== See also ==
- Somerton Man
- Ubi sunt § Persian poetry
