= Haljand Udam =

Estonian orientalist and translator

Haljand Udam (May 8, 1936 – December 17, 2005) was an Estonian orientalist and translator.

== Early life and career ==
Udam was born in Rakvere in 1936 and graduated from Tartu University as a geologist, but soon became interested in Eastern culture, including Ancient Iranian literature. He studied oriental languages in Tashkent university and Moscow State University Initially specializing in Indology, he became interested in traditionalist philosophers like Guénon. In Moscow, Udam defended his candidate's thesis in 1971 (“On the Special Semantic Aspects of the Persian Sufi Terminology”). Udam has translated several works from Arabic (Ibn Tufail), Persian (Rudaki, Saadi, Ali Safi), Urdu, Tajik, and other languages into Estonian, including Omar Khayyam's Rubaiyat. He also worked as an editor and contributed to Estonian Encyclopedia (Eesti Entsüklopeedia).

Some of his articles on orientalism have also been published in foreign language magazines. Just before his death, Udam managed to finish the translation of the Quran into Estonian. It was published on 19 December 2007. Udam was also known as one of the few Estonian intellectuals who aligned with the Conservative Revolution.

Udam was the leading scholar of Islam in Estonia. He died in Viterbo, Italy in 2005.

== Bibliography ==
- Orienditeekond, Tallinn 2001, ISBN 9985-77-008-0 (see a review http://20th-century-history-books.com/B0008DAQUI.html)
