= Cecilia Banu =

Soviet writer (1911–1998)

- Cecilia Banu and her husband, Abolqasem Lahuti
- Born: Cecilia Bentsianovna Bakaleyshchik; 13 March 1911; Lyubech, Chernigov province
- Died: 11 January 1998 (aged 86); Moscow
- Citizenship: Soviet Union
- Education: University of Kiev
- Occupation: Translator
- Spouse: Abulqosim Lohuti
- Writing career
- Language: Russian
- Period: 1936–1998
- Notable work: Translation into Russian of Shahnameh (Ferdowsi)
- Notable awards: Honored Cultural Worker of the Tajik SSR

Cecilia Bencianovna Banu (Russian: Цецилия Бенциановна Бану, pronounced [tsɨˈtsɨlʲɪə bʲɪntsɨˈanəvnə bɐˈnu]; 13 March 1911 – 11 January 1998), née Bakaleyshchik (Бакалейщик [bəkɐˈlʲejɕːɪk]), was a Soviet and Russian scholar of Iranian studies, a poet and a translator from Persian to Russian. She is best known for her multi-volume translation of the Shahnameh of Ferdowsi. She was the wife of Abulqosim Lohuti.

== Life ==
Cecilia Bakaleyshchik was born in 1911 in a Jewish family in Lyubech, Chernigov Governorate, in the Russian Empire (now in Ukraine). She graduated from the University of Kiev with a degree in Iranian Studies. Among Persians, she became known as Selsela banu, or Cecilia Banu, which then became her nom de plume.

Cecilia moved to Samarkand at the age of eighteen, where she met Abulqosim Lohuti, a Soviet litterateur of Iranian origin, who was a professor of classical Persian literature there and a correspondent for Pravda and Izvestia. They married when she was 19 or 20 years old. They had a daughter, Leili, who became an Iranologist; their older son, Dalir, a philologist, philosopher and translator; and their younger son, Giv, a journalist and translator. Their granddaughter Maya was an art restorer, and their grandson Felix was a composer.

Lohuti and Banu initially lived in his one-bedroom apartment in Moscow. After the birth of their first two children, it became difficult to manage in the small flat. When, in 1934, Lohuti was made executive secretary of the Union of Soviet Writers, they were offered a larger apartment. Fierce opposition from residents being evicted prevented them from taking up the property. Lohuti wrote in some anguish to Molotov that he was unable to concentrate on the work assigned to him by the State, and that his family was falling ill. It took a year and Stalin's intervention for a larger flat to be granted. By 1937, they were able to obtain more spacious accommodation.

However, by the time she began her monumental translation of the Shahnameh, Banu and her family were living in relative poverty in Ivanovka, near Moscow. These were troubled years politically, but in the midst of artistically inclined neighbours, they were able to find the tranquility required for work.

She became one of the founding members of the Union of Soviet Writers in 1934, on Maxim Gorky's recommendation. She was named as an Honored Cultural Worker of Tajik SSR.

Cecilia Banu died in Moscow on 11 January 1998 at the age of 89; her husband died much sooner at the age of 69 due to his ailing health.

== Career ==
Cecilia Banu published three volumes of poetry. She also became known as a brilliant translator from Persian.

=== Lahouti ===
Banu translated much of her husband's oeuvre into Russian. She also worked with him in the translation of Russian and European works into the Tajik language. King Lear, which had been presented in Yiddish to great acclaim by Solomon Mikhoels and the Moscow State Jewish Theatre, was one translation; another was Othello, which was presented in Tajik during the Decade of Tajik Art in Moscow in 1941.

In 1938, her husband wrote The Story of a Rose (Dāstān-e gol) in Tajik in a private letter addressed to Stalin, hoping to persuade him to support Mikhoels and the Jewish Theatre in the midst of the Great Purge. Its poetic translation into Russian by Banu accompanied the original. To Lohuti's fury, Stalin called the poem a sycophantic thing, following which Lohuti remained in disgrace until Stalin's death.

In 1941, to celebrate the Decade of Tajik Literature and Culture in Moscow, Lahouti wrote the libretto to the opera Kaveh the Blacksmith in six acts, based on the themes of the Shahnameh. This was translated into Russian by Banu with E. G. Dorfman.

=== Omar Khayyam ===
Besides these, she also translated the Persian poetry of Omar Khayyam, Rudaki, Rumi, Saadi Shirazi, Hafez, as well as her magnum opus, the translation of the Shahnameh of Ferdowsi. Thirty-eight ruba'is of Khayyam were rendered into excellent and simply styled Russian by Banu, hewing closely to the original Persian in meaning and form. The book was published in Tajikistan but was difficult to find, and attracted attention only much later.

=== Ferdowsi ===
Cecilia Banu began her first translations of the Shahnameh, with the publication of several dastans in the newspaper Pravda. Her attempts to capture the rhythm and style of the original were already evident. At the first Union of Soviet Writers that same year, Maxim Gorky recommended a full translation of the poem and advised Banu to occupy herself with the translation of classical Eastern poetry into the Russian, pointing out that she had someone close to her, her husband, who fully understood the nuances of the East.

The complete translation of the Shahnameh was instigated by Lohuti, who with Banu, chose the Nafisi-Vullers (1936) edition of the Persian text. Having read through the poem twice and with her husband's commentary on each verse, Banu began the six-volume translation in 1957. Lohuti edited the first volume, which appeared on the day he died; subsequent volumes were published intermittently until 1989. The translation was widely lauded for its scholarly and poetic merit. Banu chose the amphibrachic tetrameter, which she felt most closely approximated both the original Persian meter as well as the melodic aspect of folk performances.

When their work on the Shahnameh began, there had been no commitment to publication. The Institute of Oriental Studies of the Moscow Academy of Sciences was opposed to the work, with some participants preferring a prose translation to a poetic one. There was also a political battle between Lahouti and the director of the Institute that had escalated to the upper echelons of the Soviet government, and it appears that the first volume of the Shahnameh saw publication only because Jawaharlal Nehru, during a visit to the Soviet Union in 1955, remarked in surprise that there was no extant Russian translation of the epic.

Even after Lohuti's death, there continued to be an opposition to the publication of the later volumes of the Shahnameh. The second volume, for instance, came out only after the intercession of Nina Petrovna Khrushcheva.

=== Other poets ===
Banu translated the Nay-nama, the overture of Rumi's Masnavi. This translation, along with several others – prose and poetic – was criticised for replacing the original imagery with Russian poetic standards, losing the nuance of the original. On the other hand, her translation of Saadi Shirazi's ghazal Caravan was called 'masterly' for its capture of the original's meter and rhythm.

Banu's efforts at translating Hafez into Russian have also been documented.

== Selected works ==
=== Poetry ===
- Два письма [Two Letters]. State Press of Tajikistan. 1942.
- Нераздельный союз. State Press of Tajikistan. 1942.
- Рассказ пионера. State Press of Tajikistan. 1942.

=== Translations ===
==== Ferdowsi ====
- A. Lahouti, ed. (1957). Shahnameh. Vol. 1. Translated by C. Banu.
- A. Starikov, ed. (1960). Shahnameh. Vol. 2. Translated by C. Banu.
- A. Azer; C. Banu, eds. (1965). Shahnameh. Vol. 3. Translated by C. Banu.
- V. Lukonin, ed. (1969). Shahnameh. Vol. 4. Translated by C. Banu.
- V. Lukonin, ed. (1984). Shahnameh. Vol. 5. Translated by C. Banu; V. Berznev.
- L. Lahuti, ed. (1989). Shahnameh. Vol. 6. Translated by C. Banu; V. Berznev.

==== Omar Khayyam ====
- Четверостишия [Quatrains]. Translated by K. Arseneva; C. Banu. Pamir. 1973.
- Рубайи [Rubaiyat]. Translated by C. Banu; K. Arseneva. 1983.

==== Abulqosim Lohuti ====
- В Европе. Moscow: Goslitizdat. 1936.
- Два ордена. Moscow: Goslitizdat. 1936.
- Садовник. Stalinabad: State Press of Tajik SSR. 1937.
- Семья народов. Stalinabad: State Press of Tajik SSR. 1938.
- Непобедимая земля. Stalinabad: Goslitizdat. 1943.
- Избранное. 1954.

==== Others ====
- В сад я вышел на заре. Dushanbe: Irfon. 1983. (contains works by Rumi, Lahouti, et al.)
- L. Lahuti, ed. (2016). Жемчужины персидской поэзии: Переводы Цецилии Бану [Gems of Persian Poetry: Translated by Cecilia Banu]. ISBN 978-5-98856-239-9. (comprised works by Rudaki, Saadi, Hafez and Lahouti, among others)

== Sources ==
- Abdullaeva, F.; Chalisova, N.; Melville, C. (2012). "The Russian perception of Khayyām: from text to image" (PDF). In A.A. Seyed-Gohrab (ed.). The Great 'Umar Khayyām. Leiden University. ISBN 978-9087281571.
- ʿĀbedi, Kāmyār (2009). "Lahuti, Abu'l-Qasem". Encyclopedia Iranica.
- Armeeva, R. (8 November 2003). ""Книга царей" родом из Ивановки". Odintsovo.info.
- Chalisova, N. (1991). "Караван" (PDF). In Prigarina, N.I. (ed.). Сад одного цветка. Moscow: Nauka. ISBN 5-02-016750-9.
- Chalisova, N. (2006). "Šāh-nāma translations xiv. Into Russian". Encyclopedia Iranica.
- Chalisova, N. (2007). "Rumi in Russia: A story of translation" (PDF). International Mevlana Symposium Papers. Vol. 3. Istanbul: Motto Project. ISBN 978-605-61104-0-5.
- Kirasirova, Masha (2017). "My Enemy's Enemy: Consequences of the CIA Operation against Abulqasim Lahuti, 1953–54". Iranian Studies. 50 (3): 439–465. doi:10.1080/00210862.2017.1292817. S2CID 151876817.
- Lahuti, L.G. (2010). "Читая Хафиза. (три газели Хафиза и их переводы в переписке А. н. Болдырева и Ц. Б. Бану)". Irano-Slavica (2).
- Lahuti, L.G.; Chalisova, N. (2018). "Persian Nightingale in the Garden of the Soviet Country: A Poem 'The Story of a Rose' by Abulkasim Lahuti" (PDF). In V.V. Naumkin (ed.). Bulletin of the Institute of Oriental Studies. Vol. 4. Russian Academy of Sciences. ISSN 2618-7302.
- Slezkin, Y. (2018). "Новая жизнь". Rīgas Laiks.
- Shoziyoeva, Gulmo (2016). Становление фирдоусиведения в Таджикистане (30-40 гг. XX века) (PDF) (Thesis). Dushanbe: Rudaki Institute of language, literature, oriental and written heritage.
- Surush, M. (2014). Время и мысли. Dushanbe: Adib.
- "Успех трагедии "Отелло" на таджикском языке". Vostochno-Sibirskaya Pravda. No. 95. TASS. 23 April 1941.
- Timenchik, Roman (2017). "Путеводитель по "Записным книжкам" Ахматовой". Пермяковский зборник. Vol. 2. ISBN 978-5457369320.
- Turchinsky, L.; Tarasenkov, A. (2004). Русские поэты XX века. 1900-1955. Studia Poetica. ISBN 978-5041073497.
- "БАНУ Цецилия Бенциановна". Encyclopedia of Russian Jewry. 1994. p. 411.
- "Omar Khayyam". Японский Городовой. 1998.
