= Abolqasem Lahouti =

Iranian-Soviet poet and activist (1887–1957)

- ابولقاسم لاهوتی
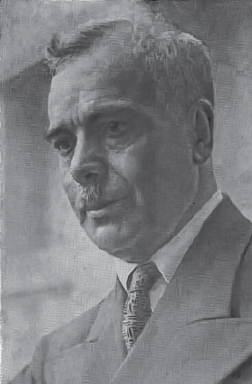
- Born: Abolqasem Elhami; 12 October 1887; Kermanshah, Iran
- Died: 16 March 1957 (aged 69); Moscow Oblast, Russian SFSR, Soviet Union
- Occupations: Poet and politician
- Spouse: Cecilia Banu
- Writing career
- Pen name: Abolqasem Lahouti
- Period: Modernism
- Genre: Poetry
- Literary movement: Socialist realism

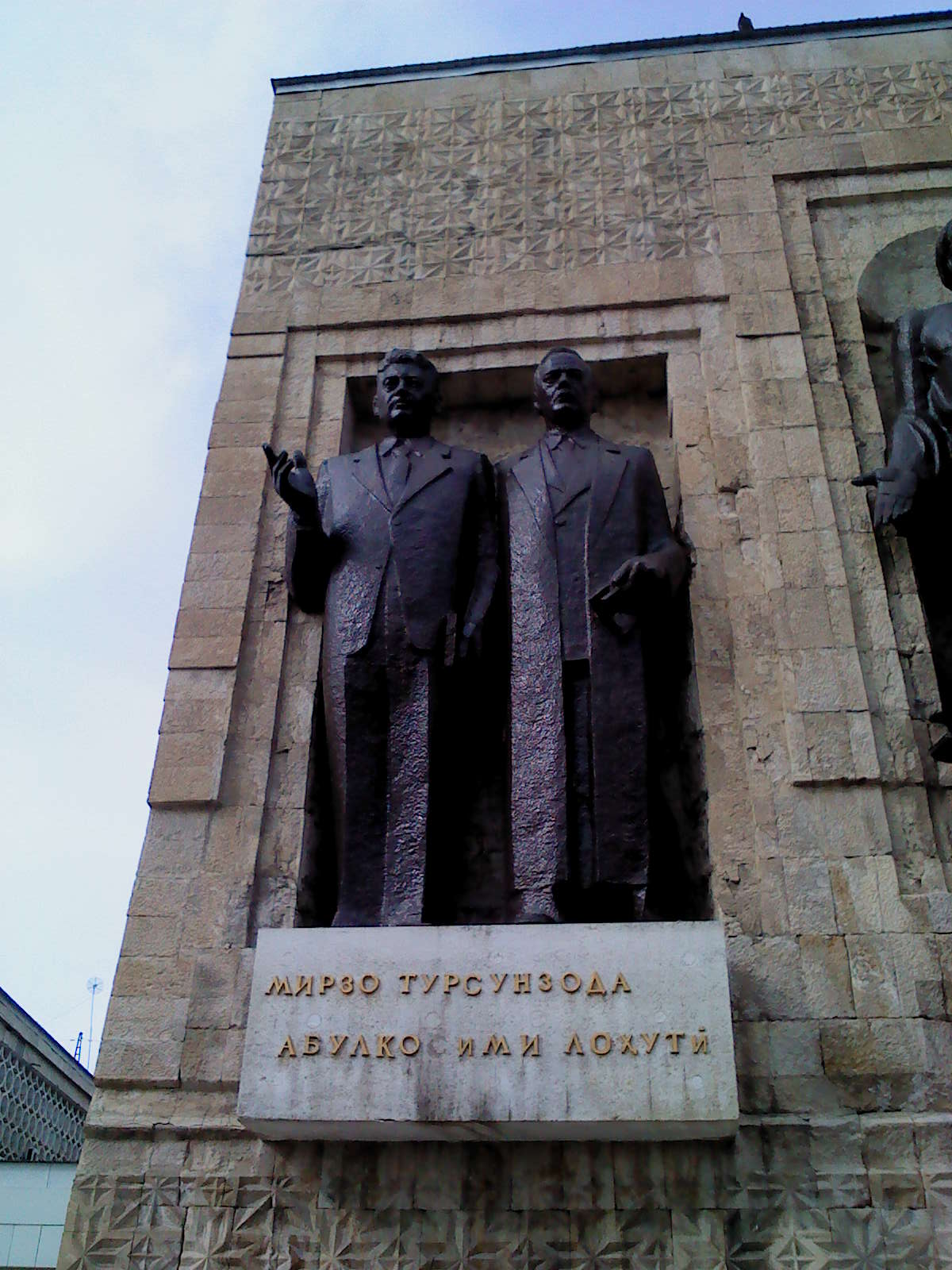
Abolqasem Lahouti's statue (right) alongside Mirzo Tursunzoda (left) at Tajik Writers Union building, Dushanbe

Abulqosim Ahmadzoda Lohuti (Note: Russian: Абулькасим Ахмедзаде Лахути, romanized: Abuljkasim Ahmedzade Lahuti, pronounced [ɐˌbulʲkɐˈsʲim ɐxˌmʲedzɐˈdʲe ləxʊˈtʲi]; Persian: ابوالقاسم احمدزاده لاهوتی, romanized: Abulqâsem Ahmedzâde Lâhuti, pronounced [æˌbuːlqɒːˈsem æɦˌmædzɒːˈde ˌlɒːhuːˈtʰiː]; Tajik: Абулқосим Аҳмадзода Лоҳутӣ, romanized: Abulqosim Ahmadzoda Lohutiy, pronounced [ɐˌbulqɔˈsɪm ɐɦˌmadzɔˈda lɔhuˈti]) (/əˌbʊlkəˈsɪm ləˈhuːti/; 12 October 1887 – 16 March 1957) was an Iranian-Soviet poet and political activist who was active in Iran during the Persian Constitutional Revolution and in Tajikistan in the early Soviet era.

== Biography ==
Born on 12 October 1887 in Kermanshah to an Iranian cobbler and religious poet named Mirza Ahmad Elhami, he began writing poetry in early adolescence under the pen name Lahouti (which Encyclopædia Iranica translates as 'belonging to the world of the occult'). His first poem was printed in the newspaper Habl al-Matin (magazine) in Calcutta at the age of 18, and in his twenties his poems were published in several prestigious publications.

He soon entered politics and even received a medal from Sattar Khan for his efforts.

Initially, he went to clerical school, but then went to Bulgaria and wrote many poems on Islam. He then came back to Iran, and enlisted in the armed forces, and graduated as Captain in rank.

After being convicted by a court in Qom and sentenced to death, he fled to Turkey, but soon returned and joined forces with Sheikh Mohammad Khiabani in Tabriz. His forces defeated Mahmud Khan Puladeen's troops, but were soon disbanded by freshly dispatched forces. He then fled to Baku.

While living in Nakhchivan Autonomous Republic, he became interested in Communism. After marrying a Russian student named Cecilia Bakaleyshchik, who would become a Persian-language poet and translator under the pen name Cecilia Banu (Sisil Banu), he was unable to initiate a coup d'etat against the central government of Iran, so he gave up and moved to USSR where he remained until his final days.

In 1925, he went to Dushanbe and joined the friends of Sadriddin Aini. His poetry was welcomed by audiences and gained him the position of the founder of Soviet Tajik poetry.

Lohuti is the author of the Anthem of the Tajik Soviet Socialist Republic lyrics. Other works of his include Kaveh the Blacksmith («Коваи оҳангар», 1947), Kremlin («Кремл», 1923), The Crown and the Flag («Тоҷ ва байрақ», 1935), among many others. His collection of poetry, in six volumes, was published between 1960 and 1963.

He died on 16 March 1957 at the age of 69 in Moscow.
