= Edward Henry Whinfield =

Edward Henry Whinfield (1836–1922) was a translator of Persian literature. He wrote the first well-commented English translations of Hafez and Rumi, as well as a side-by-side translation of 500 quatrains of the Rubáiyát of Omar Khayyám in 1883.
