= Jessie Cadell =

English novelist and orientalist (1844–1884)

- Born: Jessie Ellen Nash; 23 August 1844; London, England
- Died: 17 June 1884 (aged 39); Florence, Kingdom of Italy
- Occupations: Novelist; translator; orientalist
- Spouse: Henry Moubray Cadell (m. 1861; died 1867)
- Children: 2
- Writing career
- Language: English
- Years active: 1876–1884

Jessie Ellen Cadell (née Nash; 23 August 1844 – 17 June 1884) was an English novelist, translator and orientalist.

== Early life and family ==
Cadell was born on 23 August 1844, in London, the son of merchant William Nash and Emma Nash (née Jell, later Liptrop). (Note: Also cited as Scotland.) Following the death of her father, Cadell's mother married General Liptrop with whom the family went to British India with in 1859. On 2 February 1861, Nash married Henry Moubray Cadell (1831–1867), a Captain in the Bengal Army, in Ferozepore. (Note: Also cited as Mowbray.) The couple had two sons, and lived primarily in Peshawar and spent time in the north-west frontier. Returning to Europe in 1864, the family lived in France and Algeria until Henry's death in 1867 in Algiers. (Note: Also cited as 1868.) Cadell first settled in Edinburgh, the same city in which her mother-in-law resided, until 1873 when she settled in London.

== Career ==
Cadell wrote two novels during her lifetime, Ida Craven and Worthy: a Study of Friendship, both of which contained elements of her own personal experience. Published in 1876, Ida Craven depicted a young woman in Peshawar during the early 1860s coming to terms with marriage to a much older officer. The novel contained critic of British life in India, partially the lack of sympathy shown by the British establishment. Cadell's second novel was completed just before her death in 1884, and depicted a young widow of an Indian army officer was she struggles to bring up her son. The novel was posthumously published in 1895, by her son John.

Having first studied Persian whilst living in Peshawar, Cadell continued her orientalist studies in Edinburgh. Cadell devoted herself especially to the study of Omar Khayyam, the Persian astronomer and poet. Without seeking to compete with Edward FitzGerald's splendid paraphrase of Khayyam in its own line, Cadell contemplated a complete edition and a more accurate translation. She visited numerous public libraries in quest of manuscripts and published a portion of her research in an article in Fraser's Magazine in May 1879. Friedrich von Bodenstedt, when publishing his own German translation, praised Cadell's work.

In addition to her translations of Khayyam, Cadell planned to write a history of India. From 1879, her health worsened and she moved to the Kingdom of Italy and lived in Siena and Florence. On 17 June 1884, Cadell died in Florence aged 39. The Athenaeum said after her death that "She was a brave, frank, true woman, bright and animated in the midst of sickness and trouble, disinterestedly attached to whatever was good and excellent, a devoted mother, a staunch and sympathising friend." A volume of her translations of the Rubaiyat of Omar Khayyam was published posthumously in 1899 by her friend Richard Garnett.

== Bibliography ==
- Ida Craven (1876)
- Worthy: a Study of Friendship (1895)
- The Ruba'yat of Omar Khayam, trans. Jessie Cadell (1899)
