= Mikhail Grinberg =

Israeli publisher, historian, and Jewish community activist

- Михаил Гринберг
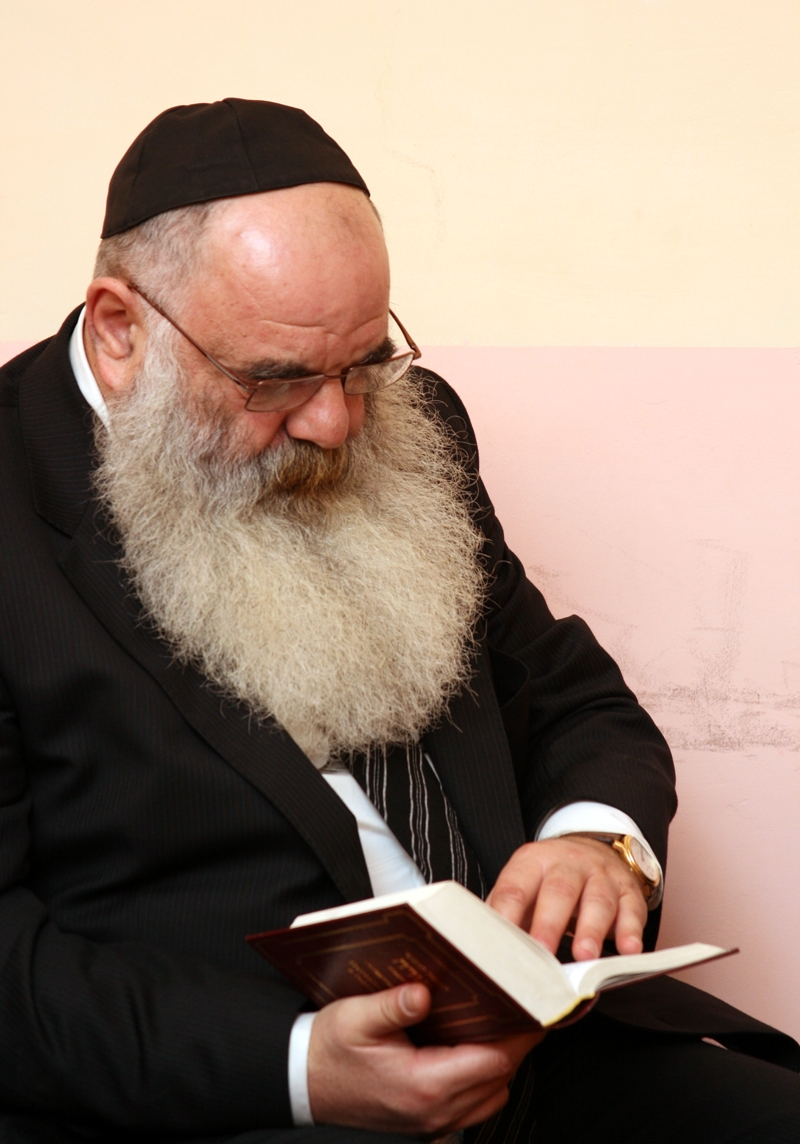
- Grinberg in 2008
- Born: 2 September 1951 (age 75); Troitsk, Chelyabinsk Oblast, Soviet Union
- Citizenship: Israeli
- Education: Moscow Correspondence Pedagogical Institute
- Occupations: Publisher, Jewish community activist, historian
- Awards: Pushkin Medal (2012)

Mikhail Lvovich Grinberg (Russian: Михаил Львович Гринберг; born 2 September 1951) is an Israeli publisher, Jewish community public figure, and historian.

Grinberg was born into a traditional Jewish family. He was expelled from the Komsomol and later from university for observing Jewish traditions, but eventually completed his studies in history. He worked as a teacher and served in the Soviet army. In 1988, he immigrated to Israel. He lives in Efrat, in Judea (the West Bank).

From the late 1970s, he took an active part in the revival of Jewish life in the Soviet Union, notably restoring the synagogue and Jewish communal life in Malakhovka. At the request of the Lubavitcher Rebbe, he arranged the reburial of Rabbi Mordehai Dubin and restored the graves of several prominent rabbis. In 1990, he took part in the religious revival of the Jewish community in Lviv.

Grinberg published several scholarly works, including a study of Bishop Andrei (Ukhtomsky), on which he later based his doctoral dissertation. He taught Jewish history in underground study groups and later in Israel, the United States and Canada. In 1992, he became rector of the Jewish University in Moscow and launched the first Russian-language academic journal devoted to Jewish studies.

In 1990, Grinberg founded the publishing house Gesharim / Bridging Cultures, which became one of the leading centres of Russian-language Jewish studies in Israel and the post-Soviet space. Under his leadership, more than 600 books were published. He later continued this work through a new project, the Mikhail Grinberg Library.

== Biography ==
Grinberg was born into a Jewish family that observed several basic religious traditions. His father was a veteran of the Great Patriotic War and had commanded a signals company. He developed a love of reading during his school years.

In 1970, Grinberg was expelled from the Komsomol because of his religious beliefs. In 1973, four months before he was due to defend his diploma thesis, he was also expelled from the Ryazan Pedagogical Institute, where he was studying history, after someone reported that he had had a traditional Jewish wedding. He then taught at an evening school in Lytkarino, near Moscow. A year and a half later, he enrolled at the Moscow Correspondence Pedagogical Institute, where he completed his studies and received his diploma.

After graduating, Grinberg was drafted into the Soviet Armed Forces and served in the missile units of the Soviet Air Defence Forces. During his military service, he received 19 commendations, two of them personally from Defence Minister Andrei Grechko: one for preparing missiles for a test range and the other for preparations for a parade on Red Square.

In 1988, Grinberg immigrated to Israel. He lives in the Israeli settlement of Efrat in Judea (West Bank).

== Public activities ==
In the late 1970s, Grinberg became actively involved in the life of the Jewish community in Malakhovka, near Moscow. At the request of Rabbi Geyche, head of Moscow's Chabad community, he organised the renovation of the largely abandoned synagogue, had new furniture installed and revived Jewish religious life there, with regular prayer services, holiday celebrations and classes. To make kosher food available, he became a shochet.

In 1986, on the personal instructions of the Lubavitcher Rebbe, Grinberg arranged for the remains of Mordehai Dubin, a rabbi and Hasid of the sixth Lubavitcher Rebbe, to be transferred from a cemetery in Tula slated for demolition to the Jewish cemetery in Malakhovka. Following Dubin's successful reburial, Grinberg was entrusted with restoring the graves of tzaddikim (righteous people). He surveyed more than 25 cemeteries and discovered several forgotten graves, including those of rabbis Pinchas of Koretz and Aharon of Karlin. He organised the repair and restoration of the graves of several rabbis, including the Baal Shem Tov, Levi Yitzchok of Berditchev, and the founders of the Ruzhin, Belz and Lubavitch Hasidic dynasties. In 1987–1988, Grinberg accompanied the first groups of pilgrims from Israel and the United States to the holy sites that had been restored.

In 1990, at the request of the Chief Rabbi of Great Britain, Immanuel Jakobovits, one of London's Jewish communities undertook to support the Jewish community of Lviv. Grinberg was sent there and took part in reviving Jewish religious and cultural life.

== Academic and educational work ==
=== History of Russian Orthodoxy ===
In 1981, Grinberg completed his historical research, which resulted in the book Bishop Andrei, Prince Ukhtomsky, (Note: The book was published under the pen name Zelenogorsky.) devoted to the Russian Orthodox thinker and church figure of the late 19th and early 20th centuries. The book circulated in samizdat and gained popularity, attracting interest in church circles. A decade later, in 1991, the publishing house Terra published 50,000 copies of the book, which quickly sold out and received wide attention. In 1995, he defended a doctoral dissertation based on the book. A second, expanded edition appeared in 2011.

Grinberg published several studies in scholarly collections of the Institute of Scientific Information for Social Sciences, in Literaturnaya Rossiya, and in the journals Moskva and Almanac of the Bibliophile. His work also appeared in Old Believer publications and the Journal of the Moscow Patriarchate.

=== Jewish history and Jewish studies ===
As part of underground Jewish educational activity, Grinberg lectured on Jewish history in religious Zionist study groups that met in private homes.

From the late 1980s, Grinberg gave lectures in Israel, the United States and Canada on the restoration of Jewish holy sites, the history of Hasidism and pilgrimages to sites associated with tzaddikim. Drawing on the material he had collected, he published a bilingual photo album, Graves of Tzaddikim in Russia, showing the graves before and after restoration. Grinberg also taught a course on Jewish history at the Ohr Somayach yeshiva.

In 1992, at the suggestion of Rabbi Adin Steinsaltz, Grinberg helped establish the Jewish University in Moscow and became its rector. He launched the Bulletin of the Moscow Jewish University, then the only Russian-language academic journal devoted to Jewish studies. He later stepped down as rector to concentrate on publishing.

== Publishing career ==
Shortly after arriving in Israel, Grinberg worked briefly at the Shamir publishing house. He took part in several joint publishing projects with the Viltis printing house (formerly known as the Widow and Brothers Romm Printing House) and the publishing house Terra.

In 1990, Grinberg founded the publishing house Gesharim (also known as Bridging Cultures), which operated in Israel and Russia and published books on Jewish studies. The publishing house played an important role in the development of Jewish publishing in post-Soviet Russia and the Jewish diaspora, becoming an intellectual and educational centre dedicated to rebuilding the lost cultural and educational infrastructure for Russian-language Jewish studies. In its first 30 years, Gesharim published more than 500 titles on Jewish subjects in various genres, with a combined print run of about two million copies. By 2021, the number of titles had reached 600.

According to Vyacheslav Likhachev, Mikhail Gold, Galina Zelenina and Olga Yakovleva, the authors of a survey of Jewish publishing, Gesharim had a legitimate claim to leadership in Russian-language Jewish publishing. Roman Katsman, professor of Jewish literature at Bar-Ilan University, described Gesharim as the largest Russian-Israeli publishing house specialising in Jewish fiction and popular scholarly literature. Alexander Kulik, professor at the Hebrew University of Jerusalem, called Grinberg "the founder of Russian-Jewish publishing".

From 2002 to 2005, Gesharim published the periodical Jewish Book Peddler, edited by the philologist Leonid Katsis and devoted to reviews of Jewish literature. The literary scholar Roman Timenchik wrote a column entitled "The Russian Word in the Land of Israel". From 2006 to 2011, the project formed part of the journal Lechaim.

Grinberg later continued his publishing work through a new project, the Mikhail Grinberg Library.

== Awards and honours ==
- "Person of the Year" award of the Federation of Jewish Communities of Russia (2004).
- Certificate of Honour from the Russian Government Commission for Compatriots Living Abroad (2008).
- Pushkin Medal for his significant contribution to the preservation and development of Russian culture abroad (2012).

== Bibliography ==
=== As author ===
- Grinberg, Mikhail. Graves of Tzaddikim in Russia. Jerusalem: Shamir, 1989.
- Grinberg, Mikhail. Restoration of Jewish Holy Sites in Ukraine in 1988. Vozrozhdenie, no. 12. Jerusalem: Shamir, 1990, pp. 154–170 (in Russian).
- Grinberg, Mordechai; Grinberg, Mikhail. Asceticism and Holiness. In: Wisdom – Righteousness – Holiness in the Slavic and Jewish Cultural Tradition. Moscow: Sefer Centre; Institute of Slavic Studies of the Russian Academy of Sciences, 2011, pp. 41–54 (in Russian).
- Zelenogorsky, M. L. The Life and Activities of Archbishop Andrei (Prince Ukhtomsky). Moscow: Terra, 1991 (in Russian).
- Zelenogorsky, M. L. (2011). Жизнь и труды архиепископа Андрея (князя Ухтомского) [The Life and Works of Archbishop Andrei (Prince Ukhtomsky)] (PDF) (in Russian) (2nd, expanded ed.). Bridging Cultures.

=== As compiler and editor ===
- Shabbat Songs (Hebrew: זמירות שבת). Compiled by M. L. Grinberg. 2nd expanded edition. Jerusalem: Gesharim; Saint Petersburg: Rosprint, 1992.
- Ryabushinsky, V. P. Old Belief and Russian Religious Feeling. Compiled, with an introductory essay and commentary, by V. V. Nekhotin, V. N. Anisimova and M. L. Grinberg. Moscow: Bridging Cultures, 2010 (in Russian).
