= Gesharim =

Russian book publisher

Gesharim / Bridging Cultures is a Russian publishing house established in the 1990s by Mikhail Grinberg, which publishes books on Jewish topics in Russian language. It is linked with two associations "Gishrey Tarbut" (in Israel) and "The Bridges of Culture" (in Russia), and distributes its books primarily in these two countries.

In 2010 Gesharim was awarded a "For Merits" medal by the Euro-Asian Jewish Congress, with the remarks that "according to the opinion of many qualified readers, 'Gesharim' is the best publishing house that publishes books on Jewish topics in Russian today. Year after year it enriches Russian Jews, wherever they might live, with Jewish books of the highest level."
