= Roman Davidovich Timenchik =

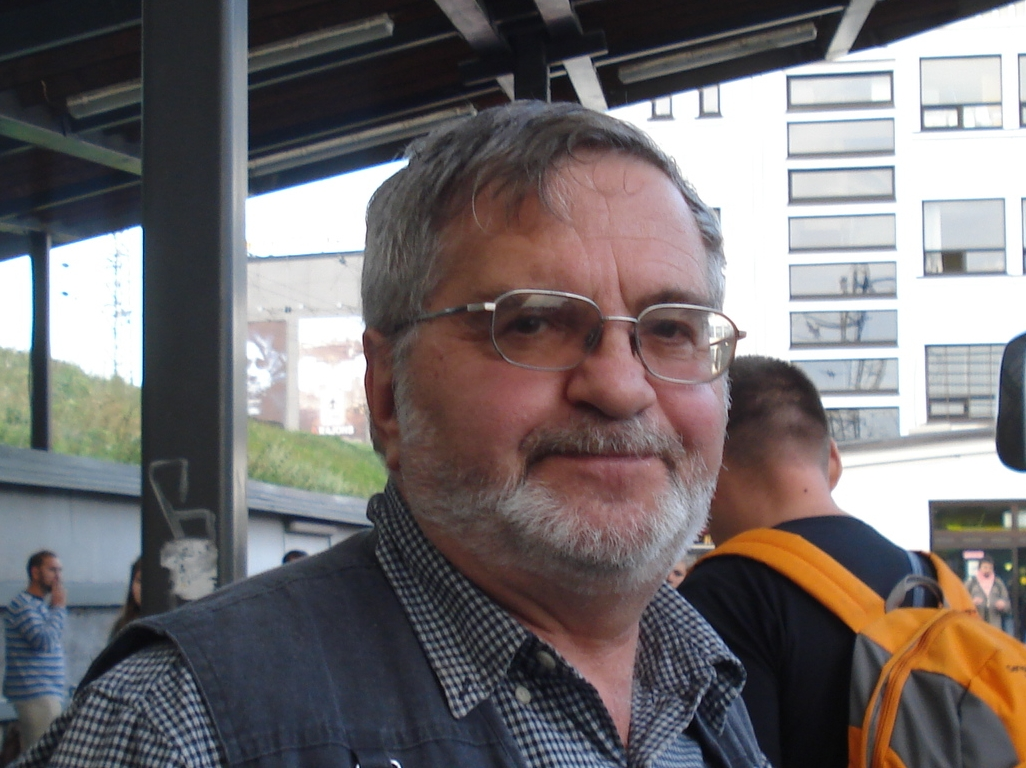
Timenchik in 2009

Roman Davidovich Timenchik (Russian: Рома́н Дави́дович Тиме́нчик, Latvian: Romāns Timenčiks, Hebrew: רומן טימנצ'יק; born 3 December 1945) is a Soviet and Israeli literary critic and a researcher on Russian literature of the 20th century.

He studied at the Faculty of Philology of the University of Latvia. He participated in the seminars of Professor Juri Lotman at the University of Tartu, took part in the Summer School on secondary modeling systems. After graduating from university in 1967, he worked as the head of the literary section of the Riga Young Spectator's Theatre (1968–1991). From 1970 to 1989, he lectured on the history of Russian literature and theater at the Theater Faculty of the Jāzeps Vītols Latvian Academy of Music. In 1982, he defended his dissertation on "The Artistic Principles of Anna Akhmatova’s Pre-Revolutionary Poetry" at the University of Tartu. He has been the compiler and commentator of a number of publications on Anna Akhmatova, Ivan Bunin, Nikolay Gumilyov, Osip Mandelstam, Vladimir Nabokov, Vladimir Piast and a member of the editorial board and author of articles in the biographical dictionary "Russian Writers 1800–1917". From 1988 to 1991, he was a member of the editorial board of the publication "Literary Heritage".

In 1991, he moved to Israel. Since March 1991, he has been a professor at the Hebrew University of Jerusalem. As a visiting professor, he lectured at the University of California. One of the founders (1999) and a member of the editorial board of the "Jerusalem Journal". He is a member of the editorial board of Russian magazines "New Literary Review" and "New Russian Book".

In 2006, he was awarded the Andrei Bely Prize in the category "Humanitarian Studies" for the book "Anna Akhmatova in the 1960s" (М.; Toronto: Volodej Publishers; Toronto University Press, 2005).

His main area of research is the history of Acmeist poetry. His first scientific work "Toward an Analysis of A. Akhmatova's Poem without a Hero" was published as a student in the collection "Materials of the 22nd Scientific Conference" (Tartu, 1967). He studied the works of Akhmatova, Gumilyov, Mandelstam, Blok, Annensky and their literary and creative environment.

He also studied the works of Alexander Pushkin, Vladimir Nabokov, Joseph Brodsky. He is the author of many articles in literary magazines and collections of scientific articles, most of which are devoted to Russian poetry of the Silver Age.
