= 1959 New Year Honours =

British royal recognitions

The New Year Honours 1959 were appointments in many of the Commonwealth realms of Queen Elizabeth II to various orders and honours to reward and highlight good works by citizens of those countries. They were announced on 30 December 1958 to celebrate the year passed and mark the beginning of 1959.

The recipients of honours are displayed here as they were styled before their new honour, and arranged by honour, with classes (Knight, Knight Grand Cross, etc.) and then divisions (Military, Civil, etc.) as appropriate.

At this time, awards were still being made within the United Kingdom honours list on the advice of the premiers of Australian states. There was also a (federal) Australian honours list of awards made "on the advice of Her Majesty's Australian Ministers". The separate Australian honours system began in 1975.

== United Kingdom and Commonwealth ==
=== Baron ===
- Sir William Edward Rootes, GBE, chairman, Dollar Exports Council.
- Sir James Turner, President, National Farmers' Union, England and Wales.

=== Privy Councillor ===
- Cameron Fromanteel Cobbold, Governor of the Bank of England.
- The Honourable Sir Philip Albert Martin McBride, KCMG, Minister for Defence, Commonwealth of Australia, 1950–1958.

=== Baronet ===
- Colonel Sir (Robert) Godfrey Llewellyn, CB, CBE, MC, TD, DL, chairman, Organising Committee, British Empire and Commonwealth Games.
- Kenneth William Murray Pickthorn, MP, Member of Parliament for Cambridge University, 1935–1950, and for the Carlton Division of Nottinghamshire since 1950. Parliamentary Secretary, Ministry of Education, 1951–1954. For political and public services.

=== Knight Bachelor ===
- Cyril Wilson Black, DL, MP, Member of Parliament for Wimbledon since 1950. For political and public services in Surrey.
- Aynsley Vernon Bridgland, CBE. For political and public services.
- Aubrey Francis Burke, OBE, deputy chairman and managing director, de Havilland Aircraft Co. Ltd.
- Norman James Kerr Cadzow, VRD. For political services in Scotland.
- Colonel Lionel George Archer Cust, CBE, Secretary-General, Royal Commonwealth Society.
- Major-General Charles Anderson Lane Dunphie, CB, CBE, DSO, managing director, Vickers, Ltd.
- Professor Alexander William Gordon Ewing, Director, Department of Education of the Deaf, University of Manchester.
- Ian Anderson Johnson-Gilbert, CBE, Lord Provost of Edinburgh.
- Clifford Frederic Gothard, OBE, JP. For political and public services in Burton-on-Trent.
- Alec Guinness, CBE, Actor.
- Henry Roy Forbes Harrod, Economist.
- Colonel Joseph Henry Haygarth, CBE. For political and public services in Middlesex.
- Alderman Isaac James Hayward, JP, Leader of the London County Council.
- Edward Milner Holland, CBE, QC, Chairman of the Bar Council. Attorney-General, Duchy of Lancaster.
- Hubert Hull, CBE, President of the Transport Tribunal.
- Anthony Richard Hurd, MP, Member of Parliament for Newbury since 1945. For political and public services.
- John William Laing, CBE, President, John Laing & Son, Ltd.
- Reginald Patrick Linstead, CBE, Rector, Imperial College of Science and Technology, University of London.
- Robert Owen Lloyd, OBE. For political and public services in Birkenhead.
- Douglas William Logan, Principal of the University of London.
- Ian Duff Lyle, DSC. For political services.
- James Allan Milne, CBE, chairman and managing director, J. Samuel White & Co., Ltd. President, Shipbuilding Conference.
- Air Commodore Henry Percy Smyth-Osbourne, CMG, CBE, JP, DL. For political and public services in Devon.
- Edward Julian Pode, JP, managing director, Steel Company of Wales Ltd.
- Kelvin Tallent Spencer, CBE, MC, Chief Scientist, Ministry of Power.
- William Edmund Sykes, MC, JP, Member of the Court of Common Council, City of London.
- Arthur Peregrine Thomson, MC, MD, FRCP, Professor of Therapeutics and Dean of the Medical School, University of Birmingham.
- Alderman Walter Ward, CBE, JP, chairman, Wool Textile Delegation.
- Thomas Yates, CBE General Secretary, National Union of Seamen.

State of South Australia

- Tom Elder Barr Smith, a prominent pastoralist in the State of South Australia. For public services.

State of Victoria

- The Honourable Gordon Stewart McArthur, President of the Legislative Council, State of Victoria.
- Arthur Tennyson Smithers, CBE, Director of Finance, State of Victoria.

Commonwealth Relations

- James Beveridge Thomson, Chief Justice, Federation of Malaya.

Overseas Territories

- Ronald Ernest German, CMG, lately Postmaster-General, East African Posts and Telecommunications Administration.
- Stuart Gillett, CMG, lately chairman, Tanganyika Agricultural Corporation.
- Stanley Eugene Gomes, Chief Justice, Trinidad and Tobago.
- Orlando Peter Gunning, CMG, lately Deputy Governor of the Eastern Region of Nigeria.
- Robert Lucien Morrison Kirkwood. For public services in The West Indies.
- Milton Augustus Strieby Margai, MBE, MB, BS, Premier of Sierra Leone.
- James Mitchell, CBE. For public services in North Borneo.
- Roland Theodore Symonette. For public services in the Bahamas.
- Thomas Crowe Spenser Wilkinson, Chief Justice, Nyasaland.

=== Order of the Bath ===
==== Knight Grand Cross of the Order of the Bath (GCB) ====
Military Division

- General Sir Dudley Ward, KCB, KBE, DSO, ADC (General), (41238), late Infantry Colonel Commandant, Corps of Royal Electrical and Mechanical Engineers.
- Air Chief Marshal Sir George Holroyd Mills, KCB, DFC, ADC, Royal Air Force.

==== Knight Commander of the Order of the Bath (KCB) ====
Military Division

Royal Navy

- Vice-Admiral Alexander Noel Campbell Bingley, CB, OBE.
- Vice-Admiral Robert Dymock Watson, CB, CBE.

Army

- Lieutenant-General Michael Montgomerie Alston Roberts West, CB, DSO, (33582), late Infantry.

Royal Air Force

- Air Marshal Walter Hugh Merton, CB, OBE.
- Acting Air Marshal William Mary Laurence MacDonald, CB, CBE, DFC.

Civil Division

- Philip Dennis Proctor, CB, Permanent Secretary, Ministry of Power.

==== Companion of the Order of the Bath (CB) ====
Military Division

Royal Navy

- Rear-Admiral Varyl Cargill Begg, DSO, DSC.
- Rear-Admiral Kenneth St Barbe Collins, OBE, DSC.
- Rear-Admiral Nicholas Alfred Copeman, DSC.
- Rear-Admiral John Lee-Barber, DSO.
- Major-General Reginald William Madoc, DSO, OBE, Royal Marines.
- Rear-Admiral George Anthony Francis Norfolk, DSO.
- Major-General Ian Hurry Riches, DSO, Royal Marines.
- Rear-Admiral Reginald Thomas Sandars.
- Rear-Admiral Bertram Wilfrid Taylor, DSC.
- Rear-Admiral Michael Southcote Townsend, DSO, OBE, DSC.

Army

- Major-General Roland Anthony Bennett, QHP, MD, FRCP (Edin.), (31401), late Royal Army Medical Corps.
- Major-General Laurence Francis de Vic Carey, CBE, (27904), late Corps of Royal Engineers.
- Major-General Samuel Moore-Coulson, ERD, (47984), late Royal Army Educational Corps.
- Major-General Richard Walter Craddock, CBE, DSO, (47540), late Infantry.
- Major-General Harold Cecil William Eking, CBE, DSO, (27911), late Corps of Royal Engineers.
- Major-General William Harrington Hulton-Harrop, DSO, (34623), late Infantry.
- Major-General Leonard Hamilton Howard-Jones, CBE, (31824), Corps of Royal Electrical and Mechanical Engineers.
- Major-General George Charles Gordon-Lennox, CVO, DSO, (39276), late Foot Guards.
- Major-General Denis Stuart Scott O'Connor, CBE, (38415), late Royal Regiment of Artillery.
- Major-General William Francis Robert Turner, DSO, (39501), late Infantry.

Royal Air Force

- Acting Air Vice-Marshal Glynn Silyn-Roberts, CBE, AFC.
- Air Commodore Reginald Herbert Embleton Emson, CBE, AFC.
- Air Commodore William Donald James Michie.
- Air Commodore Melvin Kenneth Drowley Porter, CBE.
- Air Commodore Victor Henry Batten Roth, CBE.
- Air Commodore Stanley Charles Widdows, DFC, (Retired).
- Acting Air Commodore Hughie Idwal Edwards, VC, DSO, OBE, DFC.

Civil Division

- Matthew Campbell, Secretary, Department of Agriculture for Scotland.
- Charles Harold Chorley, Parliamentary Counsel.
- Air Commodore Allan Robert Churchman, DFC, DL, chairman, Territorial and Auxiliary Forces Association, Belfast.
- Michael Magnus Vere Custance, Deputy Secretary, Ministry of Transport and Civil Aviation.
- Denis William Dobson, OBE, Deputy Clerk of the Crown in Chancery, Lord Chancellor's Office.
- John Euston Bell Finlay, OBE, TD, Commissioner and Director of Establishments and Organisation, Board of Customs and Excise.
- William Brian Littler, Director-General, Scientific Research (Munitions), Ministry of Supply.
- Colonel Donald McMillan, OBE, Director, External Telecommunications, General Post Office.
- Antony Alexander Part, MBE, Under-secretary, Ministry of Education.
- Cyril Woods Sanders, Under-Secretary, Board of Trade.
- Joseph Whiteley Stork, CBE, Director of Studies, Britannia Royal Naval College, Dartmouth.
- Gerald Saumarez Whittuck, Assistant Under-Secretary of State, Air Ministry.
- Sir Ronald Evelyn Leslie Wingate, Bt, CMG, CIE, OBE, lately Commissioner and chairman, Tripartite Commission for the Restitution of Monetary Gold.

=== Order of Merit (OM) ===
- Field Marshal the Right Honourable Harold Rupert Leofric George, Earl Alexander of Tunis, KG, GCB, GCMG, CSI, DSO, MC.

=== Order of Saint Michael and Saint George ===
==== Knight Grand Cross of the Order of St Michael and St George (GCMG) ====
- Sir Frank Godbould Lee, KCB, CMG, Permanent Secretary, Board of Trade.
- Sir Abraham Jeremy Raisman, GCIE, KCSI. For services to the Commonwealth.
- Sir Harold Anthony Caccia, KCMG, KCVO, Her Majesty's Ambassador Extraordinary and Plenipotentiary in Washington.

==== Knight Commander of the Order of St Michael and St George (KCMG) ====
- Guy Frederick Thorold, CMG, Economic Minister and Financial Adviser, Her Majesty's Embassy, Washington.
- The Honourable Robert Cosgrove, formerly Premier of the State of Tasmania.
- The Honourable Sir Roland Welensky, CMG, Prime Minister of the Federation of Rhodesia and Nyasaland.
- Sir Ralph Francis Alnwick Grey, KCVO, CMG, OBE, Deputy Governor-General, Federation of Nigeria.
- Charles Hepburn Johnston, CMG, Her Majesty's Ambassador Extraordinary and Plenipotentiary in Amman.
- Oscar Charles Morland, CMG, Her Majesty's Ambassador Extraordinary and Plenipotentiary (designate) in Tokyo.
- Major-General William Arthur Scott, CB, CBE, Director of Communications, Foreign Office.
- Charles Arthur Evelyn Shuckburgh, CB, CMG, lately Assistant Under-Secretary of State, Foreign Office.

==== Companion of the Order of St Michael and St George (CMG) ====
- Roland Cecil Cooke, CBE, Director, Exhibitions Division, Central Office of Information. For services in connection with the British Government Pavilion at the Universal and International Exhibition, Brussels.
- Samuel Frank Follett, Director-General, Ministry of Supply Staff, British Joint Services Mission, Washington.
- Thomas Harvey Searls, OBE, MC, lately Director, Universities and Adult Education Department, British Council.
- Clifford Waite, chairman and Joint Managing Director, Consolidated Tin Smelters, Ltd.
- The Honourable Geoffrey Ellman-Brown, OBE, formerly a Member of the Executive Council, Southern Rhodesia; at present representing the Government of Southern Rhodesia on the Board of Directors of the Rhodesian Iron & Steel Company.
- Alfred Howard Greenham, Agent-General and Trade Commissioner in London for the State of South Australia.
- Arthur Hugh Peters Humphrey, OBE, Secretary to the Treasury, Federation of Malaya.
- Edward Tom Stanley Pearce. For services to the sugar industry of the State of Queensland.
- Herbert Taylor. For public services in the State of Victoria.
- Simeon Olaosebikan Adebo, Permanent Secretary, Ministry of Finance, Western Region, Nigeria.
- Andrew Clarence Francis Armstrong, Permanent Secretary, Federation of Nigeria.
- Edmund Spencer Stanley Burrowes, Financial Secretary, Barbados.
- Norman Lace Corkill, MD, Health Adviser, Aden Protectorate.
- John Osbaldiston Field, Commissioner of the Cameroons.
- Louis Nathaniel Blache-Fraser, Federal Financial Secretary, The West Indies.
- Leonard Martin Heaney, Senior Provincial Commissioner, Tanganyika.
- Hugh Anthony Stephen Johnston, OBE, DFC, Permanent Secretary to the Premier, Northern Region, Nigeria.
- Patrick John Law, OBE, Labour Commissioner, Uganda.
- Thomas Edwin Letchworth, Administrative Officer, Northern Region, Nigeria.
- Christopher George Frederick Frampton Melmoth, Minister of Finance, Uganda.
- Norman Stewart Price, OBE, Provincial Commissioner, Northern Rhodesia.
- Arthur Frederick John Reddaway, OBE, Administrative Secretary, Cyprus.
- Amir Sha'Afal bin Shaif, Amir of Dhala, Western Aden Protectorate.
- Gerald Kennedy Nicholas Trevaskis, OBE, Adviser and British Agent, Western Aden Protectorate.
- Walter Joseph Durham Wadley, Director of Education, Kenya.
- Ferhley Douglas Webber, MC, TD, Assistant Secretary, Colonial, Office.
- John Mansfield Addis, Foreign Office.
- Beverley Gayer Barnard, Civil Air Attaché, Her Majesty's Embassy, Beirut.
- John Greville Stanley Beith, Counsellor, Her Majesty's Embassy, Paris.
- Thomas Brimelow, OBE, Foreign Office.
- John Richard Cotton, OBE, Counsellor (Commercial), Her Majesty's Embassy, Brussels.
- Frederic Francis Garner, Her Majesty's Ambassador Extraordinary and Plenipotentiary in Phnom Penh.
- Horace Frederick Alfred Gates, MBE, Her Majesty's Ambassador Extraordinary and Plenipotentiary in Managua.
- Richard Purdon Heppel, lately Minister, Her Majesty's Embassy, Vienna.
- Geoffrey William Kirk, Counsellor (Commercial), Her Majesty's Embassy, The Hague.
- Godfrey Martin Ellis Paulson, OBE, First Secretary, Her Majesty's Embassy, Beirut.
- Major-General Francis David Rome, CB, CBE, DSO, General Officer Commanding, British Sector, Berlin.
- Ian Dixon Scott, CIE, lately Counsellor, Her Majesty's Embassy, Beirut.

=== Royal Victorian Order ===
==== Knight Grand Cross of the Royal Victorian Order (GCVO) ====
- Sir Frederick Albert Minter, KCVO.

==== Knight Commander of the Royal Victorian Order (KCVO) ====
- John Wheeler Wheeler-Bennett, CMG, OBE.
- The Reverend Cyril Leonard Cresswell, CVO.
- Arthur Grant Harper, CVO, CBE.

==== Commander of the Royal Victorian Order (CVO) ====
- John Lovegrove Waldron.

==== Member of the Royal Victorian Order (MVO) ====
At this time the two lowest classes of the Royal Victorian Order were "Member (fourth class)" and "Member (fifth class)", both with post-nominals MVO. "Member (fourth class)" was renamed "Lieutenant" (LVO) from the 1985 New Year Honours onwards.

Fourth Class

- Commander William Noel Ash, Royal Navy.
- Arthur Bedford Knapp-Fisher.
- Ronald John Hill, MVO, MBE.
- Captain Terence Thornton Lewin, DSC, Royal Navy.
- Bernard Parkes, MVO.
- Anthea Secker.
- John Basil Stanier, TD.

Fifth Class

- Edward William Belcher, MBE.
- Squadron Leader Gerald Charles Delroy Goodyer, Royal Air Force.
- Dorothy Hutton.
- Alastair Stuart Laing.
- George Campbell Morrison.
- William Harry Rapley.
- William John Richards.
- Squadron Leader Brian Gerald Tivy Stanbridge, AFC, Royal Air Force.

=== Order of the British Empire ===
==== Knight Grand Cross of the Order of the British Empire (GBE) ====
Military Division

- Admiral Sir Frederick Robertson Parham, KCB, CBE, DSO.

Civil Division

- The Right Honourable James Gomer, Viscount Kemsley, chairman, Kemsley Newspapers, Ltd. For political and public services.
- Sir John Balfour, GCMG, Commissioner General for the United Kingdom, Brussels Universal and International Exhibition, 1958.

==== Dame Commander of the Order of the British Empire (DBE) ====
Civil Division

- The Honourable Ruth Burton Buckley, Alderman, East Sussex County Council. For public services in East Sussex.
- Rebecca West, CBE, (Cicily Andrews), Writer and Literary Critic.

==== Knight Commander of the Order of the British Empire (KBE) ====
Military Division

Royal Navy

- Vice-Admiral Arthur Reid Pedder, CB.
- Vice-Admiral Guy Bouchier Sayer, CB, DSC.

Army

- Lieutenant-General Richard George Collingwood, CB, CBE, DSO, (27169), late Infantry.
- Major-General Owen Patrick James Rooney, CB, CBE, (17894), Royal Army Pay Corps.

Royal Air Force

- Air Marshal Harold Douglas Jackman, CB, CBE.
- Acting Air Marshal Charles Edward Chilton, CB, CBE.

Civil Division

- George William Hoggan Gardner, CB, CBE, Director, Royal Aircraft Establishment, Farnborough, Ministry of Supply.
- Major Sir Jocelyn Morton Lucas, Bt, MC, MP, Member of Parliament for Portsmouth South since 1939. For political and public services.
- The Right Honourable Stormont Mancroft Samuel, Baron Mancroft, MBE, TD. A Lord-in-waiting and Government Whip, 1952–1954; Parliamentary Under-Secretary of State for the Home Department, 1954–1957; Parliamentary Secretary, Ministry of Defence, 1957; Minister without Portfolio, 1957–1958.
- Joseph Simpson, OBE, Commissioner of Police of the Metropolis.
- Sir (Thomas) George Wilson, Chairman of the Governors, West of Scotland Agricultural College.
- Albert Edwin Axon, Chancellor of the University of the State of Queensland. For public services.
- Alhaji Ahmadu, CBE, Sardauna of Sokoto. Premier of the Northern Region, Nigeria.
- Paramount Chief Mwanawina III, Paramount Chief of the Barotseland Protectorate, Northern Rhodesia.

Honorary Knight Commander

- Seyyid Abdulla bin Khalifa, CMG Heir Apparent, Sultanate of Zanzibar.

==== Commander of the Order of the British Empire (CBE) ====
Military Division

Royal Navy

- Captain Reginald William Armytage, AM, (Retired).
- Captain Frederick Dossor.
- Captain Sydney Alick Harrison-Smith, OBE, (Retired).
- Captain Arthur Francis Patrick Lewis.
- Surgeon Captain Charles Boyd Nicholson, MB, BS, (Retired).

Army

- Colonel George Willoughby Dunn, DSO, MC, TD, (65906), late Infantry, Territorial Army.
- The Reverend David Douglas Lloyd Evans, OBE, QHC, Chaplain to the Forces, First Class (62900), Royal Army Chaplains Department.
- Brigadier Donald Hardy Lyall-Grant (34435), late Royal Regiment of Artillery.
- Brigadier Richard Walton Hobson, OBE, (44876), late Royal Armoured Corps.
- Colonel (honorary) John Leslie Jones (389222), Army Cadet Force.
- Brigadier John Malcolm McNeill, MBE, ADC, (41179), late Royal Regiment of Artillery.
- Brigadier Hugh Scott Mitchell, ADC, (38736), Royal Army Ordnance Corps.
- Brigadier James Lennox Morton (47696), Corps of Royal Electrical and Mechanical Engineers.
- Brigadier (temporary) Robert Ballantine Muir (52021), late Corps of Royal Engineers.
- Brigadier (temporary) David Campbell Mullen, OBE, (44234), late Infantry.
- Colonel Charles Harold Arthur Olivier, OBE, (53625), late Royal Regiment of Artillery.
- Brigadier (temporary) Thomas Cecil Hook Pearson, DSO, OBE, (63639), late Infantry.
- Brigadier George Douglas Renny, DSO, (40655), late Infantry.
- Brigadier George Ernest Cluney Rossall, (32115), late Royal Army Service Corps.
- Brigadier (temporary) Dennis Herbert Tadman, DSO, OBE, (44196), late Infantry.
- Colonel Alistair Gordon Donald Whyte, MBE, MB, FRCS (Edin), (56558), late Royal Army Medical Corps.
- Colonel Percy Darrell Denman, OBE, (380309), late Royal Regiment of Artillery. Lately Commandant, Singapore Military Forces.

Royal Air Force

- Group Captain Charles Beresford Eaton Burt-Andrews.
- Group Captain Walter Henry Canniford.
- Group Captain Ralph Kennedy Cassels, DFC, AFC.
- Group Captain William George Devas, DFC, AFC.
- Group Captain Thomas James Hanlon.
- Group Captain Edward James Morris, DSO, DFC.
- Group Captain John Clifford Pope.
- Group Captain Frederick Charles Richardson, (Retired).
- Group Captain Eric Vincent Stokes.
- Group Captain Desmond Edwin Braddon Wheeler, DFC, (Retired).
- Group Captain Richard Delwyn Williams, DFC.

Civil Division

- Alderman Charles William Allison, OBE, JP, chairman, Tees Valley and Cleveland Water Board.
- Alderman Alwyn Joseph Alsop, JP. For political and public services in Darlington.
- Frank Douglas Arney, General Manager, Port of Bristol Authority.
- Herbert Arthur Ashdowne, Regional Director, North Western Region, General Post Office.
- Leslie Stuart Bibbings, Controller, War Pensions, Central Office, Ministry of Pensions and National Insurance.
- Thomas Robert Calthorpe Blofeld, chairman, Norfolk Agricultural Executive Committee.
- Horace Bottomley, General Manager, Ribble Motor Services, Ltd.
- Alderman Archer Robert Burton. For political and public services in the East Riding of Yorkshire.
- Alexander Douglas MacIndoe Cameron, JP. For political services in Bute and North Ayrshire.
- Brice Richard Clarke, MC, MD, Consulting Chest Physician, Northern Ireland Tuberculosis Authority.
- Stanley Edward Clotworthy, managing director, Northern Aluminium Co. Ltd.
- Maurice Cook, chairman, Metals Division, Imperial Chemical Industries, Ltd.
- Charles Edward Costin. For political services in Middlesex.
- Geoffrey Sandford Cox, MBE, Editor, Independent Television News, Ltd.
- Arthur Richards Culley, MD, Principal Medical Officer, Welsh Board, of Health.
- Ivan de Burgh Daly, lately Director, Institute of Animal Physiology, Babraham, Cambridge, Agricultural Research Council.
- Ernest Charles de Rougemont. For services to the Royal Air Force Benevolent Fund.
- John Cunningham Dougall, chairman, Education Committee, Perth and Kinross.
- John Cherry Drennan, JP, DL. For political and public services in County Londonderry.
- Langford Pannell Ellicott, Deputy Chief Technical Planner, Ministry of Housing and Local Government.
- Captain Norman Fawcett, HM Chief Inspector of Explosives, Home Office.
- Frank Charles Payers, Assistant Secretary, Air Ministry.
- James Finlay, chairman, Northern Ireland Fire Authority.
- Thomas Campbell Finlayson, chairman, Woodall-Duckham, Ltd.
- Paul Thomas Fletcher, Deputy Managing Director, Industrial Group Headquarters, Risley, Atomic Energy Authority.
- Uffa Fox, Yacht designer. For services to Yachting.
- Norman Frost, Chief Constable, Bristol City Police.
- Leslie James Gardner, OBE. For services in connection with the British Government Pavilion at the Universal and International Exhibition, Brussels.
- Thomas Glaister, JP, Alderman, Bolton County Borough Council, Lancashire.
- Peter Goldman. For political services.
- Alderman Norman William Gurney, JP, chairman, Buckinghamshire County Council.
- Alderman Clifford Alfred Harrison, OBE, JP, Member of National Savings Committee representing North-Eastern Region.
- Reginald Jack Hayward, RD, Member of the Court of Common Council, City of London.
- John Wyndham Pope-Hennessy, MBE. For services to the fine arts.
- John Edward Henshaw, lately Divisional Inspector of Mines and Quarries, West Midlands and Southern Division, Ministry of Power.
- Alderman Llewellyn Heycock, JP, chairman, Glamorgan Education Committee.
- Frank Alan Hoare, Joint Managing Director, Merton Park Studios, Ltd.
- Edward Watson Jones, OBE, Member, Agricultural Land Commission.
- George Carmichael Kelly, MD, QHP, Senior Administrative Medical Officer, South Western Regional Hospital Board.
- Thomas Arthur Kelly, Chief Officer, Liverpool Fire Brigade.
- Oskar Kokoschka, Artist and Writer.
- Charles Hamilton Latchford, Director-General of General Services, Ministry of Supply.
- Vernon Lawrence, OBE, Clerk of the Monmouthshire County Council.
- Stanley Charles Longhurst, JP, lately Forestry Commissioner.
- Austin Charles Longland, QC, Senior Referee under the Family Allowances and Contributory Pensions Acts.
- Robert Arthur Lovell, OBE, Chief Mechanical Engineer, Ministry of Transport and Civil Aviation.
- Hilda Victoria Emily Hart Lupton, MBE, Assistant Secretary, Board of Trade.
- Charles Malcolm MacInnes, emeritus Professor of Imperial History, University of Bristol.
- John George Mackay, chairman, Rustyfa, Ltd.
- George John Mackness, OBE, DSC, DL, chairman, Nottingham and District Disablement Advisory Committee.
- Lieutenant-Colonel George William Mansell. For political and public services in Dorset.
- Alfred Ernest Marrington, Assistant Secretary, Ministry of Education.
- Captain George Henry Mayhew, Commodore Master, RMS Pendennis Castle, Union-Castle Line.
- Robert Millar, Director of Greenwich Hospital, Admiralty.
- Edward David William Mills. For services in connection with the British Industry Pavilion at the Universal and International Exhibition, Brussels.
- Thomas Haig Moffat, OBE, chairman, St. Andrew's Ambulance Association.
- Walter Thomas James Morgan, Member, Biological Research Advisory Board, Ministry of Supply. Professor of Biochemistry, University of London.
- Leslie Taylor Morton, JP, Joint Managing Director, Messrs Clarke Chapman & Co. Ltd.
- Robert George Cockburn Nisbet, MBE, lately Assistant Secretary, Department of Agriculture for Scotland.
- James Bowman O'Neill, Assistant Secretary, Ministry of Home Affairs, Northern Ireland.
- Major Richard Alexander Oswald, MBE. For political and public services in Galloway.
- Ronald William Parker, chairman, Scottish Division, National Coal Board.
- Edwin John Victor Pasmore, Artist.
- Reginald John Pinder, managing director, Esso Petroleum Co. Ltd.
- Harold James Plenderleith, MC, Keeper, British Museum.
- Edward Eric Pochin, MD, FRCP, Director, Department of Clinical Research, University College Hospital Medical School, Medical Research Council.
- Thomas Edward Price. For political and public services in Staffordshire and Worcestershire.
- Charles Philip Quick, Assistant Secretary, Ministry of Agriculture, Fisheries and Food.
- John Ashworth Ratcliffe, OBE, chairman, Radar and Signals Advisory Board, Ministry of Supply Scientific Advisory Council.
- Haydn Oliver Reed, OBE, Chief Land Agent and Valuer, War Office.
- John Hayter Reed, managing director, Ericsson Telephones Ltd.
- George Walton Relph, Actor.
- James Maude Richards, Joint Editor, Architectural Review, Architectural Correspondent, The Times. Director, Architectural Press.
- Frederick Jean Paul Richter, OBE, Honorary Secretary, Anglo-Netherlands Society.
- Ralph Risk, MC, lately President, Law Society of Scotland.
- James Gumming Robertson, Attached War Office.
- Kenneth Robson, MD, FRCP, Civil Consultant in Medicine to the Royal Air Force.
- Doris Mary Druce Rosling, Assistant Secretary, Home Office.
- Reginald Herbert Schlotel, Director, Engine Research and Development, Ministry of Supply.
- Kenneth Graham Sillar, MC, Regional Controller, Northern Region, Board of Trade.
- Michael George Somes, Principal dancer in the Royal Ballet.
- Michael Frederick Cecil Standing, Controller, Programme Organisation (Sound), British Broadcasting Corporation.
- William Steedman, OBE, Principal Executive Officer, Foreign Office.
- Colonel Herbert Bland Stokes, MBE, chairman, Board of Governors, Bristol United Hospitals.
- James McWaters Storey, managing director, Dewrance & Co. Ltd.
- Thomas Rigby Taylor, JP. For political and public services in Hertfordshire.
- Harold Warris Thompson, Senior Regional Scientific Adviser for Civil Defence, Southern Region.
- Margery Alice Thornton. For political and public services in London.
- Alderman Percival John Mann Turner, JP. For political and public services in Sheffield.
- Richard Haynes Twining, lately Joint Deputy Chairman of the London Stock Exchange.
- William Henry Umfreville, ISO, lately Accountant and Comptroller General, Board of Inland Revenue.
- Stephen John Watson, Professor of Agriculture and Rural Economy, University of Edinburgh.
- The Reverend Leslie Dixon Weatherhead, Minister of the City Temple, London.
- Eric Davan Wetton, Registrar, HM Land Registry.
- George Hugh Winston Churchill, British subject resident in the Philippines.
- John Sebastian Somers Cocks, Her Majesty's Consul General, Munich.
- Robert William Palliser Dawson, DSO, lately Political Branch, British Military Government, Berlin.
- Maurice Murrowood Firth, First Secretary, Her Majesty's Embassy, Ankara.
- Alan David Francis, MVO, lately Her Majesty's Consul General, Oporto.
- Charles Alexander Gault, OBE, British Political Agent, Bahrain.
- Alfred Arthur Hamilton, British subject lately resident in Thailand.
- Barbara Salt, MBE, Counsellor, Her Majesty's Embassy, Tel Aviv.
- David Marwedel Archer. For services to the merino industry in the State of Queensland.
- Edith Lillian Bolte, of Meredith, State of Victoria. For social welfare services.
- Archibald Allan Henry Campbell. For services to the United Kingdom community in South India.
- Henry Patterson Carse, DSC, VD. For services to the United Kingdom community in East Pakistan.
- William Ellis Cox, MC, a senior legal practitioner in Hobart, State of Tasmania. For public services.
- Donald Victor Deane, CIE, OBE, formerly Mint Master, Calcutta, India.
- Charles Augustus Edward's, President of the Lawn Tennis Association in the State of Queensland.
- Patrick Harvey Devonsher Jackson, formerly a Senior Administrative Officer, Police Headquarters, Federation of Malaya.
- Alan Bruce Lilley, MB, ChM, formerly Chairman of the Hospitals Commission and, at present, medical director of the Cancer Council, State of New South Wales.
- Dugald Niven, OBE, in recognition of work on behalf of the National Free Library Service, Southern Rhodesia.
- Howard Macoun Sherrard, Commissioner, Department of Main Roads, State of New South Wales.
- Stanley Holm Watson, DSO, MC, ED. For services to transportation organisations in the State of South Australia.
- Alhaji Aliyu, OBE, Makama of Bida, Minister of Finance, Northern Region, Nigeria.
- John Bartholomew Atkinson, Commissioner of Police, North Borneo.
- Frank Stanley Blomfield, OBE, Head of Department (Class A), Stores, Office of the Crown Agents for Oversea Governments and Administrations.
- Philip Stanley Cassidy, chairman, Board of Governors, Hong Kong House, London.
- Alan Charles Walter Dixon. For public services in Nyasaland.
- Eyo Eyo Esua, MBE, General Secretary, Nigerian Union of Teachers.
- Lieutenant-Colonel Stanley George Ghersie, OBE. For public services in Kenya.
- Edward Rasheed Hanna, JP. For public services in Jamaica.
- John William Henderson, chief executive officer, Lagos Executive Development Board, Federation of Nigeria.
- Victor Theodore Hockin, Commissioner for Mines, Tanganyika.
- Cecil William Hodges, MBE, Controller and Auditor General, Kenya, and Auditor General, East Africa High Commission.
- Cecil Thomas Hutson, OBE, Chief Commercial Superintendent, East African Railways and Harbours Administration.
- Robert Cecil Conroy Jarrett, BEM, Commissioner of Police, Federation of Nigeria.
- John Robert Jones, MC, chairman, Public Services Commission, Hong Kong.
- Emile Fashole Luke, Puisne Judge, Sierra Leone.
- Lionel Alexander William Orr, QC, Attorney-General, Bahamas.
- Robert Redvers Follett-Smith. For public services in British Guiana.
- Albert Edward Spencer, MBE. For public services in Uganda.
- Charles Rex Stollmeyer, Commissioner in Canada for The West Indies, British Guiana and British Honduras.
- Ivan Lee Ward, Director of Water Development, Cyprus.

==== Officer of the Order of the British Empire (OBE) ====
Military Division

Royal Navy

- Commander William Henry Arnold, (Retired).
- Surgeon Commander Arthur Fawcett Miller Barron, VRD, MD, ChB, Royal Naval Volunteer Reserve (Retired).
- Acting Captain Merlin Bruce.
- Commander Geoffrey Russell Carver.
- Superintendent Margaret Ann Priscilla Cook, Women's Royal Naval Service.
- The Reverend John Arthur Coughlan, Chaplain.
- Commander William James Farrell, DSC.
- Instructor Commander Norman Fairfield Jenkins.
- Chief Engineer Officer David Cyril Leathley, Royal Fleet Auxiliary Service.
- Commander Thomas John Loosemore.
- Shipwright Lieutenant-Commander Walter Charles Edward McGinnes, MBE.
- Lieutenant-Colonel (Acting Brigadier) Robert Anthony Pigot, Royal Marines.

Army

- Lieutenant-Colonel Margaret Rosamond Appleby, TD, (192393), Women's Royal Army Corps, Territorial Army.
- Lieutenant-Colonel Reginald Peter Baily (58097), The Royal Lincolnshire Regiment.
- Lieutenant-Colonel (Brevet Colonel) Hugh Trefusis Brassey, MC, (66064), The Royal Wiltshire Yeomanry (Prince of Wales's Own) Royal Armoured Corps, Territorial Army (now T.A.R.O).
- Lieutenant-Colonel Duncan Maclachlan Carter-Campbell (50919), The Cameronians (Scottish Rifles).
- Lieutenant-Colonel John Edward Cordingley (69007), Royal Regiment of Artillery.
- Lieutenant-Colonel Basil Nevill Leslie Ditmas, MBE, (63419), Royal Regiment of Artillery.
- Lieutenant-Colonel Anthony Arthur Duncan (65410), Welsh Guards.
- Lieutenant-Colonel (acting) Robert Lawrence Eden, TD, (51361), Combined Cadet Force.
- Lieutenant-Colonel Thomas John Emerson, MBE, TD, (87163), Royal Army Service Corps, Territorial Army.
- Lieutenant-Colonel John Fairclough (67018), Royal Regiment of Artillery.
- Lieutenant-Colonel Patrick Walter Forbes (62658), The Gordon Highlanders.
- Lieutenant-Colonel (Brevet Colonel) Peter Walter Foster, MC, TD, (79731), Royal Regiment of Artillery, Territorial Army (now T.A.R.O).
- Lieutenant-Colonel Thomas Francis Chetwode Hamilton, MC, (52645), The Royal Northumberland Fusiliers (Employed List (1)) (now R.A.R.O).
- Lieutenant-Colonel (temporary) (now Major) Derek Owen Hogg (186967), The Royal Warwickshire Regiment (Employed List (3)).
- Lieutenant-Colonel Quentin Dacres Trower Hogg (58098), The Devonshire and Dorset Regiment (Employed List (1)).
- Lieutenant-Colonel Robert Adrian Humbert, TD, (79667), The Hertfordshire Regiment, Territorial Army.
- Lieutenant-Colonel (acting) Andrew Lawson Ingram (374568), Army Cadet Force.
- Lieutenant-Colonel Ivan Ronald Ferguson-Innes (138708), The Durham Light Infantry (Employed List (1)).
- Lieutenant-Colonel Frank Lawson John Jackson, TD, (78353), The North Staffordshire Regiment (The Prince of Wales's), Territorial Army (now T.A.R.O).
- Lieutenant-Colonel Charles Vaughan King (52652), The Devonshire and Dorset Regiment.
- Lieutenant-Colonel James John Lamb, MBE, TD, (178814), Royal Army Ordnance Corps, Territorial Army.
- Lieutenant-Colonel Robert Linton (58061), Royal Corps of Signals.
- Lieutenant-Colonel John Lewis Railton Metcalf (56710), The Royal Berkshire Regiment (Princess Charlotte of Wales's), Territorial Army.
- Lieutenant-Colonel (local) (now Major) Richard Harlackenden Carwardine Probert (210518), Royal Regiment of Artillery.
- Lieutenant-Colonel George Lee Ritchie, MB, DPH, (107964), Royal Army Medical Corps.
- Lieutenant-Colonel John Raymond Rodwell (44944), Royal Regiment of Artillery.
- Lieutenant-Colonel Harry Rogers (64647), The Royal Irish Fusiliers (Princess Victoria's).
- Lieutenant-Colonel John Edgar Rogerson, MC, TD, (289321), The Manchester Regiment, Territorial Army.
- Lieutenant-Colonel William George Sedgwick Rough (66070), Intelligence Corps, Territorial Army.
- Lieutenant-Colonel Ulric Vivian Smith (56656), Royal Army Service Corps.
- Lieutenant-Colonel Harry Thomas, BSc, (72233), Royal Army Educational Corps.
- Lieutenant-Colonel (temporary) Leslie Thurstan Tomes (66099), The Royal Warwickshire Regiment.
- Lieutenant-Colonel (temporary) John Turver (270168), Corps of Royal Engineers.
- Lieutenant-Colonel (local) (now Major) Peter George Tynan (198978), The Queen's Royal Irish Hussars, Royal Armoured Corps.
- Lieutenant-Colonel (now Colonel (temporary)) William Neville Curtis Waite (56703), 3rd East Anglian Regiment (16th/44th Foot).
- Lieutenant-Colonel (temporary) Paul Stanley Ward, MBE, (67956), The Royal Northumberland Fusiliers.
- Lieutenant-Colonel (temporary) Charles Wilkinson (30111), Corps of Royal Military Police.
- Lieutenant-Colonel (temporary) James Jarvis Wise (195508), Royal Army Ordnance Corps.
- Lieutenant-Colonel Henry Clements Withers, MC, (47651), Royal Regiment of Artillery.
- Lieutenant-Colonel Claude Percy Michael Worrall, MVO, (67115), Coldstream Guards (Employed List (1)).
- The Reverend John Ross Youens, MC, Chaplain to the Forces, Second Class (135241), Royal Army Chaplains Department.
- Lieutenant-Colonel (temporary) (now Major) Richard James Glynn Begbie, MBE, (95194), Corps of Royal Engineers (now R.A.R.O); formerly on loan to the Government of Pakistan.

Royal Air Force

- Acting Group Captain Alfred Stanley Knowles, AFC.
- Wing Commander Alexander Shelley Baker, DFC, (89788).
- Wing Commander William Kenneth Bell (46686).
- Wing Commander George Davidson (44034).
- Wing Commander Jack Eames, DFC, (81548).
- Wing Commander Norman Horace Gosden (120640), (Retired).
- Wing Commander Anthony Henry Hewitt (40391).
- Wing Commander Norman Edward Hext, MBE, (46003).
- Wing Commander Walter McRobbie, AFC, (83278).
- Wing Commander Edward William Merriman, MBE, DFM, (137289).
- Wing Commander Alfred James Morgan, AFC, AFM, (46334), (Retired).
- Wing Commander Harold Alfred Pritchard (57917).
- Wing Commander John Rushworth Pullan (21380).
- Wing Commander John Rayson, AFC, (49876).
- The Reverend William Graham Reeves.
- Wing Commander Joshua Kenneth Silver (75303), (Retired).
- Acting Wing Commander Wilton Legender Milburn (65119), Royal Air Force Volunteer Reserve (Training Branch).
- Squadron Leader Kenneth Dear, DFC, (129123).
- Squadron Leader Herbert Arthur Penny (139204).
- Squadron Leader Frank Erasmus Reed (100599), (Retired).

Civil Division

- George Frederick William Adams, Principal, Air Ministry.
- Duncan Hubert David Alexander, TD, DL, lately chairman, Empire Games Village Committee, British Empire and Commonwealth Games, 1958.
- Frederick John Anderson, DCM, lately Principal Regional Officer, Manchester Region, Ministry of Housing and Local Government.
- Gordon Anderson, MB, ChB, chairman, Birmingham No. 2 Medical Board.
- Stuart Pelham Anderson, MBE, Chief Clerk, Cabinet Office.
- Edward Ralph Ashill, Chief Officer, Hampshire Fire Brigade.
- Marjorie Kate Avery, Headmistress, Matthew Arnold Secondary School for Girls, Staines.
- Frank George Axmann, MBE, chief executive officer, County Courts Branch, Lord Chancellor's Office.
- Reginald Frederick Ballard, General Manager, Kolster-Brandes, Ltd., Sidcup, Kent.
- Arthur Bambrough, General Manager, Richard Garrett Engineering Works, Ltd., Leiston, Suffolk.
- Thomas Bancroft, Production and Works Director, Blackburn & General Aircraft, Ltd.
- Harry Barnes, lately Chief Constable, Blackpool Borough Police.
- John Barritt, deputy director of Research, Wool Industries Research Association.
- George Simpson Coupar Barron, JP. For political and public services in Fife.
- Commander Kenneth Lancelot Barrow, Royal Navy (Retired), Senior Chief Executive Officer, Foreign Office.
- William Charles Beach, Superintending Naval Store Officer, Admiralty.
- Leslie Beauchamp. For political services in Hampshire.
- James Bell, JP. For political services in County Down.
- Charles Winn Birdsall, Deputy Adviser on Public Relations to the Prime Minister.
- Alderman John William Blood, lately chairman, Rutland County Council.
- Ernest Robert Bowyer, JP, Director, H. D. Bowyer, Builders, Slough.
- Errington Brewis, Member of the Merchants' Consultative Committee.
- Irene Helen Bright. For political and public services in Maldon.
- Winston Brimacombe, chairman, Plymouth Local Savings Committee.
- Daniel Leslie Brown, assistant director of Engine Research and Development, Ministry of Supply.
- Arthur Robert Bugler, Constructor, HM Dockyard, Portsmouth.
- Royston Hawtrey Burnett, lately assistant director of Army Contracts, War Office.
- Group Captain John Bussey, lately assistant director (Air), Directorate of Overseas (Geodetic & Topographic) Surveys, Colonial Office.
- James Douglas Calder. For services to the Yacht and Boat building industry.
- Herbert Joseph Caradine, lately Grade 2 Officer, Ministry of Labour and National Service.
- Lionel Emmanuel Carine, Chief Purser, RMS Queen Elizabeth, Cunard Steamship Co. Ltd.
- Cowper Henderson Chalmers, Chief Food and Dairy Officer, Department of Health for Scotland.
- Stanley Chard, Superintendent, Grade "B", Royal Ordnance Factory, Glascoed, Near Usk, Monmouthshire.
- Dora Mildred Charlton, chairman, Women's Advisory Council on Solid Fuel.
- Charles Rupert Clay, chairman, Luton Industrial Savings Committee.
- Henry Angus Clidero, MC, Town Clerk, Bridgwater Borough Council.
- Nigel David Clive, MC, TD, First Secretary, HM Embassy, Tunis.
- Leonard Gordon Clugston. For political and public services in Lincolnshire.
- Barbara Coke, JP, Director, Junior Red Cross Department, National Headquarters, British Red Cross Society.
- Frank Stride Collins, MBE, chief executive officer, Prison Commission.
- Lettice Constant, MBE, attached War Office.
- Guthrie Stewart Cooper, Superintending Civil Engineer, Grade I, Air Ministry.
- Thomas Coote, JP, chairman, County Armagh Employment and Training Advisory Committee.
- Arthur Charles Corrall, Higher Collector, Board of Customs and Excise.
- Roland Walter Hayr Covell, lately President, National Federation of Meat Traders Associations.
- John Sydney Walter Cracknell, managing director, Watkins & Simpson, Ltd.
- James Henry Craine, Chief Clerk, Bow Street Magistrates' Court.
- Sonia Rosemary, The Honourable Mrs. Cubitt, lately County Superintendent (Nursing), Hampshire, St. John Ambulance Brigade.
- Clifford Ewart Culpin, Architect.
- Anthony Smith Curbishley, Accountant, Independent Television Authority.
- Arthur Dalby, HM Inspector of Schools, Ministry of Education.
- William John Lyon Dean, MB, ChB, JP, lately Provost of Lossiemouth.
- Dorothy Annie Denny, MBE, Grade 2 Officer, Branch B, Foreign Office.
- Beatrice Alberta Dickinson, JP. For political and public services in the West Riding of Yorkshire.
- Ernest Kemp Portman-Dixon, Chief of Restaurant Cars and Refreshment Rooms, Hotels and Catering Services, British Transport Commission.
- Frank Donachy, lately Scottish Organiser, National Union of Railwaymen.
- Robert Stewart Drummond, chief executive officer, General Post Office.
- Cyril Horace Eastop, MBE, chief executive officer, Air Ministry.
- Harold Eccles, MBE, MC, HM Senior Engineering Inspector of Factories, Ministry of Labour and National Service.
- Louis Essen, Senior Principal Scientific Officer, National Physical Laboratory, Department of Scientific and Industrial Research.
- Gwilym Evans, Senior Principal Scientific Officer, Welsh Plant Breeding Station, Aberystwyth.
- Frank Cook Everett, Principal Scientific Officer, Armaments Production Division, Ministry of Supply.
- David John Farrar, Chief Designer, Guided Weapons, Bristol Aircraft, Ltd.
- Thomas Ackary Farrimond, chairman, Lancashire Urban District Councils Association.
- Captain John Herbert Palmer-Felgate, Master, Tanker Esso Canterbury, Esso Petroleum Co. Ltd.
- Mary Leslie, Lady Gordon-Finlayson. For services to the Soldiers', Sailors' and Airmen's Families Association.
- Oliver George Robert Fox, MBE, chief executive officer, Public Record Office.
- Alexander Lickley Fraser, Dental Consultant, Queen Mary's (Roehampton) Hospital.
- Robert John Frizzell, General Manager, Northern Ireland Tourist Board.
- Gladys Evelyn Gates, Principal, Ministry of Pensions and National Insurance.
- Aileen Edith Pauline Gell. For political and public services in Derbyshire.
- Leonard Alfred Dick Glanville, Member, National Savings Assembly, representing City of London.
- Thomas Robert Charles Goff, Maker of Harpsichords.
- Charles Gorrod, Superintending Architect, Ministry of Works.
- Alan Graham, JP, chairman, Manchester Savings Committee.
- Joseph Graham, Principal District Officer, Marine Survey Office, North East District, Ministry of Transport and Civil Aviation.
- Alderman William Thomas Griffiths Vice-chairman, Carmarthen Territorial and Auxiliary Forces Association.
- Frederick Henry Grisewood, Broadcaster and Lecturer.
- Mary Eileen Halford. For services to Lawn Tennis.
- Denys Matthew Hall, JP. For political and public services in Kent.
- Captain Ralph Arthur Hanney, Master, MS Menestheus, Alfred Holt & Company.
- William Francis Winton Harding, Chief Horticultural Officer, Imperial War Graves Commission.
- Arnold Rainbird Harrison, Manager, Cable & Wireless, Ltd., Ascension Island.
- George Warrington Harvey, Principal, Ministry of Transport and Civil Aviation.
- Thomas John Hawkins, Alderman, Herefordshire County Council.
- John Morrison Hay, Senior Principal Scientific Officer, Research Establishment and Experimental Factory, Aberdeen, Ministry of Agriculture, Fisheries and Food.
- Stanley William Hayter, Artist and Engraver.
- George Hedley, Member, Scottish Agricultural Advisory Council.
- Humphrey Robert Hewer, Assistant Professor of Zoology, Imperial College of Science and Technology, University of London.
- Charles Vincent Hill, MC, lately Refining Adviser, British Petroleum Co. Ltd.
- Percy Lawrence Hobbs, chief executive officer, Ministry of Pensions and National Insurance.
- Colonel Alfred Cyril Whitworth Hobson, MC, TD, DL, chairman, Birmingham National Insurance Local Appeal Tribunal.
- Robert Albert Chester Holland, JP. For political and public services in Birmingham.
- John Joseph Hopkins, JP. For public services in Belfast.
- Lawrence John Hallam Horner, Assistant General Manager and Solicitor, Chamber of Shipping of the United Kingdom.
- Major Ernest Frederick Housden, MC, TD, Honorary Secretary and Honorary Treasurer, Imperial Cadet Association.
- John Turnbull Hughes, Director, British Information Services in India, Commonwealth Relations Office.
- Herbert Stanley Humphreys, MBE, lately deputy director of Contracts, Ministry of Supply.
- Lewis Jones Humphreys, JP, deputy chairman, Merioneth Agricultural Executive Committee.
- Alderman Frederick Tom Hussey. For public services in Hastings.
- Ethel Hutchison, chairman, Kirkcaldy Young Women's Christian Association.
- Edith Maud Winifred James. For political services.
- Charles Sydney Jenkins, lately Regional Director, North Midlands Region, Ministry of Power.
- Frederick Walter Jennings, managing director, Agricultural Mortgage Corporation, Ltd.
- Cecil John Cellan-Jones, MD, FRCS(Ed), TD, JP, DL, chairman, Swansea Disablement Advisory Committee.
- David Meurig Jones, Secretary, Family Service Units.
- Herbert Russell Jones, Telecommunications Controller, Wales and Border Counties, General Post Office.
- Albert King, Vice-chairman (Trade Union), East and West Ridings Regional Board for Industry.
- Sidney George King, lately Staff Controller, South-Western Region, General Post Office.
- John Wilson Kyle, MB, BCh. For services to Rugby Football in Northern Ireland.
- Sidney Clarence Lambert, Establishment Officer, Royal Mint.
- Coell Jack Lansdell, Designer, British Industry Pavilion, Universal and International Exhibition, Brussels.
- Henry William Liddell Lawson, Valuation Assessor, Ayrshire.
- Florence Eleanor Lea, Statistician, Ministry of Works.
- William Louis Lidbury, Regional Controller, National Assistance Board.
- James Herbert Lucas, Superintending Valuer, Board of Inland Revenue.
- David Alexander Lyttle, Principal Officer, Ministry of Health and Local Government, Northern Ireland.
- Philip McGrath, Senior Chief Executive Officer, HM Stationery Office.
- Edward Borough McGuire, Higher Collector, Board of Customs and Excise.
- Philip Whiteside Maclagan, MC, MD, General Medical Practitioner and Medical Officer of Health, Berwick.
- Melville George Malone, Senior Examiner, Patent Office, Board of Trade.
- Alderman John Mansfield, JP, chairman, Peterborough Joint Education Board.
- Marjorie Jane Marriott, Matron and Superintendent of Nurses, Middlesex Hospital Group.
- Bernard Mason, executive director and Joint Managing Director, the Winterbottom Book Cloth Group of Companies, Manchester.
- Samuel Medsforth, Secretary, Northern Advisory Council for Further Education.
- William Merrilees, Chief Constable, Lothians and Peebles Constabulary.
- John Middlemas, Air Traffic Control Officer, Grade I, Prestwick Airport, Ministry of Transport and Civil Aviation.
- Frederick Walter Mills. For political and public services in London.
- Herbert Charles Morgan, lately vice-chairman, Civil Service Benevolent Fund.
- John Hinds Morgan, lately chairman, Civil Defence Committee, Cardiff.
- Arthur Edward Morrison, managing director, Moore & Wright (Sheffield), Ltd.
- Stirling Craufurd Moss, Racing motorist.
- Ernest Ralph Cave Moy, MM, lately Expense Accounts Officer, HM Dockyard, Devonport.
- Peter William Mummery, Senior Principal Scientist, Reactor Division, Atomic Energy Research Establishment, Harwell.
- Alexander Neil, Headmaster, Motherwell Central Junior Secondary School.
- Alderman Guy Montague Nelson. For public services in Warwickshire.
- Lady Helen O'Brien, East Lothian County President, British Red Cross Society.
- Sheila Ann Ogilvie, Assistant Labour Adviser, Colonial Office.
- John Alfred O'Keefe, Chief Officer, Public Control Department, Middlesex County Council.
- Reginald Pickard, lately Clerk to the Sidmouth Urban District Council.
- Richard Norman Pilling, JP. For political and public services in the East Riding of Yorkshire.
- Cynthia Mary, Lady Carew Pole, County Organiser, Cornwall, Women's Voluntary Services.
- John Harold Rans, Senior Quantity Surveyor, War Office.
- James Ernest Reid, MBE, County Inspector, Royal Ulster Constabulary.
- Alfred Ritchie, Principal Scientific Officer, Scottish Home Department.
- Francis Calder Ford-Robertson, Director, Commonwealth Forestry Bureau.
- John Walter Robertson, JP, chairman, Ayr and District Local Employment Committee.
- Thomas Saunders Robertson, Principal Scientific Officer, Naval Construction Research Establishment, Admiralty.
- Charles Gordon Rowlands, Secretary, National Federation of Building Trades Employers.
- John Ridley Rowling, chairman, June Dairy Festival Committee.
- Stanley William Rumsam, Head of Operations, Newsroom, News Division, British Broadcasting Corporation.
- John Elvin Rusby, MC, TD, LMSSA, JP, General medical practitioner, Leeds.
- Guy Gurney Sangster, Secretary, Capital Issues Committee.
- Stanley Herbert Saville, President, English Hockey Association.
- James Shearer, Senior Partner, James Shearer & Annand, Architects, Dunfermline.
- Isaac Gibson Sim, lately Member of the Cumberland County Council.
- Edward Claude Sington, TD, Senior Legal Assistant, Board of Trade.
- The Reverend Robert Leonard Small, Member, Scottish Air Cadet Council, and Regional Chaplain, Air Training Corps, Scotland.
- Cynthia Alexandra, Lady Stewart, JP. For political and public services in Bedfordshire.
- Shirley Percival Stotter, lately Director, Fernhurst Research Station, Plant Protection, Ltd.
- Alderman Frank Swanton, lately deputy chairman, Wiltshire Agricultural Executive Committee.
- Lieutenant-Colonel Edward Roland Sword, Deputy Assistant Director, Ministry of Defence.
- Alderman Arthur Leslie Symonds, MBE, JP, chairman, Cambridge, Ely and District War Pensions Committee.
- Donald Eric Tanton, JP. For political and public services in Essex.
- Alexander Taylor, Senior Inspector of Taxes, Board of Inland Revenue.
- Major Philip Litherland Teed, deputy director, Department of Aeronautical Research and Development, Vickers-Armstrongs (Aircraft), Ltd., Weybridge.
- Harold Winsor Thompson, Regional Advisory Entomologist, Grade I, National Agricultural Advisory Service.
- Lancelot Fitzgerald Thompson, Governor, HM Prison, Belfast.
- George Ronald Tobitt, Director, Brown, Shipley & Co. Ltd.
- Edward Jack Toogood, Grade 2 Officer, Ministry of Labour and National Service.
- Roy George Townend, Manager, City of London Office, War Damage Commission and Central Land Board.
- Norman Sanger Tucker, General Secretary, National Council, Young Men's Christian Association.
- Albert Edward Turville, lately Ophthalmic Optician to the University of Birmingham Health Centre.
- Alderman Margaret Walkden, JP, Member, State Management Districts Council.
- Neville Warburton, JP. For political and public services in Lancashire.
- Alexander Baikie McKenzie Wares, chief executive officer, Civil Service Commission.
- Arthur George William Wash, Honorary Secretary, Council of the American Memorial Chapel Fund.
- Herman Weinberg, Member, Diamond Committee, Board of Customs and Excise.
- Edmund Frank Wheeler, Superintendent Engineer, Transmitters, British Broadcasting Corporation.
- Mena MacLeod Whigham, Member of Wages Councils.
- Frederick Charles White, Principal, Ministry of Agriculture, Fisheries and Food.
- Thomas Nellist Wilks, County Commissioner, Worcestershire, Boy Scouts Association.
- Henry Douglas Willcock, Principal Information Officer, Central Office of Information.
- Elsie Williamson, JP. For political and public services in Lancashire.
- Francis Henry Wilson. For political and public services in Liverpool.
- Paul Norman Wilson, DSC, JP, chairman, Kendal and District Local Employment Committee.
- Cecil James Wood, Principal, Ministry of Housing and Local Government.
- Hugh Nicholas Wood, managing director, Hugh Wood & Co. Ltd., Gateshead.
- John Stanley Woodrow, chairman, Reading Executive Savings Committee.
- Denis Sidney Stewart Wright, Founder and musical director, National Youth Brass Band.
- Cecil Henry Tross Youle, Secretary, Royal Naval Volunteer Reserve Club and Royal Naval Volunteer Reserve Officers' Association.
- John Still Bennett, Her Majesty's Consul, Khorramshahr.
- Harry Campbell Carrad, General Manager, Shell Petroleum Co. Ltd.., Austria.
- Charles Gilbert Dunbar Gray, British subject, resident in Brazil.
- Maurice Henry Norman, MBE, chairman, Education Committee, British Chamber of Commerce, France.
- John Joseph Joffre Page, lately General Manager, Basra Petroleum Company, Basra.
- Reginald Edmund Petley, MC, British subject resident in Argentina.
- Andrew Lancelot Pope, First Secretary, Her Majesty's Embassy, Bonn.
- Robert Stanley Porter, Principal Statistical Adviser and Economist, Middle East Development Division.
- Charles Leslie Pountney, British Consul, Concepción.
- Cyril Felix Rolo, First Secretary, Her Majesty's Embassy, Vienna.
- William Maurice Stout, lately Her Majesty's Consul, Porto Alegre.
- Norbert Collins Taylor, lately Manager, Salvador Railway Co. Ltd.., El Salvador.
- Norman Noel Tett, British Council Representative, Indonesia.
- Hubert Hessell Tiltman, Manchester Guardian Correspondent, Japan.
- Colonel William Edward Williams (Retd), British Vice Consul, Detroit.
- Annie Doris Wilson, MB, ChB, Physician, Edinburgh Medical Missionary Society Hospital, Nazareth.
- Joyce Agnes Wright, Director, Press Section, British Information Services, New York.
- Peter St. Clair Ballenden, Director of Public Works, Swaziland.
- Howard Barrett. For services to the Royal Children's Hospital, Melbourne, State of Victoria.
- Norman Briggs. For services to the United Kingdom community in India.
- Colonel Alexander Christie, MBE. For services to the St. John Ambulance Brigade in the State of Victoria.
- Graham Foster Clark, Town Clerk, Umtali, Southern Rhodesia.
- Malcolm Graham Cooke, General Manager, Government Insurance Office, State of New South Wales.
- Janet Pierson Cooper, Mayor of South Melbourne, State of Victoria.
- Thomas Malcolm Crisp. For services to the community of the North West Coast, particularly of Burnie, State of Tasmania.
- Dorothy Crouch. For services to the Red Cross Society and other charities in the State of Queensland.
- Peter Roylance Delamothe, MB, in recognition of services rendered to the Town of Bowen, State of Queensland.
- Evelyn Temple Emmett. For services to the tourist movement in the State of Tasmania.
- Walter Pemberton Fooks, Deputy Chief Commissioner of the Boy Scout movement in the State of South Australia.
- Alfred Edward John Fox, Town Clerk of Parkes, State of New South Wales.
- James Gardiner, Director of Education, Bechuanaland Protectorate.
- The Honourable Humphrey Vicary Gibbs, a prominent rancher in Matabeleland, Southern Rhodesia. For public services.
- Arthur Leslie Hare, a member of the Morwell Shire Council, State of Victoria, for many years.
- Arthur Robert William Littlewood Jones, Under Secretary and Permanent Head of the Department of Lands, State of New South Wales.
- Althole Stephen Horsford Kemp, MBE, Deputy Secretary, Prime Minister's Department, Federation of Malaya.
- Erik Langker, of Wollstonecraft, State of New South Wales. For services to the Arts.
- Ruby Beatrice Litchfield, of Adelaide, State of South Australia. For social welfare services.
- Mary Veta Macghey, Principal of the Adelaide Girls' High School, State of South Australia.
- John Crawford Martin, Secretary for Finance and Development, Swaziland.
- Alan Leslie Morse, an Alderman of Bathurst Municipal Council, State of New South Wales.
- Colonel Jack Keith Murray, of Brisbane, State of Queensland. For public services.
- Henry Corie Murrells, Tropical Manager of the Witwatersrand Native Labour Association at Francistown, Bechuanaland Protectorate.
- Maxwell Norman Oxford, Director of Civil Aviation, Federation of Malaya.
- Sydney Charles Parker, Provincial Native Commissioner, Matabeleland, Southern Rhodesia.
- Ivan Lloyd Phillips, Secretary to the Ministry of the Interior and Justice, Federation of Malaya.
- Roy Darrell Stuckey, Town Clerk of Hunter's Hill, Sydney, State of New South Wales.
- Henry Monnington Jameson Underhay, Treasurer and Collector of Income Tax, Swaziland.
- John Wilfrid Whitaker, Director of the Central Mining Research Station, Dhanbad, Bihar, India.
- Mikis Sawa Agrotis, Official Receiver and Registrar, Cyprus.
- Colin Hamilton Allan, Administrative Officer (Class A), Western Pacific.
- Hugh Bromfield Barclay. For public services in Kenya.
- Dandago Bello, Sarkin Dawaki Mai Tuta, District Head, Gwarzo District, Northern Region, Nigeria.
- John Bridgett, Accountant-General, Eastern Region, Nigeria.
- Laurence Alexander Cockburn Buchanan, deputy director of Education, Nyasaland.
- Maurice Ailwyn Byer, MB, ChB, Director of Medical Services, Barbados.
- David Alexander Cannon, MB, ChB, Senior Specialist (Pathologist), Federation of Nigeria.
- Hugh Adonis Marshall Clarke, Senior Education Officer, Sierra Leone.
- Jack Bracher Davies. For public services in the Northern Region, Nigeria.
- Craig Reid Cantlie Donald, Secretary to the Treasury, Uganda.
- Arthur Percival Evans, Deputy Chief Mechanical Engineer, Office of the Crown Agents for Oversea Governments and Administrations.
- Vernon Roy Evans, Director of Music, Ministry of Education and Culture, Trinidad.
- John Neil Falvey. For public services in Fiji.
- Jack Harley. For public services in Aden.
- Tom Harnett Harrisson, DSO, Government Curator and Ethnologist, Sarawak.
- Joseph Frederick Moles Heaney, chief executive officer, Education Department, Eastern Region, Nigeria.
- Colin de Neufville Hill, Secretary for Finance, Tanganyika.
- William Francis John Hobbs, Government Printer, Northern Rhodesia.
- John Derrick Watson Hughes, Permanent Secretary, Sierra Leone.
- Colin Hunter, Director of Audit, Sarawak.
- Wilfred Ebenezer Jacobs, Attorney-General, Leeward Islands.
- Audrey Jeffers, MBE. For public services in Trinidad.
- Eric Ronald Johnson, MBE, Assistant Adviser, Western Aden Protectorate.
- Khoo Peng Loong. For public services in Sarawak.
- Kenneth James Knaggs, lately Secretary to the Government, Seychelles, now Administrative Officer, Northern Rhodesia.
- Kwan Cho-Yiu. For public services in Hong Kong.
- Kwan Pak Chien. For public services in Singapore.
- Ravmond Lange. For public services in Trinidad.
- Archdeacon Samuel Vincent Latunde. For public services in the Western Region, Nigeria.
- Thomas Philip Lecky, Director, Animal Husbandry Division, Department of Agriculture, Jamaica.
- The Very Reverend Henry Morgan Lloyd, DSO, Dean of Gibraltar.
- Beryl McBurnie. For cultural services in The West Indies.
- Ian Alexander McGregor, Director, Medical Research Council Laboratories, Fajara, Gambia.
- Denis Owen Mathews. For public services in East Africa.
- Ramakart Jajerilal Mehta. For public services in Uganda.
- Graham Brownrigg Moss, Senior District Officer, Uganda.
- Robert Patrick, deputy chairman, Civil Service Commission, Kenya.
- Arthur Michell Pollard, Dental Surgeon to the Government, Zanzibar.
- James Isaac Ramphal, Commissioner of Labour, British Guiana.
- Ralph Murrell Rich. For public services in Northern Rhodesia.
- Robert Anthony Robinson, Professor of Chemistry, University of Malaya.
- Moustafa Fuad Sami, Education Officer, Class I, Cyprus.
- Frederick Shanks, Commissioner of Rating and Valuation, Hong Kong.
- Donald Arthur Shepherd, Deputy Financial Secretary, Cyprus.
- Trevor Miles Stevens, lately Secretary, City Council, Singapore.
- Thomas Davidson Thomson, Senior District Commissioner, Nyasaland.
- John Alexander Thorpe. For public services in St. Helena.
- Harry Everard Turner. For public services in British Guiana.
- Lieutenant-Colonel Herbert Stanley Weston. For public services in Tanganyika.
- Edwin Peter Littlefear Wilders, Director of Public Works, Somaliland.
- Keith Osborne Williams, Assistant Principal, Ibadan Branch College of the Nigerian College of Arts, Science and Technology.
- Dorothy Mabel Wolfe, lately Principal Matron, Northern Region, Nigeria.

==== Member of the Order of the British Empire (MBE) ====
Military Division

Royal Navy

- Captain Michael Edward Borg Banks, Royal Marines.
- Temporary Lieutenant-Commander John William Barrett, Royal Naval Volunteer Reserve.
- Lieutenant-Commander John Geoffrey Brookes, DSC.
- Engineer Lieutenant-Commander William John Deacon.
- Lieutenant-Commander Anthony James Raymond Foster, DSC.
- Temporary Lieutenant-Commander (Sp.) Allan Arthur Gotelee, DSC, Royal Naval Volunteer Reserve.
- Lieutenant-Commander Charles Roger Heaton.
- Lieutenant (S.D.) Stuart Royston Honour.
- Lieutenant-Commander William Herbert Jemphrey.
- Lieutenant-Commander Gilbert Charles Joseph Knight, DFC.
- Instructor Lieutenant-Commander Robert Henderson Morgan.
- Commander Norman Perrett.
- Lieutenant-Commander Charles Edward Mytton Thornycroft.

Army

- Major (temporary) Thomas Adams (384766), Corps of Royal Electrical and Mechanical Engineers.
- 6391134 Warrant Officer Class II William George Alce, The Royal Sussex Regiment, Territorial Army.
- S/11761 Warrant Officer Class I Wallace Bartlett, Royal Army Service Corps.
- 1985031 Warrant Officer Class II Gerald Joseph Bibby, MM, Corps of Royal Engineers.
- Major William Ellis Black (180397), Royal Regiment of Artillery.
- Major Francis Hugh Briggs Boshell, DSO, (112813), The Royal Berkshire Regiment (Princess Charlotte of Wales's).
- Major John Norman Burrell (249741), Royal Corps of Signals.
- 7689939 Warrant Officer Class II Thomas Sheridan Cameron, Corps of Royal Military Police.
- 886175 Warrant Officer Class I Harry Campkin, Royal Regiment of Artillery.
- Captain Charles James Carlton, TD, (175022), Corps of Royal Engineers, Territorial Army.
- 4193042 Warrant Officer Class II William Edward Glutton, Royal Army Ordnance Corps.
- Major Harold Arthur Cobden (249319), Royal Tank Regiment, Royal Armoured Corps.
- Major William Peter Cox, MC, TD, (182367), The King's Shropshire Light Infantry, Territorial Army.
- Major Brian Devlin, MB, DPH, (252477), Royal Army Medical Corps.
- Major (temporary) Charles Edward Eberhardie, MC, (303313), The Parachute Regiment.
- S/4746809 Warrant Officer Class II Derek Arthur Edmunds, Royal Army Service Corps.
- Major Bernard Cyril Elgood (217497), Corps of Royal Engineers.
- 868432 Warrant Officer Class II Henry Reginald Elliott, Corps of Royal Electrical and Mechanical Engineers.
- Major Kenneth Maldwyn Ellis (406596), Corps of Royal Military Police, Territorial Army.
- Major James Reginald Carrington Elmslie (158920), Royal Tank Regiment, Royal Armoured Corps.
- Major Maurice Elson, TD, (74049), The Royal Hampshire Regiment, Territorial Army (now T.A.R.O).
- 7669821 Warrant Officer Class II Stanley Elton, Royal Army Pay Corps.
- Major Betty Fisher (211442), Women's Royal Army Corps, Territorial Army.
- Major Richard William Forsythe (188007), Royal Army Service Corps (Employed List (3)).
- Major Rebecca Elspeth Hardinge-Francis (230563), Women's Royal Army Corps, Territorial Army.
- 14900556 Warrant Officer Class I Harry Galpin, Royal Army Ordnance Corps.
- Major Herbert Samuel Gavourin, MB, MRCOG, (375656), Royal Army Medical Corps.
- Major John Douglas Gibbon, MC, (67147), The Border Regiment (now R.A.R.O).
- Major Terence Leslie Gossage (85668), The King's Own Yorkshire Light Infantry.
- Major Peter Leslie Pearce Gould (117329), The Middlesex Regiment (Duke of Cambridge's Own).
- Major Horace Arthur Hardy, MC, (199702), Royal Regiment of Artillery.
- Major (acting) Arnold Haythorne (272765), Combined Cadet Force.
- Major (Ordnance Executive Officer) Henry George Edmund Hearn (270479), Royal Army Ordnance Corps.
- Captain John Francis Hickey, LRCP(I), LRCS(I), (445093), Royal Army Medical Corps.
- Captain Walter Richard George Hutchings (359601), Corps of Royal Electrical and Mechanical Engineers.
- Major (acting) Walter Louis James (150305), Army Cadet Force.
- Major John Campbell Donne Jarrad (77605), The Royal Fusiliers (City of London Regiment).
- Major Richard Clement Paul Jefferies, (124516), The Royal Irish Fusiliers (Princess Victoria's).
- Major (Quartermaster) Cyril Edward Jordan, (358149), Royal Regiment of Artillery (Employed List (4)).
- Major (Quartermaster) James Dominick Keating (147235), The Worcestershire Regiment.
- Captain (temporary) James Joseph Keenan (428023), Corps of Royal Engineers.
- Major Richard Edgar Kiddle (130825), Royal Army Service Corps.
- Major (now Lieutenant-Colonel (local)) Leslie Gordon Lohan, TD, (65121), The Middlesex Regiment (Duke of Cambridge's Own) (Employed List (3)).
- 1422150 Warrant Officer Class II William Edward Melin, Royal Regiment of Artillery, Territorial Army.
- 2718877 Warrant Officer Class I Patrick Mercer, MM, Irish Guards.
- Major (Staff Paymaster, 2nd Class) Donald Wilfred Moore (221223), Royal Army Pay Corps.
- 3767765 Warrant Officer Class II John Joseph Moorse, The Liverpool Scottish, The Queen's Own Cameron Highlanders, Territorial Army.
- Major (Quartermaster) John Gumming Nealon (266336), The Royal Scots (The Royal Regiment).
- Major John Frederick Dixon-Nuttall (380648), Royal Regiment of Artillery.
- Major John Patrick Oram Orr, TD, (64257), Royal Regiment of Artillery.
- Major James Frederick Herbert Pearcey, TD, (150777), Royal Corps of Signals, Territorial Army.
- Major Joseph Graham Pilsbury, MC, (224103), 10th Royal Hussars (Prince of Wales's Own).
- Captain John Jerrett Plain (327346), Royal Armoured Corps (Employed List (3)).
- Major Gordon Basil Pownall (380014), The Cheshire Regiment.
- Captain Laurence George Cormack Reid (425397), Royal Regiment of Artillery, Territorial Army.
- 840900 Warrant Officer Class I Edward Henry Reilly, Royal Regiment of Artillery.
- Major John Richard Roden (285838), The Wiltshire Regiment (Duke of Edinburgh's).
- Major Bertram Francis Louis Rooney (405272), 7th Gurkha Rifles.
- Major (Quartermaster) John Ross, TD, (223466), Royal Army Medical Corps, Territorial Army.
- Major (Director of Music) Wilfred Bruce Salmon, LRAM, ARCM, (111645), Royal Regiment of Artillery.
- Major (honorary) Ernest Symonds Shephard, MM, TD, (159056), lately Combined Cadet Force.
- 7582104 Warrant Officer Class I George Smith, Royal Army Ordnance Corps, Territorial Army.
- Major Alan Charles Llewellyn Sperling, MC, MA, (176020), Royal Army Educational Corps.
- Major Alan Wolryche Stansfeld (65209), The York and Lancaster Regiment.
- Major Alexander Stewart (305838), Royal Malta Artillery.
- ER/2716550 Warrant Officer Class I Gerald Stone, Irish Guards.
- 21004046 Warrant Officer Class II Andrew Alfred Street, Corps of Royal Engineers, Territorial Army.
- Captain (Quartermaster) William George Swanson (414598), The East Surrey Regiment (seconded to Nigerian Military Forces).
- Major (District Officer) Stanley Edwin Toghill (137666), Royal Regiment of Artillery (Employed List (2X)).
- Major Terence Michael Troy (384047), The Royal Inniskilling Fusiliers.
- Major William Anthony Vinycomb, MC, (62542), Corps of Royal Engineers.
- 890350 Warrant Officer Class II Richard Vivian Wall, The Royal Northumberland Fusiliers, Territorial Army.
- Major (Staff Quartermaster) Claud William Weston (233983), Employed List 2.
- W/56505 Warrant Officer Class I Margaret Irene Williams, Women's Royal Army Corps.
- S/22303138 Warrant Officer Class I Ralph Williams, Royal Army Service Corps.
- Major Douglas Stewart Wooles (352374), Royal Army Service Corps.
- Major Hugh Henry Gordon Woolford (216760), Corps of Royal Electrical and Mechanical Engineers.
- Major William Joseph Mason (302682), Corps of Royal Engineers (now R.A.R.O); formerly on loan to the Government of Pakistan.

Royal Air Force

- Wing Commander Percy Green (49856).
- Squadron Leader George Leonard Armstrong (143246).
- Squadron Leader John Reginald Dowling, DFC, AFC, (150185).
- Squadron Leader James Grant Duncan (136517).
- Squadron Leader Edgar Rupert George Haines, DFM, (185110).
- Squadron Leader John Leslie Purchase (145824).
- Squadron Leader Kelvin Sayers (63807).
- Squadron Leader Edwin Nicholson Stone (501032).
- Squadron Leader Charles Edward Gordon Tomkins (47165), (Retired).
- Squadron Leader John Whelan, AFC, (52561).
- Acting Squadron Leader Frederick Roy Eaton Hayter (189591), Royal Air Force Volunteer Reserve (Training Branch).
- Acting Squadron Leader Albert Edward Luff (115455), Royal Air Force Volunteer Reserve (Training Branch).
- Acting Squadron Leader Alexis Yates (31473).
- Flight Lieutenant Robert Andrew (177539).
- Flight Lieutenant Robert Armstrong (178888).
- Flight Officer Kathleen Enid Bagley (584), Women's Royal Auxiliary Air Force.
- Flight Lieutenant Maynard Blackburn (55282).
- Flight Lieutenant Edward James Blackwood (148119).
- Flight Lieutenant William David Fleet (46555).
- Flight Lieutenant Peter Hurst Gibson (504431), Royal Air Force Reserve of Officers.
- Flight Lieutenant Alan Robert Goss (2236576).
- Flight Lieutenant Donald William Greenslade, AFC, (1865893).
- Flight Lieutenant Charles Stuart Jackson (204002).
- Flight Lieutenant Cyril Jones (55559).
- Flight Lieutenant Dennis William Kill (52963).
- Flight Lieutenant Frederick Stanley Lacy (134186).
- Flight Lieutenant William Sparks (171298).
- Flight Lieutenant Raymond Frederick George Stagg (146778).
- Flight Lieutenant John Clifford Strickett (58897).
- Flight Lieutenant Francis William Thornton (199829), Royal Auxiliary Air Force.
- Flight Officer Constance Vera Toyne (8129), Women's Royal Air Force.
- Flight Lieutenant David John Whitton (197172).
- Flying Officer Thomas David Bastick Wilson (55955).
- Master Technician Leslie William Hedges (520756).
- Master Technician John James Jeremiah (614005).
- Master Technician Leonard Metcalfe (573796).
- Warrant Officer Philip Sydney Barnes (590647).
- Warrant Officer Frank Helm (518518).
- Warrant Officer John Edward Jones (590425).
- Warrant Officer Ronald Simpson (525870).
- Warrant Officer Brian Lewis Ewart Smith (591414).
- Warrant Officer Alfred Maurice Spence (516757).
- Warrant Officer Thomas William Ward (519397).
- Warrant Officer Percy Edward Warner (354991).
- Warrant Officer Leonard James White (562631).

Civil Division

- Lazarus Aaronson, Lecturer in Economics, City of London College.
- Inez Elizabeth Abbott, Secretary to the Director of External Broadcasting, British Broadcasting Corporation.
- Evelyn Violet Abel, assistant director, Hibbert House Services Clubs, Nicosia, Cyprus.
- Lieutenant-Colonel Henry Witherington Abey, TD, Deputy Civil Defence Controller Designate, South Shields.
- William Ainsworth, Superintendent and Deputy Chief Constable, Cambridge City Police.
- Edward Ambler, Senior Executive Officer, Ministry of Pensions and National Insurance.
- Major Stuart Hector Andrew, lately Retired Officer, Grade III, War Office, Captain of Invalids, Royal Hospital, Chelsea.
- Arthur Sam Andrews, Grade 4 Officer, Ministry of Labour and National Service.
- Henry William Ansell, Senior Executive Officer, Ministry of Works.
- George Henry Argent, Higher Executive Officer, Ministry of Agriculture, Fisheries and Food.
- Fred Atkinson, Honorary Secretary, Bradford Local Savings Committee.
- Thomas Aubrey Bailey, Senior Architect, Ministry of Works.
- John Baird, chairman, Rent Tribunals for Edinburgh, Lothians and Peebles.
- John Henry Ballantine, MM, Chief Supplies Superintendent, General Post Office.
- Commander Penrose Leicester Barcroft, Royal Navy (Retired), Intelligence Officer, Grade II, Ministry of Defence.
- Hannath David Barnes, Grade 4 Officer, Ministry of Labour and National Service.
- John Shawyer Barnes, Director and General Manager, Whites Shipyard (Southampton), Ltd.
- William Ernest Barnett. For services as Experimental Officer, British Museum (Natural History).
- Frederick William Barringer. For services to the British Legion.
- John Henry Baxter, Apprentice Training and Welfare Officer, Parsons Marine Steam Turbine Co. Ltd., Wallsend-on-Tyne.
- Elizabeth Stokes Beattie, Higher Executive Officer, Department of Health for Scotland.
- Charles Edward Bellairs. For political services.
- Bert Bissell, Probation Officer, Dudley, Worcestershire.
- Elizabeth Ellen Bixter. For political services in Lancashire.
- Mary Celine Veronica Bones, Matron, Town Hospital, St. Peter Port, Guernsey.
- Alexander Bowman, Dock Manager, Smith's Dock Co. Ltd., North Shields.
- Ronald John Bracey, lately Head, Optics Department, British Scientific Instrument Research Association.
- George Burnham Braithwaite, Grade B.II Officer, Government Communications Headquarters.
- Arthur George Brammer, District Secretary, Amalgamated Society of Woodworkers, North West Midlands District.
- Florence Broome. For political and public services in Derbyshire.
- John Bathgate Brotherston, Crown Estate Receiver, Scotland.
- John Conrad Brown, Harbour Engineer, Isle of Man.
- John Thompson Brown, chairman, Easingtqn Rural North Savings Committee.
- Charles Edward Browne, chairman, Daventry District Committee, Northampton Agricultural Executive Committee.
- Robert Whiteley Brownlow, JP. For public services in Melton Mowbray.
- David Buchan. For services to the study of herring.
- Ernest Edward Buck, Officer, Board of Customs and Excise.
- Nellie Dora Bull, lately Clerical Officer, Ministry of Education.
- Alderman Arthur Davis Burton Chairman, Benwick Internal Drainage Board, Cambridgeshire.
- John Oscar Ainsworth Bury. For services as Honorary Secretary, Darwen Savings Committee, Lancashire.
- Gilbert Alexander Cameron, lately Deputy Principal Officer, Ministry of Commerce, Northern Ireland.
- John Arthur MacLeod Cameron, Superintendent and Deputy Chief Constable, Ayr Burgh Police.
- Joseph Arthur Chambers, lately Local Fuel Overseer, Boston Borough Council.
- Francis Brewer Chapman, lately Senior Port Labour Officer, National Dock Labour Board, Port of Hull.
- Annie Hall Cheshire, Executive Officer, Scottish Savings Committee.
- Wallace Duncan Childs, Telecommunications Technical Officer, Grade I, Southern Division, Ministry of Transport and Civil Aviation.
- Edgar John Chipps, lately Executive Officer, War Office.
- Henry James Clark, MM, Higher Executive Officer, Board of Trade.
- John Charles Cliffe, Regional Coal Officer, London Region, Ministry of Power.
- Joseph Walter Henry Clisby, chairman, Parents and Friends Association, Edgware Sea Cadet Corps Unit.
- Harry Collings, Higher Executive Officer, Board of Inland Revenue.
- Arthur Collins, Higher Executive Officer, War Office.
- Arthur William Cooper, chairman, United London Workshops for the Blind (Sales), Ltd.
- Lieutenant-Colonel Loris Clyde Cooper, DSO, Civil Defence Officer, County of Northumberland.
- Norman Frederick Ward Cooper, Inspector of Taxes, Board of Inland Revenue.
- Alderman Edward Corrigan, District Secretary, Plumbing Trades Union, Northumberland and part of County Durham.
- Charles Orchard George Cosson, Experimental Officer, Ministry of Agriculture, Fisheries and Food.
- Margaret Eliza Crombie, lately Senior Clerk, Aberdeen Harbour Commissioners.
- Captain James Curley, MC, Honorary Secretary, Belfast Branch, British Legion.
- Percy George Curtis, News Information Officer, British Broadcasting Corporation.
- William Henry Dally, Chief Engineer and Supervisor, Aberthaw Cement Works, Glamorganshire.
- Anne Rees Lewis Davies, lately Senior Mistress, Pembroke Grammar School.
- William James Davies. For services to the Boys' Brigade Movement.
- Oswald Arthur Denly, Honorary National Chairman, Invalid Tricycle Association.
- Frederick Stephen Dennard, Technical, Grade I, Atomic Weapons Research Establishment, Aldermaston.
- Ernest Dennis, managing director, E. Dennis & Son, Ltd., Camelford.
- Albert Edward Denton, Works Manager, S. G. Brown, Ltd., Watford.
- Dorcas Dickson. For political and public services in County Down.
- John Scully Doherty, Inspector of Taxes, Board of Inland Revenue.
- James Shea Doke, Assistant Trade Commissioner, Trinidad.
- Thomas Dorgan, Group Scoutmaster 1st Hirst Group, Northumberland.
- William Alan Dotchin, Estate Manager, the Land Settlement Association, Ltd., Morpeth, Northumberland.
- Herbert Leslie Dove, Chief Draughtsman, Admiralty.
- Frederick George Dudley, Welfare Officer, Cars Branch, Morris Motors, Ltd.
- Olive Dunn. For services to children and old people in Cadishead, Irlam Urban District, Manchester.
- Hampton Edmund Dunseath, Higher Executive Officer, Savings Department, General Post Office.
- Captain Robert Tait Duthie, DSC, Harbourmaster, Fraserburgh.
- Thomas Harold Easman, Senior Professional Accountant, War Office.
- John Henry Ebbs Higher Executive Officer, Commonwealth Relations Office.
- Arthur William John Eckett, lately senior Executive Officer, War Office.
- John Whitfield Edwards, Senior Draughtsman, War Office.
- Leslie Edwards, Divisional Traffic Manager (Western Area), British Railways, Western Region.
- Jack Stanley Eggett. For political services.
- Adrian Claude Emery, Chief Draughtsman, Telecommunication Group, Plessey Co. Ltd., Ilford.
- Alice Evelyn Emsley, lately Company Secretary, Robinson & Peel, Ltd., Bradford.
- James Cooper Evans, JP, Area Production Manager, Marchon Products, Ltd.
- William Fannin, District Inspector, Royal Ulster Constabulary.
- Edgar Hackett Farley, Higher Executive Officer, British Museum.
- William Martin Farquhar, Chief Engineer, MV Ulster Prince, Belfast Steamship Co. Ltd.
- Albert Edward Moston Fenna, lately Local Fuel Overseer, Metropolitan Borough of Hackney and Stoke Newington.
- Geoffrey Finsberg. For political and public services.
- Kathleen Fisher. For political services in Midlothian and Edinburgh.
- Philippa Marjory Fisher, Registry Supervisor, British Broadcasting Corporation.
- Ralph Stuart Lycett Flemming. For political and public services in Wandsworth.
- Flight Lieutenant John Formby, Flight Commander, Meteorological Vertical Ascent Flight, Short Brothers & Harland, Ltd., RAF Woodvale.
- Alfred Morgan Francis, Headmaster, Featherby County Junior School, Gillingham, Kent.
- William Frank, Chief Engineer, Shell Tankers, Ltd.
- Arthur George Fulton, DCM. For services to Rifle Shooting.
- Joan Helen Furnival, Assistant, Home Division, Student Welfare (London) Department, British Council.
- James Gardner Secretary and Treasurer, Paisley Technical College.
- Ellen Garnett, Youth Organiser, Nottingham Local Education Authority.
- Leonard Gaskell, Organising Secretary, National Silk Workers' and Textile Trades' Association.
- Ernest Gault, Staff Officer, Ministry of Education, Northern Ireland.
- Herbert George Thomas Gee, JP, chairman, Shropshire War Pensions Committee.
- Isabella Gibb, Higher Executive Officer, Ministry of Pensions and National Insurance.
- Robert George Goodfellow, Senior Station Radio Officer, RAF Cheadle, Staffordshire.
- Jack Goodyear, Higher Executive Officer, London Airport, Ministry of Transport and Civil Aviation.
- Thomas Gourdie, Calligraphist Assistant Art Master, Kirkcaldy High School.
- John Graham, Chief Public Health Inspector, Manchester Corporation.
- Madge Elaine Graham. For political and public services in Newcastle upon Tyne.
- Leslie Arnold Grealey, Director, Frank W. Clifford, Ltd. For services in connection with the British Government Pavilion, Universal and International Exhibition, Brussels.
- Francis Green, Higher Executive Officer, Ministry of Transport and Civil Aviation.
- Jessie Lilian Green, Chief Superintendent of Typists, Commonwealth Relations Office.
- Arthur Greig, Assistant Secretary and Editor, Geological Society of London.
- George Frederick Rickard Grenyer, Station Radio Officer, Government Communications Headquarters.
- Madeleine Lucy Guays. For political and public services in Bedford.
- Arthur Harold Guiver, Superintending Technical Officer, Ministry of Works.
- David Geddes Gunn, Factor, Watten Estates, Caithness.
- Kathleen Haacke, Head, Programme Correspondence Section, British Broadcasting Corporation.
- William Thomas Hall, Personal Secretary to the Architect to the London County Council.
- Thomas Handy. For political services.
- George Amos Tudor Hanks, Higher Executive Officer, Scottish Education Department.
- Edward Walwyn Harrison, JP, chairman, Leek Local Employment Committee.
- Frank Hartley, Secretary, Civil Service Council for Further Education.
- Geoffrey Maurice Harvey, Projects Manager, Transair, Ltd.
- Major David Hay. For political services in Scotland.
- Daisy Winifred Hayward. For political and public services in Huntingdonshire.
- James Hedges, Member, Winchester District Committee, Hampshire Agricultural Executive Committee.
- Percy Hilder, lately Grade 4 Officer, Ministry of Labour and National Service.
- Brian Rochford Hislop, lately District Manager, Navy, Army and Air Force Institutes, Christmas Island.
- Ian Henry Hogg, A Senior Research Planning Officer, Research and Development Branch, Industrial Group Headquarters, United Kingdom Atomic Energy Authority, Risley.
- John Henry Holgate, chairman, District Committee, Lancashire Agricultural Executive Committee.
- Kenneth Lawrence Holland, Deputy Chief Officer, Lancashire Fire Brigade.
- Elsie Hooker, Governor, HM Borstal Institution, East Sutton Park, Maidstone.
- Alice Tamar Hopkinson, JP. For political and public services in Blackpool.
- Richard Henry Edward Hosking, Higher Executive Officer, Ministry of Transport and Civil Aviation.
- Edith Mary Howarth, Headmistress, Merrydale County Primary School (Infants), Leicester.
- Harriett Hughes. For political and public services in Merioneth.
- Agnes Rattray Ince. For political and public services in Leeds.
- Albert Edward Percy Irish, BEM, Senior Illustrator, Royal Air Force Staff College, Bracknell, Berkshire.
- Helen Barr Jack, Higher Executive Officer, Admiralty.
- Archibald Alfred Worner Jackson, Grade 4 Officer, Ministry of Labour and National Service.
- David Brynmor James, Senior Superintendent, Mercantile Marine Office, London, Ministry of Transport and Civil Aviation.
- William Henry Jarvis, Engineer-in-Charge, Independent Television Authority Transmitting Station, Bolton.
- Stanley Alec Jeanmond, Station Catering Superintendent, London Airport, British European Airways Corporation.
- John George Jessop, Chief Officer, Wolverhampton Fire Brigade.
- Mildred Joyce Jones, Ward Sister, Addenbrooke's Hospital, Cambridge.
- Phyllis Garnet Jones. For public and charitable services in Llanelly, Carmarthenshire.
- Matthew Edward Kavanagh, lately Clerical Officer, Ministry of Pensions and National Insurance.
- James Keating, Organising Secretary, Agricultural Workers' Northern Ireland Section, Amalgamated Transport and General Workers' Union.
- Francis William Keen, Higher Executive Officer, Ministry of Pensions and National Insurance.
- Frederick George Henry Kieft, Senior Assessor, War Damage Commission and Central Land Board.
- George William King, Senior Area Officer, Borstal Central After-Care Association.
- Jean Margaret Kirk, Senior Private Secretary, North of Scotland Hydro-Electric Board.
- Albert Charles Knight, Senior Executive Officer, Board of Customs and Excise.
- Charles James Knight, lately General Manager, South Suburban Co-operative Society, Ltd.
- James Knight, Deputy Naval Store Officer, Admiralty.
- Helen Marjory Dobree Knowling. For public services in Pembrokeshire.
- Zinaida Korentchevsky, Grade 3 Officer, Branch B, Foreign Office.
- Harold Reginald Lake, Night Superintendent, Moorhaven (Mental) Hospital, Ivybridge, Devonshire.
- Ethel Langham, Senior Head Teacher, County Supply Staff, Kesteven, Lincolnshire.
- Nancie Knox Coutts Langlands. For political services in Leith.
- Cyril Henry Frederick Barnes-Lawrence, lately Master, Britannia Royal Naval College, Dartmouth.
- John Rixon Lawrence, Administrative Assistant, Cwmbran Development Corporation.
- Sydney Herbert Lawrence. For services to the Lawrence Boys' Club, Lymington.
- Irene Lea. For political and public services in Cheshire.
- Ada Learoyd. For services to disabled people of Huddersfield and district.
- Doris Gertrude Lee, lately Senior Experimental Officer, Meteorological Office, Air Ministry.
- Herbert Leonard, chairman, Co-operative Societies Fuel Trade Association.
- Sidney Walter Lewington, lately Higher Executive Officer, Board of Customs and Excise.
- Amy Francis Lewis. For services to the Star and Garter Home for Disabled Sailors, Soldiers and Airmen, Richmond.
- Helen Lewis, Women's Welfare Officer, Appleby-Frodingham Steel Company, Scunthorpe.
- Lola Beatrice Lewis, Joint County Organiser, Lancashire, Women's Voluntary Services.
- John Liddell, Honorary Secretary, Northumberland Federation of Inshore Fishermen.
- Godfrey Albert Lord. For political services in Hertford.
- Basil Reginald Lovell, Secretary, County Agricultural Executive Committee, Winchester Division.
- John Macaskill, Superintendent, Doncaster and District Mines Rescue Station, North Eastern Division, National Coal Board.
- James Henry Frazer M'Carrison, chairman, South Antrim Hospital Management Committee.
- Thomas Russell MacDonald. For services to forestry in North Devon.
- Eleanor Louise MacGregor, Centre Organiser Islington, Women's Voluntary Services.
- John Mackay, Member, Council of the Royal Scottish Society for the Prevention of Cruelty to Children.
- William James Thomson Maclean, Senior Surveyor, Perfect, Lambert & Company.
- Robert James MacLeod, lately vice-chairman, North of Scotland War Pensions Committee.
- John Francis McMullan, Deputy Principal Officer, Ministry of Agriculture, Northern Ireland.
- William Manson, Experimental Officer, Edinburgh Office, Geological Survey and Museum, Department of Scientific and Industrial Research.
- Cyril Bemrose Martin, Inspector of Works (Buildings), No. 7 Works Area, Honington, Air Ministry.
- George Walter Guy Martyn, Radio Officer, SS Argyllshire, Siemens Brothers & Co. Ltd.
- Alfred Meade, Wholesale Butcher and Slaughtering Contractor for Reading Corporation.
- Horace Bywater Medway. For political and public services in Gillingham.
- Arthur Reginald Messam, Assistant Secretary, British Sailors' Society.
- Alan James Bryce Methven, Executive Officer, War Office.
- Walter Robert Alfred Dennis Moore, Reader in High Polymer Chemistry, Department of Chemical Technology, Bradford Institute of Technology.
- Bertrand John Joseph Moran, Gardening Superintendent, London Transport Executive.
- Alexander Morris, Civil Defence Officer, Monmouthshire.
- Rose Martha Munford, Executive Officer, Ministry of Transport and Civil Aviation.
- Alec Thomas Morton Murfet, lately Vice-Principal, Portora Royal School, Enniskillen, County Fermanagh.
- Captain David Eldorado Myers. For services to youth in West Ham.
- Margaret Bryan Napier, Head, Department for Psychiatric Social Work, Dundee Royal Mental Hospital.
- James Richard Newman, Member, Upton-upon-Severn Rural District Council.
- Amy Kathleen Nichols, Higher Executive Officer, Ministry of Pensions and National Insurance.
- John Desmond O'Hagan, Divisional Accident Prevention Organiser, North-West Division, Royal Society for the Prevention of Accidents.
- Alfred George Palmer, General Manager, Oxford Trustee Savings Bank.
- George Henry Parks, Member, Sussex District Advisory Committee, London and South Eastern Regional Board for Industry.
- Ernest Benjamin Parsons, Senior Foreman, Technical Class Officer, Grade A, Admiralty.
- Ernest George Parsons, Senior Clerk, Devon County Council.
- Mabel Sarah Jane Parsons, Matron, Monyhull Hall Hospital (for mental defectives), Birmingham.
- John Neville Patey, chairman, Regional Wholesale Provisions and Groceries Committee, North Midland Region.
- Frederick George Pauncefort, Staff Officer, Board of Inland Revenue.
- James Frederick Payne, Higher Executive Officer, Board of Trade.
- Geoffrey Theodore Peck, Area Civil Defence Controller, South West Buckinghamshire.
- Edwin Gerald Peers, Communications Officer, Grade I, London Airport, Ministry of Transport and Civil Aviation.
- Charles Gordon Penny, chairman, Barrow, Ulverston and District War Pensions Committee.
- James Penny, Local Fuel Overseer, Dundee.
- Ronald David Petrie, Head, Sound Apparatus Section, Designs Department, British Broadcasting Corporation.
- William Henry Pickard. For political services in Leicester.
- Leonard Pinder, lately Senior Inspection Officer (Aircraft), Ministry of Supply.
- John William Pirie, Senior Assistant District Auditor, Ministry of Housing and Local Government.
- Elizabeth Pitkethly, Deputy Head, Old People's Department, Headquarters, Women's Voluntary Services.
- Thomas Poulton Pitloh, Executive Engineer, Newcastle upon Tyne, General Post Office.
- Lancelot John Pitt, Safety and Civil Defence Officer, Fielding & Platt, Ltd., Gloucester.
- Cyril Plumpton, 2nd Class Valuer, Board of Inland Revenue.
- Marion Ellen Pollock, Secretary, Drawing Office Material Manufacturers' and Dealers' Association.
- Janet Mary Poole, chairman, Bradford, Shipley and District War Pensions Committee.
- Alderman David Williams Price, Member, Sennybridge District Committee, Brecon Agricultural Executive Committee.
- Frederick Price, Head Foreman Sheet Metal Worker, Cammell Laird & Co. Ltd., Birkenhead.
- Frederick Arthur Priest, Senior Executive Officer, Ministry of Pensions and National Insurance.
- Ethel Kathleen Pryor. For political and public services in Plymouth.
- Florence Annie Pulleyn, Health Visitor and School Nurse, Bury St. Edmunds, West Suffolk County Council.
- George Ramsay, Senior Executive Officer, Air Ministry.
- James Randell, Chief Ship Draughtsman, John Brown & Co. (Clydebank), Ltd.
- Pattie Alice Elizabeth Ray, District Nurse Midwife, Herstmonceux and Warding Area, Sussex.
- Agnes Beatrice Read, Head Almoner, St. Thomas' Hospital, London.
- Irene Lilian Reid, Higher Executive Officer, Ministry of Health.
- Celestine Marie Richard, Headmistress, St. Helier Secondary School for Girls, Jersey.
- Cedric Foster Richardson, Senior Executive Officer, Board of Trade.
- Robert William Richardson, JP. For political and public services in the Hartlepools.
- William Henry Richardson, Higher Executive Officer, National Assistance Board.
- Alexander Edward Robb, Technical Class, Grade I, Royal Ordnance Factory, Woolwich.
- Alexander Robertson, Assistant Postmaster, Manchester.
- Michael Strang Robinson, Assistant Keeper, First Class, National Maritime Museum.
- Clifford Rowley, Assistant Chief of Armament Design, Vickers-Armstrongs (Engineering), Ltd.
- Percy Charles Ruggles, Senior Engineer, English Electric Valve Co. Ltd., Chelmsford.
- Florence Susan Ruttle, Assistant Secretary to the United Services Trustee.
- Major George Salt, Assistant Civil Defence Officer, Bootle.
- Robert Saunsbury, Vice-chairman, Manchester Wing Committee, Air Training Corps.
- Kathleen Secker. For services as Head Abstractor, Commonwealth Mycological Institute.
- Charles Gibbons Seymour, MRCS, LRCP, Member, National Service Medical Board, Southampton.
- The Reverend Hamish Sharp, Chaplain, HM Prison, Perth.
- Edward Shaw, Senior Draughtsman, Admiralty.
- Lieutenant-Colonel Gilbert Alan Shepperd, Librarian, Royal Military Academy, Sandhurst.
- George Francis Sills. For political services in Manchester.
- William Hall Simmons, Chemist II, Royal Ordnance Factory, Bridgwater, Somerset.
- Ernest Harold Simper, Divisional Traffic Superintendent, Birmingham & Midland Motor Omnibus Co. Ltd.
- Annie Eveleen Simson. For political and public services in Kincardine and Angus.
- Christina Jane Sketchley. For political and public services in Fulham.
- Maureen Betty Skinner, Clerical Officer, Air Ministry.
- Douglas Sleath, Chief Draughtsman, Instrument Department, Laurence Scott & Electromotors, Ltd., Norwich.
- Albert Norman Mitchell Smith, Chief Press Photographer, Central Office of Information.
- Cyril Frank Smith. For political services in Buckinghamshire.
- George Howard Smith, Higher Executive Officer, Ministry of Education.
- Marjorie Smith, Divisional President, Altrincham Division, Cheshire Branch, British Red Cross Society.
- Samuel Smyth, JP Chairman, Kilkeel, County Down, Local Savings Committee.
- The Reverend John Nettleton Spence. For public services in Belfast.
- Michael Spillane, Superintendent, Head Post Office, Crewe.
- Leslie William Spratley, Accountant, Coal Merchants' Federation of Great Britain.
- Walter Henry George Spring, Higher Executive Officer, Patent Office, Board of Trade.
- William Stephen Stambrioge, Consultant, Rubery, Owen & Co. Ltd.
- Charles Stamps, Shops Superintendent, Dorman Long (Chemicals), Ltd.
- Robert Bruce Stevens, Town Clerk, Holywood Urban District Council, County Down.
- Sydney Richard Stevens, Actuary, North Staffordshire & District Trustee Savings Bank.
- George Lovell Stiles, Superintendent Radiographer, Derbyshire Royal Infirmary.
- James Arthur Stockwell, Higher Executive Officer Commonwealth Relations Office.
- Marshall Dale White Stonehouse, Distribution Liaison Technical Engineer, The Electricity Council.
- Charles Edward Strange, Higher Executive Officer, Ministry of Transport and Civil Aviation.
- Albert Edward Victor Sturrock, Pay Supervisor, British Overseas Airways Corporation.
- Wallace Lucas Swan, Grade 3 Officer, Ministry of Labour and National Service.
- Samuel Swindell, lately Member, Bakewell District Committee, Derbyshire Agricultural Executive Committee.
- John Henry Symons, Senior Executive Officer, Ministry of Agriculture, Fisheries and Food.
- Norman Howard Talbot, Deputy Senior Representative, Young Men's Christian Association, British Army of the Rhine.
- Thomas Edward Talbot. For political and public services in Stoke-on-Trent.
- Leslie Rosevear Tamblyn, Inspector of Air Raid Warnings, Western Sector.
- Frank Edward Tann. For political and public services in Baling.
- George Alfred Thiselton, Higher Executive Officer, Ministry of Pensions and National Insurance.
- James Henry Thomas, Chief Officer, Huddersfield Fire Brigade.
- Muriel Mollard Thomas, Assistant Secretary to the Lord Mayor of Bristol.
- Arthur Thompson, Poultry Advisory Officer, Grade II, National Agricultural Advisory Service, Staffordshire.
- Arthur Thompson, Press Photographer.
- The Reverend Thomas Thompson, lately Member, Whitchurch Urban District Council.
- Captain Edward James Thomson, Commodore Master, SS Eastern Queen, Indo-China Steam Navigation Co. Ltd.
- Helen Mitchell Thomson, Voluntary Worker, Young Men's Christian Association, British Army of the Rhine.
- Reginald Peter Thorne, Honorary Treasurer, Cambridge Savings Committee.
- Reginald William Francis Thorne, Overseas Telegraph Superintendent, Central Telegraph Office, General Post Office.
- Eric William Lacey Tiddy, MC, Manager, Printing House, Lloyd's Register of Shipping.
- Lieutenant-Colonel George Davidson Todd, MC, TD, lately Assistant Secretary, Territorial and Auxiliary Forces Association, Counties of Renfrew and Bute.
- Alfred Victor Tomkins, Senior Executive Officer, Ministry of Power.
- Victor William Richard Tompkins, Commandant, Special Constabulary, Metropolitan Police.
- George Brogan Tresilian, lately Chemist and Metallurgist, Edward Curran Engineering Co. Ltd.
- Stanley John Truman, chairman, Birmingham Edgbaston Sea Cadet Corps Unit.
- Frank Robert Tuck, Higher Executive Officer, Ministry of Defence.
- Harold Matthew Turner, JP. For political and public services in Lancashire.
- Henry Marcus Tydeman, Senior Experimental Officer, East Mailing Research Station.
- Janet, Mrs. Valentine. For services to Women's Golf.
- Eon Blodwen Muriel Vaughan, lately Higher Executive Office, Imperial War Museum.
- Frederick Vigus, Member, Hertfordshire Agricultural Executive Committee.
- Gustave Alfred Villiers, Regional Representative, National Schools Advisory Savings Committee.
- Frederick Waddington, Chief Superintendent, Lancashire Constabulary.
- Margaret Emma Waghorn, Executive Officer, Ministry of Health.
- John Rupert Charles Walford, Legal Assistant, Ministry of Pensions and National Insurance.
- Alexander Walker, Chief Superintendent, Metropolitan Police.
- Donald Clark Walker, Senior Executive Engineer, Research Station, General Post Office.
- Francis William Walfole, lately Clerk, Godstone Rural District Council.
- Francis Royal Warner, Head of Sales Department (Contracts Division), the General Electric Co. Ltd.
- Frederic Arthur Watts, chairman, Northampton Savings Committee.
- Doris Mary Welling, Sister, Male Geriatric Ward, Nunnery Fields Hospital, Canterbury.
- Frederick Charles Wells, Experimental Officer, Signals Research and Development Establishment, Ministry of Supply.
- Charles William Alabaster West, Main Grade Engineer, Foreign Office.
- Alderman Richard Wheater, JP, chairman, Wakefield Local Employment Committee.
- Ann White, Chief Nursing Officer, Cornwall County Council.
- George White, lately Manager, Glasgow Central Employment Exchange, Ministry of Labour and National Service.
- Thomas Frank White, Senior Executive Officer, Air Ministry.
- Timothy James Patrick White, Chief Officer, Oxfordshire Fire Brigade.
- Clarence James Beaugarde Whitesides, Executive Officer, Board of Trade.
- Stanley Wigglesworth, Safety and Civil Defence Officer, Imperial Chemical Industries (Dyestuffs), Huddersfield.
- William Lewis Wightman, Member, Teesside District Advisory Committee, Northern Regional Board for Industry.
- Joyce Katharine Baker Wilbraham, Administrator for Married Quarters at Royal Ordnance Factories, Ministry of Supply.
- Francis Henry Juxon Wilkinson, lately General Secretary, Chester and District Council of Social Welfare and Citizens' Advice Bureau.
- Gladys Mildred Williams, North Wales Member, National Street and Village Groups Advisory Savings Committee.
- Harold Wilfred Tertius Williams, Higher Executive Officer, Ministry of Housing and Local Government.
- John Douglas Boyer Williams, lately Executive Officer, Headquarters, and Controller, Main Stadium, British Empire and Commonwealth Games, 1958.
- Megan Laura Olwen Williams, Higher Executive Officer, Home Office.
- Susan Eva Williams, lately Commandant (Women), Empire Village, British Empire and Commonwealth Games, 1958.
- William Henderson Williamson, Senior Trade Officer, Ministry of Agriculture, Fisheries and Food.
- Arthur Leonard Wilson, Engineer, Technical Class, Grade I, Explosives Research and Development Establishment, Ministry of Supply.
- Edward Smith Wilson, Road Safety Officer, Borough of Slough.
- Joseph William Wilson, Senior Executive Officer, HM Stationery Office.
- Albert Winstanley, MM, Manager, Smithy & Metal Working Section, United Glass Bottle Manufacturers, Ltd.
- Robert Binnie Witherington, Works Manager, Lambhill Ironworks, Ltd., Glasgow.
- The Very Reverend Clarence Albert Edward Wolfe, Dean of Moray, Ross and Caithness, lately Warden and Secretary, The Orphanage, Aberlour, Banffshire.
- Ernest Charles Wood, Higher Executive Officer, Ministry of Agriculture, Fisheries and Food.
- Gladstone Stanley Wood, Member of Committee, No. 331 (Chesterfield) Squadron, Air Training Corps.
- Kenneth John Woodgate, Superintending Inspector, Aeronautical Inspection Service, Air Ministry.
- Alfred Wootten, lately Clerical Officer, Admiralty.
- Olive Ruby Aldridge, British subject resident in Chile.
- Gerald Frank Anderson, DFC, Second Secretary, Her Majesty's Embassy, Washington.
- Jack Charles Beaghton, British Vice Consul, Athens.
- The Reverend David Cullen Brackenridge, formerly Secretary Agent, British & Foreign Bible Society, Chile.
- Olive Brittan, British subject resident in Libya.
- John Edwin Emile Carbines, Assistant to First Secretary (Labour), Her Majesty's Embassy, Stockholm.
- Louise Marguerite Cardarelli, Assistant Press Reader, Her Majesty's Embassy, Rome.
- Edward Thomas Edmunds, British Vice Consul, Trelew.
- Bertha Robertina Edwardsen, British Pro Consul, Oslo.
- Violet Marie Gordon, British Council Lecturer, Ankara University.
- Charles William George Guyan, Inspector-General, Public Safety Branch, British Military Government, Berlin.
- Edgar Charles Harrison, lately Communications Officer, Her Majesty's Embassy, Moscow.
- Brian Desmond Holt, British Vice-Consul, Reykjavik.
- Joyce Helen Lugg, lately Personal Assistant to Her Majesty's Ambassador, Ankara.
- William Gerard McTear, Grade 6 Officer, Branch "B" of the Foreign Service, Her Majesty's Embassy, Baghdad.
- Violet Kathleen Maddox, Temporary Shorthand-Typist, Her Majesty's Embassy, Amman.
- Rachel Graham Alexander Maguire, Matron, Bahrain Government Hospital.
- Douglas John Marr, British Vice-Consul, Tórshavn.
- Charles John Martinez, British Vice-Consul, Barcelona.
- Kenneth Oldfield, Second Secretary, Her Majesty's Legation, Taiz.
- Arthur Archibald Douglas Pannett, British Vice-Consul, Marseilles.
- Norman Redvers Prickett, British Vice-Consul, Portland, Oregon.
- Dennis Reis, Second Secretary (Commercial), Her Majesty's Embassy, Beirut.
- Denise Saunders, lately Personal Assistant to Her Majesty's Ambassador, Tehran.
- William Harry Alfred Snook, British Vice-Consul, Ajaccio.
- Archibald Ross Thomas, Director, British Institute, Mosul.
- Mary Edith Todd, Shorthand-Typist, Office of the Commissioner-General for the United Kingdom in South-East Asia, Singapore.
- Joseph Andrew Arratta, MB, a medical practitioner of Muttaburra, State of Queensland.
- George Arthur Herbert Barnes. For services to the amateur theatre movement in Southern Rhodesia.
- Mai Barth, Principal, King's House School, Calcutta, India, for children of the United Kingdom community.
- Thomas George Bereng, Clerk to the Basuto Court, Basutoland.
- William George Spencer Bester, of Waratah, State of Tasmania. For services to the community.
- Ellena Doris Louisa Black. For services to the Women's Auxiliary of the Home for Incurables, State of South Australia.
- Peter Bridges, District Officer, Basutoland; seconded to the High Commissioner's Office, Basutoland, the Bechuanaland Protectorate and Swaziland.
- Jack Henry Brimmell, Assistant Secretary, Prime Minister's Department, Federation of Malaya.
- Andrew Noble Campbell. For services to local government in the State of New South Wales.
- Bruce Collins Carter, Chairman of the Richmond Shire Council, State of Queensland.
- Alfred Reginald Cooper, Senior Technical Officer, Directorate of Naval Construction, Naval Headquarters, India.
- Henry George Cox, a member of the headquarters staff of the British Commonwealth Ex-Services League.
- Hope Croll, RRC, Matron of Prince Henry Hospital, Sydney, State of New South Wales.
- Cecile Gertrude Cunliffe, Honorary Secretary, Book Department, Victoria League.
- Ethel Phyllis Deacon, Secretary of the European Association of Ceylon.
- Daphne Alexandra English, Teacher, St. Mark's School, Mbabane, Swaziland.
- James Maurice Fleming. For services to charitable and patriotic organisations in the State of Victoria.
- Howard Robert Hill French, Town Clerk, City of Geelong West, State of Victoria.
- Frank Oscar Harding. For services on behalf of charitable institutions, State of Victoria.
- Frederick William Harris, Treasury Accountant to the Armed Forces, Federation, of Malaya.
- James Patrick Ivan Hennessy, District Officer, Basutoland.
- Emily Isabella Hodgson, formerly a member of the headquarters staff of the Over-Seas League.
- John Robert Howard. For services in the interests of ex-servicemen in the State of Queensland.
- Jairos Jiri, of the Bulawayo African Township, Southern Rhodesia. For services in connection with the training of crippled Africans.
- Margaret Gwendoline Keats, a veterinary surgeon in the Kerang District, State of Victoria.
- Ivor John Lewis, Tsetse Fly Control Officer, Bechuanaland Protectorate.
- Constance Mackness. For services to Education in the State of Queensland.
- Elizabeth Matthias, Honorary Secretary, Bankstown Labour Women's Welfare Committee, State of New South Wales.
- Lillian Daphne Mayo, in recognition of her contribution to Art in the State of Queensland.
- Michael Anthony McConville, Administrative Officer, Segamat, Johore, Federation of Malaya.
- James Basil Morgan, of Jhelum, Pakistan. For services to the United Kingdom community.
- Hilda Mulligan. For services to the Arts in the State of New South Wales.
- Bogatsu Pilane, Royal Headman and Councillor of the Bakgatla Tribe, Bechuanaland Protectorate.
- Mieczyslaw Stanislaw Reichert, deputy director of Veterinary Services, Bechuanaland Protectorate.
- Helena Classina Reynolds. For public and social welfare services in the Enkeldoorn District, Southern Rhodesia.
- Walter Barnstaple Rood, Secretary of the Benevolent Society, State of New South Wales.
- Malcolm Aubrey Sparkss, Bandmaster British South Africa Police, Southern Rhodesia.
- George Frederick Stanford. For services to the Branch in the State of Victoria of the Partially Blinded Soldiers' Association of Australia.
- John Samuel Hodgert Stevenson, formerly Director of the Institute of Marine Engineering Training, Calcutta, India.
- Vernon Thomas Sutliffe. For services to many cultural and sporting bodies in the State of Tasmania.
- Ella Una Tasker, of Condobolin, State of New South Wales. For services to the community.
- Doris Taylor. For social welfare services, especially in connection with the Meals on Wheels Organisation, in the State of South Australia.
- Ruth Barbara Tredgold. For social welfare services, especially in connection with the Mission of Runyararo in Harari Township, Salisbury, Southern Rhodesia.
- Alberta Tutton. For services on behalf of charitable organisations, especially the Royal Victorian Institute for the Blind, in the State of Victoria.
- Major William George Webb, Deputy Commissioner of Prisons, Federation of Malaya.
- Barbara Dorothy Ralph Wentworth, formerly Woman Assistant Superintendent of Police, Federation of Malaya.
- The Reverend George Nesbit White, Assistant Superintendent of the Central Methodist Mission, Franklin Street, Adelaide, State of South Australia.
- Samuel William Winders. For services to Surf Life Saving and Ambulance organisations in the State of Queensland.
- Edward Othman Abdu, Education Officer, Northern Region, Nigeria.
- Robert Owen Abel. For public services in Northern Rhodesia.
- Frederick Joachim Paschal Abreo. For public services in Uganda.
- Margherita Anna Henby Adams, Registry Assistant, Kenya.
- Isaac Abiola Adejare. For public services in the Western Region, Nigeria.
- Philipo Adonga, Lawirwodi, Acholi African Local Government, Uganda.
- John Amputch, Senior Labour Officer, Fiji.
- Emanuel Akandu of Anorue, BEM, Assistant Superintendent of Police, Federation of Nigeria.
- Godfrey Chukwueloka Anyaegbunam, Principal Auditor, Eastern Region, Nigeria.
- Subramaniam Alfred Samuel Aruliah. For public services in North Borneo.
- Philippe Rene Asplet, Dental Surgeon, Mulago Hospital, Uganda.
- Rais Salem Ahmed Atiqi, Rais, Government Guards, Western Aden Protectorate.
- Turkari Aziz, Senior Matron, General Hospital, Nicosia, Cyprus.
- Clarence Eric Stanley Bailey, MB, ChB, Medical Superintendent, Holberton Hospital, Antigua, Leeward Islands.
- Gaston Tonna Barthet, Professor of French in the Royal University of Malta.
- Oswald Philip Blake. For public services in Tanganyika.
- Margaret Hester Bond, Matron, Mengo Hospital, Uganda.
- Evelyn Wood Temple-Boreham, MC, Senior Game Warden, Kenya.
- Audrey Kethleen Broomes. For public services in St. Vincent, Windward Islands.
- Dan Tukura Buba, Chief Councillor of Muri Native Authority, Northern Region, Nigeria.
- Sheikh Saidi Ali el Buhriy, Liwali of Mwanza, Tanganyika.
- Geoffrey Reginald Burden. For public services in Northern Rhodesia.
- The Reverend Charles Leonard Carty. For public services in the Leeward Islands.
- Naher Singh Chandel, Municipal Engineer, Aden Municipality.
- Chee Kong Min, Acting Office Superintendent, Police Headquarters, Singapore.
- Peter Cheung. For public services in Hong Kong.
- Joan Catherine Clatworthy, MB, BS. For public services in the Western Region, Nigeria.
- Edward Frederick Constantine, Head Teacher, St. Helena.
- Arthur Brebner Cormack, Agricultural Officer, Nyasaland.
- Noel Alfred Crosswell, Assistant Commissioner of Police, Jamaica.
- Shittu Baidthu Dabiri, Executive Officer, Education Department, Federation of Nigeria.
- Lynette DeWeever Dolphin. For services to music in British Guiana.
- Blythe Joseph Duffy, lately Field Officer, East African Trypanosomiasis Research Organisation.
- Arlington Bandele Ekun, Inspector of Works, Western Region, Nigeria.
- Frank Kenneth Elliott, lately Secretary Falkland Islands Dependencies Survey, now Chief Clerk, Secretariat, Swaziland.
- Percy John Elliott, Resident Engineer, Livingstone Power Station, Northern Rhodesia.
- Gabriel Enebeli Esimai, Administrative Officer, Eastern Region, Nigeria.
- Daniel Olorunfemi Fagunwa, Education Officer, Western Region, Nigeria.
- Fasuluku, Paramount Chief, Sando, Sierra Leone.
- Cecil Bertram Foster, lately Principal Agricultural Assistant, Barbados.
- Sybil Marjorie Gimson, Matron, Medical Department, Sierra Leone.
- Mohammadu Gobir, Waziri of Ilorin, Northern Region, Nigeria.
- John Malcolm Golds, District Officer, Kenya.
- Leonard Edmund Gore, Inspector of Works, Public Works Department, Antigua, Leeward Islands.
- Thakkayil Govindan, Registry Assistant, Office of the Chief Secretary, Tanganyika.
- Frank Grundy, MC, Meteorologist, East African Meteorological Department.
- Ronald Peter Knowles Harrison, Representative, British Council, British Honduras.
- Ghulam Hassan, Superintendent, East African Posts and Telecommunications Administration.
- Joyce Mary Hayes. For public services in Nyasaland.
- The Reverend Canon George Herbert Hewitt. For public services in Northern Rhodesia.
- Joan Ann Hopkirk. For public services in Kenya.
- Claude Samuel Israel, JP. For public services in Fiji.
- Okon Ita, Education Officer, Eastern Region Nigeria.
- Ibrahim Katsina Iya, District Headman, Mashi District, and Native Authority Councillor, Northern Region, Nigeria.
- Frank James. For public services in Sarawak.
- Gladys Jones, JP. For public services in Jamaica.
- Stanley Gordon Jones. For public services in the New Hebrides.
- Arthur Gorman Jordan, Acting District Inspector of Schools, Barbados.
- Edward Thuraisingham Joseph, Deputy Veterinary Officer, Singapore.
- Victor Clement Josse, Assistant Secretary/ Federal Government Service, The West Indies.
- Eleanor Dorothy Kerry. For services to music in British Guiana.
- George Livingstone Kigundu, Agricultural Officer, Uganda.
- William Kirkpatrick, Chief Engineer, Water Commission (Corporate Area), Jamaica.
- Cynthia Koek, chairman, Board of Film Censors, Singapore.
- Antonis Kontoyiannis, Senior Welfare Officer, Cyprus.
- Christophoros Luca Kythreotis, Administrative Officer, Class I, Cyprus.
- Joyce Acland Lawrence. For public services in Somaliland.
- Emmanuel Jean-Louis. For public services in the Seychelles.
- Hezekiah Olusola Lucas, Chief Registrar, Federation of Nigeria.
- Beresford Maddy, Legal Assistant, Sierra Leone.
- Annette Geraldine Maheia, Principal of Private Primary School, Belize, British Honduras.
- Faquir Chand Mair, Provincial Office Superintendent, Kenya.
- Nora Creina Majekodunmi. For public services in the Federation of Nigeria.
- Marie Mango, Sister Tutor, Nicosia General Hospital, Cyprus.
- Chief Petro Itosi Marealle, BEM, Divisional Chief, Chagga Council, Vunjo, Moshi, Tanganyika.
- Henry Ernest Marriott, Assistant Controller of Posts, Hong Kong.
- Manzi Matunula, Liwali of Mahuta, Tanganyika.
- Charalambos Gavriel Michaelides, BEM, Assistant Conservator of Forests, Class I, Cyprus.
- Hallel Omar Mohammed, Registrar of the Zaria Judicial Division, Northern Region, Nigeria.
- Mok Kon-Sang. For public services in Hong Kong.
- Louis Rex Mourou, Clerk of the Legislative Council, Mauritius.
- Rais Nashir Abdullah Sagladi, Rais, Government Guards, Western Aden Protectorate.
- David Arthur Nickol, Administrative Officer, Class III, Tanganyika.
- Elizabeth O'Kelly, Woman Education Officer, Federation of Nigeria.
- Reginald Valentine O'Neill, Administrative Secretary, Works and Hydraulics Department, Trinidad.
- Basil Aristides Papadopoulos. For public services in the Northern Region, Nigeria.
- Frederick St. Bernard Ayibo-Ogo Princewill, Higher Executive Officer, Public Works Department, Federation of Nigeria.
- Ida Race, Matron, Grade I, Kenya.
- Willie Peter Repetto, Headman of Tristan da Cunha.
- Stanley Charles Riggs, Community Development Secretary, Eastern Region, Nigeria.
- Lorna Ruth Milner Robinson, Social Welfare Officer, Windward Islands.
- The Reverend Douglas Auchterlenie Rothnie. For public services in Jamaica.
- Helen Scawin. For public services in Somaliland.
- Niamat Ali Shaifta, Clerk, Grade IV, East African Railways and Harbours Administration.
- Susan Louise Simms. For public services in the Bahamas.
- Seyfu Matarr Sise, District Head of Upper Saloum, Central Division, Gambia.
- Eric Nevelle Owen Smith, Permanent Way Inspector, Grade I, East African Railways and Harbours Administration.
- Frederick Moyce Smith, Deputy Superintendent of Works, Public Works Department, St. Helena.
- Eva Dykes Spicer. For public services in the Eastern Region, Nigeria.
- Tay Gan Tin. For public services in Singapore.
- Albert Edward Tiedeman, Senior Executive Officer, Office of the Crown Agents for Oversea Governments and Administrations.
- Alhaji Umoru, Madawaki of Argungu, Northern Region, Nigeria.
- Ronald Cecil Ward, Senior Establishment Officer, Uganda.
- Ella Warren. For public services in Malta.
- Victor Ernest Webster, Bandmaster, Tanganyika Police Force.
- Marie Helene Odette Tank-Wen, Librarian, Supreme Court, Mauritius.
- Louis Frederic Fernand Westergreen. For public services in the Seychelles.
- Frederick Matthew Withers. For public services in Nyasaland.
- Qaid Salih bin Yeslam Bin Sumeida, Officer Commanding Qu'aiti State Armed Forces, Eastern Aden Protectorate.
- Ignatius Yong Yaw Tong, Assistant Private Secretary to the Governor, Sarawak.
- Yu Chick Shuen, Assistant Engineer, Public Works, Department Hong Kong.

=== Order of the Companions of Honour (CH) ===
- Sir John Davidson Beazley, Emeritus Professor of Classical Archaeology, University of Oxford. For services to scholarship.
- Sir Kenneth Mackenzie Clark, KCB, chairman, Arts Council of Great Britain.

=== British Empire Medal (BEM) ===
Military Division

Royal Navy

- Chief Petty Officer Herbert Arthur Apperley, DSM, P/JX 128204.
- Chief Petty Officer Cook (O) Joseph Azzopardi, Malta/LX 22048.
- Chief Airman Derrick Elliott Bainbridge, L/FX 670429.
- Chief Petty Officer Gordon Frank Beach, P/JX 138115.
- Sick Berth Chief Petty Officer Samuel Horace Branford, P/MX 57682.
- Mechanician 1st Class William Henry Burt, D/KX 802460.
- Chief Engine Room Artificer Roy Victor Carpenter, C/MX 51740.
- Acting Chief Electrical Artificer (Air) Brian Edward Chubb, L/FX 669633.
- Chief Engine Room Artificer Reginald Clough, D/MX 52937.
- Chief Petty Officer Harold Arthur Robert Copping, C/JX 141909.
- Chief Wren (Clothing) Glory Hilda May England, 2341, Women's Royal Naval Service.
- Aircraft Mechanician 1st Class Albert Flower, L/FX 77427.
- Stores Chief Petty Officer (V) Arthur Eric Gibbins, P/MX 58691.
- Chief Petty Officer Joseph Allen Gowans, B/997251, Royal Naval Reserve.
- Chief Electrician John William Penfold Griffin, P/MX 842109.
- Chief Petty Officer Henry George William Hall, DSM, P/JX 156454.
- Chief Air Fitter (O) Gaius Potter Hiscox, L/FX 76274.
- Chief Petty Officer Cook (S) Douglas Walter Jacob, P/MX 57020.
- Chief Petty Officer James Hutchison McArthur, D/J 41406.
- Chief Petty Officer Leonard Charles Mills, D/JX 137768.
- Petty Officer Steward Ngai ah Sing, SN 1125.
- Ordinary Seaman Isimeli Racika, F.R.1240, Fiji Royal Naval Volunteer Reserve.
- Chief Petty Officer Jack Stanley Reynolds, P/JX 133273.
- Quartermaster Sergeant Horace Arthur Albert Richmond, RMV 200950, Royal Marines Forces Volunteer Reserve.
- Chief Petty Officer Steward Frank George Smith, D/LX 21557.
- Chief Electrician Frank Thompson, V 994600, Royal Naval Reserve.
- Chief Electrical Artificer (L) Matthew William Wallace, P/MX 52590.
- Chief Ordnance Artificer Albert John Wilkinson, P/MX 52867.
- Chief Radio Supervisor Special Derek Raymond Wilkinson, C/JX 160607.
- Chief Petty Officer Writer Frederick Leonard Wood, D/MX 64522.
- Quartermaster Sergeant Thomas Yates, ChX2482, Royal Marines.

Army

- 23203793 Warrant Officer Class II (acting) William Albert Arthur, Corps of Royal Electrical and Mechanical Engineers.
- S/19039938 Staff-Sergeant (acting) Harold Geoffrey Aston, Royal Army Service Corps.
- 22812818 Colour-Sergeant (acting) Victor Botten, The Cheshire Regiment.
- W/281176 Sergeant Edna May Bruce, Women's Royal Army Corps, Territorial Army.
- 14472836 Staff-Sergeant Denis Clarke, Corps of Royal Engineers.
- 6014494 Colour-Sergeant Reginald Henry Clarke, The Royal Norfolk Regiment.
- S/22S33702 Staff-Sergeant Malcolm Gordon James Cooke, Royal Army Service Corps.
- 1517040 Staff-Sergeant Frank Davies, Army Catering Corps.
- 22515193 Staff-Sergeant (acting) George Donovan, Royal Corps of Signals.
- 21129122 Squadron Quartermaster-Sergeant Arthur Drew, Corps of Royal Engineers, Territorial Army.
- 22283900 Sergeant (acting) William Peter Drost, Royal Regiment of Artillery.
- 2325719 Staff-Sergeant Ernest James Elliott, Royal Corps of Signals.
- 2556329 Sergeant James Gibson, Corps of Royal Engineers, Territorial Army.
- 3185341 Pipe-Major (acting) John Brockie Gray, The Royal Scots Greys (2nd Dragoons), Royal Armoured Corps, Territorial Army.
- 14694692 Sergeant Gustavus George Francis Gyllenship, Corps of Royal Electrical and Mechanical Engineers.
- 30371 Regimental Sergeant-Major Amadu Katsina, The Queen's Own Nigeria Regiment, Royal West African Frontier Force.
- W/270983 Warrant Officer Class II (acting) Edna Laister, Women's Royal Army Corps.
- 3244883 Warrant Officer Class II (acting) Robert Law, Army Catering Corps.
- T/92341 Warrant Officer Class II (acting) Raymond Lawton, Royal Army Service Corps.
- 2548788 Sergeant George Patrick Long, Corps of Royal Electrical and Mechanical Engineers.
- 23497581 Battery Quartermaster-Sergeant (acting) George Henderson Mackenzie, Royal Regiment of Artillery.
- 7655356 Staff-Sergeant (now Warrant Officer Class II) Jack Frederick Martin, Corps of Royal Electrical and Mechanical Engineers.
- 19054317 Staff-Sergeant David Arthur Thomas Metherall, Corps of Royal Electrical and Mechanical Engineers.
- 22803351 Sergeant (acting) John Cutting Moore, The Royal Norfolk Regiment.
- 22225905 Warrant Officer Class II (local) (now Sergeant) Peter Howden Ness, Royal Army Ordnance Corps.
- 22825295 Warrant Officer Class II (acting) John Richard Nicholson, Royal Army Ordnance Corps.
- 845894 Warrant Officer Class II (acting) (now substantive) Leslie Grantham Osborne, Military Provost Staff Corps.
- 14406202 Sergeant (acting) Lawrence John O'Shea, Royal Army Veterinary Corps.
- T/44713 Company-Quartermaster-Sergeant Thomas Herbert Parker, Royal Army Service Corps.
- 2211771 Sergeant Alick Arthur Plummer, Corps of Royal Engineers, Territorial Army.
- SLA/65156 Regimental Sergeant-Major Peter Pobee, Sierra Leone Educational Service, Royal West African Frontier Force.
- 2547954 Staff-Sergeant Robert Valpre Raine, Corps of Royal Electrical and Mechanical Engineers.
- 7591037 Staff-Sergeant Reno Said, Corps of Royal Electrical and Mechanical Engineers.
- 2656853 Colour-Sergeant Robert Scoffins, Coldstream Guards.
- W/63743 Sergeant Hilda Settle, Women's Royal Army Corps.
- 828791 Staff-Sergeant (Artillery Clerk) Demetrius Seyes, Royal Regiment of Artillery, Territorial Army.
- NA/106131 Regimental Sergeant-Major Charles Shadrack, The Queen's Own Nigeria Regiment, Royal West African Frontier Force.
- T/22540735 Sergeant Peter Boyle Smith, Royal Army Service Corps.
- 22521328 Staff-Sergeant Charles Henry Spalding, Royal Regiment of Artillery, Territorial Army.
- 826878 Staff-Sergeant (Artillery Clerk) Ronald Frederick Streatfield, Royal Regiment of Artillery.
- 4191196 Sergeant (Provisional) Sidney Thomas, Royal Regiment of Artillery, Territorial Army.
- 2580903 Staff-Sergeant Norman Tipton, Royal Corps of Signals.
- 22189240 Staff-Sergeant Raymond Taylor Turbitt, Royal Army Educational Corps.
- 14463498 Staff-Sergeant (acting) Albert Edward Walters, Army Catering Corps.
- 4916555 Sergeant Fred Ward, The South Staffordshire Regiment, Territorial Army.
- 22514085 Sergeant (acting) Francis Henry Ward, Corps of Royal Electrical and Mechanical Engineers.
- S/130983 Warrant Officer Class II (acting) James Frederick Norman Whitaker, Royal Army Service Corps.
- 19078553 Sergeant James William Witham, Corps of Royal Engineers.
- S/7894019 Warrant Officer Class II (acting) Cyril Witty, Royal Army Service Corps.
- X/7961892 Sergeant (acting) George Zellma, Intelligence Corps.

Royal Air Force

- 515173 Flight Sergeant Charles Edward Brown.
- 539658 Flight Sergeant Gerald Kellow Cook.
- 528494 Flight Sergeant Dennis Cooper.
- 528402 Flight Sergeant John Cosgrove.
- 568705 Flight Sergeant John Grimshaw.
- 1521136 Flight Sergeant Arthur George Lenz.
- 977405 Flight Sergeant Eamon James Moore.
- 626831 Flight Sergeant Albert Sutton.
- 619854 Flight Sergeant Basil Ferguson Vernon.
- 550562 Flight Sergeant Addison William George Verrill.
- 1159379 Flight Sergeant Robert Leslie Wall.
- 521273 Flight Sergeant John Wise.
- 4020209 Chief Technician Peter Ronald Birkett.
- 571794 Chief Technician Ronald Evans.
- 1244695 Chief Technician William George Grey.
- 573798 Chief Technician Raymond Albert Honeybone.
- 573579 Chief Technician Vaughan Thomas Kidson.
- 569985 Chief Technician John Maggs.
- 573463 Chief Technician John Lloyd Owens.
- 633475 Chief Technician Francis Edward Joseph Parsons.
- 572977 Chief Technician Robert Swift.
- 576476 Chief Technician Thomas Henry Archibald Waite.
- 544088 Acting Flight Sergeant George Ronald John Holt.
- 2267225 Acting Flight Sergeant Jack Holt.
- 949905 Acting Flight Sergeant John Langford.
- 536676 Sergeant Austen Foch Beddoes.
- 579783 Sergeant William James Cochrane.
- 714047 Sergeant Osmond George Dowell.
- 3504295 Sergeant Peter Rayner Kennett.
- 1049562 Sergeant Charles Rex Knutton.
- 579206 Sergeant Ronald Ludbrook.
- 4008485 Sergeant David Derek Nesbitt.
- 2274750 Sergeant Ivor Bruce Robinson.
- 4021138 Sergeant Reginald Peter Stennings.
- 2353856 Sergeant Alexander Cook Walker.
- 923125 Sergeant Thomas Bennet White.
- 4041328 Acting Sergeant Kenneth Adrian Symes.
- 2257383 Corporal James Joseph Curran.
- 588796 Corporal John Henry George Dartnall.
- 4042209 Corporal Michael John Melvin.
- 4144022 Corporal Jeffrey Smith.
- 3005043 Corporal Technician Gordon Douglas Warburton.
- 3086259 Corporal Technician Raymond John Emerton White.
- 4175424 Senior Aircraftman John Wilson Love.
- 3089701 Senior Aircraftman John Alistair William Wilson.

Civil Division

United Kingdom

- Carmela Josephine Lorenza Antonia Agius, Head Seamstress, Royal Naval Hospital, Malta.
- Jennie Lowes Aplin, Supervisor, Telephone Exchange, Head Post Office, Whitehaven.
- Alfred Frederick Argrave, Civilian Master Tailor, The Buffs Depot, Canterbury.
- Robert Asher, Foreman Electrician, Lincoln Power Station, East Midlands Division, Central Electricity Generating Board. (Lincoln).
- George Wilfred Ashman, Outside Supervisor, B. Whitehouse & Sons, Ltd., Birmingham.
- Joseph Austin, Head Porter, Royal Albert Edward Infirmary, Wigan.
- Olive W. Bailey, Honorary Collector, Street Savings Group, Londonderry.
- George Baker, lately Chief Officer, Class I, HM Prison, Wandsworth. (Chard, Somerset).
- Griffin Fred Baker, Constable, Admiralty Constabulary. (Manningtree, Essex).
- James Ballantyne, Chief Inspector, Fawcett, Preston & Co. Ltd., Cheshire.
- Frederick Bampton, Grade 3 Officer, Branch D, HM Embassy, Bucharest.
- Ursula Mildred Barter, Centre Organiser, Farnham, Women's Voluntary Services.
- Agnes Armstrong Bayne, Sub-Postmistress, Portpatrick Sub-Office, Stranraer.
- Joseph Smith Beck, Boatswain, RFA Eddyreef, Admiralty. (Dumbarton).
- Harold George Henry Becker, District Chief Warden, Orpington. (Petts Wood, Kent).
- Edward Benjamin Beckett, Labourer, RAF Hemswell. (Bishop Norton, Lincolnshire).
- Sidney Herbert Claude Bell, Chargehand Research and Experimental Mechanic (Carpenter), Atomic Weapons Research Establishment, United Kingdom Atomic Energy Authority. (Little Wakering, Essex).
- Harold Edward Bonner, Electrical Maintenance Engineer. For services in connection with the British Government Pavilion, Universal and International Exhibition, Brussels.
- Phoebe Bradley, Centre Organiser, Henley Municipal Borough, Women's Voluntary Services. (Henley-on-Thames).
- William George Brett, Chargehand Transport Driver, Southern Electricity Board. (Southampton).
- Thomas George Brown, Chief Lineman, London Midland Region British Railways. (Chester).
- Stewart George Bunn, Chief Observer, No. 7 Group Operations Centre, Royal Observer Corps. (Bedford).
- Henry Burdett, Chargehand Fitter (Electrical), Ministry of Works. (London S.E.22).
- John Henry Edward Burgess, Instructor and Bomb Reconnaissance Officer, Civil Defence Corps, Isle of Wight.
- Reginald William Machell Burns, DCM, Technician, Class I, Telephone Manager's Office, Lancaster.
- Alice May Butler, Honorary Collector, Street Savings Groups, Wimbledon. (London S.W.20).
- Douglas M. Butler, Technical Officer, Board of Management for Glasgow Western Hospitals. (Burnside, Lanarkshire).
- Marguerite Imelda Byrne, Chief Supervisor, Head Post Office, Coventry.
- Thomas Edward Carlin, Screenhand, Shirland Colliery, East Midlands Division, National Coal Board. (Derby).
- Marjorie Caulfield, Assistant Group Officer, Manchester Fire Brigade.
- Albert Edward Chignell, Inspector, Metropolitan Police. (Richmond, Surrey).
- John William Clark, Stoneman, Fishburn Colliery, Durham Division, National Coal Board. (Stockton-on-Tees).
- Leonora Mary Clifford, Travelling Supervisor, Reading Telephone Area, Reading. (Bourne End).
- Albert Edward Cook, Training Officer, Penallta Colliery, South Western Division, National Coal Board. (Hengoed).
- George Hubert Cornwell, District Inspector, Liverpool Street, Eastern Region, British Railways. (Enfield, Middlesex).
- Henry Thomas Cottam, Deputy, Bank Hall Colliery, North Western Division, National Coal Board. (Burnley).
- Samuel Couch, Head Foreman Coppersmith, Vickers-Armstrongs (Shipbuilders) Ltd., Newcastle upon Tyne. (South Shields).
- John Frederick Cresswell, Civilian Warrant Officer, No. 82 (Wandsworth Squadron), Air Training Corps. (London S.W.8).
- Alfred Cumberland, Member, Dumbarton Division, Civil Defence Corps.
- Annie Cupit, Honorary Collector, Duke Street Savings Group, Hucknall. (Nottingham).
- Frank Arthur Dann, Technical Class, Grade II, No. 4 Ground Radio Servicing Squadron, RAF Chigwell. (Hastings).
- Harry Darbyshire, Sergeant, Surrey Constabulary. (Guildford).
- John Darlington, Chargehand Circulating Water Plant Attendant, Ribble Power Station, North West, Merseyside & North Wales Region, Central Electricity Generating Board. (Preston).
- Francis Davidson, Volunteer-in-Charge, Gardenstown Life Saving Apparatus Company, Banff.
- Albert Davies, Contractor, Yorkshire Main Colliery, North Eastern Division, National Coal Board. (Doncaster).
- John James Dayson, Chief Inspector, Lancashire Constabulary. (Preston).
- Alfred Cecil Deabill, lately Inspector, Air Ministry Constabulary. (Abingdon).
- Bernard Dolan, Land Preventive Man, Board of Customs and Excise. (Newtownbutler, County Fermanagh).
- James Donelly, Assistant Distribution Superintendent, Carlisle Gasworks, Northern Gas Board. (Carlisle).
- Percival William Down, Station Officer, Devon Fire Brigade. (Exmouth).
- Leo Burton Duckett, Grade 3 Officer, Branch "D", HM Embassy, Rangoon, Burma.
- Albert Brown Ellis, Local Instructor, Civil Defence Corps, Middlesbrough.
- Lewis Alfred Ellis, Yeoman Clerk, HM Tower of London.
- Alexander F. Esplin, Smallholder, Coupar Angus, Perthshire.
- Gwen Evans, Honorary Collector, Clog-y-Berth Street Savings Group, Portmadoc.
- Thomas Firth, Inspector (Postal), Head Post Office, Darlington.
- Francis John Fisk, Technical Officer, East Telephone Area, London. (London E.7).
- Horace Fletcher, Drover, Birmingham City Meat Market.
- John Forster, Leading Hand Fitter, Alkali Division, Imperial Chemical Industries. (Northwich).
- Frank Foster, Sub-District Commandant, Ulster Special Constabulary. (Garrison, County Fermanagh).
- Harold Foster, Repairer, Monk Bretton Colliery, North Eastern Division, National Coal Board. (Barnsley).
- George Fothergill, Nursing Assistant, Prudhoe and Monkton Hospital, County Durham.
- Jane Christobel Meek Fox, Collector, Street Savings Group, Brentwood, Essex.
- David Cyril French, Assistant Inspector, South Western District, General Post Office.. (London S.E.14).
- William Herbert Garrod, Motor Driver Chargehand, Ministry of Labour and National Service. (London N.17).
- Ernest James Gilbert, Universal Miller and Gear Cutter, Royal Aircraft Establishment, Ministry of Supply. (Farnborough).
- John Grundy, Grinder, Joseph Lucas (Electrical) Ltd. (Birmingham).
- John Joseph Hallisey, Civilian Diving Officer, Admiralty. (Rosyth).
- Joseph Harris, Boiler House Chargehand, British Sugar Corporation Ltd., Cupar, Fife.
- William George Harris, Bricklayer Instructor, Rotherham College of Technology.
- William George Hatton, Rescue Officer, Civil Defence Corps, Cambridge.
- William John Arthur Hawes, DonkeymanGreaser, MS Ringdove, General Steam Navigation Co. Ltd. (Grays, Essex).
- William Henry, Colliery Contractor, New Monckton Collieries, North Eastern Division, National Coal Board. (Wakefield).
- John Higgins, MM, Permanent Way Inspector, Western Region, British Railways. (Newport, Monmouthshire).
- Robert Hilditch, Head Foreman Shipwright, Harland & Wolff, Belfast.
- Harold Edmond Hoggard, General Foreman, Scarborough District, North Eastern Electricity Board.
- Frederick Harold Hudson, Quay Foreman, Southampton Harbour Board.
- Arthur Henry Hunt, General Foreman, British Thomson Houston Co. Ltd., Leicester. (Rugby)
- Thomas James Murray Hutchison, Principal Lightkeeper, North Unst Lighthouse, Northern Lighthouse Board.
- Lilian Jefferies, Commandant, Worcester 24 Detachment, Worcestershire Branch, British Red Cross Society.
- Joseph James Jennings, Chief Inspector, War Department Constabulary, Ministry of Supply. (Chorley).
- George Albert Johnson, Vehicle Foreman, Leeds Depot, North Eastern Division, British Road Services.
- Edgar Graham Jones, Commandant, Halifax Special Constabulary.
- John Jones, Sub-Postmaster, Blaenau Ffestiniog, Merionethshire.
- Clifford Kent, Security Officer and Fire Officer, British Belting & Asbestos Ltd. (Cleckheaton, Yorkshire).
- Walter Henry Kerridge, Distribution Foreman, Ipswich Division, Eastern Gas Board.
- Alexander Lawie, Sub-Officer, Inverurie, North Eastern Area Fire Brigade.
- Elizabeth McLay Leishman, Matron, Girls Home, Cobden Street, Dundee.
- George Redvers Lewin, Caretaker, Heliopolis War Cemetery, Cairo, Imperial War Graves Commission.
- Joseph Lopez, Assistant Foreman, Military Hospital, Gibraltar.
- Arthur Victor Lush, Chief Warder, Geological Survey and Museum, Department of Scientific and Industrial Research. (Southall, Middlesex).
- Donald Stanley Lyon, Principal Photographer, British Museum. (London E.17).
- Thomas Mcallister, lately Pipe Major, Shotts and Dykehead Caledonian Pipe Band.
- Samuel Movements, Sub-District Commandant, Ulster Special Constabulary. (Waterside, Londonderry).
- Stanley Francis MacDonald, Non-Technical II, Royal Aircraft Establishment, Ministry of Supply. (Aylesbury).
- William McKay, Foreman Tester, Drysdale & Co. Ltd. (Glasgow).
- Margaret Mackenzie, Assistant Supervisor (Telephones), Head Post Office, Oban.
- Frederick John Mankelow, Office Keeper, Patent Office, Board of Trade. (London E.4).
- Herbert Robert Manship, Master, Cromer Light Vessel, Corporation of Trinity House. (Great Yarmouth).
- Mary Irene Manson, Member, Services Welfare Department, Women's Voluntary Services. (London W.8).
- William Benjamin Marley, Superintendent of Distribution, Liverpool Corporation Water Department.
- Thomas Daniel Martin, Foreman, Class I, London Transport Executive. (Ruislip, Middlesex).
- James Thomas Oliver Mason, DSM, Assistant Divisional Officer, London Fire Brigade (London S.E.14).
- John Mason, Colliery Deputy, Grade II, Cwmtillery Colliery, South Western Division, National Coal Board. (Abertillery).
- Charles Meikle, Electrical Instrument Tester, The Record Electrical Co. Ltd. (Cheshire).
- Eli Moore, Process Worker Grade I, Royal Ordnance Factory, Bridgwater, Somerset. (Woolavington).
- William Moorhouse, Trainee Supervisor (underground), St. John's Colliery, North Eastern Division, National Coal Board. (Nonnanton).
- Gladys Morris, Assistant Commandant and Ambulance Officer, Herefordshire Branch, British Red Cross Society. (Hereford).
- Henry James Morris, Senior Paperkeeper, HM Stationery Office. (London W.6).
- William Mullen, Colliery Datal Worker, Esh Colliery, Durham Division, National Coal Board. (Esh Winning, County Durham).
- Daniel Finlay Morton Murray, Clerk of Works (Grade III), Department of Agriculture for Scotland. (Munlochy, Ross-shire).
- Agnes Eva Newell, Display and Design Specialist, Public Relations Department, Women's Voluntary Services. (London W.4).
- George William Nicholson, Valve Shop Foreman, Richardsons Westgarth (Hartlepool) Ltd.
- Lam On, Fitter Overseer, Admiralty, Hong Kong.
- Lawrence Owen, Toolroom Fitter, Blackburn & General Aircraft Ltd. (Brough).
- Laura Paine, Honorary Collector, Persistent Savings Group, Finchley, London.
- William Thomas Pearce, lately Honorary Collector, Connor Down W.I. Savings Groups, Hayle.
- James Plunkett, Sample Passer, Dorman Long & Co. Ltd. (Middlesbrough).
- John Raper, Senior Shipkeeper, Admiralty. (Hull).
- Halil Redjeb, Inspector, Royal Air Force Police Auxiliaries, Cyprus.
- William Rhodes, Foreman of Stores, No. 21 Maintenance Unit, RAF Fauld. (Uttoxeter).
- Frank Ridings, Maker-up of textiles, J. Chadwick & Co. Ltd.., Oldham. (Chadderton).
- Arthur Reginald Robinson, Hospital Chief Officer, Class I, HM Prison, Wormwood Scrubs.
- Margaret Norah Rookley, Supervisor (F), Head Post Office, St. Austell, Cornwall.
- David Rumsey, Inspector (Postal), General Post Office, Rochester. (Chatham).
- Leslie Herbert Hayward Rush, Inspector, West Sussex Constabulary. (Chichester).
- Duncan Hood Russell, Surface Foreman, Preston Grange Colliery, Scottish Division, National Coal Board. (Prestonpans).
- Georgina Gladys Salt, Convoy Organiser, Food Flying Squad, Sutton Coldfield. (Coleshill).
- Hannah Salter, Winding Supervisor, Rotax Ltd. (London W.3).
- James McLennan Sanderson, Pipe Major, Queen Victoria School, Dunblane.
- Thomas Sayner, School Staff Instructor, Sebright School Combined Cadet Force. (Kidderminster).
- Bert Henry George Scammell, Greaser, SS Ivernia, Cunard Steamship Co. Ltd. (Southampton).
- Emily Scott, Honorary Collector, Centre Street Savings Group, Pontefrack.
- Frank Shaw, Assistant Foreman, Outside Engineering Department, Cammell Laird & Company. (Wirral).
- James Bell Shaw, Onsetter, Dawdon Colliery, Durham Division, National Coal Board. (Dawdon).
- Richard Edward Shrive, Foreman, War Office. (Mortimer, Berkshire).
- Herbert Smallbones, Machine Shop Inspector, Taskers of Andover (1932) Ltd.
- Samuel Smith, Industrial Worker, Drainage Department, Devon Division, Ministry of Agriculture, Fisheries and Food. (Exeter).
- William Smith, Chargehand Process Worker Grade I, Royal Ordnance Factory, Bishopton, Renfrewshire. (Glasgow).
- Thomas Victor Stevenson, District Foreman, Electricity Board for Northern Ireland. (Banbridge, County Down).
- Frank Stockton, Mains Foreman, North Western Electricity Board. (Rochdale).
- George Summerfield, Carpenter, SS Orcades, Orient Line to Australia. (Bearsted, Kent).
- Albert Frank Sweet, Inspector (Postal), Head Post Office, Yeovil.
- William Thackray, Hardener, George Ibberson & Company, Sheffield.
- Alfred Thomas, Lock-keeper, Gloucester Lock, British Transport Waterways.
- William Thwaites, Manager, Telephone House Refreshment Club, Salford. (Manchester).
- Frank Tomany, Rubber Production Worker, George MacLellan & Co. Ltd., Glasgow.
- Amy L. Tooley, Voluntary Association Worker, Collyhurst Community Centre, Manchester.
- Richard Thomas Treadaway, Meat Despatch Manager, T. Wall & Sons Ltd. (London W.3).
- Hilda Margaret Trennery, Chief Supervisor, Continental Exchange, Long Distance Area General Post Office. (Beckenham, Kent).
- Leslie George Walter Triggs, DSM, Warden, Royal Naval College, Greenwich.
- Ivor Donald Trimming, Chief Observer, Post S/B4, No. 5 Group, Royal Observer Corps. (Elstree, Hertfordshire).
- Bertram William Horace Turner, General Foreman (Assistant), Eastern Electricity Board. (Romford, Essex).
- George Wallace, Deputy, Pennyvenie 2/7 Colliery, Scottish Division, National Coal Board. (Dalmellington, Ayrshire).
- Charles Edward Webb, Clerk of Works (Electrical), Grade II, War Office. (Belfast).
- Arthur John Welberry, Technical Officer, Post Office Radio Station, Oxford. (Witney).
- Samuel Henry Whitehead, Foreman Electrical Fitter, Leicestershire and Warwickshire Sub-Area, East Midlands Electricity Board. (Hinckley).
- Joseph Whyatt, Civilian Warrant Officer, No. 247 (Ashton-under-Lyne) Squadron, Air Training Corps. (Dukinfield, Cheshire).
- Edgar Wilkinson, Draughtsman, Telephone Manager's Office, Leeds.
- Richard Joseph Wilson, Leading Hand Process Worker I, Royal Ordnance Factory, Burghfield, Berkshire. (Reading).
- Arthur James Withey, Tool Designer, J. W. Singer & Sons, Frome.
- Herbert Wye, lately Fencing Foreman, Windsor Estate, Windsor.

State of New South Wales

- Thomas Jones, MM, lately Senior Messenger, Government House, State of New South Wales.

Southern Rhodesia

- Edward Henry Guinan Hetherington, Staff Chief Inspector, British South Africa Police.

Overseas Territories

- Mohamed Khan, Permanent Way Inspector, Grade I, East African Railways and Harbours Administration.
- Mzee Waziri, Assistant Traffic Inspector, Grade VI, East African Railways and Harbours Administration.
- Murdo Morrison, Head Shepherd, Port San Carlos farm, Falkland Islands.
- Karamo Janko Kinte, Senior Interpreter, Protectorate Administration, Gambia.
- Wong Yin Chiu, Overseer, Urban Services Department, Hong Kong.
- Makan Budhi, Senior Dredge Chargehand, Magadi Soda Company, Kenya.
- Thimba Wilfred Kamau, Rehabilitation Assistant, Grade I, Kenya.
- Henry James Geen, Export Protection Officer, St. Kitts, Leeward Islands.
- Emanuel Oke Aiyede, Licensed Surveyor, Lagos, Federation of Nigeria.
- Martin Ichaba Joseph Oshoke, Dispensary Superintendent, Idoma Native Authority Medical Department, Northern Region of Nigeria.
- Tanimowo Gbadamosi Azzan, Produce Inspector, Grade I, Western Region of Nigeria.
- Voo Hen Chung, Fanner, North Borneo.
- Thomas Goodwin Mtawale, Senior African Printer, Government Printer's Department, Northern Rhodesia.
- Euphrem Pool, Agricultural Assistant, Agricultural Department, Seychelles.
- Allieu Bobo Mabey, Endemic Diseases Assistant, Grade II, Sierra Leone.
- Koh Peng Yam, Assistant Foreman, Electrical Department, Singapore Harbour Board, Singapore.
- Ali Kahiyeh, Assistant Local Authority, Somaliland.
- Kassim, Mkamanjeye, Local Court Messenger, Tanganyika.
- Yohane Kinyala Lauwo, Chief Mountain Guide, Mountain Club of East Africa, Kilimanjaro Section, Tanganyika.
- Basil Elliot Dasent, Banana Officer, St. Vincent, Windward Islands.
- Kheri Saleh, Telephone Supervisor, Public Works Department, Zanzibar.

=== Royal Victorian Medal (RVM) ===
In Silver

- William Collins.
- Arthur John Cordery.
- John Dickie.
- Band Sergeant William Leslie Herbert, RMB/X 2773, Royal Marines.
- 4069396 Corporal Brian Lambert, Royal Air Force.
- Barbara Macdonald.
- Helena Meade.
- Arthur Nutbeem.
- Edith Odlum.
- Arthur McIntyre Pringle.
- 513293 Warrant Officer George Wilfred Taylor, Royal Air Force.
- Theodore Verbeck.
- Robert Henry Webber.
- Messenger Sergeant-Major William George Woodman, Her Majesty's Bodyguard of the Yeomen of the Guard.
- Police Constable William Thomas Wratten, Metropolitan Police.

=== Royal Red Cross (RRC) ===
- Colonel Kathleen Mary Blair, ARRC, (206034), Queen Alexandra's Royal Army Nursing Corps.
- Lieutenant-Colonel Ethel Winifred Rosalie Warner, ARRC, (206526), Queen Alexandra's Royal Army Nursing Corps.
- Squadron Officer Alison Blyth Miller, ARRC, (405268), Princess Mary's Royal Air Force Nursing Service.

==== Associate of the Royal Red Cross (ARRC) ====
- Beryl Dorothy Laycock, Superintending Sister, Queen Alexandra's Royal Naval Nursing Service.
- Lily May Letchford, Superintending Sister, Queen Alexandra's Royal Naval Nursing Service.
- Major Ramsey Violet Hepburn (206223), Queen Alexandra's Royal Army Nursing Corps.
- Major Christina Moseley (244257), Queen Alexandra's Royal Army Nursing Corps.
- Major Dorothy Mary Wilson (305955), Queen Alexandra's Royal Army Nursing Corps.
- Squadron Officer Winifred Minnie Waller (405144), Princess Mary's Royal Air Force Nursing Service.

=== Air Force Cross (AFC) ===
Royal Navy

- Commander Patrick Charles Stuart Chilton.

Royal Air Force

- Acting Wing Commander Edwin Frederick Brown, DFC, (152167).
- Squadron Leader David Andrew (55668).
- Squadron Leader Edwin Claxton (164160).
- Squadron Leader Leonard Davies (148809).
- Squadron Leader Terence Charlesworth Gledhill (181720).
- Squadron Leader Bertram John Leigh Greenland (146422).
- Squadron Leader Richard Hampton (201244).
- Squadron Leader Donald John Harper (188610).
- Squadron Leader John Francis Langer (150840).
- Squadron Leader Raymond Ernest Paul (123447).
- Squadron Leader Archie Kenneth Strudwick, DFC, (53347).
- Flight Lieutenant Anthony Hugh Currey Back (2608191).
- Flight Lieutenant George Harold Beaton (4038412).
- Flight Lieutenant Harry Myddleton Fisher (4049135).
- Flight Lieutenant George Frederick Gill (150523).
- Flight Lieutenant Douglas Richard Jennings (57065).
- Flight Lieutenant Matthew Berriman Kemp (1608898).
- Flight Lieutenant Jesse Humphrey Kingsbury (199684).
- Flight Lieutenant Patrick Joseph McMonagle, DFM, (187163).
- Flight Lieutenant Royland Dennis Shrivell (161080).
- Flight Lieutenant Stanley Sollitt (1081071).
- Flight Lieutenant William Logan Sowter (197874).
- Flight Lieutenant Leslie Swart (2507952).

==== Bar to Air Force Cross ====
Royal Air Force

- Wing Commander Edgar James, DFC, AFC, (87346).
- Squadron Leader Robert Norman Bates, AFC, (58049).
- Squadron Leader Charles Watkinson, DFC, AFC, (55069).
- Flight Lieutenant Charles John Morgan, AFC, (1609719).
- Flight Lieutenant Simon John Thomas, AFC, (119074).

==== Second Bar to Air Force Cross ====
Royal Air Force

- Wing Commander Leslie George Press, AFC, (117153).

=== Air Force Medal (AFM) ===
Royal Air Force

- 1670190 Flight Sergeant Henry Walter Gibson.
- 1585080 Flight Sergeant Richard Albert George Hedges.
- 1867544 Flight Sergeant Charles William Lyons.
- 1569780 Flight Sergeant Harry Watt Mackenzie.
- 1553014 Sergeant Hugh Air Bell.

=== Queen's Commendation for Valuable Service in the Air ===
United Kingdom

- Lieutenant-Commander Joseph Elliot, AFC, Royal Navy (Retired), Chief Test Pilot, The de Havilland Aircraft Co. Ltd.
- Captain Harold James Field, Senior Captain, First Class, British Overseas Airways Corporation.
- Squadron Leader Hedley George Hazelden, DFC, Chief Test Pilot, Handley Page, Ltd.
- Captain Peter John McKeown, Senior Captain, First Class, British European Airways Corporation.
- Captain Albert Meagher, DFC, Deputy Flight Manager, Britannia 312 Flight, British Overseas Airways Corporation.
- James Miller, Flight Radio Officer, British Overseas Airways Corporation.
- George William Rodgers, Radio Officer, Grade "A", British European Airways Corporation.

Army

- Lieutenant-Colonel Colin David Stuart Kennedy (63505), Royal Regiment of Artillery.

Royal Air Force

- Acting Group Captain Douglas Iveson, DSO, DFC.
- Wing Commander Cecil Henry Saunders, DFC, (42893), (Retired).
- Squadron Leader Donald Aston Arnott, DFC, (607080).
- Squadron Leader George Peter Brett Bailey (178452).
- Squadron Leader Donald Sydney Collier, AFC, (163832).
- Squadron Leader Lawrence Harrington (58308).
- Squadron Leader Ernest George Percy Jeffery (202974).
- Squadron Leader John Thomas Jennings (203837).
- Squadron Leader Ronald William Payne, AFC, (187433).
- Squadron Leader Bernard Sherwin (201566).
- Flight Lieutenant Geoffrey Bingham (4065536).
- Flight Lieutenant Douglas Gordon Brady (125942).
- Flight Lieutenant George Thomas Bridson (4064812).
- Flight Lieutenant Charles John Broom (1339174).
- Flight Lieutenant George Herbert Carter, AFC, (195846).
- Flight Lieutenant Robert Edward Alexander Driver (700880).
- Flight Lieutenant John William Arnold Elias (4037885).
- Flight Lieutenant John Frank Squire Finnis (165874).
- Flight Lieutenant Bedrich Froehlich (195364).
- Flight Lieutenant John Eldrick George (2449240), (Retired).
- Flight Lieutenant Leslie Meadows (1567637).
- Flight Lieutenant John Patrick Hugh O'Neill (2443722).
- Flight Lieutenant Frederick George Ritchie (57051).
- Flight Lieutenant Michael Arthur Sproule (62338).
- Flight Lieutenant Josef Vaclav Stivar (184654).
- Flight Lieutenant Arthur Frederick Sunderland-Cooper (39694).
- Flight Lieutenant Owen George Thomas (167461).
- Flight Lieutenant Joseph Alfred Windust, AFM, (1800374).
- Flight Lieutenant Ronald Charles Wood (607161).
- Flying Officer Warren John Henson (1587437).
- Flying Officer Anthony Brian Kennedy (4142522).
- Flying Officer William Stevenson Lamont (990663).
- Flying Officer Raymond Woollett (2419875).
- Master Pilot Reginald William Drown (1190809).
- Master Pilot Frederick John Loveridge, AFM, (1322449).
- Master Navigator Roy Thomas Dyer (1602176).
- Master Engineer James Howat Laurie (1366388).
- 2204133 Flight Sergeant Jack Palliser.
- 4034938 Sergeant John Dudley James.

=== Queen's Police Medal (QPM) ===
England and Wales

- Herman Rutherford, Chief Constable, Surrey Constabulary.
- Lieutenant-Colonel William Jones Williams, OBE, Chief Constable, Gwynedd Constabulary.
- Richard Wilbraham Walker, Chief Constable, Eastbourne Borough Police.
- Neil Galbraith, Chief Constable, Monmouthshire Constabulary.
- Alan Evans, MBE, Assistant Chief Constable, Derbyshire Constabulary.
- Gordon Watson Brown, Assistant Chief Constable, Northumberland Constabulary.
- George Henry Hodges, Chief Superintendent, Essex Constabulary.
- George Metcalfe, MBE, Chief Superintendent, West Riding Constabulary.
- Alexander George Campbell Findlay, Chief Superintendent, Metropolitan Police.
- George Amos Todd, MBE, Chief Superintendent, Lincolnshire Constabulary.
- William Charles Francis Best, Chief Superintendent, Metropolitan Police.
- Joshua Winn, BEM, Superintendent (Grade 1), Metropolitan Police.

Scotland

- Alexander Murray, Superintendent, Lanarkshire Constabulary.
- Robert James Gunn, Superintendent, Dunbartonshire Constabulary.

Northern Ireland

- William Alexander Craig Porter, Sergeant, Royal Ulster Constabulary.

State of New South Wales

- Cecil Stanley Jardine, Superintendent 3rd Class, New South Wales Police Force.
- Matthew William Dill Macky Grabbling, Superintendent 3rd Class, New South Wales Police Force.
- James Hector Rogers, Superintendent 3rd Class, New South Wales Police Force.
- Arthur Norbert Carmichael, Superintendent 3rd Class, New South Wales Police Force.
- Milton Thomas Emerson, Superintendent 3rd Class, New South Wales Police Force.
- Harold John Layburn, Inspector 1st Class, New South Wales Police Force.

Southern Rhodesia

- Ernest James Lennox, Assistant Commissioner, British South Africa Police.

Overseas Territories

- Donald Matheson, Commissioner of Police, British Guiana.
- James Hector Macdonald Williams, MBE, Superintendent of Police, Cyprus.
- Thomas Paterson McBrierley, Assistant Commissioner of Police, Kenya.
- Dennis William Humphrey, Assistant Commissioner of Police, Northern Rhodesia.
- James Steven Bell, DFC, Senior Superintendent of Police, Federation of Nigeria.
- George Thomas Whitmore Carr, Deputy Commissioner of Police, Trinidad.

=== Queen's Fire Services Medal (QFSM) ===
England and Wales

- Charles William Tharby, Chief Officer, West Ham Fire Brigade.
- Horace Edward Barnes, Divisional Officer, Cheshire Fire Brigade.
- Thomas Jack Edgar, Divisional Officer, West Riding of Yorkshire Fire Brigade.
- Cyril James Goad, OBE, Chief Officer, Gloucestershire Fire Brigade.
- Henry Arthur Edgerley, MBE, Chief Officer, Warrington Fire Brigade.

=== Colonial Police Medal (CPM) ===
Southern Rhodesia

- Chombe, Detective Station Sergeant, British South Africa Police.
- Lawrence Edward Davenport, Chief Inspector, British South Africa Police.
- Henry Kenneth Allfrey Gaitskell, Superintendent, British South Africa Police.
- Gandidzanwa, Station Sergeant, British South Africa Police.
- Alan Roger Godwin, Superintendent, British South Africa Police.
- Nombolo, First Class Sergeant, British South Africa Police.
- Peter Dennis Wray Richards Sherren, Superintendent, British South Africa Police.

Basutoland

- Captain Arthur Reuben Kennedy, Superintendent, Basutoland Mounted Police.
- Charles Lehlabaphiri, Inspector, Basutoland Mounted Police.

Overseas Territories

- Pancrass Michael Arrumm, Acting Chief Inspector, Kenya Police Force.
- Nasser Abdullah Audhali, Chief Inspector, Aden Police Force.
- Winifred Theodora Barker, Superintendent (W), Cyprus Police Force.
- James William Breen, Deputy Superintendent, Aden Police Force.
- Georgina Mary Ruth Gamier, Chief Inspector (W), Kenya Police Force.
- Arthur Simpson Kingsbury Cook, Senior Assistant Commissioner, Uganda Police Force.
- Roy Cousins, Inspector, Kenya Police Force.
- David Leonard Bonnar Davies, Superintendent, Nigeria Police Force.
- Dandeson Doherty, Chief Inspector, Sierra Leone Police Force.
- Dublin anak Sijur, Chief Inspector, Sarawak Police Force.
- Eric Arthur Edmeades, MC, Acting Superintendent, Sarawak Police Force.
- Edet Asuguo Ekpo, Acting Assistant Superintendent, Nigeria Police Force.
- John Harold Ellen, Senior Superintendent, Sierra Leone Police Force.
- Albert William John Eyers, Superintendent, Tanganyika Police Force.
- Ahmed Fadhl, Inspector, Aden Police Force.
- Jama Farah, Chief Inspector, Somaliland Police Force.
- Semei Gitta, Head Constable, Uganda Police Force.
- Chandrabahadur Gurung, Chief Inspector, Singapore Police Force.
- Ernest Cornelius Van Helden, Deputy Commandant, Auxiliary Police, Hong Kong Police Force.
- John Henry Holley, MBE, Chief of Police, Grenada Police Force.
- William Holmes, Assistant Superintendent, Kenya Police Force.
- Arthur Hughes Jenkins, Senior Superintendent, British Guiana Police Force.
- Eric Hudson Jones, Superintendent, Somaliland Police Force.
- Zephaniah Alphonso Joseph, Acting Assistant Superintendent, Leeward Islands Police Force.
- Mohamed Sitar Khan, Acting Chief Inspector, Kenya Police Force.
- Charles Oliver Alfred Lawrence, Assistant Superintendent, Kenya Police Force.
- William Henry Martin, Superintendent, Uganda Police Force.
- Graham Alexander Michael, Superintendent, Cyprus Police Force.
- Kenneth George Michael, Acting Inspector, Leeward Islands Police Force.
- Mok King Wing, Superintendent of Police (Reserve), Hong Kong Police Force.
- Muslim bin Abu Bakar, Detective Staff Sergeant, Singapore Police Force.
- Mwalilino, Inspector, Northern Rhodesia Police Force.
- Sabito Nasoro, Detective Sergeant Major, Tanganyika Police Force.
- Morgan Numan, Sergeant-Major, Nigeria Police Force.
- Leo Okola, Sergeant, Tanganyika Police Force.
- Ong Kim Eng, Chief Driver, Singapore Fire Brigade.
- Jack Horace Kyriakos Pappas, Senior Superintendent, Nigeria Police Force.
- Pei Hua Li, Staff Sergeant, Hong Kong Police Force.
- Theophilus Carlton Phillips, Inspector, Trinidad Police Force.
- Horace Bartlett Philpott, Superintendent, Northern Rhodesia Police Force.
- Roy Eric Michael Proust, Senior Superintendent, Somaliland Police Force.
- Ramalingham, s/o Govindan, Detective Sub-Inspector, Singapore Police Force.
- Demosthenis Constantinou Rigas, Assistant Superintendent, Cyprus Police Force.
- Melville Ekundayo Kushika Roberts, Superintendent, Nigeria Police Force.
- Kasim Saiba, Sergeant, Tanganyika Police Force.
- Walter Burns Scragg, Superintendent, Hong Kong Police Force.
- David Bryce Smith, Superintendent, Hong Kong Police Force.
- Laurence Smith, Superintendent, Uganda Police Force.
- George Subeti, Chief Inspector, Tanganyika Police Force.
- Tan Khye Hong, Detective Sub-Inspector, Singapore Police Force.
- Arthur Herbert Turner, Chief Inspector, Cyprus Police Force.
- Ronald Willey, Superintendent, Cyprus Police Force.
- John Sayers Wilson, Inspector, Bermuda Police Force.
- Ernest George Wright, GM, Senior Superintendent, Kenya Police Force.
- Yau Kwong, Sergeant, Hong Kong Police Force.
- Pangalos Victor Zachariades, Assistant Fire Officer, Cyprus Police Fire Brigade.

== Australia ==
=== Knight Bachelor ===
- Lewis Charles Burne, CBE, AFC, Federal President of the Australian Council of Employers' Federations, and a member of the Governing Body of the International Labour Organization.
- The Honourable Walter Jackson Cooper, MBE, Commonwealth Minister for Repatriation.
- John Grenfell Crawford, CBE, Secretary, Department of Trade.
- Russell John Dumas, CMG, of Dalkeith, Western Australia. For public services.
- Patrick Silvesta McGovern, CBE, Commissioner of Taxation.
- Arthur William Morrow, DSO, ED, MB, FRCP, Honorary Physician, Royal Prince Alfred Hospital, Sydney. For services to medicine.

=== Order of the Bath ===
==== Companion of the Order of the Bath (CB) ====
Military Division

- Rear-Admiral Henry Mackay Burrell, CBE, Royal Australian Navy.

=== Order of Saint Michael and Saint George ===
==== Companion of the Order of St Michael and St George (CMG) ====
- William Sydney Jones, of Toorak, Victoria. For public services.
- Mervyn Napier Waller, OBE, of Ivanhoe, Victoria. For services to Art.
- Professor Hugh Colin Webster, of Queensland University, a prominent physicist. For services to the Federal Government.

=== Order of the British Empire ===
==== Knight Commander of the Order of the British Empire (KBE) ====
Military Division

- Lieutenant-General Alwyn Ragnar Garrett, CB, CBE, (2/10), Chief of the General Staff, Australian Military Forces.

Civil Division

- Marcus Laurence Elwin Oliphant, Director of the School of Research in Physical Sciences, National University, Canberra.
- Senator the Honourable Neil O'Sullivan, Attorney-General, and Vice-President of the Executive Council, Commonwealth of Australia, 1956–1958.

==== Commander of the Order of the British Empire (CBE) ====
Military Division

- Major-General (temporary) Leonard John Bruton, OBE, (2/18), Australian Staff Corps.
- Brigadier Arthur Peter Chapman, OBE, (4/35252), General List, Australian Citizen Military Forces.
- Air Commodore Redmond Forrest Michael Green, DSO, Royal Australian Air Force.

Civil Division

- William Alan Stewart Butement, OBE, Chief Scientist, Department of Supply.
- Peter Richard Heydon, High Commissioner for the Commonwealth of Australia in India.
- John Garling Hurley, of Pymble, New South Wales. For services to Commerce and Industry.
- John Alexander James, OBE, MB, FRCS, of Braddon, Australian Capital Territory. For services to the community.
- Charles Denton Kemp, Director, Institute of Public Affairs, Victoria.
- Thomas Arthur Lang, Associate Commissioner of the Snowy Mountains Hydro-Electric Authority.
- Maurice Alan Edgar Mawby, of Canterbury, Victoria. For services to Industry.
- Gerald Packer, of Brighton, Victoria. For services to the Federal Government.
- Albert Allan Tregear, Clerk of the House of Representatives.

==== Officer of the Order of the British Empire (OBE) ====
Military Division

- Acting Commander Herbert Logan Gunn, DSC, Royal Australian Navy.
- Lieutenant-Colonel Edward Fawcett Aitken, ED, (3/37680), Australian Staff Corps.
- Colonel (temporary) Oliver David Jackson (2/111), Australian Staff Corps.
- Lieutenant-Colonel (temporary) Kenneth George Mosher, ED, (2/78999), Australian Staff Corps.
- Group Captain John Fullerton Lush, Royal Australian Air Force.
- Wing Commander Leonard Bacon (03305), Royal Australian Air Force.

Civil Division

- The Right Reverend Francis de Witt Batty, formerly Anglican Bishop of Newcastle, New South Wales. For services to the Church of England in Australia.
- Commander Rowland Griffiths Bowen, Royal Australian Navy (Retired), Australian Registrar and Priory Secretary of the Order of St. John of Jerusalem.
- Captain John Chapman, Assistant General Manager, Australian National Airlines Commission.
- Benjamin Foley, of Ascot, Queensland. For services to primary industry.
- Percival Dicey Forrest, JP, Dwalganup Estate, via Boyup Brook, Western Australia. For services to Agriculture.
- Alfred John Gibb, of Upper Sturt, South Australia. For services to Commerce and Industry.
- Annie Eileen, Lady Hudson, of Cooma, New South Wales. For services rendered in connection with the Snowy Mountains enterprise.
- Jasper Patrick Norton, of Capel, Western Australia. For services to the dairying industry.
- John Xavier O'Driscoll, of Hawthorn, Victoria. For services to Sport.
- Augustus Wharton Paul, Deputy Director-General of Social Services.
- Robert Thomas Rush, of Hawthorn, Victoria, in recognition of his services to Australian football.
- Lilian Avis Scantlebury, Vice-chairman, Australian Red Cross Society.
- Kenneth Slessor, of Elizabeth Bay, New South Wales. For services to Australian literature.
- Clive Caldwell Smith, Director of Posts and Telegraphs, New South Wales.
- Herbert Velvin Smith, of Batlow, New South Wales. For services to the fruit and canning industry of Australia.
- Cyril Joseph Tonkin, MB, BS, of Toorak, Victoria, a prominent physician.

==== Member of the Order of the British Empire (MBE) ====
Military Division

- Shipwright Lieutenant-Commander William John Garland, Royal Australian Navy.
- Major Clarence Herbert Morton (2/37583), Royal Australian Army Ordnance Corps.
- Captain (Quartermaster) Robert Glanville Nettleton (3/303), Royal Corps of Australian Electrical and Mechanical Engineers.
- Major Keith William Norris (2/158011), Royal Australian Engineers.
- Major William Vernon Routley (3/37518), Australian Staff Corps.
- 2/2585 Warrant Officer Class I Horace John Silk, Royal Australian Infantry Corps.
- Major Lionel Bernard Sprenger (3/37628), Royal Australian Army Survey Corps.
- Captain Charles Trevor Stanford, MM, (3/92042), Royal Australian Infantry Corps.
- Major James Kelvin Tweedie Watson, ED, (6/15236), Royal Australian Engineers.
- Flight Lieutenant Albert Jack Holden (031556), Royal Australian Air Force.
- Warrant Officer Hector William Godfrey Dean (A211), Royal Australian Air Force.
- Warrant Officer Harry Lionel Gregg (A31562), Royal Australian Air Force.

Civil Division

- Charles Edward Arnold, Secretary of the High Council of Commonwealth Public Service Organisations.
- The Reverend Mother Mary Benedicta, of the Order of Our Lady of the Sacred Heart, East Arm Settlement, Northern Territory.
- George John Bland, JP, of Wyalong, New South Wales. For public and charitable services.
- Nellie Victoria Brown, of Neutral Bay, New South Wales. For services in the cause of immigration to Australia.
- Elizabeth Annis Burton, of Coogee, New South Wales. For services to various charitable and patriotic causes.
- Arthur Calder, Group Engineer, Postmaster-General's Department, Sydney.
- Richard Joseph Casey, Principal of the Postal Training School in Victoria.
- Leo Gladstone Cooney, a member of the staff of the Department of Civil Aviation.
- Stanley Henry Crawford, lately Secretary, Australian National Airlines Commission.
- Minard Finard Crommelin, of Pearl Beach, New South Wales, in recognition of her efforts to preserve the flora and fauna of the Australian bushland.
- Clarice Sylvia Docker, of Kallista, Victoria, in recognition of her contribution to the profession of occupational therapy.
- Albert Edward Griffin, Collector of Customs, Queensland.
- Charles Albert Kendall, of West Perth, Western Australia. For public services.
- Wilfred Harold King, Director, Joint Intelligence Bureau, Department of Defence.
- John Patrick Leahy, JP, of Corowa, New South Wales. For charitable services.
- William Edward Mann, Area Finance Officer, Department of Air, Melbourne.
- Thomas Maxwell, of Moonah, Tasmania. For services rendered on behalf of disabled ex-servicemen.
- Joseph Henry McDougall, of Ashfield, New South Wales. For services on behalf of returned ex-servicemen.
- John Olaf Nelson, Federal President of the Council of Friendly Societies of Australia.
- The Reverend Esmond Walter New, of Echuca, Victoria. For public services.
- Ivan Edgar Newnham, Principal Research Officer of the Division of Industrial Chemistry, Commonwealth Scientific and Industrial Research Organisations.
- Linda Moore Northcott, of Mosman, New South Wales. For charitable services to the community.
- Alfred Jack Northey, formerly Honorary National Secretary and Treasurer of the Association of Apex Clubs.
- Audley Alfred Percy, President of the Australian Association of Teachers of the Blind.
- Richard Rowland Quarmby, Protocol Officer, Department of External Affairs, Sydney.
- Albert Schofield, Manager, Returned Soldiers' Woollen Mill, Geelong, Victoria.
- Gwendoline Linda Stahl, of Mont Albert, Victoria. For services to International House.
- George Harold Vivian, in recognition of his services to the Naval Branch, Department of the Navy.
- Doreen Ivy Wackett, President, Air Force Women's Association.
- Richard Clayton Wardle, Registrar of the Diocese of Melbourne.
- Winifred Ethel Clara Watson, a member of the staff of the Australian High Commissioner's Office in London.

=== British Empire Medal (BEM) ===
Military Division

- 3/1065 Bombardier Gordon Norman Fort, Royal Australian Artillery.
- 4/699 Warrant Officer Class II (temporary) Norman Heaton Hollingdrake, Royal Australian Army Service Corps.
- 2/5048 Sergeant (temporary) Frank Watkins, Royal Australian Army Service Corps.
- 2/71034 Sergeant Villiers Ernest Webb, Royal Australian Infantry Corps.
- 5/9469 Staff-Sergeant Horace Henry Wells, Royal Australian Engineers.
- 2/111265 Warrant Officer Class II (temporary) Donald Jeffrey Wheeler, Royal Australian Artillery.
- 1/1563 Warrant Officer Class II (temporary) Conrad Alan Williams, Royal Australian Army Medical Corps.
- A459 Flight Sergeant John Francis Benck, Royal Australian Air Force.
- A4276 Corporal Ivan Ray Vater, Royal Australian Air Force.
- A21366 Leading Aircraftman John Walcott, Royal Australian Air Force.

Civil Division

- Walter Dunn, Car Driver, Commonwealth Public Service.
- Andrew John Bruce Kelso, Radio Operator, Snowy Mountains Hydro-Electric Authority, Cooma, New South Wales.
- Murdo McMillan, Plant Operator, Snowy Mountains Hydro-Electric Authority, Cooma, New South Wales.
- Leszek Matuszewski, Instrument Man, Field and Construction Surveys, Snowy Mountains Hydro-Electric Authority, Cooma, New South Wales.
- Jozef Stefan Morgan, Diamond Driller, Snowy Mountains Hydro-Electric Authority, Cooma, New South Wales.

=== Royal Red Cross (RRC) ===
==== Associate of the Royal Red Cross (ARRC) ====
- Major Florence Welch (F5/11), Royal Australian Army Nursing Corps.

=== Air Force Cross (AFC) ===
- Squadron Leader Raymond Frederick Drury (022125), Royal Australian Air Force.
- Flight Lieutenant Kenneth James Murray, DFC, DFM, (022790), Royal Australian Air Force.
- Flying Officer Neil Raymond Lang (022126), Royal Australian Air Force.

=== Queen's Commendation for Valuable Service in the Air ===
- Squadron Leader Victor Benjamine Cannon, DFC, (022094), Royal Australian Air Force.

== Ghana ==
=== Order of the British Empire ===
==== Commander of the Order of the British Empire (CBE) ====
Civil Division

- Arthur Lewin Alexander, formerly Commissioner of Police, Ghana.

==== Officer of the Order of the British Empire (OBE) ====
Civil Division

- Peter Holmes Canham, formerly Permanent Secretary, Administrative Service, Ghana.
- James Broom Millar, MBE, Director of Broadcasting, Ghana.

==== Member of the Order of the British Empire (MBE) ====
Military Division

- S/57478 Warrant Officer Class I Clement Edwin Langman, Royal Army Service Corps; seconded to the Ghana Army.
- 823559 Warrant Officer Class II Francis John de Moulan Lawrence, The Sherwood Foresters (Nottinghamshire and Derbyshire Regiment); seconded to the Ghana Army.
- Major Peter Pain Stancliffe (63672), The Cheshire Regiment; seconded to the Ghana Army.

Civil Division

- Margaret Gibson Agnew, formerly Chief Nursing Officer, Ministry of Health, Ghana.

=== Queen's Police Medal (QPM) ===
- John Frederick George Coles, Assistant Commissioner of Police, Ghana.

== Rhodesia and Nyasaland ==
=== Order of the British Empire ===
==== Commander of the Order of the British Empire (CBE) ====
Civil Division

- Michael Gelfand, OBE, MD, FRCP, Physician to Salisbury Hospital, Southern Rhodesia. For services to Medicine in the Federation.
- Henry McLorinan McDowell, Secretary to the Federal Treasury.
- Basil Maurice de Quehen, MVO, Director of the Federal Intelligence and Security Bureau.

==== Officer of the Order of the British Empire (OBE) ====
Civil Division

- Isidore Rowland Rosin, MD, FRCS.Ed., a Medical Practitioner of Salisbury, Southern Rhodesia. For services to Medicine in the Federation.
- Lieutenant-Colonel Norman Oswald Earl-Spurr, Federal Military Forces (Retired). For public services to the Federation.
- James Watson Swan. For public and political services in the Federation.
- Wilfred Watson, a member of the Federal Immigration Selection Board.

==== Member of the Order of the British Empire (MBE) ====
Civil Division

- William Robert Fulton. For services to Sport, particularly Boxing, in the Federation.
- Leslie Arthur Heatlie, formerly Senior Superintendent, Northern Rhodesia Police, seconded to the Federal Government Service.
- Kenneth William Hobson, Secretary to the Association of Chambers of Commerce for Rhodesia and Nyasaland.
- Frank Greenwood Jackson, a member of the teaching staff of the Federal Ministry of Education.
- Walter Sinclair Kennedy, DFC, AFC, Chief Aerodromes Officer, Federal Department of Civil Aviation.
- Kenneth Charles Watts, Assistant Engineer at Lusaka of the Federal Ministry of Posts.
