= Peter Brinson =

British writer (1920–1995)

Peter Neilson Brinson (6 March 1920 – 7 April 1995) was a British writer and lecturer on dance. At various times he was a film-maker, writer, and academic, and did much to raise the profile of dance education in Britain and elsewhere.

== Biography ==
Peter Neilson Brinson, who was born in Llandudno, Wales, on 6 March 1920, was educated at Denstone College, Staffordshire, and then studied Philosophy, Politics and Economics (PPE) at Keble College, Oxford. He matriculated at the University of Oxford in 1938, but did not graduate until 1948, as he served in the Royal Armoured Corps during the Second World War, reaching the rank of captain; he was a tank commander with Montgomery at the Battle of El Alamein. Immediately post-war he served with the 3rd Kings Own Hussars in Palestine as a Major. After leaving Oxford, he worked for the London Film Centre, writing film scripts and carrying out research. His involvement with ballet dated from his time at the centre. In 1952, The Black Swan, which he wrote and produced and which starred Beryl Grey and John Field from the Royal Ballet, was the first ballet film to use stereoscope.

In 1964 Brinson set up "Ballet for All", a small touring group of the Royal Ballet companies, which performed widely across the country to introduce ballet to many people of all ages. The performances were theme-based demonstrations performed in costume, including titles such as The Birth of the Royal Ballet and Two Coppelias. There were on average 150 performances per year reaching around 70,000 people. "Ballet for All" closed in 1979. In 1970 he published, with Clement Crisp, a book also titled Ballet for All and he made seven programmes on video based on his original scripts.

He was linked to the work of the London School of Contemporary Dance, as his interests were wider than ballet. He went on to become director of the Royal Academy of Dancing (1968) and director of the UK and Commonwealth branch of the Calouste Gulbenkian Foundation from 1972 to 1992, continuing his work in promoting the arts. He was an academic at York University, Toronto, and the Laban Centre for Movement and Dance at Goldsmiths' College, London, and his work also led to the foundation of the first chair of dance studies at a British university, at the University of Surrey, from whom he received an honorary Doctorate of the University in 1994. He has been credited as "playing a leading role in transforming the nature and status of dance education in Britain and many other parts of the world."

Brinson wrote for a number of publications about dance, and wrote several books; he also wrote on the themes of art and public policy. He was a freelance writer for The Times and for magazines specialising in dance from 1952 onwards, He co-authored The Choreographic Art (1963) with a future director of the Australian Ballet, Peggy van Praagh. Influential reports he commissioned at the Gulbenkian Foundation included The Arts Britain Ignores (1976) by Naseem Khan. and The Arts in Schools (1982), edited by Ken Robinson (educationalist).

Brinson developed myelofibrosis, and after being diagnosed in 1988 he required numerous blood transfusions – although he made the most of the time these took, and used the time to read and write without interruption. He died on 7 April 1995.

== Archives ==
Peter Brinson left his professional papers to the Laban Archive held at Trinity Laban Conservatoire of Music and Dance.
