= John Hart (dancer) =

John Hart CBE
- Born: Francis John Hart; 4 July 1921; London, England
- Died: 8 February 2015 (aged 93); Salt Lake City, Utah, U.S.
- Occupations: Ballet dancer; choreographer; artistic director
- Years active: 1938–1997
- Spouse: Ann Howard (before 2015)
- Parents: Frank L. Hart; Ivy Hart
- Awards: RAD Adeline Genée Medal; Queen Elizabeth II Coronation Award (1970)

Francis John Hart CBE (4 July 1921 – 8 February 2015), was an English ballet dancer, choreographer and artistic director of Ballet West from 1986 to 1997.

== Early life ==
Francis John Hart was born in London on 4 July 1921, the son of Frank L. Hart and Ivy Hart. He trained at the Royal Academy of Dancing with Judith Espinosa. He was awarded the RAD Adeline Genée Medal. In 1938, he joined the Vic-Wells Ballet, dancing lead roles by the age of 21.

== Career ==
He created a role in Ninette de Valois' 1940 The Prospect Before Us, before leaving to serve in the Royal Air Force from 1942 to 1946. He returned as a principal dancer, creating roles in Frederick Ashton's Sylvia (1952) and Homage to the Queen (1953). In 1955, Hart was appointed ballet master, and was assistant director of the Royal Ballet from 1962 to 1970. He resigned in 1970, and took up a position as head of the dance division of the United States International University. In 1972 he served as artistic director of PACT Ballet. His last major position was as artistic director of Salt Lake City’s Ballet West from 1986 to 1997.

== Honours ==
Hart received the Queen Elizabeth II Coronation Award of the Royal Academy of Dance in 1970, and was made a Commander of the Order of the British Empire (CBE) in the 1971 New Year Honours.

== Personal life ==
Hart married Ann Howard, a former coryphée of the Royal Ballet. He enjoyed fine art, collected stamps, and had a "fondness for epicurean delights". He died in Salt Lake City on 8 February 2015.
