= Queen Elizabeth II Coronation Award =

UK dance award

- Awarded for: Contributions to ballet and dance
- Country: United Kingdom
- Presented by: Royal Academy of Dance
- First award: 1953
- Website: http://www.rad.org.uk

The Queen Elizabeth II Coronation Award is an honour presented annually by the Royal Academy of Dance, to people who have made a significant contribution to the ballet and dance industry. The award was instituted by Dame Adeline Genee in 1953, to mark the coronation of Queen Elizabeth II and her appointment as Royal Patron of the Academy. The first winner of the award was Dame Ninette de Valois, founder of the Royal Ballet, Birmingham Royal Ballet and Royal Ballet School. The award has since been presented to a number of notable people, and is recognised as the highest honour awarded by the Academy.

== Winners ==
The award was shared in 1963, 1966 and 2009, and in 2014 was awarded to a ballet company, rather than an individual. The full list of winners is:available at the RAD website.

- 1954 - Ninette de Valois
- 1955 - Tamara Karsavina
- 1956 - Marie Rambert
- 1957 - Anton Dolin
- 1958 - Phyllis Bedells
- 1959 - Frederick Ashton
- 1960 - Robert Helpmann
- 1961 - Ursula Moreton
- 1962 - Cyril Beaumont
- 1963 - Phillip J. S. Richardson (posthumously)
- 1963 - Alicia Markova
- 1964 - Kathleen Gordon
- 1965 - Peggy van Praagh
- 1966 - Serge Grigorieff
- 1966 - Lubov Tchernicheva
- 1967 - Lydia Sokolova
- 1968 - Stanislas Idzikowski
- 1969 - John Hart
- 1970 - John Gilpin
- 1971 - Louise Browne
- 1972 - Ruth French
- 1973 - Norman Morrice
- 1974 - Brian Shaw
- 1975 - Robin Howard
- 1976 - Pamela May
- 1977 - Winifred Edwards
- 1978 - Kenneth MacMillan
- 1979 - Arnold Haskell
- 1980 - Glen Tetley
- 1981 - Michael Somes
- 1982 - Merle Park
- 1983 - Rudolf Nureyev
- 1984 - Leslie Edwards
- 1985 - Antony Tudor
- 1986 - Rudolf Benesh
- 1986 - Joan Benesh
- 1987 - Peter Darrell
- 1988 - John Lanchbery
- 1989 - Mary Clarke
- 1990 - Peter Wright
- 1991 - Ivor Forbes Guest
- 1992 - Clement Crisp
- 1993 - Julia Farron
- 1994 - Anthony Dowell
- 1995 - Beryl Grey
- 1996 - Irina Baronova
- 1998 - Anya Linden, Lady Sainsbury
- 1999 - Maina Gielgud
- 2000 - Gillian Lynne
- 2003 - Princess Margaret, Countess of Snowdon (posthumously)
- 2005 - John Tooley
- 2007 - Alexander Grant
- 2009 - Victor Hochhauser
- 2009 - Lilian Hochhauser
- 2010 - Rachel Cameron
- 2011 - Monica Mason
- 2012 - Antoinette Sibley
- 2014 - The Royal Ballet
- 2016 - Matthew Bourne
- 2018 - Carlos Acosta
- 2019 - Karen Kain
- 2021 - David McAllister
- 2022 - Mikhail Baryshnikov
