= Sabrina Matthews =

Canadian ballet choreographer (born 1977)

- Born: 1977 (age 48–49); Toronto, Ontario, Canada
- Education: National Ballet School of Canada
- Known for: Ballet Choreographers

Sabrina Matthews (born 1977) is a Canadian ballet choreographer. She has choreographed pieces for prestigious ballet companies around the world, including Stuttgart Ballet, Royal Swedish Ballet, Boston Ballet, Royal Academy of Dance's Genée International Ballet Competition, and the National Ballet of Canada. Her choreography has been performed internationally in Canada, the United States, Spain, Sweden, Germany, Italy, and Netherlands. In 2008, Chatelaine magazine recognized Matthews as one of Canada's Amazing Women to Watch.

== Biography ==
Sabrina Matthews is a Toronto, Ontario, Canada native and a graduate of the National Ballet School of Canada, attending from 1987–1995. From 1995–2005, she was a leading soloist and aspiring choreographer with the Alberta Ballet Company under artistic directors Mikko Nissinen and Jean Grand-Maître. During this time, Matthews performed in several ballet tours across four continents. Her choreography and dance films have received national and international awards, including a 2008 PACE Award, a 2006 Ballet VIP Honorable Mention from Pointe Magazine, the 1995 Peter Dwyer Award, a 2005 Clifford E. Lee Choreography Award, and a 2003 nomination from the Alberta Motion Picture Industries Association for the 2002 Bravo!FACT short film Dance to This.

In 2006, after Matthews choreographed pieces for the Alberta Ballet Company and the New York Choreographic Institute on the School of American Ballet, Stuttgart Ballet artistic director Reid Anderson invited her to attend the Noverre Society; a program for young choreographers to create and present their original works. While there, she created soles, which earned positive reviews among German critics. The piece was included as part of Stuttgart Ballet's repertoire and was reprised during Stuttgart's December Gala. Matthews' success in the Noverre Society led to ballet companies commissioning her for choreography. She ended her dance career early and pursued choreography full-time.

Since then, Matthews has created pieces for the National Ballet of Canada and a second piece for Stuttgart Ballet, all of which have been reprised. In 2008, Matthews created a piece for the Royal Academy of Dance's Genée International Ballet Competition. She also created a new piece, quondam, in 2008 for the Royal Swedish Ballet, which has since been reprised in 2009 and 2010. Matthews made her United States debut in March 2008 with ein von viel at the Boston Ballet to critical praise. ein von viel has been performed by three ballet companies for a total of eight reprisals in four countries.

In addition to working with major international ballet companies, Matthews works closely with her alma mater, Canada's National Ballet School. She also choreographed a figure skating solo for four-time world figure-skating champion Kurt Browning, and works for television in North America and Europe, including choreography for the television dance competition So You Think You Can Dance Canada.

== Choreographed work ==
All pieces are world premieres unless otherwise indicated.

=== Stuttgart Ballet ===
- soles (2006)
- veil (May 4, 2008)

=== Royal Swedish Ballet ===
- quondam (November 7, 2008)

=== Boston Ballet ===
- ein von viel (March 6-9, 2008) - U.S. premiere

=== National Ballet of Canada ===
- clearing (2007)
- veer (2008) - Originally commissioned for the 2007 Erik Bruhn Competition
- DEXTRIS (March, 2009)
- In Peril (February, 2011) - Stuttgart Ballet's 50th Anniversary Gala

=== National Ballet School (Canada) ===
- Sequentia (May, 2009)

=== Alberta Ballet ===
- delude (2000)
- ein von viel (2001)
- transience (2002)
- unbound (2003)
- fallen arm (2004)
- losing ground (2005)

=== Competitions and festivals ===
- Dance to This (2002) Bravo!FACT short film - 2002 Calgary International Film Festival, 2003 Brooklyn International Film Festival, and 2005 Constellation Change Screen Dance Festival
- unbound (2001) - Beijing International Dance Festival
- Rodin (2005) - Glenbow Museum
- veer (2007) - Erik Bruhn Competition (Not performed due to injury)
- clearing (2007) - Canada Day Celebration in Ottawa, Canada
- monas (August 2008) - Genée International Ballet Competition

== Awards and recognition ==
- 1994 Peter Dwyer Award (Canada Council for the Arts/National Ballet School) - Excellence in Dance
- Nominated for the 2003 Alberta Motion Picture Industries Association Awards - Dance to This
- 2005 Clifford E. Lee Award (Banff Centre for the Arts) - Choreography
- Honorable mention in 2006 Pointe Magazine - Ballet VIP
- 2008 Alberta Provincial Awards Celebrating Excellence (Banff Centre) - Outstanding Alumnus
- 2008 Chatelaine magazine - Canada's Amazing Women to Watch
