= Bedells =

Bedells is a surname. Notable people with the surname include:

- Jean Bedells (1924–2014), British ballet dancer, daughter of Phyllis
- Phyllis Bedells (1893–1985), British ballerina and dance teacher
