= Job: A Masque for Dancing =

Ballet by Ralph Vaughan Williams

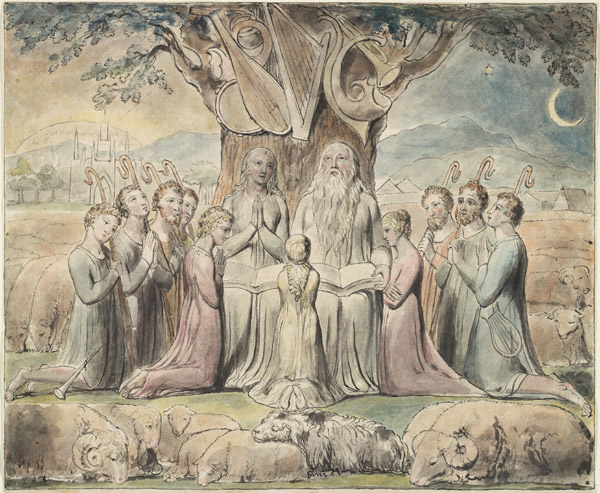
- One of William Blake's illustrations on which the ballet is based
- Choreographer: Ninette de Valois
- Music: Ralph Vaughan Williams
- Libretto: Geoffrey Keynes
- Based on: Book of Job, illustrated by William Blake
- Premiere: 5 July 1931; Cambridge Theatre, London
- Original ballet company: Carmago Society
- Design: Gwen Raverat

Job: A Masque for Dancing is a one-act ballet produced in 1931. The scenario is by Geoffrey Keynes, the choreography by Ninette de Valois, and the music by Ralph Vaughan Williams. The ballet is based on the Book of Job from the Hebrew Bible and was inspired by the illustrated edition by William Blake. The music was first given in concert in 1930 and the ballet had its stage premiere on 5 July 1931. It was the first ballet to be produced by an entirely British creative team. It was taken into the repertoire of the Vic-Wells Ballet and its successors, and has been intermittently revived.

== Background ==
In 1927, the centenary of the death of William Blake, Geoffrey Keynes, a leading Blake scholar and also a dance enthusiast, wrote the scenario for "a ballet of a kind which would be new to the English stage", based on Blake's illustrations for the Book of Job, published in 1826. Helped by his wife’s sister, the designer Gwen Raverat, Keynes selected eight of Blake's 21 illustrations as suitable for stage adaptation. They then approached Raverat’s cousin Ralph Vaughan Williams to write the music. He agreed, and was so enthusiastic about the idea that he pressed ahead with composition before Keynes and Raverat completed their work.

Meanwhile, Keynes offered the scenario to the impresario Sergei Diaghilev of the Ballets Russes, who turned it down as "too English and too old-fashioned". Vaughan Williams was not displeased by this. He had a low opinion of classical ballet, detested dance en pointe, and regarded Diaghilev's troupe as "decadent and frivolous". He felt they would have made "an unholy mess" of the piece. He so disliked ballet that he insisted that the work should be labelled "a masque for dancing", although the critic Frank Howes, who admired the composer greatly, pointed out that the essence of a masque is that it is a combination of all the arts of the theatre, and "without songs and dialogues a masque is not a masque but a pantomime".

After Diaghilev's rejection of the piece, the Keynes brothers – Geoffrey and Maynard – together with the composer Thomas Dunhill agreed to fund a staging of the work by the recently formed Camargo Society. The orchestral score was by this time complete, and was premiered by the Queen's Hall Orchestra conducted by the composer at the Norwich Festival on 23 October 1930. Vaughan Williams had written for a large orchestra, too big for a West End theatre pit, and Constant Lambert undertook a reduction of the score for smaller forces. Ninette de Valois was engaged as choreographer. She and her employer, Lilian Baylis of the Old Vic, had seen and approved the Raverat designs. Job was the first ballet to be produced by an entirely British creative team.

== Premiere ==
On Sunday 5 July 1931 the ballet was performed at the Cambridge Theatre, London, conducted by Lambert. The cast comprised:

Role	Dancer
Job	John MacNair
His Wife	Margery Stewart
His Three Daughters	Marie Nelson, Ursula Moreton, Doreen Adams
His Seven Sons	William Chappell, Hedley Briggs, Walter Gore, Claude Newman, Robert Stuart, Travers Kemp, Stanley Judson
The Three Messengers	Robert Stuart, Claude Newman, Travers Kemp
The Three Comforters	William Chappell, Walter Gore, Hedley Briggs
War, Pestilence and Famine	William Chappell, Walter Gore, Hedley Briggs
Elihu	Stanley Judson
Satan	Anton Dolin

Source: Michael Kennedy.

The production was repeated the next day and again on 24 July at Oxford as part of the ninth festival of the International Society for Contemporary Music. It was well received. The critic A. K. Holland, reporting "a tumultuous reception", called the work "a triumph for Vaughan Williams ... the most important recent contribution to English ballet". Another reviewer wrote:

"If the Camargo Society had nothing more to its credit than this ... it would have thoroughly justified its existence and, judging from the enthusiasm of the audience at the Cambridge Theatre, satisfied its subscribers ... had it been one of Diaghilev's productions when his Russian company was at its prime, it would have been hailed as one of his most outstanding achievements.

According to The Times, "here was that rare thing, a completely satisfying synthesis of the arts".

== Music ==
The full orchestral version is scored for three flutes (third doubling on piccolo and alto flute), two oboes, cor anglais, two clarinets (in B♭), alto saxophone, bass clarinet (doubling on third clarinet in B♭), two bassoons, contrabassoon, four horns (in F), three trumpets (in B♭), three trombones, tuba, timpani, triangle, side drum, cymbals, bass drum, xylophone, glockenspiel, tam tam, organ, two harps, and strings.

Lambert's instrumentation for theatre orchestra comprises: 2 flutes (second doubling piccolo), 1 oboe, 2 clarinets, E♭ saxophone (played by second clarinet), 2 horns, 2 trumpets, 1 trombone, timpani, percussion (3 players: cymbals, bass drum, xylophone, glockenspiel, tam-tam), 1 harp, strings.

Vaughan Williams dedicated the score to the conductor Adrian Boult in 1934, after learning that at Boult's instigation the Bach Choir had raised funds towards the engraving of the full orchestra score of Job. Boult made four commercial recordings of the work – with the BBC Symphony Orchestra (issued 1946), the London Philharmonic Orchestra (1954 and 1966), and the London Symphony Orchestra (1971). The Royal Liverpool Philharmonic Orchestra, conducted by Andrew Manze, recorded the work in 2023 and the album won the Gramophone Orchestra Album of the Year award in 2024.

== Performance history ==
The ballet was given on 22 September 1931 at the Old Vic. An adapted version was performed in New York at the Lewisohn Stadium in 1931, staged by Ted Shawn, who danced the role of Satan. The Camargo Society revived the original ballet in mid-1932 and took it to Copenhagen in September of that year. From 1932 onwards it remained in the Vic-Wells (later Sadler's Wells) Ballet repertoire and was first presented on the large stage of the Royal Opera House, Covent Garden, in May 1948. Boult conducted, and the full orchestral score, rather than Lambert's reduction, was played. Raverat's original sets were considered unsuitable for the large Covent Garden stage, and new designs were commissioned from John Piper. Robert Helpmann played Satan and the cast included Donald Britton, John Cranko, Leslie Edwards, Julia Farron, John Field, Alexander Grant, Rowena Jackson, Gillian Lynne, Nadia Nerina and Michael Somes. The production was seen at intervals throughout the 1950s, and staged by the Birmingham Royal Ballet in the 1990s, including a performance in Coventry Cathedral in 1993. Subsequently, a performance was given by the Royal College of Music Junior Department’s Symphony Orchestra on 30 November 2024 in the Amaryllis Fleming Concert Hall, conducted by Jacques Cohen.

== Sections ==
The ballet comprises nine scenes, loosely based upon the sequence of Blake's illustrations and each including in the synopsis a quotation from the Bible. Vaughan Williams headed his score with 18 section headings.

- Scene I: "Saraband of the Sons of God" ("Hast thou considered my servant Job?")
  - Introduction
  - Pastoral Dance
  - Satan's Appeal to God
  - Saraband of the Sons of God
- Scene II: "Satan's Dance of Triumph" ("So Satan went forth from the presence of the Lord.")
  - Satan's Dance
- Scene III: "Minuet of the Sons of Job and Their Wives" ("There came a great wind and smote the four corners of the house and it fell upon the young men and they are dead.")
  - Minuet of the Sons and Daughters of Job
- Scene IV: "Job's Dream" ("In thoughts from the visions of the night ... fear came upon me and trembling.")
  - Job's Dream
  - Dance of Plague, Pestilence, Famine and Battle
- Scene V: "Dance of the Three Messengers" ("There came a messenger.")
  - Dance of the Messengers
- Scene VI: "Dance of Job's Comforters" ("Behold happy is the man whom God correcteth.")
  - Dance of Job's Comforters
  - Job's Curse
  - A Vision of Satan
- Scene VII: "Elihu's Dance of Youth and Beauty" ("Ye are old and I am very young.")
  - Elihu's Dance of Youth and Beauty
  - Pavane of the Heavenly Host
- Scene VIII: "Pavane of the Sons of the Morning" ("All the Sons of God shouted for joy.")
  - Galliard of the Sons of the Morning
  - Altar Dance and Heavenly Pavane
- Scene IX: "Epilogue" ("So the Lord blessed the latter end of Job more than his beginning.")

== Sources ==
- Howes, Frank (1937). The Dramatic Works of Ralph Vaughan Williams. Oxford: Oxford University Press. OCLC 13495322.
- Kennedy, Michael (1980) [1964]. The Works of Ralph Vaughan Williams (second ed.). London: Oxford University Press. ISBN 978-0-19-315410-0.
- Kennedy, Michael (1996). A Catalogue of the Works of Ralph Vaughan Williams. Oxford and New York: Oxford University Press. ISBN 978-0-19-816584-2.
- Keynes, Geoffrey (1971). Blake Studies: Essays on his life and work (second ed.). Oxford: Clarendon Press. ISBN 978-0-19-812003-2.
- Simeone, Nigel; Simon Mundy (1980). Sir Adrian Boult: Companion of Honour. London: Midas Books. ISBN 978-0-85-936212-2.
