= John Elvin Rusby =

British Army officer and physician (1891–1964)

- John Elvin Rusby
- Born: 3 August 1891; Beeston, Yorkshire, England
- Died: 9 June 1964 (aged 72) Leeds, Yorkshire, England
- Allegiance: United Kingdom
- Branch: British Army
- Service years: 1915-c. 1960
- Rank: Colonel
- Conflicts: World War I World War II
- Awards: OBE; Queen Elizabeth II Coronation Award; Croix de Guerre; Military Cross
- Spouse: Marjorie Taylor (m. 1921)
- Children: 3
- Other work: Physician

Colonel John Elvin Rusby, OBE, JP, MC, TD, (3 August 1891 - 9 June 1964) was a British Army officer and physician, notably serving as Captain of the Royal Army Medical Corps during the First World War. He also served in the Second World War, accompanying several field ambulances in combat. For his services in both wars, he received several medals and awards, most notably being made an OBE as part of the 1959 New Years Honours.

== Early life ==
John Elvin Rusby was born on 3 August 1891, in the Beeston area of Leeds, the youngest of three children to John and Lydia Rusby (née Appleyard). His father worked as a collier for many years, eventually taking charge of a mine in Beeston. His grandfather was also a collier in Ambler Thorn and had advocated for higher wages for miners. John was baptised Non-conformist at 3 years old.

He came from a staunch working-class background, mostly in the coal mining industry; although his uncle had done well in the picture framing business and was involved in a project to turn Ravenscar into a holiday resort to rival Scarborough, but this was met with failure.

== Career ==
Rusby did well in school, and it was generally agreed that he should go into the medical profession. He qualified at Leeds in 1915, and was soon serving with the Royal Army Medical Corps in France - during his service he was awarded the Military Cross at Ypres, and a bar at Givenchy. He was honoured for conspicuous gallantry on at least two occasions.

He spent the inter-war period as a medical practitioner in Leeds, while still continuing association and service with the Territorial Army. In 1938, he was appointed a representative of the Leeds Division of the British Medical Association. He served in the Second World War, spending most of the war accompanying field ambulances, which took him to "difficult and diverse conditions" in Iceland and West Africa. In 1948, for his services, he was awarded the Croix de Guerre and was made a Chevalier of the Legion of Honour.

After the war, he again continued his general practice and was also active in the early days of the National Health Service.

== Personal life ==
Rusby married in 1921 in Armley, to Marjorie Taylor, with whom he had three children. His cousin was Observer Captain William Rusby, who served with the Royal Observer Corps; he was also made an OBE in the 1957 New Years Honours. A great-uncle had served in the Napoleonic Wars and was awarded medals for his service at the Siege of Badajoz and the Siege of Ciudad Rodrigo.

He was a Freemason at Leodiensis Lodge No. 4029.
