= Clement Crisp =

British dance critic (1926–2022)

Clement Crisp OBE
- Born: 21 September 1926; Chadwell Heath, Essex, England
- Died: 1 March 2022 (aged 95)
- Occupations: Dance critic, journalist
- Years active: 1956–2020
- Known for: Long-time dance critic for the Financial Times (1956–2020)

Clement Andrew Crisp, OBE (21 September 1926 – 1 March 2022) was a British dance critic. He served as dance critic for the Financial Times from 1956 to 2020.

== Life and career ==
Crisp was born in Chadwell Heath, Essex on 21 September 1926, although for many years he claimed that he was born in 1931. He first became interested in ballet after seeing a performance of Swan Lake as a child. After attending Oxted School, he spent a year in Bordeaux, France, before studying at Keble College, Oxford. For many years he taught French before becoming dance critic for the Financial Times in 1956. He also served as dance critic of The Spectator in the 1960s. His focus was on ballet, having discovered it as a teenager during the Second World War when his parents took him to the Sadler's Wells Ballet, though he also wrote about other forms of dance and had wide-ranging interests.

He was the author or co-author of 17 books on dance and dance history, including Ballet: An Illustrated History, co-written with Mary Clarke and published in 1973. In 2021 a collection of his reviews, entitled Six Decades of Dance, was published.

Crisp was also librarian and archivist of the Royal Academy of Dance for many years.

Crisp died on 1 March 2022, at the age of 95.

== Awards ==
Crisp was awarded the Queen Elizabeth II Coronation Award in 1992. In the same year he was made a Knight of the Order of the Dannebrog (Denmark). In 2003, Dance Research published a special Golden Jubilee edition of his work. In 2005, he was awarded the Order of the British Empire (OBE) in the Birthday Honours "for services to ballet".

== Books ==
Crisp's works included:

- Ballet: An Illustrated History (with M. Clarke, London, 1973, revised edition, 1992)
- Ballet for All (with P. Brinson, London, 1970, revised edition, 1980)
- Making a Ballet (with Clarke, London, 1974)
- Ballet in Art (with Clarke, 1976)
- Design for Ballet (with Clarke, London, 1978)
- Introducing Ballet (with Clarke, 1978)
- History of Dance (with Clarke, London, 1981)
- The Balletgoer's Guide (with Clarke, 1981)
- Dancer (with Clarke, 1984)
- Ballerina (with Clarke, 1987)
- Gerland Dowler (ed.): Clement Crisp Reviews: Six Decades of Dance, (International Dance Writing Foundation, 2021)
