= Joan Benesh =

British ballet dancer (1920–2014)

- photographed in Liverpool before her marriage by E. Chambré Hardman
- Born: Joan Dorothy Rothwell; 24 March 1920; Wavertree, Liverpool, England
- Died: 27 September 2014 (aged 94)
- Occupations: ballerina, choreographer
- Employer: Royal Ballet
- Known for: Benesh Movement Notation
- Spouse: Rudolf Benesh

Joan Benesh (née Rothwell; 24 March 1920 – 27 September 2014) was a British ballet dancer who, with her husband Rudolf, created the Benesh Movement Notation, which is the leading British system of dance notation.

== Early life, education, and marriage ==
She was born Joan Dorothy Rothwell in the Wavertree district of Liverpool in 1920. She studied dance for three years in Liverpool at the Studio School of Dance and Drama and then studied with Lydia Sokolova. She won the ballet prize of the All England Dance Competition in 1937 and the Parker Trophy for Dance in 1938.

She then worked as a dancer and choreographer in commercial theatre where, in 1947, she met the accountant, artist and musician, Rudolf Benesh, who noticed that she was having trouble: "During a break while I was painting Joan's portrait, I mused at her struggle to get down on paper her choreographic ideas for a ballet". He began a notation to help her record her dances and they developed the system together. The couple married on 12 March 1949 and she then joined the Sadler's Wells Ballet Company.

== Benesh Movement Notation ==
The notation uses a five bar stave to record the position of the limbs and body. Above the stave, additional signs record the facial expression and the position of the eyes and fingers. These details arose from Joan's special interest in Bharatanatyam – the classical dance of South India. Their notation system was presented to the Royal Ballet, fully published in 1956 and exhibited at Expo 58 in Brussels.

In 1960, the Royal Ballet recruited a notator who had been trained in the Benesh system. The Benesh Institute of Choreology was then created in 1962 with Joan as principal, Rudolf as director and Frederick Ashton as president. The Institute established a library of dance scores in London and a residential training college in Sussex.

== Later life ==
Rudolf died of cancer in 1975 and Joan then retired as principal. She published a history, Reading Dance: The Birth of Choreology, in 1977 and was recognised with the Queen Elizabeth II Coronation Award of the Royal Academy of Dance in 1986. She retired to Wimbledon where her hobbies included gardening, sewing and philosophy. She subsequently moved to Skelmersdale to be near her only son Anthony. She died in a nursing home there of pneumonia in 2014, aged 94.
