= Julia Farron =

English ballerina (1922–2019)

Julia Farron OBE
- Born: Joyce Margaret Farron-Smith; 22 July 1922; London, England
- Died: 3 July 2019 (aged 96)

Julia Farron OBE (born Joyce-Margaret Farron-Smith; 22 July 1922 – 3 July 2019) was an English ballerina, best known as one of the earliest and all-time youngest members of The Royal Ballet, the leading ballet company based at the Royal Opera House in Covent Garden, London.

Julia Farron was born Joyce Margaret Farron-Smith in London on 22 July 1922. In 1931, Farron became the first pupil to receive a scholarship to study under the direction of Dame Ninette de Valois at the Vic-Wells Ballet School. She made her professional stage debut in a pantomime in 1934, aged twelve. In 1936, having completed five years of study at the ballet school, she joined the Vic-Wells Ballet, becoming the company's youngest member, aged fourteen.

The following year, in 1937, she danced her first created role, Pepe the Dog, in the ballet A Wedding Bouquet choreographed by Sir Frederick Ashton. Farron would stay with the company throughout its development into The Royal Ballet, eventually achieving the rank of principal dancer. Farron was part of the Sadler's Wells Ballet touring party who were on a propaganda tour in the Netherlands when the Germans invaded in May 1940. She and the company were initially stranded until they managed to get on the last British boat out of Holland to be evacuated as the Dutch surrendered. The true story of their escape is told in the book 'Escape From Holland' by Chris Hunt. In early 1947, Julia danced, alongside Harold Turner, the Neapolitan Tarantella in La Boutique Fantasque. A respected critic of the time, Audrey Williamson, noted "the bright attack and style that distinguish all her work". After retiring from the professional stage, she was appointed as a teacher at the Royal Ballet School in 1964. She was appointed assistant director of the Royal Academy of Dance in 1982, becoming Director in 1983 and eventually retired in 1989, with an honorary life fellowship of the organisation (FRAD). In 1994, the Royal Academy of Dance awarded her the Queen Elizabeth II Coronation Award for outstanding services to ballet. Most recently, she has sponsored the redevelopment of the White Lodge Museum and Ballet Resource Centre.

Farron was appointed Officer of the Order of the British Empire (OBE) in the 2012 New Year Honours for services to ballet.

She married the South African ballet dancer and choreographer Alfred Rodrigues in 1948, and they had a son, Christopher. She died on 3 July 2019 at the age of 96.

== Selected repertoire ==
=== Productions by John Cranko ===
- The Prince of the Pagodas
- Antigone

=== Productions by Frederick Ashton ===
- Ondine
- Daphnis and Chloë
- Nocturne

=== Productions by Nicholas Sergeyev ===
- The Sleeping Beauty
- Swan Lake

=== Productions by Kenneth MacMillan ===
- Romeo and Juliet
- Giselle
