= Rudolf Benesh =

British mathematician

Rudolf Benesh (16 January 1916 – 3 May 1975) was a British mathematician who created the Benesh Movement Notation for dancing.

== Biography ==
Rudolf Benesh was son of a Czech father and an Anglo-Italian mother. He worked as a mathematician while his wife Joan was a dancer in Sadler's Wells ballet in the late 1940s. She was having difficulty with her attempts to write and then decipher dance steps. He then devised a dance notation system while at work in the office. He wrote some lines to represent a movement of someone at a desk, then asked someone else to decipher them. The system evolved in the period 1947 to 1955. Dame Ninette de Valois announced that the Royal Opera House would be using the Benesh Movement Notation. In the following year, Rudolf and Joan wrote An Introduction to Benesh Dance Notation.

In 1957 the first dance notated with the system was Stravinsky's Petroushka. Faith Worth was the first professional Benesh notator. In 1962 the Benesh Institute of Choreology was established. In 1968 some dances of the Australian Aboriginal dancers of Northern Territory were notated by a group of anthropology students. Joan and Rudolf also wrote Reading Dance: The Birth of Choreology. The Royal Academy of Dance, in conjunction with the University of Surrey, produced software in the 1990s for inputting the notation and printing it out.
