= Jonathan Gray (editor) =

Jonathan Gray is the former editor of Dancing Times, the oldest dance magazine at the time it ceased publication.

Gray was a pupil at the Royal Ballet School from the age of eleven to 12. He received a degree in stage design from the Wimbledon School of Art.

Gray joined the Dancing Times in 2005, and has been the editor since 2008, when Mary Clarke retired, having been editor since 1963.

In August 2022 Dancing Times announced that it will cease publication following the September 2022 issue.
