= Homage to the Queen =

Ballet by Malcolm Arnold

Homage to the Queen, Op. 42, by Malcolm Arnold was written as the official coronation ballet in 1953, commissioned by the Sadler's Wells Ballet in honour of Queen Elizabeth II, the ballet company's musical adviser Humphrey Searle having recommended Arnold for the job.

== Original production ==
The original choreography was created by Frederick Ashton. It was first performed by the Sadler's Wells Ballet on Coronation night 2 June 1953 at the Royal Opera House Covent Garden, with original scenery and costumes by Oliver Messel. The Orchestra was conducted by Robert Irving.

There are six sections: 'Prelude and Opening Scene', 'Earth', 'Water', 'Fire', 'Air' and 'Finale'. The pas de deux for Margot Fonteyn and Michael Somes in 'Air' is a highlight of the ballet and was described by the critic Clive Barnes as “one of the finest pieces of classical choreography yet produced”.

Amongst the original performers were:

- Nadia Nerina as Queen of the Earth
- Violetta Elvin as Queen of the Waters
- Beryl Grey as Queen of Fire
- Margot Fonteyn as Queen of the Air
- John Hart

The ballet became part of the Sadler's Wells Ballet's regular repertoire during the mid-1950s. In the 1990s the Queen of the Air segment was revived.

== 2006 recreation ==
To celebrate the 80th birthday of Queen Elizabeth the ballet was revived in 2006. Apart from the Entree and the Queen of the Air, much of Ashton's original choreography was lost during the years, so new choreography was created for three of the sequences based on surviving material.

- Earth by David Bintley
- Water by Michael Corde
- Fire by Christopher Wheeldon

== Concert suites ==
The composer extracted a 17-minute concert suite, Op. 42a, from the ballet. There are also a version for wind band and a 9-minute solo piano version.

== Recordings ==
- Philharmonia Orchestra/Robert Irving (1953 complete recording). EMI Classics 7243 5 66120 2 0 (2006)]
- BBC Philharmonic Orchestra/Rumon Gamba (Suite). Chandos 10550 (2009)
- BBC Concert Orchestra/Martin Yates (complete recording). Dutton Epoch CDLX7420 (2025)
