= Lucia Cormani =

Italian ballet dancer

Lucia Cormani was a 19th and early 20th-century Italian ballet dancer and one of the founders of the Royal Academy of Dance.

== Biography ==
Lucia's life is not well documented, in part because she never danced in the most famous female roles. She was probably born about 1854 and died in Florence about 1942. Her name appears on posters of ballet performances in Berlin, Brussels, St Petersburg, Guatemala, Boston (1883) and New York City (1884). In 1889 she appeared as the Premiere Danseuse Assoluta in Cinderella; Or, Ladybird, Ladybird, Fly Away Home at Her Majesty's Theatre, London and in 1900 she danced the role of Canio in a Metropolitan Opera production of Pagliacci (Philadelphia).

Because of her tall muscular frame, Lucia was several times cast as a "travesty dancer" (a woman dressed as a man) -- for example as a male pirate chief in the ballet "Algeria" in 1887, and as a sorcerer in "Enchantment." Such roles were sometimes added for effect in ballets without being properly integrated into the plot.

Lucia's greatest success was as a choreographer from about 1893 to 1911. In 1903 she choreographed a production of Carmen for the Alhambra Theatre in London. She also taught, using the stage of the Alhambra since she had no studio of her own. In 1920, she collaborated with four other great dancers -- Adeline Genée, Tamara Karsavina, Edouard Espinosa, and Phyllis Bedells—to form the Association of Teachers of Operatic Dancing, which was later to become the Royal Academy of Dance. Between them, the five represented the principal dance training methods of the time - Genée the Danish school, Karsavina the Russian school, Cormani the Italian school, Espinosa the French school, and Bedells the English school. In 1923 the association began a series of Annual Matinées; ten of Cormani's students participated in the premier performance, dancing a tarantella.

Her collected letters are in the London Theatre Museum and there are dozens of photographs of Cormani in the National Portrait Gallery.
