= Jean Bedells =

British ballet dancer

Jean Bedells (1924–2014) was a British ballet dancer.

She was the daughter of Phyllis Bedells, and Major Ian Gordon McBean.

She later worked as an examiner for the Royal Academy of Dancing.
