= Ursula Moreton =

Ursula Moreton (13 March 1903 – 24 June 1973) was a British ballerina and teacher, director of the Royal Ballet School from 1952 to 1968.

== Early life ==
She was born in Southsea on 13 March 1903.

== Career ==
=== Dancer ===
Moreton studied with Cecchetti and debuted in 1920 in London in The Truth about the Russian Dancers, a play starring Tamara Karsavina. The next year, she was in Serge Diaghilev's staging of The Sleeping Princess and then danced with Léonide Massine's company. She danced roles in the ballets of Ninette de Valois, Frederick Ashton and Fokine.

=== Teacher ===
From 1926, she worked with Ninette de Valois as her assistant, then from 1931, ballet mistress for Vic-Wells Ballet. From 1946 to 1952, she was assistant director of Sadler's Wells Theatre Ballet, and from 1952 to 1968, director of the Royal Ballet School.

== Created roles ==
All with Ninette de Valois:

- Les Petits Riens (1928)
- Hommages aux Belle Viennoises (1929)
- Narcissus and Echo (1932)

== Later life ==
She was awarded the Queen Elizabeth II Coronation Award in 1961 for her services to ballet in Britain.

She was awarded the OBE in 1968 for her services to ballet.

She was elected a Fellow of the Royal Academy of Dancing 1972 in recognition of her contribution in the field of dance education.

She was married to Gerald Vickers Stevens, and had one son, David Michael Frederick.

She died in London on 24 June 1973.

== Legacy ==
The Ursula Moreton Choreographic Award was created in her honour in 1973.
