= Adeline Genée =

Danish-British ballet dancer (1878–1970)

Dame Adeline Genée DBE
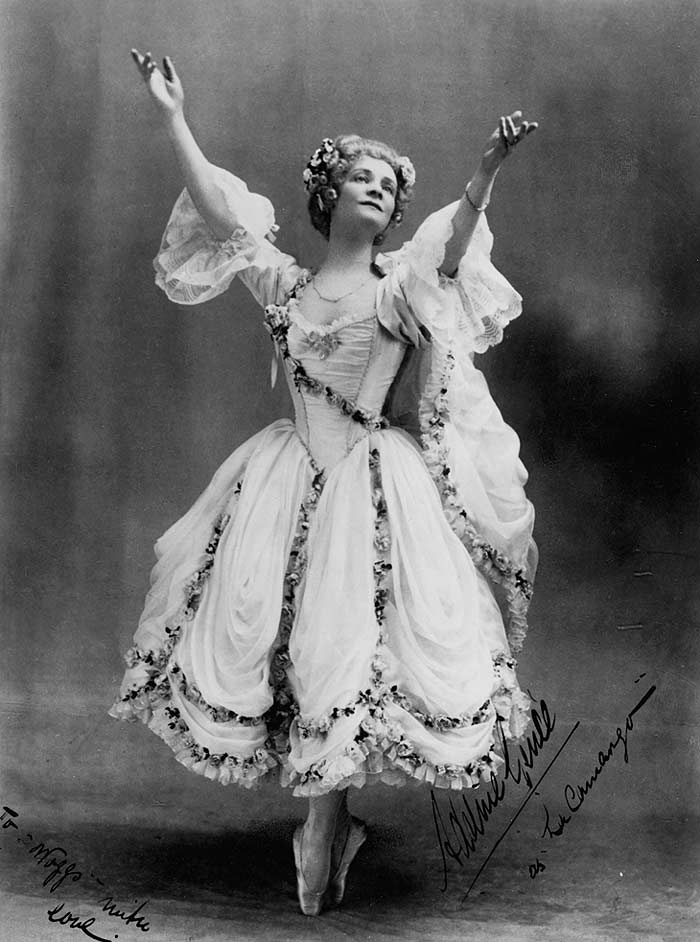
- Genée in La Camargo, 1912
- Born: Anina Margarete Kirstina Petra Jensen; 6 January 1878; Hinnerup, Jutland, Denmark
- Died: 23 April 1970 (aged 92); Esher, Surrey, United Kingdom
- Spouse: Frank Seymour Nilsson Isitt (m. 1910; died 1939)

Dame Adeline Genée DBE (married name Isitt; 6 January 1878 – 23 April 1970), born Anina Kirstina Margarete Petra Jensen^{α}, was a Danish-British ballet dancer.

== Early years ==
Anina Margarete Kirstina Petra Jensen was born on 6 January 1878 in the then village of Hinnerup, Denmark, to Kjersten Thorgesen and Peder Jensen, a farmer.^{β} Genée was a surviving twin, and had an older sister.

Her uncle, Alexandre Genée, gave her dancing lessons from the age of three. When she was eight, Alexandre and his wife, the former Antonia Zimmerman, adopted her. As well as changing her last name to Genée, she changed her first name to Adeline in honour of the Italian opera star Adelina Patti. Genée's debut was with her uncle's touring company at the age of ten in Oslo (at that time called Christiania). In 1895, she became the principal dancer of the Royal Danish Ballet in Copenhagen. Subsequently, in 1896, she danced with the Berlin Royal Opera Ballet and the Munich Opera Ballet.

== At the Empire ==
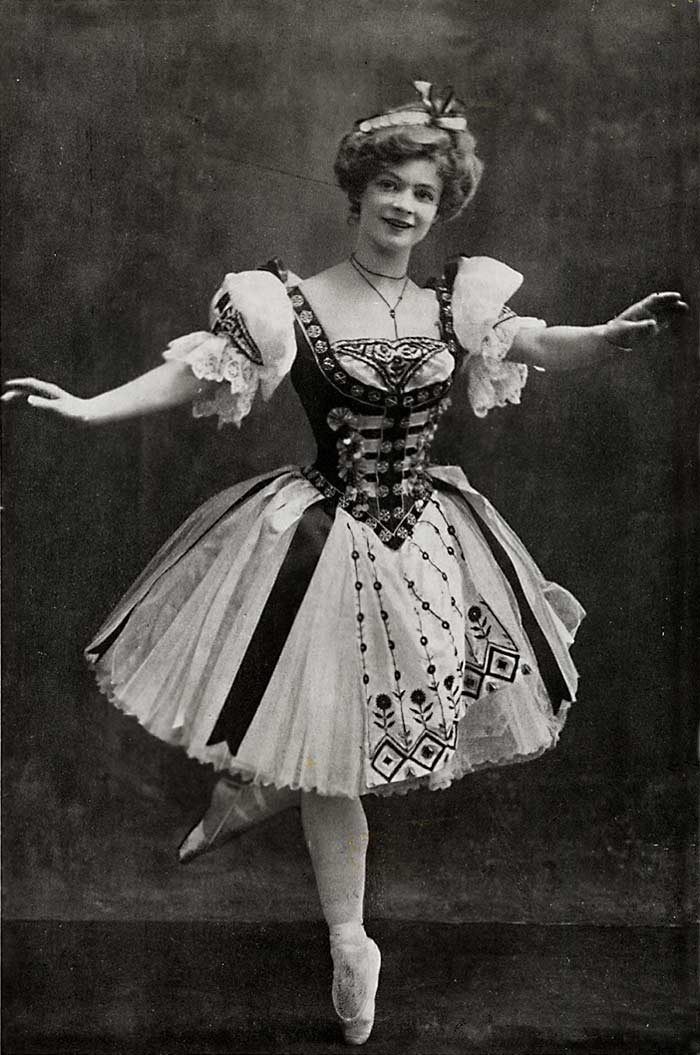
Genée as Swanilda in Coppélia

In 1897, she accepted a booking for six weeks to appear in Monte Cristo at the Empire Theatre of Varieties in London. She was so admired for her classical style in that ballet, that she was offered the position of prima ballerina at the Empire, and stayed there for ten years.

The Empire's ballets were mostly choreographed by Katti Lanner, but Genée supplied much of her own choreography, in conjunction with her uncle Alexandre. Her further successes there included The Press (1898), Les Papillons (1900), High Jinks (1904), Cinderella (1906), and the British premiere of Coppélia (1906).

The Edwardian period probably represents the lowest point in the history of English ballet. It consisted of short dances in variety programs. Genée did much to raise the status of ballet by reviving earlier productions and creating an audience for more elaborate works. She was versatile enough to dance light musical hall roles and in more severe classical roles. Slender and elegant, she was often described as like "Dresden china". In one respect she was very backward-looking, preferring a style of costume that belonged to the 1830s.

From April 1905, Genée danced in 400 performances of the musical play The Little Michus at Daly's Theatre.

== Around the world ==
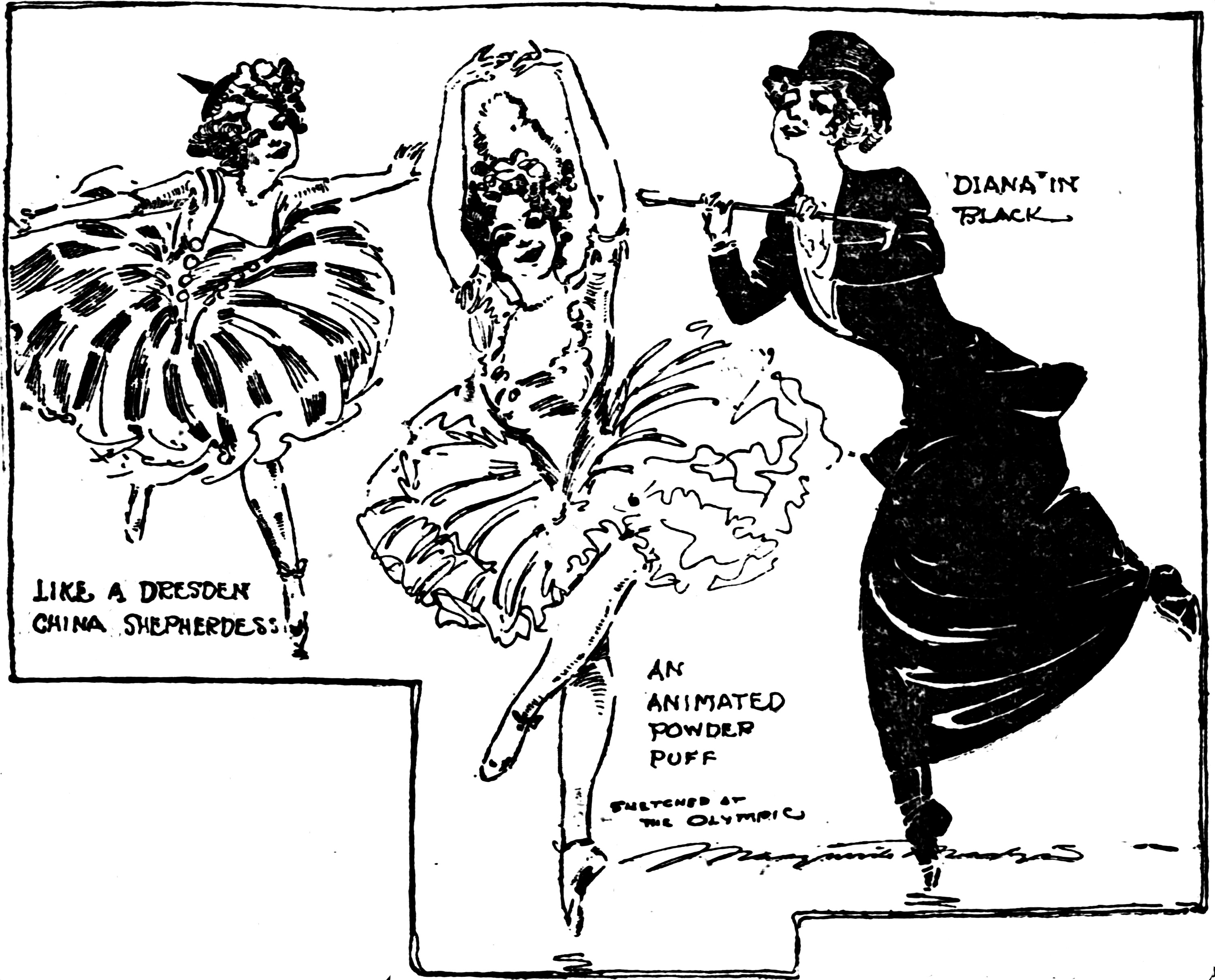
Sketches by journalist Marguerite Martyn at the Olympic theatre, St. Louis, Missouri, 1909

In November 1907, Genée sailed to the US to perform in The Soul Kiss at the New York Theatre. The producer, Florenz Ziegfeld, described her on the posters as "The World's Greatest Dancer." In the United States at that time, many people were entirely unfamiliar with ballet, so a ballet performance needed to be presented as part of a musical spectacular.

For several years, Genée alternated between a season in London and one in America, although after her marriage to Frank S. N. Isitt in 1910 she gradually reduced the frequency of her appearances. Sergei Diaghilev saw her dance and immediately offered her a contract, but she refused it.

When she returned to America in 1908 she toured with The Soul Kiss. In subsequent American tours, she danced in The Silver Star (1909), The Bachelor Belles (1910), and Roses and Butterflies (1911). In the latter she was partnered by Alexis Kosloff, who presented her with a silver trophy, inscribed "To the World's Greatest Dancer".

On 3 December 1912 she made her debut at New York's Metropolitan Opera, with a program of divertissements which included La Camargo, which had premiered earlier in 1912 at the London Coliseum. In it she recreated the dancing of the great ballerina Marie Camargo. On 17 December 1912, the Met saw the premiere of La danse, subtitled "An Authentic Record by Adeline Genée of Dancing and Dancers between the Years 1710 and 1845". Its seven tableaux portrayed past ballerinas from Françoise Prévost to Marie Taglioni. La Camargo and La danse were original ballets by Genée, created in collaboration with the composer Dora Bright and the designer C. Wilhelm. She took these on her subsequent tours of America, Australia and New Zealand, as well as The Dryad, an earlier collaboration with Bright which had been a success at the Empire in 1908.

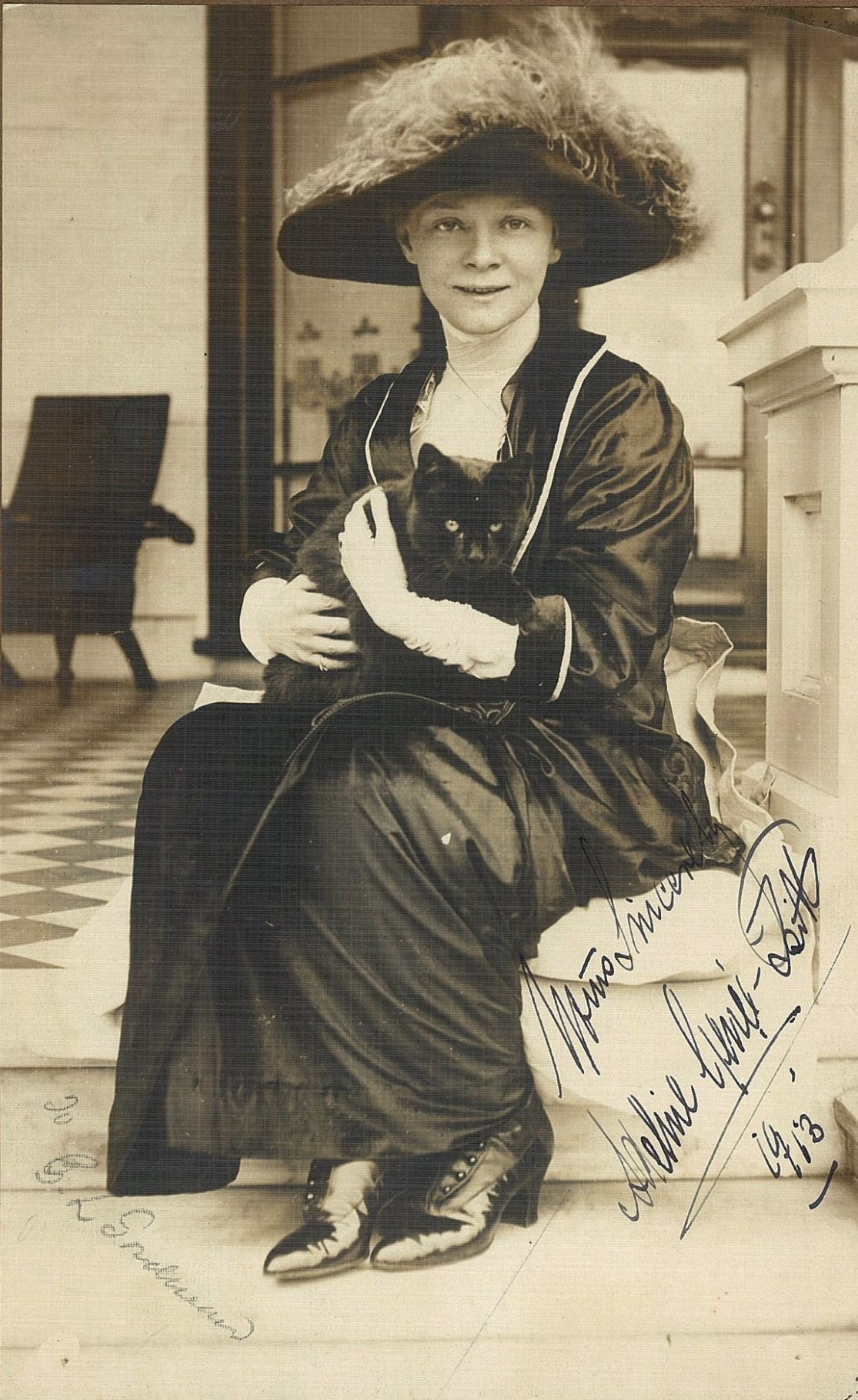
Genée, Sydney, 1913, by May and Mina Moore

On 21 June 1913, she returned to her greatest role, as Swanilda in Coppélia, this time in Melbourne. On 6 August 1913, Genée danced in Sydney.

In 1916, she went on a sixteen-week tour of Australia with J. C. Williamson's company. The Australian navy wildly cheered her dancing a hornpipe in a benefit show billed as "Navy Night". On returning to London, she gave her last major performance in April 1916 at the Coliseum in The Pretty Prentice. Thereafter, she appeared only in occasional charity performances and commemorations. In 1923, Genée was awarded the Ingenio et Arti medal by the King of Denmark.

Her last performance was on 15 March 1933, for the early television service of the BBC. Partnered by Anton Dolin, she danced in The Love Song. This was an original ballet, created for an earlier, special appearance at the London Coliseum, with period dance music composed by Bright. It was broadcast to London on the BBC National Programme, via the Baird process.

Genée became a Dame Commander of the Order of the British Empire in 1950. She gave her name to the Adeline Genee Theatre in East Grinstead (built in 1967, but now demolished) and the Genée studio in the Royal Academy of Dance, Battersea, London.

== Royal Academy of Dance ==
In 1920, Genée collaborated with Philip Richardson of the Dancing Time magazine, with the aim of improving the standard of dance and the teaching of dance in the United Kingdom. This led Richardson to organise a meeting of eminent dance professionals at the former Trocadero Restaurant in Piccadilly, with Genée as one of the special guests representing what were, at the time, recognised as the leading methods of classical ballet training.

- Phyllis Bedells – English Method
- Lucia Cormani – Italian Method
- Edouard Espinosa – French Method
- Adeline Genée – Bournonville Method, Denmark
- Tamara Karsavina – Imperial Method, Russia

This meeting ultimately led to the formation of the Association of Teachers of Operatic Dancing of Great Britain, which was officially founded in December 1920. The association grew in size and influence, with Queen Mary consenting to become its Patron. A royal charter was eventually granted by King George V in 1935, with the association becoming the Royal Academy of Dancing. Genee's friend Jennie Brenan used the methods in Australia and in 1936 she became the first overseas member of the Academy's grand council.

In 1953, Genée instituted the Queen Elizabeth II Coronation Award. She was president of the academy until her retirement in 1954, when she was succeeded by Dame Margot Fonteyn.

The association is known as the Royal Academy of Dance (RAD), with Darcey Bussell as president. It has grown to become one of the largest dance teaching and examination boards. The RAD now has over 14,000 members, and operates in 79 countries. As of 2025, there are over 1,000 students in full-time or part-time teacher training programmes with the academy and each year, the examination syllabus is taught to more than a quarter of a million students.

=== Genée International Ballet Competition ===
In 1931, the association established the Adeline Genée Gold Medal Awards, as a scholarship scheme for aspiring young dancers. Initially, medals were only awarded to female dancers, but awards for men were later introduced in 1939. Today, the Royal Academy of Dance continue to offer the awards; however, they have become known as the Genée International Ballet Competition. The Genée competition attracts candidates with recent finals being held in Australia, Canada, Greece, Hong Kong and Singapore. In May 2019, a week after the would-be 100th birthday of Dame Margot Fonteyn, the Genée International Ballet competition was renamed the Margot Fonteyn Ballet Competition, in honour of the RAD's longest-serving president.

== Personal life ==
On 11 Jun 1910, Genée married Frank Seymour Nilsson Isitt, a surveyor and Freemason, at All Saints Church, Westminster. Isitt died on 8 December 1939 in Rustington, West Sussex.

Genée died on April 23, 1970 in Escher, Surrey.

== Notes ==
^α Genée's birth name is often miscited as Anina Margarete Kirstina Petra Jensen.
^β The names of Genée's parents are sometimes anglicised as Kirsten and Peter.
