= Baltyboys House =

Country house in Ireland

Coordinates: 53°08′49″N 6°32′10″W

Baltyboys House, also known as Boystown House, is an 18th-century Georgian country house close to Blessington, County Wicklow, Ireland.

Baltyboys House is a mansion built in the Georgian style. The estate sits on one hundred acres. It is located a mile from Russborough House, near Poulaphouca Reservoir.

The estate was previously owned by the Smiths, a gentry family. Elizabeth Grant Smith, the wife of Colonel Henry Smith, wrote extensively about managing the estate, particularly during the Great Famine. Dame Ninette de Valois, the great-granddaughter of Elizabeth Grant Smith, was born at Baltyboys. In her 1959 memoir Come Dance With Me, de Valois described Baltyboys House thus:

My home, Baltiboys, a country house situated some two miles from the village of Blessington in County Wicklow, stood in the middle of a beautiful stretch of country at the foot of the Wicklow Hills. The original house was burnt in the rising of 1798; the house was now a long two-storeyed building with a spacious network of basement rooms. It was a typical Irish country house of about 1820-30, late Georgian in part, consisting of one main wing and two smaller ones.

In January 2014 the estate sold for €4.925 million by the owner, Elizabeth McClory, daughter of Vincent O'Brien and second wife of Kevin McClory. Baltyboys was not listed on the market, instead being sold through a private auction at Christie's.
