= Beryl Grey =

British ballet dancer (1927–2022)

Dame Beryl Grey CH DBE FRSA
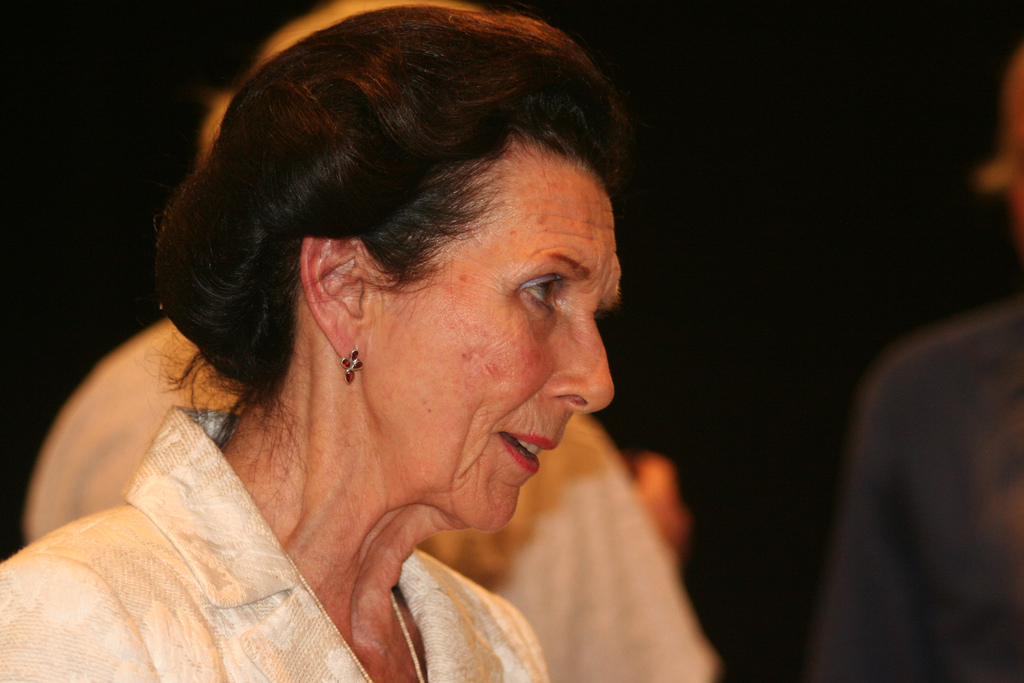
- Grey in 2006
- Born: Beryl Elizabeth Groom; 11 June 1927; Highgate, London, England
- Died: 10 December 2022 (aged 95); Pembury, Kent, England
- Occupations: Ballet dancer, ballerina
- Spouse: Dr. Sven Gustav Svenson (1950–2008)
- Children: 1

Dame Beryl Elizabeth Grey CH DBE FRSA (née Groom; 11 June 1927 – 10 December 2022) was a British ballet dancer.

== Early life ==
Beryl Elizabeth Groom was born in Highgate, London on 11 June 1927 to Annie and Arthur "Bob" Groom. She was an only child. She began dance classes at the age of four while attending Sherborne Preparatory School, and by age eight was being taught by Phyllis Bedells. By the age of nine, she had become the star pupil of her school, had been presented a silver medal by Tamara Karsavina and had passed all the examinations of the Royal Academy of Dancing it was possible for her to take. Her talent was recognised by Ursula Moreton and Ninette de Valois, who offered her a scholarship for four years at the age of ten, with the option of joining their dance company for a further four years, where de Valois changed her surname from Groom to Grey. She began to attend the Sadler's Wells School in 1937 where her teachers were Ninette de Valois and Vera Volkova.

== Career ==
In August 1941, she was taken into the company at the age of fourteen and joined them during a provincial tour, at Burnley. Her first appearance with the company was in the corps de ballet of Le Lac des Cygnes. She progressed through the company at a steady rate. Her first solo role was as one of the Blue Skaters in Frederick Ashton's Les Patineurs. Her first lead role was as the Serving Maid in The Gods Go A-Begging "with a charm and style remarkable for a child of fourteen and a half". On her fifteenth birthday, Dame Ninette de Valois gave her an inscribed copy of Gordon Anthony's book on Dame Margot Fonteyn and the opportunity of dancing Odette-Odile in the full-length Le Lac des Cygnes.

In 1942, Robert Helpmann created the first role for her in his second ballet The Birds where she was The Nightingale. In April 1943, she created her first dramatic role as Duessa in Ashton's ballet, The Quest, which was based on Edmund Spenser's The Faerie Queene. On 1 March 1944, she first portrayed the main role of Giselle in Derby. She then performed the role in London for the first time on her seventeenth birthday. Grey is also known for her interpretation of Myrtha, Queen of the Wilis, which she first performed in 1946. She first performed the role of Princess Aurora in The Sleeping Beauty on 20 June 1946 at the Royal Opera House, Covent Garden.

She was invited to screentest for the part of the French Princess in Laurence Olivier's 1944 film Henry V, who had been introduced to Grey by Helpmann. However, when de Valois heard, she put an end to it.

From 1957 until the mid-1960s, Grey was an international guest ballerina across Europe, South America, Australasia, the Far East, the United States and Canada. In 1957, she became the first English dancer to appear as a guest ballerina with the Kirov and Bolshoi Ballet. Grey was the first Western guest artist to dance with the Bolshoi Ballet (1957–1958), and to appear with the Peking Ballet and Shanghai Company (with a Chinese partner) in 1964. She was the subject of This Is Your Life in April 1974 when she was surprised by Eamonn Andrews at the London Festival Ballet's Donmar rehearsal studios in London's Covent Garden.

== Personal life and death ==
Grey was married to Sven Svenson until his death in 2008. The couple had one son together, Ingvar.

Grey died from colon cancer at Tunbridge Wells Hospital in Pembury, Kent, on 10 December 2022, at the age of 95.

== Awards, titles and positions ==
Grey held numerous honorary doctorates and had been Vice President of the Royal Academy of Dancing since 1980, was President of the Imperial Society of Teachers of Dancing and a Director of the Birmingham Royal Ballet. In September 1997 she was presented with the Queen Elizabeth II Coronation Award by Dame Antoinette Sibley. The Award is given by the Royal Academy of Dancing to individuals in recognition of great contribution to the world of ballet. She was appointed Member of the Order of the Companions of Honour (CH) in the 2017 Birthday Honours for services to dance.

- Honorary Life President, Imperial Society of Teachers of Dancing
- Commander of the Order of the British Empire, CBE (1973)
- Dame Commander of the Order of the British Empire, DBE (1988)
- Queen Elizabeth II Coronation Award (1997), presented by the Royal Academy of Dance
- Carl Alan Award (2010)
