= Elizabeth Grant (diarist) =

Scottish diarist

Elizabeth Grant Smith
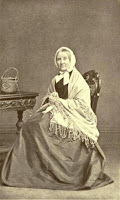
- Born: Elizabeth Grant of Rothiemurchus; 7 May 1797; Edinburgh; Scotland
- Died: 16 November 1885 (aged 88); Baltyboys House; Blessington, County Wicklow; Ireland
- Occupation: Diarist
- Spouse: Henry Smith
- Children: 3
- Parent: John Peter Grant (father)

Elizabeth Smith (née Elizabeth Grant of Rothiemurchus; 7 May 1797 – 16 November 1885) was a Scottish diarist and lady of the manor of Baltyboys House. Over the course of her life, she lived in Scotland, England, India, Ireland, and France.

== Life ==
Grant was born in Edinburgh in 1797. Her father, John Peter Grant, was a Member of Parliament. Her brother, Sir John Peter Grant, was the father of Jane Maria Strachey. As a child, she primarily spent time on her family's estate, Rothiemurchus, in Strathspey, and in London. In 1827 she and her family moved to Bombay in India, where John Peter Grant had secured a post as a judge after bankrupting the Rothiemurchus estate. Elizabeth married Colonel Henry Smith in 1829. They had three children; Janey, Annie, and Jack.

She is known today for the journals that she wrote from the 1840s when she was living in France. However she published in magazines anonymously during her life to supplement her family's income.

In her later years Grant moved to Baltyboys House, her husband's family's estate in Blessington, County Wicklow, Ireland. She wrote about managing the estate, establishing a school for local families, and the struggles of local peasants during the Great Famine.

Grant died at Baltyboys House. Memoirs of a Highland Lady was originally written as a private memoir for her family. The first public edition was only made available after her death. She is the great-grandmother of ballet dancer Dame Ninette de Valois.

== Work ==
The first edition of Memoirs of A Highland Lady was published with the consent of Grant's daughter in 1898. It was edited and abridged by Grant's niece, Jane Maria Strachey. The first edition was printed four times in the space of one year, with succeeding editions following in 1911 (reprinted in 1928) and 1950. However, the first complete and authentic edition was not published until 1988.
