= Phillip J. S. Richardson =

British writer on dancing (1873-1963)

Phillip J. S. Richardson (full name: Phillip John Sampey Richardson; 1875–1963) was a British writer on dancing.

He was born in Winthorpe, Nottinghamshire, UK, on 17 March 1875, and died in London, on 17 February 1963. He was the editor of Dancing Times from 1910 until 1957, founded The Association of Teachers of Operatic Dancing of Great Britain (later the Royal Academy of Dance), in 1920, and the International Council of Ballroom Dancing (later World Dance Council) in 1950.

He received an OBE in 1951, and the Queen Elizabeth II Coronation Award in 1963. He was also a collector of rare dance books which he bequeathed to the Royal Academy of Dancing. After they had been in the library of the academy for 35 years the collection was sold. Parts of it but not all had been microfilmed.

== Books ==
- Richardson, P. J. S., and Eustace A. Reynolds-Ball. The Americans' Mecca: Paris and the Beautiful Land of France. London: Middleton, 1910.
- Tynegate-Smith, Eve, and P. J. S. Richardson. The Textbook of Modern Ballroom Dancing. London: Dancing Times, 1933. OCLC 9368704
- Richardson, Phillip John Sampey. A History of English Ballroom Dancing (1910-45); The Story of the Development of the Modern English Style. London: Herbert Jenkins Ltd, 1946. OCLC 5636195
- Richardson, Philip John Sampey, and Ifan Kyrle Fletcher. Bibliographical Descriptions of Forty Rare Books Relating to the Art of Dancing. London: Dancing Times, ltd, 1954.
- Richardson, P. J. S. The Social Dances of the Nineteenth Century in England. London: H. Jenkins, 1960. OCLC 1109868
