= Dancing Times =

British dance magazine, est. 1894

- March 2012 cover
- Editors: Jonathan Gray
- Categories: Dance
- Frequency: Monthly
- First issue: 1894
- Final issue: 2022
- Company: The Dancing Times Limited
- Country: United Kingdom
- Language: English
- Website: https://web.archive.org/web/20230619055419/http://www.dancing-times.co.uk
- ISSN: 0011-605X
- OCLC: 2623442

Dancing Times was a dancing magazine based in the UK. At the time of its closure, it was the oldest dance magazine to be still published. The magazine helped found the Royal Academy of Dance, the Camargo Society, and the British Dance Council. Dance Today, a ballroom magazine, is a spin-off of Dancing Times.

== History ==
Dancing Times, first published in 1894 as the house magazine of the Cavendish Rooms, London, a ballroom dancing establishment, is the oldest monthly devoted to dancing. It was bought in 1910 by Phillip J. S. Richardson and T. M. Middleton and transformed into a national periodical, covering all forms of dancing, and reporting worldwide.

Largely through the initiative of Richardson, and his contacts throughout the dance teaching and performing profession, it played an instrumental part in the founding of the Royal Academy of Dancing (now Dance), the Camargo Society for the encouragement and presentation of British ballet, (1930–33), and the British Board of Ballroom Dancing (now the British Dance Council), which codified the technique and controls the standards of the “English Style” of ballroom dancing.

Richardson continued as editor until 1958 when he was succeeded by A. H. Franks, journalist and author of books on ballet and social dancing, but remained president until his death in 1963. Franks split off the ballroom section of the magazine into a second periodical, Ballroom Dancing Times, and in 1962 doubled the format of Dancing Times to its present size of A4. Franks died suddenly in 1963 and Mary Clarke, then assistant editor, became editor. In 2001 the ballroom magazine was redesigned and relaunched as Dance Today, still in the smaller format but devoted to a far wider range of social dance. The magazine is now edited by Nicola Rayner.

Dancing Times was edited by Jonathan Gray, from Clarke's retirement from the editorship in 2008 until its closure.

In August 2022, the magazine announced that it would cease publication following the September 2022 issue.
