= Alicia Markova =

British ballerina (1910–2004)

Dame Alicia Markova DBE
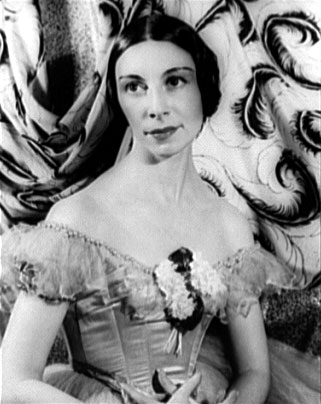
- Markova in 1940
- Born: Lilian Alicia Marks; 1 December 1910; Finsbury Park, London, England
- Died: 2 December 2004 (aged 94); Bath, Somerset, England
- Occupation: Ballerina
- Title: Prima ballerina assoluta

Dame Alicia Markova DBE (1 December 1910 – 2 December 2004) was a British ballerina and a choreographer, director and teacher of classical ballet. Most noted for her career with Sergei Diaghilev's Ballets Russes and touring internationally, she was widely considered to be one of the greatest classical ballet dancers of the twentieth century. She was the first British dancer to become the principal dancer of a ballet company and, with Dame Margot Fonteyn, is one of only two English dancers to be recognised as a prima ballerina assoluta. Markova was a founder dancer of the Rambert Dance Company, The Royal Ballet and American Ballet Theatre, and was co-founder and director of the English National Ballet.

== Early life and education ==
Markova was born in London as Lilian Alicia Marks on 1 December 1910. Her father, Arthur, was Jewish by birth; her mother, Eileen (née Barry), converted to Judaism. She was the eldest of four daughters. The family lived in a two bedroom flat in Finsbury Park at the time of her birth, but settled at 7 Cascade Avenue in Muswell Hill in 1914.

Marks began to dance as a young child on medical advice to strengthen her weak limbs. Her father built a stage in the family's backgarden and she and her sisters performed in costumes they made. Age nine, Marks saw Anna Pavlova dance and persuaded her father to take her to meet the ballerina. She made her stage debut at age ten, performing the role of Salome in the pantomime Dick Whittington and His Cat, for which she was billed as Little Alicia, the child Pavlova.

In 1920, she began studying ballet with Serafina Astafieva (also known as "Princess" Serafina Astafieva), a Russian ballerina living in London. Astafieva was a retired dancer of the Ballets Russes, a renowned ballet company founded by the impresario Sergei Diaghilev. Astafieva established the Russian Dancing Academy at The Pheasantry, King's Road, Chelsea, and was responsible for teaching a number of notable British dancers including Margot Fonteyn and Anton Dolin. A blue plaque now marks the site of Astafieva's former studio.

== Career ==
=== Diaghilev's Ballets Russes ===
At the age of 13, Marks was observed in class by Diaghilev, who was visiting London in search of new talent for his ballet company. He invited her to join the Ballets Russes in Monte Carlo, which she did in 1925, one month after her 14th birthday. Diaghilev gave her the Russified stage name of ‘Alicia Markova’ which she retained for the rest of her life. Due to her age, she performed a number of roles which were specially choreographed for her, also performing in a varied repertoire of new and established ballets. Her début was as Little Red Riding Hood in spring 1925. Alongside the many notable dancers, during this period she encountered a number of leading 20th century figures who created work for the company including Pablo Picasso, Henri Matisse, Igor Stravinsky, Sergei Prokofiev, Léonide Massine, George Balanchine, and Bronislava Nijinska.

=== After Diaghilev ===
Following the death of Diaghilev in 1929, Markova returned to England, where she became the founder Principal Ballerina of The Ballet Club, a company founded by Dame Marie Rambert. During this period, she was particularly noted for performing works by Frederick Ashton, who was unknown at the time, but would go on to become one of Britain's most celebrated choreographers. The Ballet Club was to be the first professional ballet company in the United Kingdom, later becoming known as the Ballet Rambert. Now known as the Rambert Dance Company, it remains the oldest established dance company in the UK.

In 1931, Ninette de Valois founded the Vic-Wells Ballet in premises at Sadler's Wells theatre in London. A former colleague from Diaghilev's company, she invited Markova to join the company as one of its founder dancers, which she did, forming a famous partnership with Anton Dolin. De Valois hired Frederick Ashton, who became the resident choreographer and later Artistic Director of the company. In 1933, de Valois appointed Markova as the first Prima Ballerina of the company, which is now the internationally renowned Royal Ballet.

After seeing the Camargo Society's 1932 production of Giselle, starring Olga Spessivtseva and Dolin, Markova came to appreciate the ballet's artistic potential. The role later became one of her signature performances, which she continued to refine throughout her career. She made her debut in the role on New Year's Day 1934 at the Old Vic.

In 1935, Markova and Dolin left the Vic-Wells ballet to form their own touring company known as the Markova-Dolin Company. The company toured extensively for two seasons and in 1936 Prince Wolkonsky joined the company as ballet master. Later in 1938 Markova joined the Ballet Russe de Monte Carlo, touring the world as the company's star ballerina. The company was the first to tour ballet throughout the United States, taking the art form to audiences who had never seen ballet before. During this time, she was a key figure in the formation of the American Ballet Theatre, dancing with the company during its early years.

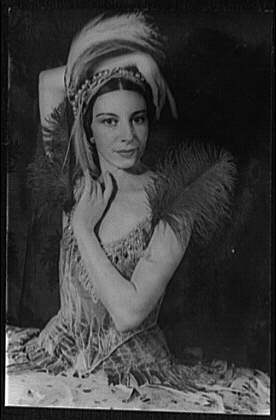
Portrait of Markova in the Bluebird Variation of The Sleeping Beauty, commissioned from Igor Stravinsky for the American Ballet Theatre (1941)

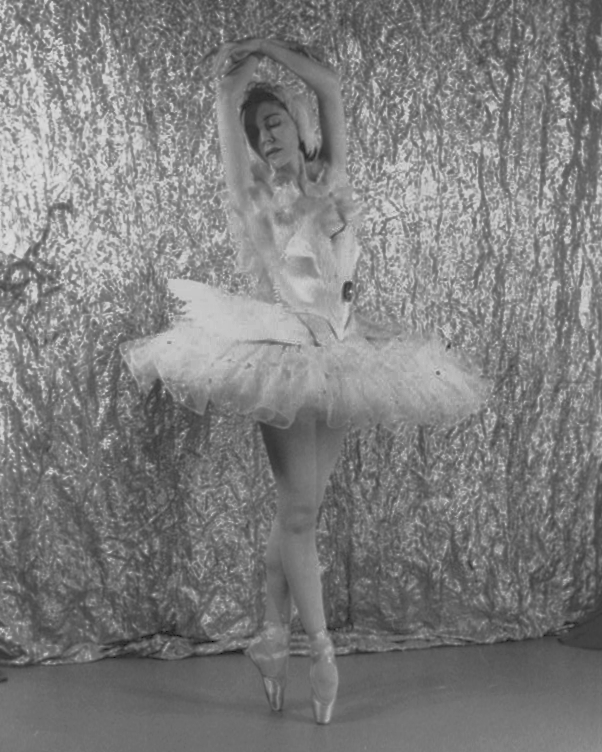
Markova in "The Dying Swan", 1948

Markova appeared in ballets around the world, but is remembered mostly for her Giselle, as well as for The Dying Swan and Les Sylphides. During the Second World War she re-formed Les Ballets Russes in the United States and appeared as a dancer with Dolin in the Hollywood film, A Song for Miss Julie.

=== English National Ballet ===
In 1950, Markova and Dolin became the co-founders of the Festival Ballet, a company formed to celebrate the imminent Festival of Britain and backed by the Polish businessman Julian Brunsweg. Dolin was to be the company's first Artistic Director, with Markova as Prima Ballerina. The company was formed to tour ballets to audiences that would otherwise be unable to experience ballet, and went on to tour extensively to less conventional venues both in the United Kingdom and internationally. It also established a number of educational programmes designed to make ballet accessible to new audiences. She remained the Prima ballerina until 1952, after which she continued to appear regularly as a guest dancer until her retirement from professional dancing.

In 1960, she collaborated with Indian classical dancer Ram Gopal to create a duet "Radha-Krishna" based on Hindu mythology, in which she danced as Radha, while he danced as Krishna. Today their collaboration is commemorated at the National Portrait Gallery, London where her bronze bust stands next to his portrait. In 1989, the Festival Ballet was renamed English National Ballet to reflect the company's role as Britain's only classical ballet company dedicated to touring ballets nationwide at an affordable price for audiences.

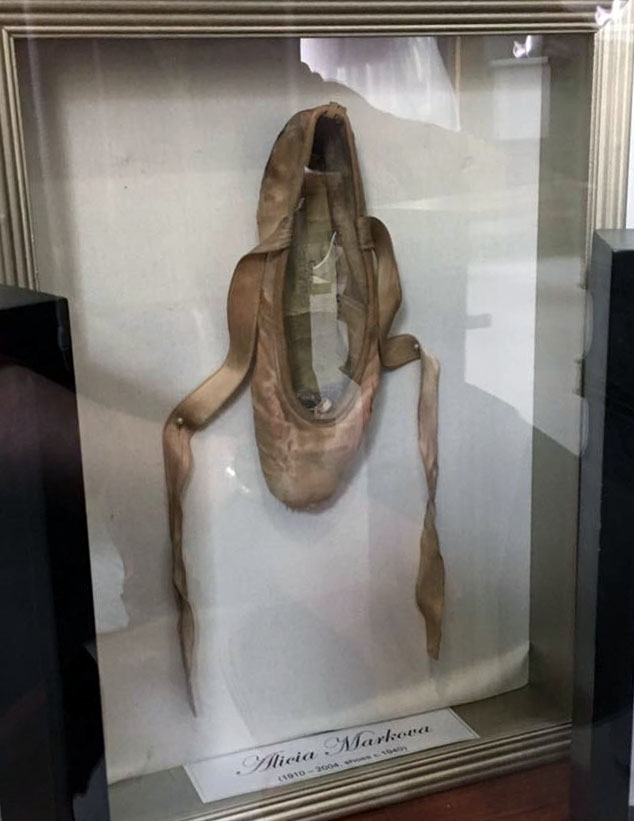
Pointe shoe belonging to Markova, currently housed at The Shoe Room in Toronto.

=== Retirement ===
Markova retired from professional dancing in January 1963 at the age of 52. Following her retirement, she continued to play an active role in the ballet and theatre industry as a teacher, director and choreographer. She was responsible for staging a number of ballets that she had performed with the Ballets Russes, also coaching dancers for roles she had created for choreographers such as Sir Frederick Ashton.

As a teacher she presented televised master classes and was also appointed Professor of Ballet and Performing Arts at the University of Cincinnati. In her later years, she continued to be a regular member of the teaching faculty for residential ballet courses such as the Yorkshire Ballet Seminars and the Abingdon Ballet Seminars, and was also President and a regular guest teacher at the Arts Educational Schools in London and Tring. She was also a governor and regular guest teacher at the Royal Ballet School.

She was the subject of This Is Your Life on two occasions, in January 1960 when she was surprised by Eamonn Andrews at the Royal Festival Hall, and in October 1995, when Michael Aspel surprised her at London's Royal Opera House. Markova was Patron/President of numerous dance organisations, including serving as President of English National Ballet, a Governor of The Royal Ballet and vice President of the Royal Academy of Dance.

=== Death ===
Some time after suffering a stroke, Markova died on 2 December 2004 in a hospital in Bath, one day after her 94th birthday. She never married. A funeral service was held at Bath's Haycombe Crematorium. A memorial service of thanksgiving for her life and work was held at Westminster Abbey on 8 March 2005.

As part of the service, dancers of the English National Ballet company performed extracts from the ballet Giselle (Daria Klimentová, Dmitri Gruzdyev, Erina Takahashi, Arionel Vargas) and Les Sylphides (Agnes Oakes and Simone Clarke).

== Awards and honours ==
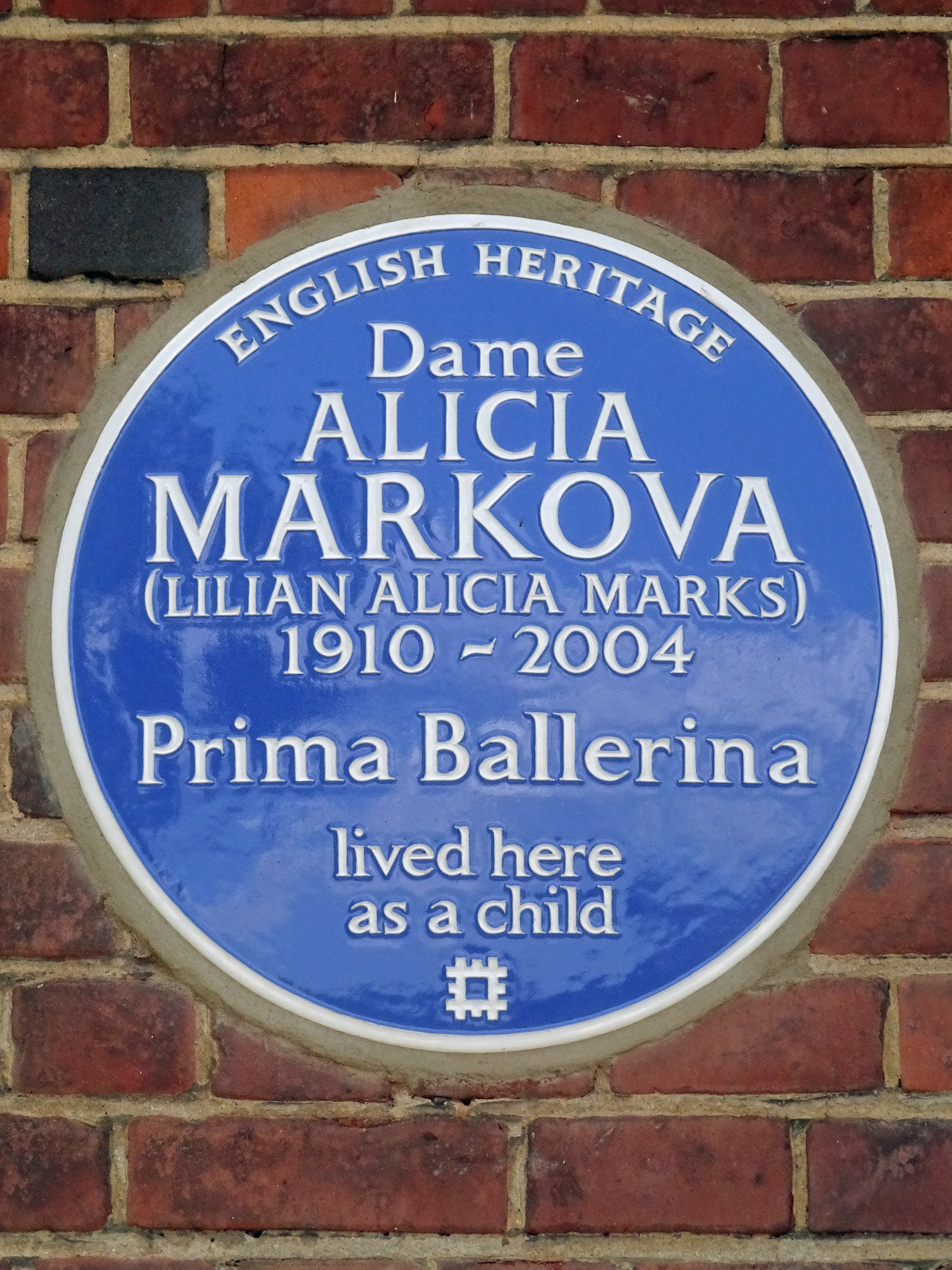
2025 English Heritage blue plaque Dame ALICIA MARKOVA (LILIAN ALICIA MARKS) 1910−2004 Prima Ballerina lived here as a child

- 1957 - Dance Magazine Award
- 1957 - Woman of the Year Award (American Women's Organisation)
- 1958 - CBE, Commander of the Order of the British Empire
- 1963 - DBE, Dame Commander of Order of the British Empire
- 1963 - Queen Elizabeth II Coronation Award, Royal Academy of Dance
- 1966 - DMus, Honorary Doctorate of Music, Leicester University
- 1982 - MusD, Honorary Doctorate of Music, University of East Anglia
- 1994 - Evening Standard Special Award
- 2000 - Cecchetti D'Argento Award, Imperial Society of Teachers of Dancing
- 2001 - DUniv, Honorary Doctor of the University, Middlesex University
- 2025 - English Heritage unveiled a blue plaque in her honour at her childhood home, 7 Cascade Avenue, Muswell Hill, North London, N10 3PT in June 2025.

== Positions ==
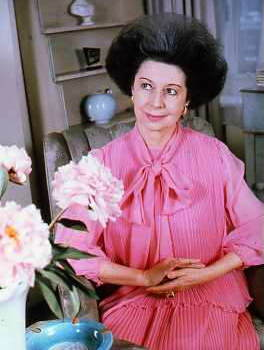
Dame Alicia Markova Allan Warren

- Co-Founder and President, English National Ballet
- Governor, The Royal Ballet
- Vice President, Royal Academy of Dance
- President, The London Ballet Circle
- Patron, The Academy of Indian Dance
- President, All England Dance Association
- President, The Arts Educational Schools
- President, British Ballet Organization
- Professor of Ballet and Performing Arts, College-Conservatory of Music, University of Cincinnati
- Patron, Friends of Northern Ballet Theatre
- Patron, Abingdon Ballet Seminars
- Honorary President, ANCEC (Associazione Nationale Coreutica Enrico Cecchetti)
- Patron, Critics' Circle National Dance Awards
- Director, Metropolitan Opera Ballet 1963–69

== See also ==
- List of British Jews
- Alicia Markova "The Dying Swan"
- Women in dance
