= Margot Fonteyn International Ballet Competition =

- Awarded for: Classical Ballet
- Country: Worldwide
- Presented by: Royal Academy of Dance
- First award: 1931
- Website: thefonteyn.org

The Margot Fonteyn International Ballet Competition is an annual international classical ballet competition organised by the Royal Academy of Dance of London, England. It was originally named the Genée International Ballet Competition for Dame Adeline Genée, and was first held in London in 1931. In 2019, it was renamed the Margot Fonteyn Ballet Competition.
