= Mary Clarke (dance critic) =

Mary Clarke (23 August 1923 – 20 March 2015) was The Guardian's dance critic for over 17 years, and editor for 45 years of Dancing Times magazine. She studied at Mary Datchelor School.

== Biography ==
Clarke was born in Camberwell, London on 23 August 1923 to Frederick Clarke and Ethel Kate. Prior to the start of World War II, she attended Mary Datchelor Girls' School. She worked as a typist with Reuters press agency and had her first article, published in December 1943. She later went on to work for New York's Dance Magazine and Ballet Today as a London reporter.

== Selected publications ==
- The Encyclopaedia of Dance and Ballet, 1977 (editor with David Vaughan)
- Dancer: Men in Dance, 1984.
- Ballerina, 1987.
