= Ninette de Valois =

Irish-born British dancer (1898–2001)

Dame Ninette de Valois OM CH DBE
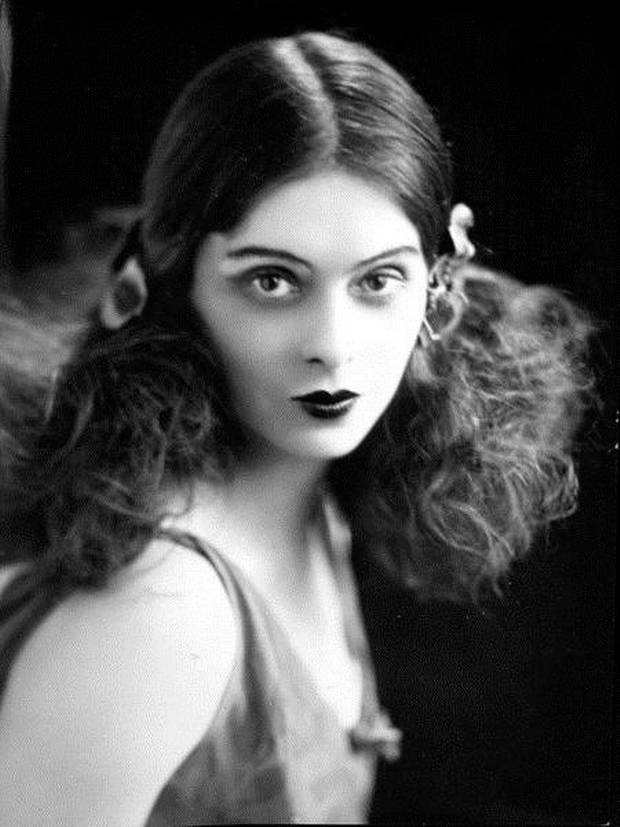
- de Valois, c. 1920s
- Born: Edris Stannus; 6 June 1898; Blessington, County Wicklow, Ireland
- Died: 8 March 2001 (aged 102); Barnes, London, England
- Citizenship: United Kingdom
- Education: Lila Field Academy for Children; Edouard Espinosa; Enrico Cecchetti; Nicholas Legat
- Occupations: Ballet dancer; Ballet teacher and coach; Choreographer; Company director
- Years active: 1900s–1990s
- Organizations: The Royal Ballet; Birmingham Royal Ballet; Royal Ballet School
- Known for: Ballet
- Notable work: Job (Choreographer); Checkmate (Choreographer)
- Title: Founder and Artistic Director
- Term: 1931–1963 (Royal Ballet)
- Predecessor: None (Founder)
- Successor: Sir Frederick Ashton
- Spouse: Arthur Blackall Connell (m. 1935; died 1987)
- Awards: Albert Medal (1964); Erasmus Prize (1974); Laurence Olivier Award (1992); Legion of Honour – Knight (1950)

Dame Ninette de Valois (born Edris Stannus; 6 June 1898 – 8 March 2001) was an Irish-born British ballet dancer, teacher, choreographer, and director of classical ballet. She danced professionally with Serge Diaghilev's Ballets Russes, later establishing The Royal Ballet, one of the foremost ballet companies of the 20th century and one of the leading ballet companies in the world. She also established the Royal Ballet School and the touring company which became the Birmingham Royal Ballet. She is widely regarded as one of the most influential figures in the history of ballet and as the "godmother" of English and Irish ballet.

== Life ==
=== Early life and family ===
De Valois was born Edris Stannus on 6 June 1898 at Baltyboys House, an 18th-century manor house near the town of Blessington, County Wicklow, Ireland, then still part of the United Kingdom. A member of the Stannus family, part of the landed gentry, she was the second daughter of Lieutenant Colonel Thomas Stannus DSO, a British Army officer, and Elizabeth Graydon Smith, a glassmaker known as "Lilith Stannus". She was the maternal great-granddaughter of the diarist Elizabeth Grant Smith and the maternal great-great-granddaughter of Scottish politician John Peter Grant. Through her mother she was also the great-grandniece of Sir John Peter Grant and a first cousin twice removed of Lady Strachey. In 1905 she moved to England, to live with her grandmother in Kent. She started attending ballet lessons in 1908, at the age of ten.

=== Early dancing career ===
At the age of thirteen Stannus began her professional training at the Lila Field Academy for Children. It was at this time that she changed her name to Ninette de Valois and made her professional debut as a principal dancer in pantomime at the Lyceum Theatre in the West End.

In 1919, at the age of 21, she was appointed principal dancer of the Beecham Opera, which was then the resident opera company at the Royal Opera House. She continued to study ballet with notable teachers, including Edouard Espinosa, Enrico Cecchetti and Nicholas Legat.

=== Ballets Russes ===
In 1923, de Valois joined the Ballets Russes, a renowned ballet company founded by the Russian impresario Sergei Diaghilev. She remained with the company for three years, performing around Europe and being promoted to the rank of Soloist, and creating roles in some of the company's most famous ballets, including Les biches and Le Train Bleu. During this time, she was also mentor to Alicia Markova who was only a child at the time, but would eventually be recognized as a Prima Ballerina Assoluta and one of the most famous English dancers of all time. Later in her life, Valois said that everything she knew about how to run a ballet company she learned from working with Diaghilev. She stepped back from regular intense dancing in 1924, after doctors detected damage from a previously undiagnosed case of childhood polio.

=== London and Dublin dance schools ===
After leaving the Ballets Russes, in 1927, de Valois established the Academy of Choreographic Art, a dance school for girls in London and the Abbey Theatre School of Ballet, Dublin. In London, her ultimate goal was to form a repertory ballet company, with dancers drawn from the school and trained in a uniquely British style of ballet. Students of the school were given professional stage experience performing in opera and plays staged at The Old Vic, with de Valois choreographing several short ballets for the theatre. Lilian Baylis was the owner of the Old Vic at that time, and in 1928 she also acquired and refurbished the Sadler's Wells Theatre, with the intention of creating a sister theatre to the Old Vic. She employed de Valois to stage full-scale dance productions at both theatres and when the Sadler's Wells theatre re-opened in 1931, de Valois moved her school into studios there, under the new name, the Sadler's Wells Ballet School. A ballet company was also formed, known as the Vic-Wells Ballet. The Vic-Wells ballet company and school would be the predecessors of today's Royal Ballet, Birmingham Royal Ballet and Royal Ballet School.

Also in 1927, in May, W. B. Yeats, poet and co-founder of the Abbey Theatre, suggested to de Valois while she was visiting Dublin the establishment of a ballet school in the city, and from around November, she took responsibility for the setting up and the programming of the Abbey Theatre School of Ballet in Dublin. This, the first of perhaps five Irish national ballet school projects during the 20th century, ran until June 1933, and 7 of the 16 final students continued in active dancing, with 2 founding the next national ballet project, the "Abbey School of Ballet".

=== Choreography ===
During these years de Valois produced a number of ballets each year, mostly to her own choreography. She also worked with music specially commissioned from Irish contemporary composers such as Harold R. White's The Faun (April 1928), Arthur Duff's The Drinking Horn and John F. Larchet's Bluebeard (both in July 1933).

=== Vic-Wells Ballet ===
At its formation, the Vic-Wells Ballet had only six female dancers, with de Valois working as lead dancer and choreographer. The company performed its first full ballet production on 5 May 1931 at the Old Vic, with Anton Dolin as guest star. Its first performance at Sadler's Wells Theatre came a few days later, on 15 May 1931. As a result of the success of the company, de Valois hired new dancers and choreographers. She retired fully from the stage herself in 1933, after Alicia Markova joined the company and was appointed as Prima Ballerina.

Under de Valois's direction, the company flourished in the 1930s, becoming one of the first Western dance companies to perform the classical ballet repertoire made famous by the Imperial Russian Ballet. She also set about establishing a British repertory, engaging Frederick Ashton as Principal Choreographer and Constant Lambert as musical director in 1935. She also choreographed a number of her own ballets, including her most notable works, Job (1931), The Rake's Progress (1935) and Checkmate (1937).

Eventually, the company included many of the most famous ballet dancers in the world, including Margot Fonteyn, Robert Helpmann, Moira Shearer, Beryl Grey, and Michael Somes. In 1949 the Sadler Wells Ballet was a sensation when they toured the United States. Fonteyn instantly became an international celebrity.

In 1947, de Valois established the first ballet school in Turkey. Formed as the ballet school of the Turkish State Opera and Ballet in Istanbul, the school was later absorbed into and became the School of Music & Ballet at Ankara State Conservatory, a department of the Hacettepe University.

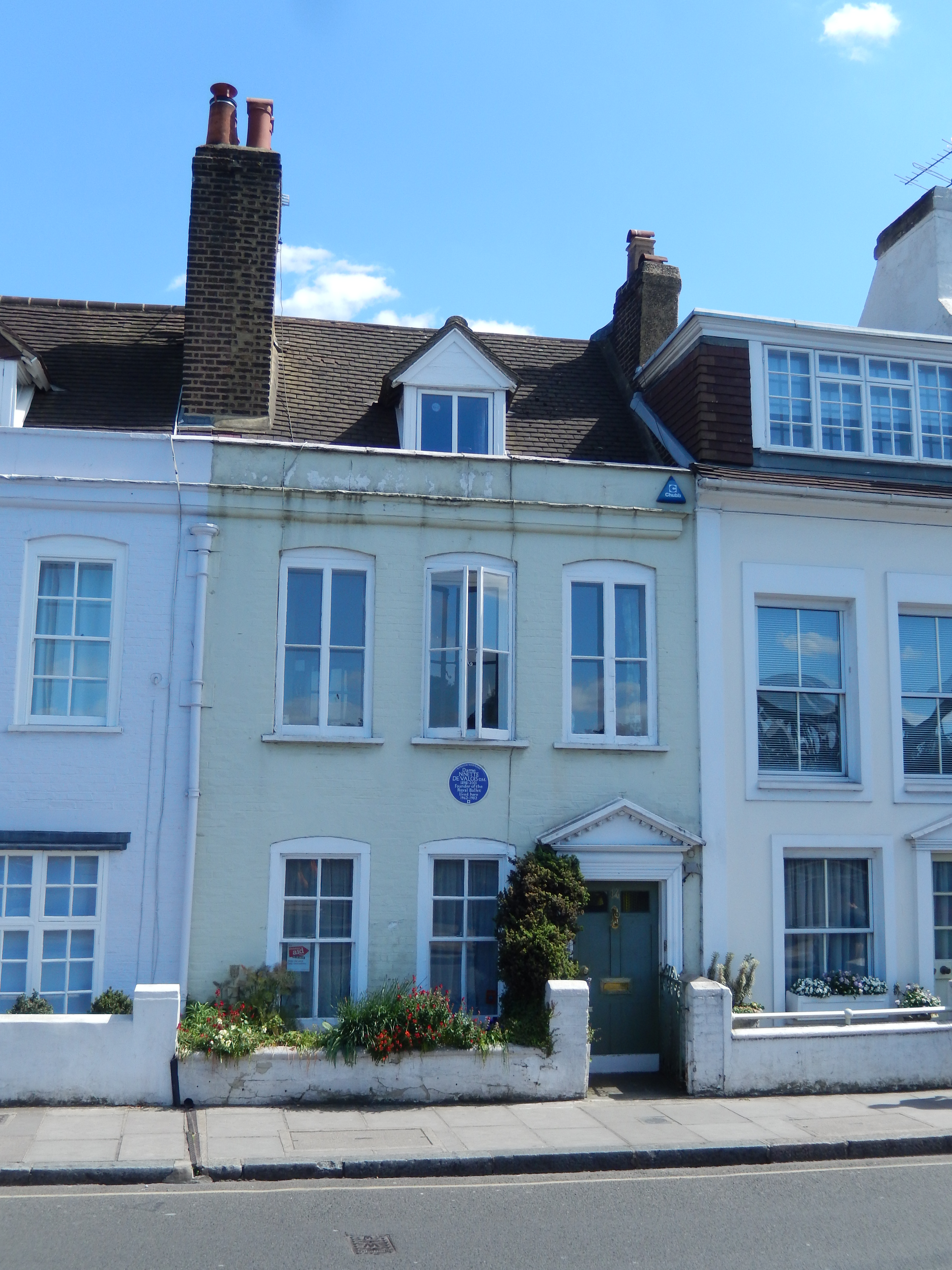
Ninette de Valois's house at 14 The Terrace, Barnes, facing the river, with English Heritage blue plaque, "Dame NINETTE DE VALOIS O.M. 1898–2001 Founder of the Royal Ballet lived here 1962–1982"

=== The Royal Ballet ===
In 1956, the ballet company and school were granted a Royal Charter by Queen Elizabeth II, and formally linked. De Valois made sure that her company had a constant supply of talent, and in later years it had such stars as Svetlana Beriosova, Antoinette Sibley, Nadia Nerina, Lynn Seymour, and, most sensationally, Rudolf Nureyev. She also invited choreographers such as Sir Kenneth MacMillan and George Balanchine to work with her company. She formally retired from the Royal Ballet directorship in 1963, but her presence continued to loom large in the company, and the same was true with the School, from which she formally retired in 1970.

De Valois acted as patron or supporter to a number of other projects, including the Cork Ballet Company and the Irish National Ballet Company in Ireland.

=== Turkish State Ballet ===
As with ballet in Britain and Ireland, de Valois exerted a great deal of influence on the development of ballet in Turkey, which had no prior history with the art form. The Turkish Government invited her to research the possibility of establishing a ballet school in the country, and she subsequently visited the country in the 1940s, going on to open a school following the same model as her Sadler's Wells Ballet School in London. Initially, very few people took the project seriously, but the school did become firmly established under the direction of Molly Lake and Travis Kemp, who in 1954 had undertaken to run it at de Valois' request; this ultimately led to the development of the Turkish State Ballet.

After training the first set of pupils at the new school, de Valois produced a number of early performances by the state ballet company, permitting guest appearances by Royal Ballet dancers including Margot Fonteyn, Nadia Nerina, Anya Linden, Michael Somes and David Blair. She mounted productions of the traditional classical repertoire including Coppélia, Giselle, Swan Lake and The Nutcracker, as well as the contemporary ballets Les Patineurs, Les Rendezvous and ' by Frederick Ashton, and her own ballets The Rake's Progress, Checkmate and Orpheus.

In 1965, de Valois produced and choreographed the first full-length work created for the new Turkish State Ballet. Titled Çeşmebaşı (At the Fountain), the ballet was the first to feature music composed by a Turkish composer, Ferit Tuzun, and its choreography incorporated elements of Turkish folk dance. Further ballets followed, and the company continued to develop. Today, ballet continues to be a thriving art form in Turkey, with the ballet school that de Valois established now forming part of the State Conservatory for Music and Drama at the Ankara State Conservatory.

=== Personal life ===
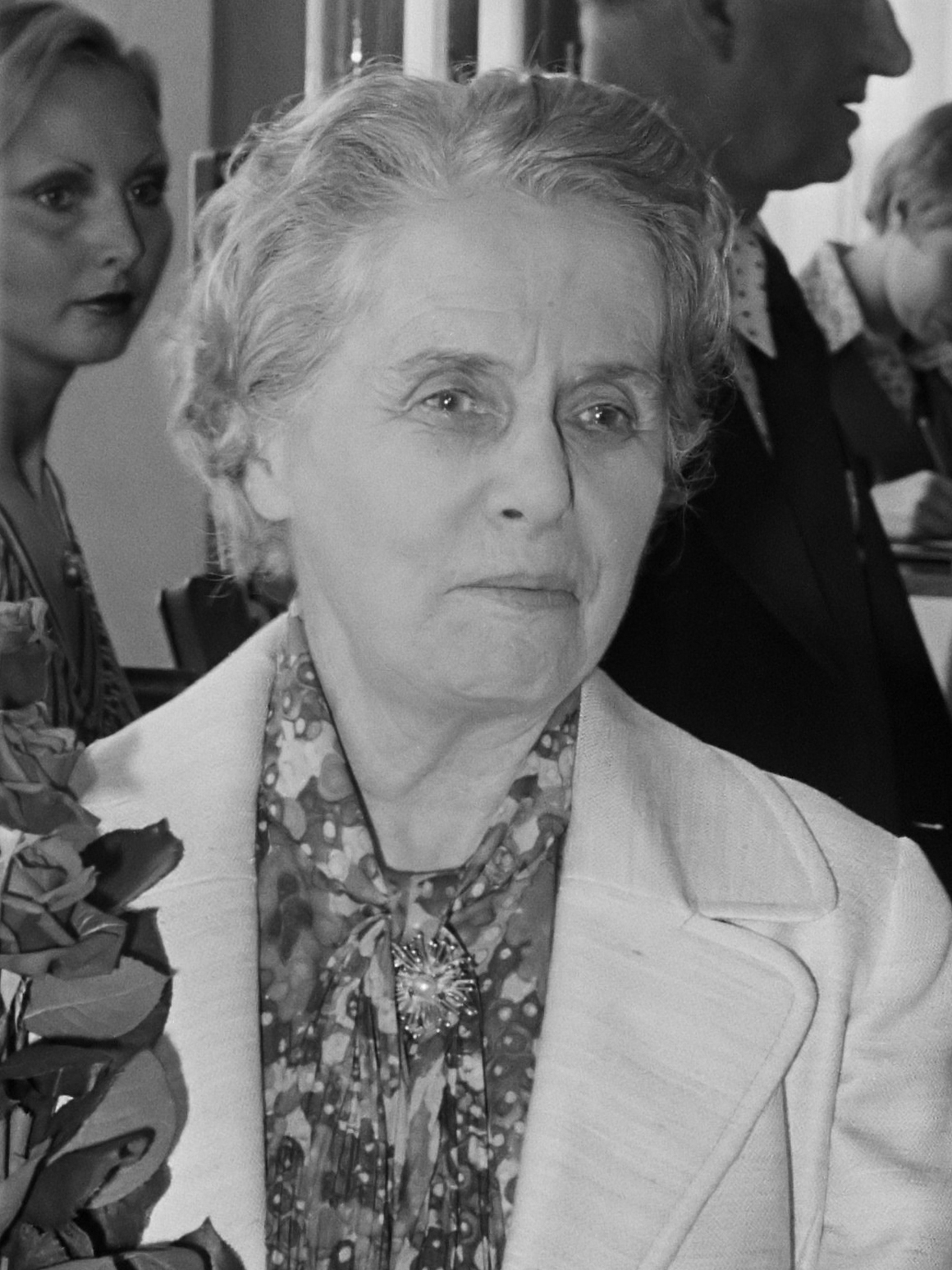
Ninette de Valois receiving the Erasmus Prize (1974)

In 1935, at Windsor, she married Dr Arthur Blackall Connell (1902–1987), a physician and surgeon from Wandsworth, who worked as a general practitioner in Barnes, London, where they lived, and later Sunningdale, Berkshire. She was his second wife; the union was childless, but de Valois had two step-sons, including Dr David Blackall Connell (born 1930), who, in 1955, married Susan Jean Carnegie, a daughter of John Carnegie, 12th Earl of Northesk; they had two sons and a daughter.

De Valois kept her private life very distinct from her professional, making only the briefest of references to her marriage in her autobiographical writings. In April 1964 she was the subject of This Is Your Life, when she was surprised by Eamonn Andrews at the home of the dancer Frederick Ashton in London. She continued to make public appearances until her death in London at the age of 102.

In 1991, de Valois appeared on BBC Radio 4's Desert Island Discs. Her chosen book was a collection of poems and her luxury item was an everlasting bottle of sleeping pills.

== Choreographic works ==
Among her earliest choreography was a production of the Greek tragedy Oresteia, which opened Terence Gray's Cambridge Festival Theatre in November 1926. De Valois first established herself as a choreographer producing several short ballets for The Old Vic, London. She also provided choreography for plays and operas at the theatre, all of which were performed by her own pupils. After forming the Vic-Wells Ballet, her first major production, Job (1931), was the first ballet to define the future of the British ballet repertoire.

Later, after employing Frederick Ashton as the company's first Principal Choreographer in 1935, de Valois collaborated with him to produce a series of signature ballets, which are recognized as cornerstones of British ballet. These included The Rake's Progress (1935) and Checkmate (1937).

=== Job (1931) ===
The oldest ballet in the Royal Ballet repertoire, Job is regarded as a crucial work in the development of British ballet and was the first ballet to be produced by an entirely British creative team. The ballet was produced and choreographed by de Valois, with a commissioned score entitled Job, a Masque for Dancing, written by Ralph Vaughan Williams, with orchestrations by Constant Lambert and designs by Gwendolen Raverat. The libretto for the ballet was written by Geoffrey Keynes and is based on William Blake's engraved edition of the Book of Job from the Hebrew Bible. Consisting of eight scenes, the ballet is inspired by Blake's engravings and so de Valois choreographed the ballet using predominantly mimed actions to create a simple decorative effect.

Job features a number of well-known dances, which continue to be performed regularly. The most recognised extracts are Satan's Dance, an acrobatic solo for a male dancer, the dance of Job's comforters, and the satirical expressionist dances representing War, Pestilence and Famine. Job had its world premiere on 5 July 1931, and was performed for members of the Camargo Society at the Cambridge Theatre, London. The first public performance of the ballet took place on 22 September 1931 at the Old Vic Theatre.

=== Other works ===
Ninette de Valois' other works include:

- The Haunted Ballroom (1934)
- Bar aux Folies-Bergère (1934), for The Ballet Club
- The Rake's Progress (1935)
- As You Like It (1936)
- Checkmate (1937)
- Every Goose Can
- The Gods Go A-Begging
- Barabau
- The Prospect Before Us (1940)
- Keloğlan (1950)
- At the Fountain Head (1963)
- Çeşmebaşı (1965), for the Turkish State Opera and Ballet
- Sinfonietta (1966)
- Coppèlia

== Honours and awards ==
=== Honours ===
Ninette de Valois was appointed Commander of the Order of the British Empire (CBE) on 1 January 1947 and was promoted Dame Commander (DBE) on 1 January 1951. She became a Member of the Order of the Companions of Honour (CH) on 31 December 1981 and was honoured by HM The Queen with the Order of Merit (OM) on 2 January 1992.

She was appointed a knighthood of France's Legion of Honour on 1 May 1950. and received the Order of Merit of the Republic of Turkey on 2 January 1998.

=== Awards ===
Ninette de Valois received the Bronze award presented for services to Ballet from the Irish Catholic Stage Guild in 1949. She was the first recipient of the Royal Academy of Dance Queen Elizabeth II Coronation Award in 1953–1954. She was made Honorary Fellow of the Royal Academy of Dance on 19 July 1963 and of the Imperial Society of Teachers of Dancing on 8 March 1964 In 1964 she received the Royal Society of Arts Albert Medal and in 1974, the Praemium Erasmianum Foundation Erasmus Prize. The Queen Elizabeth II Silver Jubilee Medal was awarded on 7 June 1977 and the Royal Opera House Long Service medal in 1979.

She received the Critics' Circle Award for Distinguished Service to the Arts in 1989 and the Society of London Theatre Laurence Olivier Award Special Award in 1992.

In the United States, she received the Dance Theatre of Harlem Emergence Award on 27 July 1981.

=== Honorary degrees ===
Ninette de Valois received Doctor of Music (DMus) degrees from the University of London in 1947, the University of Sheffield on 29 June 1955, Trinity College Dublin in 1957 and Durham University in 1982.

She received DLitt from the University of Reading in 1951, the University of Oxford in 1955 and the University of Ulster in 1979.

In 1958 she received an LLD from the University of Aberdeen and on 5 July 1975 Doctor of Letters from the University of Sussex.

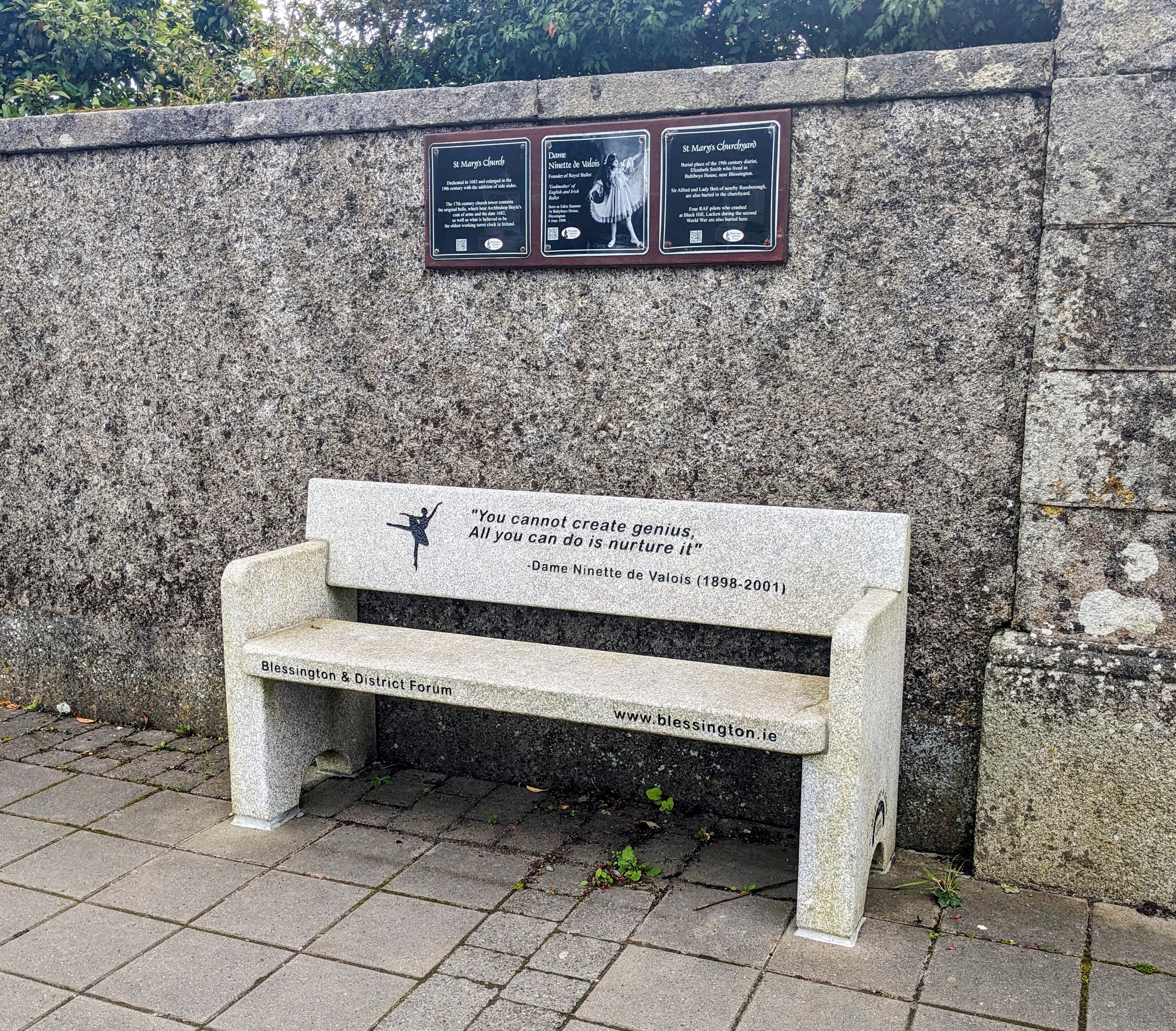
Ninette de Valois memorial bench in Blessington, Co. Wicklow

=== Ninette de Valois Festival of Dance ===
The Ninette de Valois Festival of Dance has been held annually in de Valois' hometown of Blessington, Co. Wicklow since 2018. The festival was postponed due to the COVID-19 pandemic but resumed in 2022. A memorial bench to de Valois is situated outside St Mary's Church in Blessington.

== Bibliography ==
- de Valois, Ninette (1937). Invitation to the Ballet. London: Bodley Head. OCLC 59460167.
- de Valois, Ninette (1957). Come Dance with Me; A Memoir, 1898–1956. London: H. Hamilton. OCLC 4063947.
  - de Valois, Ninette (1992) [1957]. Come Dance With Me; A Memoir, 1898–1956. Dublin: Lilliput Press. ISBN 0-946640-62-9. Reprint of de Valois (1957).
- de Valois, Ninette (1977). Step by Step: The Formation of an Establishment. London: W. H. Allen. ISBN 0-491-01598-4.

== See also ==
- Category:Ballets by Ninette de Valois
- List of people on the postage stamps of Ireland
- Women in dance
- Legion of Honour
- List of Legion of Honour recipients by name (V)
- Legion of Honour Museum
