= Phyllis Bedells =

British ballerina and dance teacher

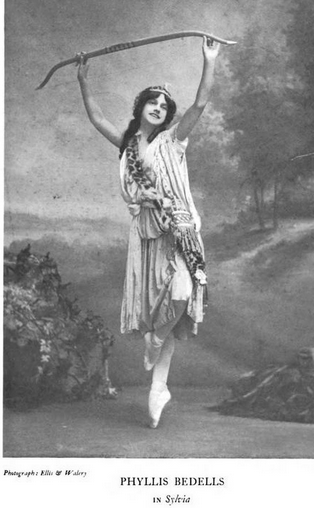
- Phyllis Bedells in character, from a 1912 publication.
- Born: Ethel Phyllis Bedells; 9 August 1893; Bristol, England
- Died: 2 May 1985 (aged 91); Henley on Thames, England
- Occupations: Ballet dancer; dance teacher
- Children: Jean Bedells, David

Phyllis Bedells (9 August 1893 – 2 May 1985) was a British ballerina and dance teacher.

== Early life ==
Ethel Phyllis Bedells was born in Knowle, Bristol. Her father was a clerk for the Bristol Gas Company; both parents were musical. Her father founded the Bristol Amateur Operatic Society, and both Phyllis and her mother appeared in the society's productions. She attended a theatrical school in Nottingham. She studied ballet with Malvina Cavallazzi, Alexander Genée, Adolph Bolm, Enrico Cecchetti, and Anna Pavlova.

== Career ==
From 1907 Bedells was a dancer at the London Empire Theatre and became the first British prima ballerina there in 1914. She left in 1916 to dance in West End musical revues and in opera ballets at Covent Garden. She appeared in two silent films, Fairyland (1916) and The Land of Mystery (1920). She was a founding member of the Royal Academy of Dance in 1920 and helped to draw up its first syllabus. She was also a member of the Camargo Society. In 1931, she appeared as a guest artist with the Vic-Wells Ballet.

Bedells retired from performing in 1935, giving a farewell performance at the London Hippodrome. She became a ballet teacher and an examiner for the Royal Academy of Dance. During the Second World War, she taught ballet at the Palais de Danse in St Ives, Cornwall. She published her autobiography, My Dancing Days, in 1954. In 1976, she recorded an interview for the Dance Oral History Project at the New York Public Library. In 1979, the annual Phyllis Bedells Bursary was established in her honour.

== Personal life ==
Bedells married Major Ian Gordon McBean in 1918. They had a son and a daughter. Their daughter, Jean Bedells (1924-2014), was also a dancer, as was Jean's daughter, Anne Bedells. She died in 1985, in Henley on Thames, aged 91 years. There is a collection of her papers in the Royal Academy of Dance Archives. A ballet costume worn by Bedells in 1933 is in the collection of the Victoria and Albert Museum.
