= Royal Academy of Dance =

UK examination board for dance education

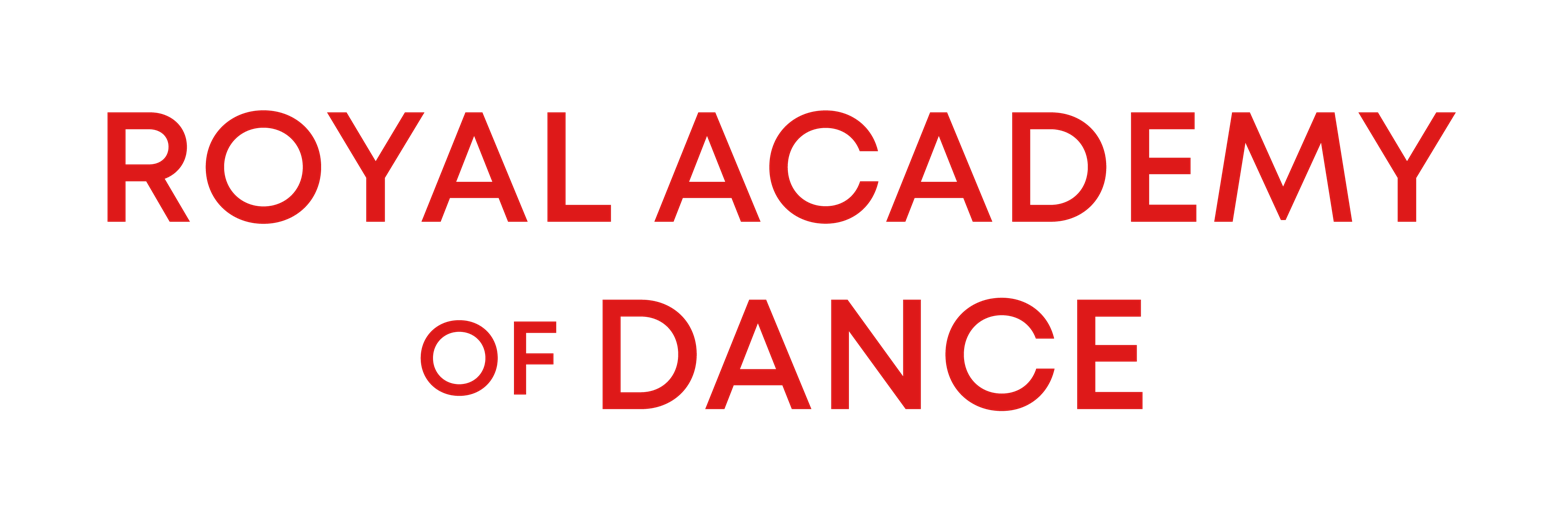
- Official logo
- Abbreviation: RAD
- Formation: 1920
- Type: NGO
- Legal status: Registered charity
- Purpose: Dance Awarding organisation – dance education and training
- Headquarters: 188 York Road; SW11 3JZ
- Location: London
- Coordinates: 51.466398°N 0.179116°W
- Region served: Worldwide
- Members: 13,000+
- Official language: English
- Patron: Queen Camilla
- President: Dame Darcey Bussell, DBE
- Chief Executive: Elizabeth Honer CB
- Artistic Director: Alexander Campbell (dancer)
- Main organ: Board of Trustees
- Affiliations: Ofqual; Council for Dance Education and Training; International Dance Teachers Association
- Website: www.royalacademyofdance.org
- Formerly called: Association of Teachers of Operatic Dancing

The Royal Academy of Dance (RAD) is a UK-based examination board specialising in dance education and training, with an emphasis on classical ballet. The RAD was founded in London, United Kingdom, in 1920 as the Association of Teachers of Operatic Dancing, and was granted a Royal Charter in 1935. Queen Camilla is patron of the RAD, and Darcey Bussell was elected to serve as president in 2012, succeeding Antoinette Sibley who served for 21 years.

The RAD was created with the objective to improve the standard of ballet teaching in the UK. In pursuit of improving instruction, a new teaching method and dance technique was devised for the Academy by a group of eminent European dancers. The RAD is one of the largest dance organisations in the world with over 13,000 members in 85 countries, including about 7,500 who hold Registered Teacher Status. There are currently about 1,000 students in full-time or part-time teacher training programmes with the RAD, and each year about 200,000 candidates enter RAD examinations worldwide.

RAD exams are recognised by the national qualifications regulators of all four UK nations (England, Scotland, Wales and Northern Ireland) with selected exams also carrying a UCAS tariff towards university admission. The RAD is also a validated awarding body of the Council for Dance Education and Training. The RAD works in partnership with the International Dance Teachers' Association. Royal Academy of Dance is charity 312826 registered in England and Wales.

== History ==
=== 1920 ===
On 18 July 1920, Phillip J. S. Richardson, then Editor of Dancing Times magazine, organised a dinner for eminent dance professionals at the former Trocadero Restaurant in Piccadilly. The diners included five special guests, representing the principal methods of ballet training in use at that time.

- Phyllis Bedells – English Method
- Lucia Cormani – Italian Method
- Edouard Espinosa – French Method
- Adeline Genée – Bournonville Method, Denmark
- Tamara Karsavina – Imperial Method, Russia

Other guests included Ninette de Valois, the founder of England's Royal Ballet company, and Anton Dolin, the co-founder of English National Ballet. The purpose of the meeting was to discuss the poor quality of dance training in Britain at that time and following further meetings, the Association of Teachers of Operatic Dancing of Great Britain was formed, with Adeline Genée as its first President. The Association would be the predecessor of the RAD.

=== 1921–1928 ===
In 1921, the Association established headquarters at the offices of Dancing Times magazine in London and the first Elementary, Intermediate and Advanced level examinations were held in the years that followed, with the first Children's syllabus being published and then examined in 1923 and 1924. In 1927 a scholarship scheme was introduced for students studying dance with an Association member and in 1928, Queen Mary consented to become Patron of the Association of Teachers of Operatic Dancing.

=== 1930–1934 ===
In November 1930, the first issue of Dance Gazette was published containing a historical review of the Association's first ten years. 'Dance Gazette' is still the official magazine of the RAD, now digitally distributed quarterly to all fully paid members. In 1931, the first Genée International Ballet Competition for female dancers was held in London, with awards for male dancers being introduced later in 1939. The competition is the RAD's flagship annual event, named after Dame Adeline Genée DBE. The competition was introduced as an additional incentive for candidates who had passed the Solo Seal examination, and has taken place almost every year since 1931, even during the Second World War. In 1934, the Royal Opera House, Covent Garden agreed to an alliance with the Association and a Grand Council of men & women was formed to act as a governing body to advise the executive committee.

=== 1935–1937 ===
RAD Coat of Arms

In 1935 King George V approved the granting of a Royal Charter for the Association of Teachers of Operatic Dancing. The charter was eventually affixed with his Great Seal in 1936, and the Association of Teachers of Operatic Dancing officially became the 'Royal Academy of Dancing' (RAD). The following year in 1937, a coat of arms was designed by the College of Arms in London.

==== Coat of Arms ====
The RAD coat of arts was granted by the College of Arms in 1937, designed by the Hon. George Bellew, Somerset Herald of Arms and Registrar. The crest at the top of the coat of arms is a figure of Terpsichore, one of the Muses from Greek mythology, representing dance. The supporter at either side of the shield is a winged doe, symbolising lightness and grace of movement. The Escutcheon shows a pentagram symbolising health, with a wavy and zigzag line conveying the movement of dancing. The motto 'Salus et Felicitas' translates to mean health and happiness.

=== 1950–1954 ===
In 1950, founder President of the RAD Adeline Genée was appointed a Dame Commander of the Order of the British Empire in the New Year Honours List. Further honours were awarded to members of the Academy in 1951, with Ninette de Valois being appointed a Dame, Philip Richardson being awarded an Order of the British Empire (OBE) and Margot Fonteyn awarded a Commander of the Order of the British Empire (CBE). Following the death of Queen Mary in 1953, Queen Elizabeth II consented to become the Royal Patron of the Royal Academy of Dancing and Dame Adeline Genée instituted the Queen Elizabeth II Coronation Award to mark the occasion. The award is presented annually in recognition of outstanding services to the art of ballet. The first recipient was Dame Ninette de Valois, founder of The Royal Ballet Company. The following is a list of selected recipients of the award.

- Phyllis Bedells, the first recognised English ballerina and a founder member of the RAD
- Tamara Karsavina, Russian ballerina, founder member of the RAD and vice-president for over 30 years
- Ninette De Valois, dancer, choreographer and director, founder of the Royal Ballet, Birmingham Royal Ballet and *Royal Ballet School
- Anton Dolin, dancer, choreographer and director, co-founder of the English National Ballet
- Marie Rambert, founder of the first professional dance company in the UK, which survives today as Rambert Dance Company
- Alicia Markova, English prima ballerina assoluta and co-founder of English National Ballet
- Beryl Grey, dancer and director, former RAD vice-president and life president of the Imperial Society of Teachers of Dancing
- Rudolph Nureyev, Russian dancer, choreographer, director and former artistic director of Paris Opera Ballet
- Frederick Ashton, founder choreographer and former artistic director of the Royal Ballet
- Robert Helpmann, Australian dancer, actor, choreographer and director, most famous for playing the Child Catcher in the film Chitty Chitty Bang Bang
- Gillian Lynne, former ballet dancer, most famous as a choreographer of West End and Broadway musicals including Cats
- Antoinette Sibley, former ballet dancer who served as President of the RAD from 1991 to 2012.

Dame Adeline Genée retired as President of the RAD in 1954 and Dame Margot Fonteyn was elected as her successor. The leading Principal dancer of the Royal Ballet at that time and considered the greatest Ballerina of her generation, Fonteyn was later appointed Prima Ballerina Assoluta of the Royal Ballet by Queen Elizabeth II.

=== 1963–1968 ===
In 1963, the Academy was granted charitable status. In 1965, the first RAD summer school was held at Elmhurst Ballet School in Camberley, Surrey. Teachers and dancers attended the summer school from the United States, Canada, New Zealand as well as the UK. In 1968, Dame Margot Fonteyn devised a new children's syllabus, which would become the basis for lower graded examinations.

=== 1970–1975 ===
On 23 April 1970, Founder President of the Academy, Dame Adeline Genée died at the age of 92 and in 1972, the RAD moved into its previous headquarters in Battersea Square, London. The building was fully refurbished to provide high quality dance facilities and was officially opened by Queen Elizabeth II in 1974. The following year in 1975, the Academy established the Professional Dancer's Teaching Diploma, an intensive course for professional ballet dancers and other dance professionals to gain registered teacher status with the RAD and in 1976, the RAD's teacher training schemes were organised into what is now officially the Faculty of Education of the RAD.

=== 1979 ===
In 1979, a new bursary was founded and named in honour of Phyllis Bedells, a founder member and former vice-president of the RAD. The bursary of £1,000 is held annually, awarded for further training in the academy's method and is awarded to young dancers who are under 17 years of age and have passed RAD Advanced 1 with Distinction but have not entered for the Advanced 2 examination. Past winners have gone on to win medals in very high-profile competitions, such as the Genée International Ballet Competition, and to dance with world-renowned companies including the Australian Ballet, Dutch National Ballet, English National Ballet, London City Ballet, Maurice Béjart and The Royal Ballet. Payment of the Bursary can be offset against existing tuition fees where the winner may be studying, or against material / equipment needed for the winner to continue their training.

=== 1983 ===
In 1983, the RAD opened its first International headquarters in Darlinghurst, New South Wales, Australia. Since that time, the RAD has opened offices worldwide, including Brazil, China, Germany, Greece, Israel, Italy, Jamaica, Japan, Mexico, New Zealand, Singapore, South Africa, Spain, United Arab Emirates and the United States of America,

=== 1990–1992 ===
In 1990, a new studio complex was opened at RAD headquarters. Titled the 'Fonteyn Centre', it was opened by Queen Elizabeth II. The following year in 1991, Dame Margot Fonteyn died on 21 February in Panama City and Antoinette Sibley was elected as the RAD's third President. Also in 1991, the 'Graded Examination Syllabus' was introduced, with Grades 6, 7 and 8 being introduced later in 1992. In 1990 the Faculty of Education was launched, which now delivers undergraduate and postgraduate university programmes of study and RAD awards (at higher education level). The three-year teacher training course was also amended in 1992, being replaced by the RAD's first full-time Degree qualification, the BA (Hons) Art & Teaching of Ballet (now the BA in Ballet Education).

=== 1995–1999 ===
The RAD celebrated its 75th anniversary in 1995, the event being marked by events throughout the world. In 1996, RAD President Antoinette Sibley was appointed a Dame in the Queen's New Year Honours List and the Academy's first 12-degree students attended their graduation at Durham Castle. In 1997, the Benesh Institute was incorporated into the RAD and in 1999, The 'Faculty of Education' was established with further teaching qualifications being launched, validated by the University of Durham.

=== 2000 ===
On 20 December 2000, the RAD officially adopted its current title, "Royal Academy of Dance" and in the same year, qualifications were established for students studying 'Benesh Movement Notation'.

=== 2010 ===
In 2010 the RAD became an Accredited Institute of the University of Surrey.

=== 2011 ===
On 4 January 2011 in London and 17 January in Sydney, the RAD launched its new Intermediate Foundation & Intermediate syllabi. RAD Grades 1–8 and the first five levels of the Vocational Grades were accredited by the Office of Qualifications and Examinations Regulation (Ofqual) in England with the RAD as an Awarding Organisation, and the Academy also achieved SQA Accreditation (Scottish Qualifications Authority Accreditation) for RAD exams. UCAS tariff points for Graded and Vocational Graded Examinations in Dance at Level 3 were confirmed in August, meaning those candidates who have achieved a Pass or higher at Grades 6–8, Intermediate or Advanced Foundation can use their exam result as contributing towards their points tariff when applying to a university or Higher Education institution in the UK. The Genée International Ballet Competition 2011 was held for the first time in Cape Town, South Africa, at Artscape Theatre Centre, looking to present the competition in New Zealand in 2012. The first ever Dance Proms took place on Sunday 13 November at the Royal Albert Hall, London, as a partnership project between the International Dance Teachers Association, the Imperial Society of Teachers of Dancing, RAD and the Royal Albert Hall working together in celebration of dance and hosting more than 450 young dancers on the stage. UK and Republic of Ireland members from the three dance organisations were invited to video and submit a short dance piece online, and a variety of acts were then chosen both by an esteemed panel of professionals and through a public vote to perform live at the Royal Albert Hall.

=== 2022 ===
In 2022, the new Royal Academy of Dance global headquarters in Battersea was formally opened by HRH The Duchess of Cornwall.

=== 2024 ===
In May 2024, Queen Camilla became patron of the RAD.

== Examinations ==
The RAD offers two examination syllabi, which are suitable for both male and female students and form the basis of the RAD's work in the UK and overseas. Each programme consists of a series of progressively more difficult practical examinations.

- Graded Examination Syllabus
- Vocational Graded Examination Syllabus

Grades 1–8 and the first five levels of the Vocational Grades are accredited by the Office of Qualifications and Examinations Regulation (Ofqual) in England, the Qualifications Wales in Wales and the Council for the Curriculum, Examinations & Assessment (CCEA) in Northern Ireland. These organisations are the Government approved qualifications regulators for their respective countries. Candidates who successfully pass an RAD examination are awarded credit on the Qualifications and Credit Framework. The Academy also achieves SQA Accreditation (Scottish Qualifications Authority Accreditation) for RAD exams.

In 2009, the RAD launched a new syllabus at Pre-Primary and Primary level in dance. These two new grades replace the existing Pre-Primary and Primary grades in ballet. The Academy has since launched new work for grades 1–5

=== Graded Syllabus ===
The Graded Examination Syllabus consists of Pre-Primary, Primary, and numbered Grades 1–8. Each grade incorporates classical ballet, free movement and character dance. The syllabus is devised to progress in difficulty from one grade to the next and a student studying the grades in sequence would be expected to develop a greater degree of dance technique at each level.

- Classical Ballet is one of the most widespread dance forms in the world. Originating in the Italian royal courts of the Renaissance period, over hundreds of years it has been developed into a highly technical dance form. Ballet is the foundation of the RAD's work and is the most important part of the Graded Syllabi.
- Free Movement is the term applied to movement from dance styles such as natural movement, contemporary and Classical Greek dance. Free movement does not have to include codified dance vocabulary and is usually an improvisation based on the students interpretation of a piece of music or stimulus.
- Character Dance is an integral part of classical ballet repertoire. It is the stylised representation of a traditional folk dance, normally from a European country and uses movements and music which have been adapted for the theatre. The RAD syllabus uses character dances based on Hungarian, Russian and Polish folk dance.

Students who have studied a complete grade from the syllabus will normally take an examination organised by their dance teacher and held at the teachers studio or a suitable venue hired for the occasion. In the examination, the students perform the relevant grade work for an RAD examiner, who assesses the artistic and technical execution of the grade. A successful candidate receives a certificate printed with their name and the grade passed. They also receive a report detailing what marks were awarded and highlighting which aspects of their performance need further improvement. Unsuccessful candidates receive a report and a certificate of participation. The Pre-Primary grade is devised for younger students who are not old enough to enter the Primary examination. There is no examination offered at this level, however students can take part in a Presentation Class.

Presentation Classes were introduced for students who a dance teacher feels may not benefit from, or be suitable for taking the series of examinations. In a Presentation Class, in contrast to an examination, the teacher and a small audience of spectators are present in the room. The students perform for an examiner but are not assessed. They dance a condensed selection of exercises from the appropriate grade and receive a certificate of participation, which is normally presented by the examiner at the end of the class.

As a syllabus devised specifically with children in mind, examinations are not compulsory. The entry level of a new student is decided by the dance teacher based upon the child's age, natural ability for dance or previous examination passes with another dance school or examination board, such as the IDTA or ISTD.

==== Grades ====
The Grades are:

- Pre-Primary – 5 years and over
- Primary – 6 years and over
- Grade 1 – 7 years and over
- Grade 2 – 7 years and over
- Grade 3 – 7 years and over
- Grade 4 – 7 years and over
- Grade 5 – 7 years and over
- Grade 6 – 11 years and over
- Grade 7 – 11 years and over
- Grade 8 – 11 years and over

=== Vocational Graded Syllabus ===
The Vocational Graded Syllabus is designed primarily for older children or young adults who are considering a career in professional dance, as a performer, teacher or in another capacity. The vocational syllabus is technically demanding and comprises only Classical Ballet and Pointe Work. Students choosing to study this series of awards are required to be competent in the fundamentals of ballet technique and movement vocabulary.

Unlike the Graded Examination Syllabus, the vocational grades have to be studied in sequence and the student must successfully pass an examination at each level before progressing onto the next. All vocational examinations are organised by RAD headquarters and instead of being held at a dance teachers own venue, they are held in major cities worldwide. In this situation, the session organiser is responsible for timetabling the examinations, and it is normal for students to dance alongside the students of other dance schools in the examination room. As with the graded syllabus, successful candidates receive a certificate personalised with their name and the level passed. They also receive a report, however for this series of examinations, there is a different marking system and assessment criteria.

Students studying the vocational syllabus are expected to achieve a high level of technical and artistic ability in ballet and it can take a great deal of time and commitment to reach the standard required to pass these examinations. Normally, a student will begin studying the Vocational Graded Syllabus after completing Grade 5 in the Graded Examination Syllabus, however some students will continue to study the graded syllabus at the same time. The Intermediate Foundation and Advanced Foundation examinations are the only optional exams in this series of awards. They are devised for students who the teacher feels may need more preparation before studying at the higher level, however they are assessed in the same way, certificates awarded in the same way and credits awarded on the National Qualifications Framework.

==== The Vocational Grades ====
- Intermediate Foundation – 11 years and over (non-compulsory)
- Intermediate – 12 years and over
- Advanced Foundation – 13 years and over (non-compulsory)
- Advanced 1 – 14 years and over (must have passed Intermediate)
- Advanced 2 – 15 years and over (must have passed Advanced 1)
- Solo Seal – 15 years and over (must have passed Advanced 2 with distinction)

== LRAD ==
The Licentiate of the Royal Academy of Dance (LRAD) is a programme to allow students who already have, or are in the process of finishing, qualifications for a dance degree, to specialise in Royal Academy of Dance work. It has no practical placement component, but instead comprises "intensive practical study supported by lectures, presentations, peer teaching and seminars".

== RAD Method ==
The RAD method, is a ballet technique and training system, specially devised by the founders of the RAD, who merged their respective dance methods (Italian, French, Danish and Russian) to create a new style of ballet that is unique to the organisation. The RAD method produces a style of ballet that has become recognised internationally as the English style of ballet.

The most identifiable aspect of the RAD method is the attention to detail when learning the basic steps, and the progression in difficulty is often very slow. While the difficulty of an exercise may only increase slightly from grade to grade, more importance is placed on whether the student is performing the step with improved technique. For example, plie exercises are employed consistently throughout the lower grades to enable the student to progressively deepen the plie and improve turnout. The principle behind this is that if enough time is spent achieving optimal technique before introducing new vocabulary, the easier it is for the student to learn the harder steps, while exercising basic technique to the maximum at all times.

== Associations ==
From 1 October 2006, the RAD began a new association with the International Dance Teachers Association, a dance organisation based in Brighton, England. A press release issued to members of each organisation stated that "the two organisations would embark on a process of working together for the future of dance and to the mutual benefit of their members in both teacher education and training and examinations".

As a result of this association, both organisations have formally granted teachers of the respective organisation the opportunity to enter candidates for its examinations thereby ensuring that both organisations recognise the right of qualified teachers to enter candidates for examinations of either awarding body. At the RAD these members are called 'teachers recognised by mutual agreement'. Whilst the new association is not a merger, it is intended that it will develop co-operation between the two organisations and mutual recognition of the training and qualifications that they both provide.

Dance Proms is a partnership project between the IDTA, the ISTD, RAD and the Royal Albert Hall working together in celebration of dance. In 2011, Dance Proms hosted more than 450 young dancers on the stage, showcasing a huge range of dance styles and cultural influences. UK and Republic of Ireland members from the three dance organisations are invited to video and submit a short dance piece online, featuring original choreography by themselves or their students in any dance genre, either as a solo, duet, or group performance. Acts are then chosen both by an esteemed panel of professionals and through a public vote to be performed live at the Royal Albert Hall. Dance Proms is designed to showcase the high standards of dance and dance teaching of the organisations and their members, and to raise standards and increase participation in and appreciation of dance in the UK.

== Countries ==
The Royal Academy of Dance is currently active in over 80 countries worldwide. The following is a list of countries, by region, in which the RAD has active members, including the locations of regional administrative offices:

UK & Ireland

- England – Regional Office, London
- Ireland
- Northern Ireland
- Scotland
- Wales

Europe

- Andorra
- Austria
- Belgium
- Cyprus – Regional Office, Limassol
- Denmark
- France
- Germany – Regional Office, Berlin
- Gibraltar
- Greece – Regional Office, Athens
- Italy – Regional Office, Trento
- Luxembourg – Regional Office, Gonderange
- Malta – Regional Office, Sliema
- Netherlands
- Norway – Regional Office, Trondheim
- Portugal – Regional Office, Lisbon
- Serbia
- Slovenia
- Spain – Regional Office, Reus
- Sweden
- Switzerland
- Turkey – Regional Office, Istanbul

North America

- United States – Regional Office, St. Francis
- Canada – Regional Office, Toronto
- Mexico – Regional Office, Naucalpan

Caribbean, Central and South America

- Antigua & Barbuda
- Aruba
- Bahamas
- Barbados
- Bermuda
- Brazil – Regional Office, Serra Negra
- Chile
- Costa Rica
- Ecuador
- El Salvador
- Guadeloupe
- Guatemala
- Honduras
- Jamaica – Regional Office, Kingston

Mexico

- Panama
- Peru
- St. Lucia
- Trinidad and Tobago
- Venezuela

Asia and Pacific

- Australia – Regional Office, Darlinghurst
- Brunei
- China – Regional Office, Shanghai
- Hong Kong – Regional Office, Kowloon
- Indonesia – Regional Office, South Jakarta
- Japan – Regional Office, Tokyo
- Macau
- Malaysia – Regional Office, Kuala Lumpur
- New Zealand – Regional Office, Wellington
- Papua New Guinea
- Philippines – Regional Office, Pasig
- Singapore
- South Korea – Regional Office, Seoul
- Taiwan – Regional Office, Taipei
- Thailand – Regional Office, Chiang Mai

Africa, Middle East and South Asia

- Bahrain
- Bangladesh
- Bhutan
- Botswana
- Ghana
- India
- Israel – Regional Office, Neve Yamin
- Jordan
- Kenya
- Kuwait
- Lebanon
- Lesotho
- Maldives
- Mauritius
- Mozambique
- Namibia
- Nepal
- Oman
- Pakistan
- Qatar
- South Africa – Regional Office, Johannesburg
- Sri Lanka – Regional Office, Rajagiriya
- Swaziland
- United Arab Emirates – Regional Office, Dubai
- Zimbabwe

== Notable alumni ==
- Jacqui Chan, Trinidadian actress
- Mary Day, American dance teacher
- Ana Paula Höfling, American dance researcher
- Michelle Yeoh, Malaysian actress
- Beatriz Luengo, actress, singer and dancer
- Tara Sutaria, Indian actress and singer.

Ballet Schools & Companies – A number of international ballet schools offer their students the opportunity to take vocational examinations with the RAD. Examples include:

- Elmhurst Ballet School
- English National Ballet School
- National Ballet School of Canada
- Royal Ballet School

The Royal Academy of Dance is not affiliated to any of these schools.

== See also ==
- UKA Dance
- Imperial Society of Teachers of Dancing (ISTD)
- International Dance Teachers Association (IDTA)
- Ballet
- Benesh Movement Notation
- Genée International Ballet Competition
