= Dominic Antonucci =

American dancer

- Born: Dominic Antonucci; 14 February; Ohio, United States
- Education: Nan Klinger School of Dance, School of American Ballet
- Known for: Ballet
- Awards: USA International Ballet Competition, Finalist

Dominic Antonucci is a ballet master and ex-principal dancer with the Birmingham Royal Ballet (BRB). He was raised in Akron, Ohio, having been born in nearby Athens. He first attended the Nan Klinger School of Dance from age eight and subsequently the School of American Ballet in New York City. Dominic joined American Ballet Theatre in 1991 and BRB in 1994 as a soloist, where he was promoted to principal in 2003. He was appointed Ballet Master in 2009.

== Roles ==
=== George Balanchine ===
- The Four Temperaments Theme 2
- Orpheus Dark Angel
- Slaughter on Tenth Avenue The Gangster
- Serenade
- Western Symphony

=== Frederick Ashton ===
- La Fille mal gardée Colas and Thomas
- Enigma Variations Troyte Griffith
- Façade Dago
- The Two Pigeons Gypsy Lover
- Dante Sonata
- Scènes de ballet
- Symphonic Variations

=== David Bintley ===
- Arthur Kay, White Dragon, Uriens, Gawain and Uther Pendragon
- Beauty and the Beast Beast
- Carmina Burana Third Seminarian
- Edward II Mortimer
- Far from the Madding Crowd Oak
- Hobson's Choice Fred Beenstock
- Salvation Army
- The Nutcracker Sweeties Floreador
- The Orpheus Suite Aristaeus, Apollo
- The Shakespeare Suite Petruchio
- The Sons of Horus Duamutef
- 'Still Life' at the Penguin Cafe Brazilian Woolly Monkey
- Giselle Peasant pas de deux and Hilarion (David Bintley and Galina Samsova's production)

=== John Cranko ===
- Brouillards "Feuilles mortes" and "Des Pas sur la neige"
- The Lady and the Fool Midas
- Pineapple Poll Captain Belaye

=== Kenneth MacMillan ===
- Romeo and Juliet Romeo, Benvolio and Paris
- Elite Syncopations "Bethena Concert Waltz"
- Solitaire

=== Hans van Manen ===
- Five Tangos
- Grosse Fuge

=== Nahid Siddiqui ===
- Krishna title role

=== Ninette de Valois ===
- Checkmate Second Red Knight

=== Peter Wright Productions ===
- Coppélia Franz
- The Nutcracker Prince and Drosselmeyer
- The Sleeping Beauty Bluebird
- Swan Lake Siegfried and Benno (Peter Wright and Galina Samsova's production)

== Awards ==
- Finalist, Jackson International Ballet Competition, 1994
