= Natasha Oughtred =

English ballerina and former principal dancer

- Born: North Cave, East Riding of Yorkshire, England
- Education: Royal Ballet School
- Occupation: Ballet dancer
- Years active: 2000–2015
- Awards: Genée International Ballet Competition – Royal Academy of Dance – Silver Medal (2000)
- Career
- Former groups: The Royal Ballet; Birmingham Royal Ballet
- Dances: Classical ballet

Natasha Oughtred is an English ballerina and retired principal dancer with the Birmingham Royal Ballet. She trained at the Royal Ballet School and began her dance education in Hull, where she was a former student of the Skelton Hooper School of Dance.

== Biography ==
Natasha Oughtred was born in North Cave, a village near Kingston upon Hull in the East Riding of Yorkshire. She began to study dance at the age of 3 with the Skelton Hooper School of Dance in Hull, under the guidance of the Principal Vanessa Hooper, a former soloist of The Royal Ballet. She has achieved examination passes with the Royal Academy of Dance and the International Dance Teachers' Association. She later received additional coaching in ballet from Niall McMahon, a former dancer with the Scottish Ballet and artistic director of New English Contemporary Ballet. After reaching the semi-finals of the prestigious Prix de Lausanne, she received a scholarship to continue her training at the upper school of the Royal Ballet School and joined The Royal Ballet company in 2000, eventually being promoted to the rank of Soloist. Oughtred joined the Birmingham Royal Ballet as a Soloist in 2007. She was promoted to First Soloist rank in 2008 and was promoted to the most senior rank of Principal in 2009. Oughtred continued her professional activity in the following years. A 2016 review mentions her appearance as Titania during a January 2015 performance of The Dream.

== Created roles ==
- Being and Having Been – Choreographer: Alastair Marriott
- Castle Nowhere – Choreographer: Matjash Mrozewski
- Children of Adam – Choreographer: Alastair Marriott
- Continued – Choreographer: Alastair Marriott
- Frozen – Choreographer: Vanessa Fenton
- Homage to the Queen – Fire – Choreographer: Christopher Wheeldon
- Knots – Choreographer: Vanessa Fenton
- Le Baiser de la Fée – The Fairy's Kiss – Choreographer: Michael Corder
- On Public Display – Choreographer: Vanessa Fenton
- Siren Song – Choreographer: Poppy Ben-David

== Repertoire ==
=== Royal Ballet ===
- A Month in the Country – Vera – Choreographer: Sir Frederick Ashton
- La Bayadère – 3rd Solo Shade – Production: Natalia Makarova
- Cinderella – Spring Fairy – Production: Sir Frederick Ashton
- La Fin du Jour – Cerise Couple – Choreographer: Sir Kenneth MacMillan
- Giselle – Moyna – Production: Sir Peter Wright
- Gloria – The Girl – Choreographer: Sir Kenneth MacMillan
- Mayerling – Princess Stephanie and Princess Louise – Choreographer: Sir Kenneth MacMillan
- The Nutcracker – Clara – Choreographer: Sir Peter Wright
- Les Rendezvous – Pas de Trois – Choreographer: Sir Frederick Ashton
- Scenes de Ballet – Spring Fairy – Choreographer: Sir Frederick Ashton
- Sinfonietta – Choreographer: Jirí Kylián
- The Sleeping Beauty – Various Roles – Production: Dame Monica Mason and Christopher Newton
- The Sleeping Beauty – Various Roles – Production: Natalia Makarova
- Swan Lake – Pas de Trois – Production: Sir Anthony Dowell
- La Sylphide – Pas de Deux – Choreographer: August Bournonville
- The Vertiginous Thrill of Exactitude – Choreographer: William Forsythe

=== Birmingham Royal Ballet ===
- Card Game – Two of Diamonds – Choreographer: John Cranko
- Concerto Barocco – Choreographer: George Balanchine
- Coppélia – Prayer – Choreographer: Sir Peter Wright
- Daphnis and Chloë – Chloë – Choreographer: Sir Frederick Ashton
- Giselle – Harvest – Choreography: David Bintley and Galina Samsova
- The Nutcracker – Sugar Plum Fairy & Rose Fairy – Choreographer: Sir Peter Wright
- Paquita – Fourth Solo – Choreographer: Marius Petipa
- The Shakespeare Suite – Juliet – Choreographer: David Bintley
- Swan Lake – Odette/Odile – Choreography: Sir Peter Wright and Galina Samsova
- Take Five – Three to Get Ready – Choreographer: David Bintley

== Awards ==
- 2000 – Genée International Ballet Competition – Royal Academy of Dance – Silver Medal

== Personal life ==
In a 2008 interview with The Guardian, Oughtred said she prefers vintage-style clothing and avoids wearing trainers. The interview mentioned that she often wears ballet pumps outside the studio and chooses practical clothes when touring because of long working days.
