= Momoko Hirata =

Japanese ballerina

Momoko Hirata (平田 桃子, Hirata Momoko; born 1985) is a Japanese principal dancer for the Birmingham Royal Ballet. She attended the Reiko Yamamoto Ballet School before enrolling in the Royal Ballet School in the London, England. She won the 2001 Prix de Lausanne and joined the Birmingham Royal Ballet in 2003. She was promoted to First Artist in 2005, Soloist in 2008, and First Soloist in 2010. She briefly danced with the Barcelona Ballet as a principal dancer in 2012, before returning to the Birmingham Royal Ballet where she was promoted to Principal in 2013.

== Early life and training ==
Born in 1985 in Gunma Prefecture, Japan, Hirata began training in classical ballet at the Reiko Yamamoto Ballet School. She attended the Royal Ballet School and in 2001 she won the Prix de Lausanne. She danced the Princess Aurora variation from The Sleeping Beauty.

== Career ==
In 2003, Hirata joined the Birmingham Royal Ballet. She was promoted to First Artist in 2005 and to Soloist in 2008. In 2010, she was further promoted to First Soloist. In 2011, she joined the Barcelona Ballet before returning to the Birmingham Royal Ballet the following season. She was promoted from First Soloist to Principal in 2013. Judith Mackrell, a critic for The Guardian, has described Hirata as "astoundingly fast and crystal clear in the ballerina role. Every detail of rhythm and style has a bevelled finish so that, even within the most pressured rush of a phrase, each step sings." In her role as The Princess in John Cranko's The Prince of the Pagodas, Mark Monahan from The Telegraph noted that it was "performed with an enchanting grace - first melancholic, then joyful - by the beautiful Japanese-born dancer Momoko Hirata."

Twenty five years on and BRB dancers are still in their element with the speed, panache and precision required by this rollercoaster ride of classicism. None more so than Momoko Hirata who was splendid from first to last in each of the principal ballerina’s fiendishly fast and complex variations. Elegance of line was paramount with her razor sharp outlines undiminished by the rapid speed of execution. Hirata has that rare quality of retaining an air of conservatism – in complete control of the precision of her movement – despite the challenging momentum of the music.

— Graham Watts on Hirata's performance in George Balanchine's Theme and Variations, London Dance

As Juliet in Sir Kenneth MacMillan's Romeo and Juliet her performance was positively received. The Herald noted "Hirata is perfectly cast as Juliet - exquisitely marrying the vulnerability and playfulness of a young Juliet in the nursery scene, with the passionate and ardent sensuality of her later love scenes with Romeo."

Her repertory includes Polyhymnia in Apollo, Agon, Serenade, and Western Symphony by George Balanchine. Lady Elgar in Enigma Variations, Dante Sonata, La fille mal gardée, Scènes de ballet and Les Deux Pigeons by Sir Frederick Ashton. Princess Badr al-Budur in Aladdin, Princess Belle Sakura in The Prince of the Pagodas (2011), Spring in Cinderella, the title role of Sylvia, Titania in The Dream, Carmina Burana, Hobson's Choice, Candy Kane in The Nutcracker Sweeties, Spring and Winter in The Seasons, Beauty and the Beast, Celeritas² in E=mc², Allegri diversi, Les petits riens, and The Sons of Horus by David Bintley. Other repertory includes works by Galina Samsova, Kim Brandstrup, Oliver Hindle, Kit Holder, Millicent Hodson, Kenneth Archer, Garry Stewart, Twyla Tharp, and Sir Peter Wright.
