= Brandon Lawrence =

English ballet dancer (born 1992)

Bradon Lawrence (born 1992 in Bradford, England) is a ballet dancer currently First Soloist (Principal) with Ballet Zürich. Lawrence was previously Principal with the Birmingham Royal Ballet.

== Early years ==
Lawrence trained locally with Penny Murray. After attending the Yorkshire Ballet Seminars, where he caught the attention of Marguerite Porter MBE. Porter arranged an audition for him at the Royal Ballet School's White Lodge where he was accepted at the age of 14. He later went on to study at the Royal Ballet Upper School under the direction of Gailene Stock CBE AM.

== Career ==
On graduating, Lawrence joined Birmingham Royal Ballet in 2011. He was promoted to First Artist, 2014; Soloist, 2016; first Soloist, 2018; and Principal, 2019. Lawrence joined Ballett Zürich for the 2023/24 season as 1.Solist:in (Principal) under the direction of Cathy Marston.

In June 2020, Lawrence launched an online choreography challenge alongside bbodance "to stimulate students' creativity and support their psychological wellbeing during lockdown." In 2021, he graduated from bbodance's Dance Teaching Qualifications program with distinctions and joined the board at Elmhurst Ballet School. Lawrence is a Patron of Voices of British Ballet, New English Ballet Theatre, bbodance and has his own line of dancewear in collaboration with Dansez.

Lawrence co-created GradPro along with Julie Bowers in 2022 as a platform for young graduates to be seen by companies and directors and to provide mentoring and coaching.

Lawrence co-hosts Open Barre Podcast alongside Julia Dixon.

== Repertoire ==
Carlos Acosta: Don Quixote (Basilio, Espada)
Frederick Ashton: The Dream (Lysander), Les Rendezvous (lead couple), La Fille mal gardée (Colas)
George Balanchine: Apollo, Serenade, Slaughter on tenth avenue
David Bintley: Cinderella (Prince), The Prince of the Pagodas (King of the South), Beauty and the Beast (Beast), Far from the Madding Crowd (Tumbler), Carmina Burana (Third Seminarian), The King Dances (La Grâce), Faster (Thrower), Aladdin ('Emerald', 'Gold'), 'Still Life' at the Penguin Café (Southern Cape Zebra, 'Now Nothing'), Flowers of the Forest, E=mc², Tombeaux, The Shakespeare Suite (Othello) and David Bintley and Galina Samsova's production of Giselle (Albrecht), Hobsons Choice (Salvation Army), The Tempest (Caliban)
Edward Clug: Radio and Juliet
Michael Corder: Le Baiser de la fee
John Cranko: Pineapple Poll (Crew) and Card Game (Five of Hearts), The Taming of the Shrew (Lucentio)
Jiri Kylian: Forgotten Land (White Couple)
Jessica Lang: Lyric Pieces, Wink
José Limón:The Moor's Pavane (Othello)
Kenneth MacMillan: Pavane, La Fin du jour and Elite Syncopations ('Friday Night', 'Bethena Concert Waltz'),
Romeo and Juliet (Romeo), Concerto (Second movement)
Cathy Marston: Atonement, the Cellist
Vincente Nebrada: Our Waltzes (Brown Couple)
Juliano Nunes: Interlinked
Valery Panov: Liebestod
Uwe Scholz: The Seventh Symphony (1st and 4th movement Principal couple)
Twyla Tharp: In the Upper Room
Will Tuckett: Lazuli Sky (Principal Couple)
Ninette de Valois: Checkmate (Black Castle)
Didy Veldman: Sense of Time
Alexander Whitley: Kin.
Sir Peter Wright's production of The Nutcracker (The Prince) Coppélia (Franz) and The Sleeping Beauty (Prince Florimund), and Peter Wright and Galina Samsova's production of Swan Lake (Prince Seigfreid).

== Created roles ==
Lawrence created Robbie in Cathy Marston's Atonement, the principal role in George Williamson's Embrace, Pan in Ruth Brill's Arcadia, La Grâce in David Bintley's The King Dances, Alexander Whitley's Kin, Red Couple in Juanjo Arqués's Ignite, and roles in Didy Veldman's Sense of Time, Jessica Lang's Lyric Pieces and Wink, Jack Lister's A Brief Nostalgia, Miguel Altunaga's City of a Thousand Trades and Juliano Nunes's Interlinked.

== Guest performances ==
International Ballet Festival of Miami, 2018; Move It 2018/19 (Headliner on main stage); Guest artist with Cape Town City Ballet (Maina Gielgud's Giselle (Albrecht); Frederick Ashton's Les Patineur (White couple) and Veronica Paeper's Romeo and Juliet (Romeo). Has appeared on the BBC in The King Who Invented Ballet: Louis XIV and the Noble Art of Dance, the CBeebies 'What's in your bag' BBC, Channel 4's Sunday Brunch and Classic FM.

== Awards ==
- National Dance Awards Billy Elliot Award winner 2007;
- National Dance Awards Nominee for Best Male Classical Performance in 2018, 2019 and 2022
- National Dance Awards nominee for Best Male Dancer, Classical in 2019 and 2023
- Royal Academy of Dance Phyllis Bedells Award (2008)
- National Dance Awards Winner for Outstanding Male Classical Performance 2024
