= Scènes de Ballet =

Scènes de ballet may refer to:

== Music ==
- Scènes de ballet (Stravinsky), 1944 ballet music by Igor Stravinsky
- Scène de ballet, Op. 100, music by Charles Auguste de Bériot

== Ballets to the Stravinsky music ==
- The original production choreographed by Anton Dolin
- Scènes de ballet (Ashton), a 1947–1948 ballet by Frederick Ashton
- Scènes de ballet (Taras), a 1972 ballet by John Taras
- Scènes de ballet (Wheeldon), a 1999 ballet by Christopher Wheeldon
