= Olympia London =

Exhibition centre and conference centre in West Kensington, London

Olympia Events
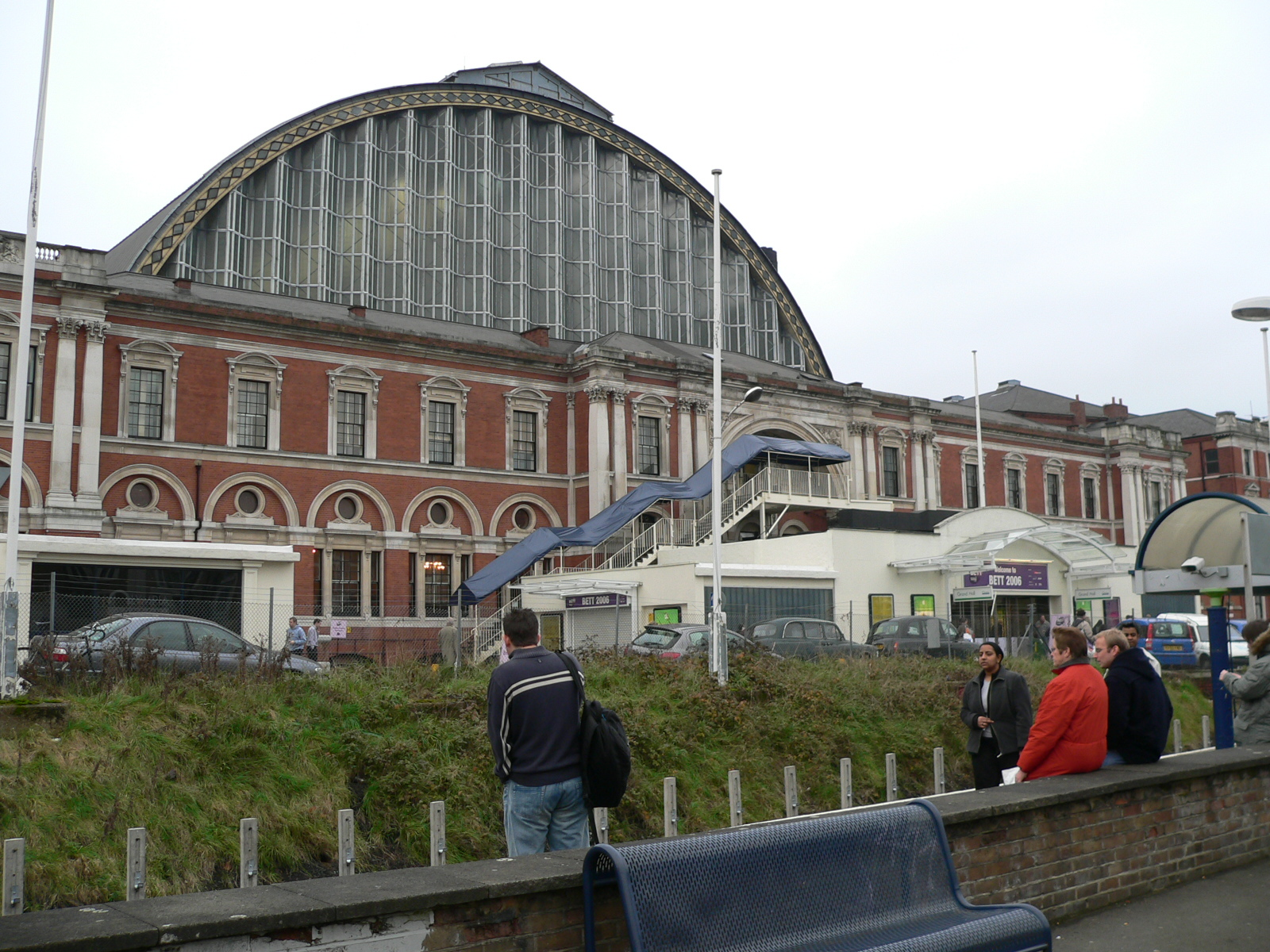
- Exterior of Olympia Grand as seen from Kensington (Olympia) station
- Interactive map of Olympia Events
- Former names: National Agricultural Hall
- Location: West Kensington; London Borough of Hammersmith and Fulham, W14; United Kingdom
- Coordinates: 51°29′47″N 0°12′35″W
- Owner: Consortium including Yoo Capital, Deutsche Finance Group, Bayerische Versorgunskammer and Versicherungskammer Bayern Group
- Capacity: 4,000–10,000
- Public transit: Kensington (Olympia)

Construction
- Opened: 26 December 1886; 139 years ago
- Renovated: 2013
- Expanded: 1923; 1929; 1987; 2011
- Architects: Henry Edward Coe; Holman and Goodrham; Joseph Emberton

Website
- olympia.london

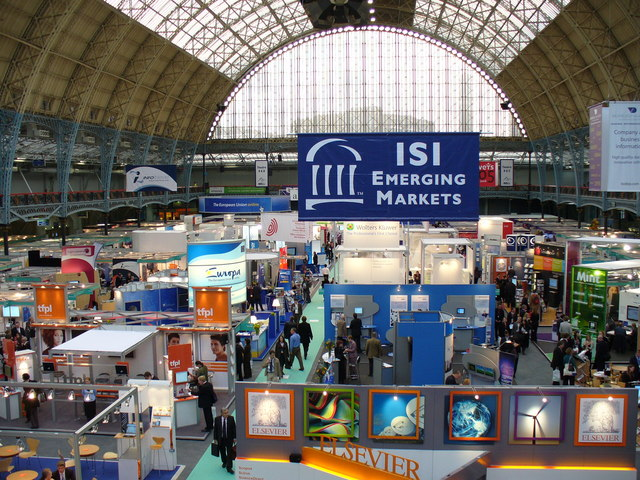
The interior of Olympia, hosting a trade fair

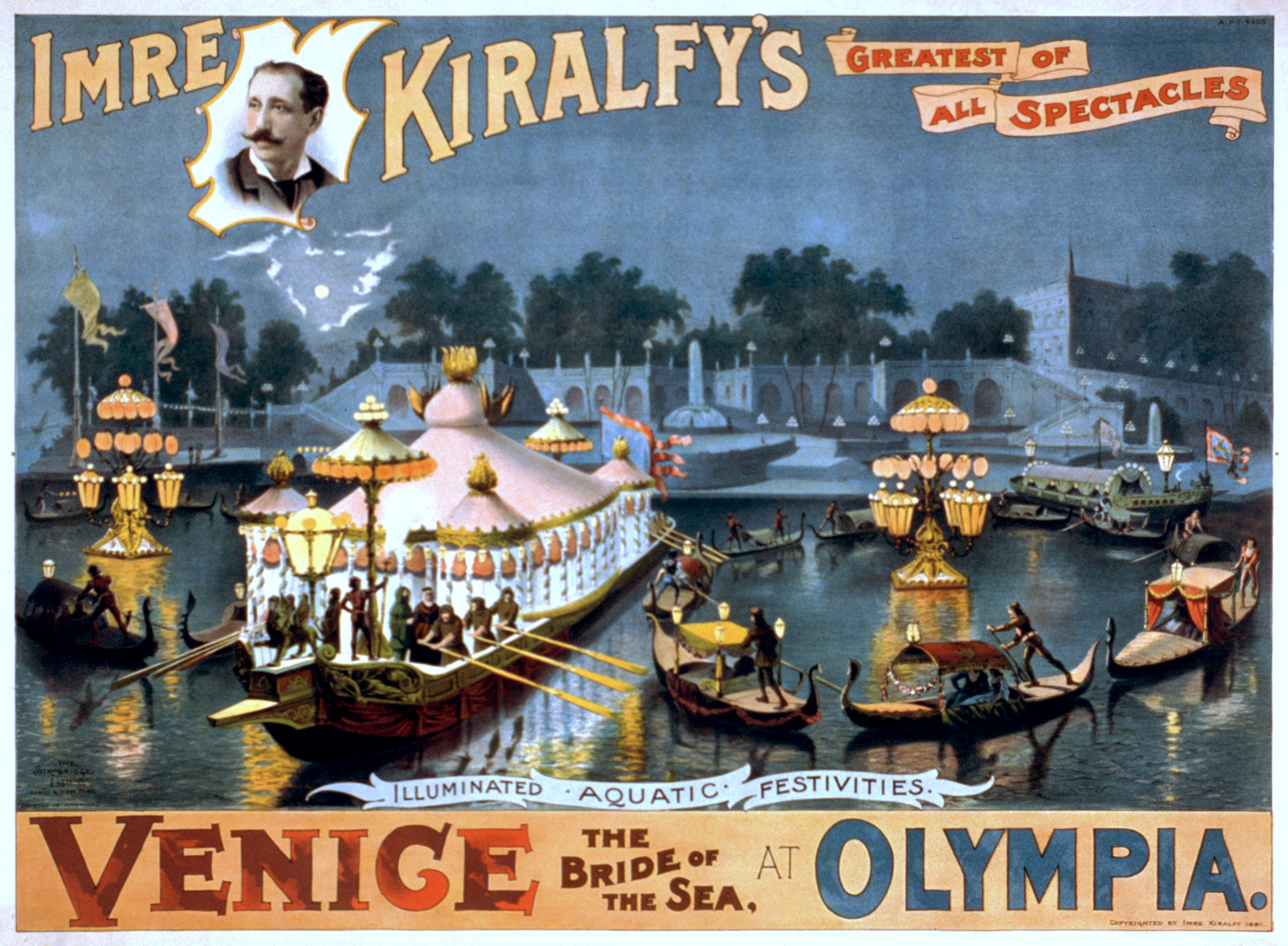
Imre Kiralfy's Venice the bride of the sea, performance poster

Olympia Events, formerly known as Olympia London and sometimes referred to as the Olympia Exhibition Centre, is a dedicated exhibition centre, event space and conference centre in West Kensington, in the London Borough of Hammersmith and Fulham, London, England. A range of international trade and consumer exhibitions, conferences and sporting events were staged there. It was redeveloped, preserving the buildings' listed exteriors, at a cost of £1.3 billion to include a smaller events venue, restaurants and hotels, office space, conference centre, gym, theatre, and secondary school.

Access to the site has long been provided by Kensington (Olympia) station, which is on both the London Overground railway and the London Underground.

== Buildings ==
The buildings of London Olympia are:

- The Grand Hall, the former National Agricultural Hall.
- The Pillar Hall, the former Minor Hall, both of 1885 in Italianate style by Henry Edward Coe with James Edmeston and engineers Arthur T Walmisley and Max Am Ende. The ironwork of the roof is by Handyside of Derby.
- Olympia National (the former National Hall), an annexe of 1923 by architects Holman and Goodrham.
- Olympia Central (built as the Empire Hall) of 1929, by architect Joseph Emberton. Olympia Central, with its large Olympia signage integral to the building's exterior, is very well known as it fronts onto a public road, Hammersmith Road. The others building were primarily accessed via a small access road which also serves Olympia Tube Station.

In 2003, The Grand Hall and the Pillar Hall of 1885, designed by Coe and Edmeston, were given historic status, listed at Grade II* for their historic interest and their architectural value. The distinctive façade of Olympia Central, a large concrete building in the Moderne architectural style was listed, but the building as a whole was not listed due to many changes made through the 20th century.

== History ==
Olympia was originally conceived in the early 1880s as the National Agricultural Hall, a larger version of the Royal Agricultural Hall (1861–62, Grade II) in Islington. The project of building a National Agricultural Hall was conceived by Edwyn Sherard Burnaby (1830-1883), MP for Leicestershire North, who primarily wanted to see shows such as the military Royal Tournament, held at the Royal Agricultural Hall in Islington since 1880, staged on a much larger scale and made more easily accessible by railway from across London and the rest of the country.

The site chosen was a former market garden in West Kensington, immediately adjacent to Addison Road station, already a major passenger station on the West London Railway, which became an important method of transport for visitors to Olympia. The building was branded as Olympia even before it opened as its commercial rationale quickly evolved beyond the staging of agricultural or military shows into an open-ended exploitation of what was the largest such venue in England at the time. Intended as a large indoor space for exhibitions, tournaments, sporting competitions and entertainments of various kinds, the building followed in the tradition of large-scale exhibition halls popularised by the Great Exhibition in 1851, the inspiration for various imitators in London, elsewhere in the United Kingdom, and around the world.

The Grand Hall and Pillar Hall were completed in 1885. The National Hall annexe was completed in 1923, and in 1930 the Empire Hall was added.

After World War II, the West London exhibition hall was in single ownership with the larger nearby Earls Court Exhibition Centre. The latter was built in the 1930s as a rival to Olympia.

From 1955 to 1969, Olympia hosted Boys and Girls Exhibition organized by Hulton's children's comics Eagle, Girl, Robin, and Swift; and later by the Daily Mail.

In 2008, ownership of the two venues passed from P&O to Capco Plc which sold it off as a going concern, while Earls Court was being demolished in 2014 as part of an ambitious regeneration scheme to create more luxury housing. In 2012, Olympia celebrated 125 years of events by commissioning British artists Peter Blake, Rob Ryan, Sanna Annukka and Paul Hicks to create their interpretations of the venues.

In January 2013, a £40 million investment was completed and the company re-launched with a new brand; subsequently the business was awarded the Best Marketing Campaign at the Exhibition News Awards 2014.

=== Redevelopment ===
In May 2021, demolition started on the non-listed parts of Olympia Events as part of a comprehensive mixed-use redevelopment of the complex by its owners, while still retaining significant exhibition space. In May 2021, the Olympia Theatre was announced with 1,575 seats, making it the largest new theatre in London since the completion of the National Theatre in 1976. This is in addition to previously announced and consented hotels, rehearsal spaces, cinemas, 4,000 seat music venue, retail, dining and public spaces. In October 2025, The Shubert Organization and Trafalgar Entertainment announced that they would operate the Olympia Theatre.

Canopy along Emberton Way

The redevelopment, with the site remaining open, converted Olympia from a single huge exhibition venue to include a smaller 3,800-capacity music and events venue, half a million square feet of office space, 30 restaurants and bars, two hotels, a conference centre, gym, and a large purpose-built theatre. A new secondary school, Wetherby Pembridge, is in the shell of a former multi-storey car park. The redevelopment cost about £1.3 billion. Access to the old exhibition venue required a ticket; there is now public access to all the amenities via Emberton Walk, a route that goes through the site. The design of the redevelopment was led by Heatherwick Studio and SPPARC.

== Notable events ==
Events that have been held at Olympia include:

- BBC Good Food Show
- Olympia Events International Horse Show
- London Chess Classic
- Pure London
- Spirit of Christmas
- International Art & Antiques Fair
- Marketing Week Live
- Great British Beer Festival
- Salon du Chocolat
- UCAS Design Your Future
- National Wedding Show
- Toy Fair
- The International Motor Exhibition was held annually at Olympia from 1905 to 1936
- Gunboat Smith fought Georges Carpentier 16 July 1914
- The 1st World Scout Jamboree was held at Olympia from 30 July to 8 August 1920
- The Jimi Hendrix Experience on 22 December 1967
- Status Quo played on 31 December 1975
- Procol Harum played on 1 January 1976
- Bad Company played on 2 and 3 January 1977
- Rod Stewart performed on 14 and 15 January 1977
- Eubank v Stretch at the WBO Middleweight title battle, 18 April 1991
- World Championship Wrestling debut UK shows 10-12 December 1991
- The Cure performed on the 26, 27, 28 and 30 November 1992
- Smash Hits Awards held at Olympia Events on 6 December 1992
- Eubank v Holmes at WBO super middleweight class, 20 February 1993
- Fairuz played on 11 and 12 March 1994
- Eubank v Jose Carlos Amaral at the WBO Super-middleweight Championship, 9 July 1994
- Spencer Oliver v Serge Poilblanc at WBO fight, 12 July 1997
- ATP tennis held from 3–6 December 1998
- 3rd Mind Sports Olympiad held 21–30 August 1999
- Miss World 49th Pageant held on 4 December 1999
- Naseem Hamed v Vuyani Bungu at WBO featherweight title battle, 11 March 2000
- MOVE IT annual dance event, first held 2005
- Chemical Brothers played on 30 August 2008
- Vivienne Westwood hosted a catwalk show for London Fashion Week in Olympia Events, 21 February 2009
- Bloc Party played at Olympia Events on 11 and 12 May 2009
- Gavin Rees v Colin Lynes at Prizefighter light-Welterweight battle, 2 December 2009
- Primal Scream performed on 26 and 27 November 2010
- Got to Dance aired from Olympia Events on 29 January 2011
- Darren Barker v Domenico Spada in the WBO European Middleweight title, 30 April 2011
- Doctor Who Experience was held from 1 January to 22 February 2012
- Got to Dance final aired live in March 2012 and 2013
- Hatsune Miku Expo 2018 Europe, the first Hatsune Miku concert in the UK, 8 December 2018
- Olympia Beauty is an annual beauty event which first was held at Olympia in 2004
- RuPaul's DragCon UK, an expo of drag culture was held in January 2020. It was called a "disaster" and a "shambles" by fans after hundreds of ticket holders were left to queue outside for hours.
- Foals played on 29, April 30 April, 1 May and 2 May 2022 as part of their Life Is Yours Tour
- The London Snow Show returned to Olympia in October 2025 after a 15 year absence

== Religious gatherings ==
Olympia Hall was the venue for the Aga Khan's UK Padhramni from 1–7 September 1979. Olympia Hall was transformed to a solemn place of prayer clad in red and green textile and the Imamat crest adorned with fresh flowers.

Olympia Hall was the venue for the Aga Khan's silver jubilee visit to UK on 5 July 1983. The darbar was attended by members of the Imamat family.

== Political gatherings ==
- A mass meeting of Sir Oswald Mosley's British Union of Fascists was held at Olympia on 7 June 1934 which resulted in clashes with their Socialist and Communist opponents and much press comment.
- A European Parliament election rally of Nigel Farage's Brexit Party was held at Olympia on 21 May 2019 despite the owner's objection to their policies.

Preceded by Port Glaud (Seychelles) Mahé Island	Miss World Venue; 1999	Succeeded by Millennium Dome (United Kingdom) London
