= Knapman =

Knapman is an English surname.

== Notable people ==
Notable people with this surname include:

- Ernie Knapman (1898–1982), English rugby player
- Gareth Knapman, English theatre actor and director
- Paul Knapman, English coroner
- Roger Knapman, British politician
- Steve Knapman, Australian television producer
- William Knapman (1830–1908), South Australian hotel owner and brewer
