= Kevin O'Hare =

British retired ballet dancer

Kevin Patrick O'Hare, CBE, (born 14 September 1965) is a British retired ballet dancer and current Director of The Royal Ballet. He succeeded Monica Mason in the role in 2012.

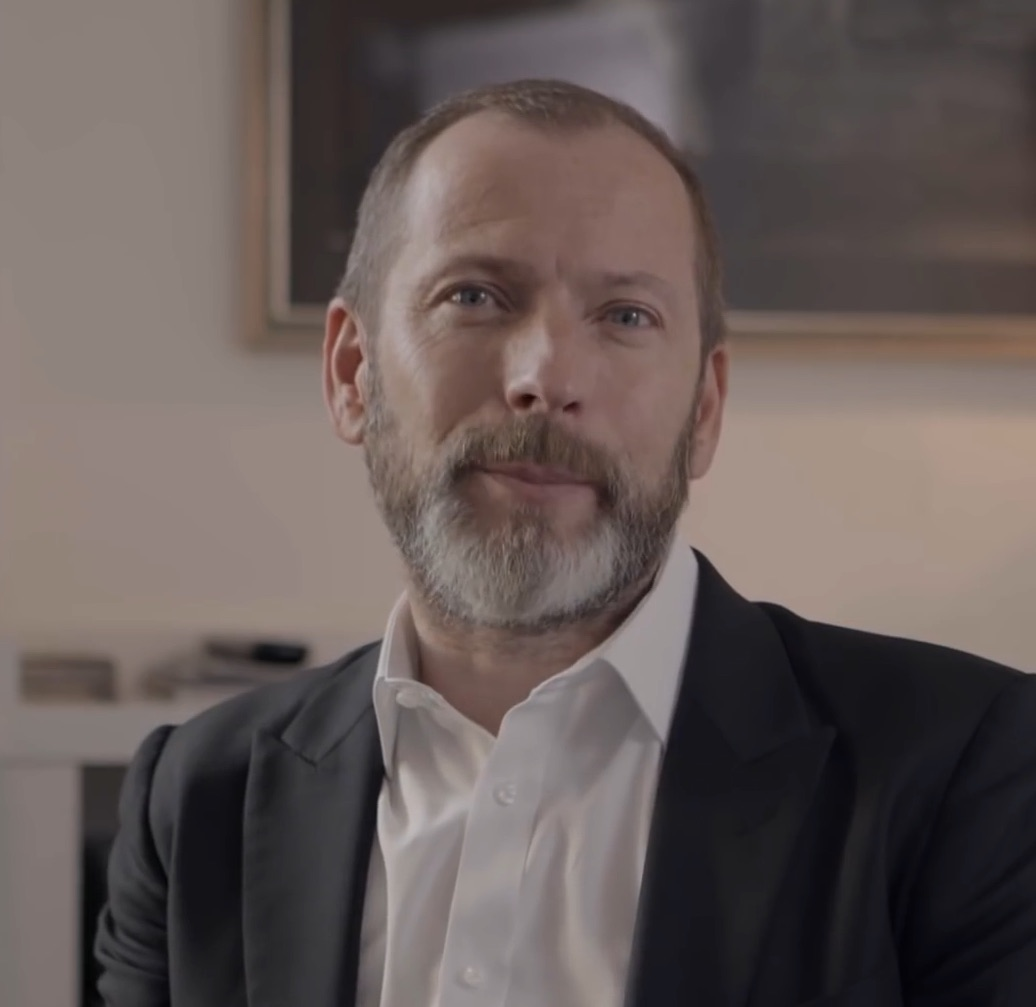
O'Hare in 2016

== Early life ==
O’Hare was born in Kingston upon Hull to Northern Irish parents, Michael and Vera. He trained locally alongside elder siblings Anne and Michael while attending St Charles's RC Primary School and St Thomas More RC School in Hull.

Early engagements include appearing with his brother Michael in Bugsy Malone. Aged 11 he followed Michael to train at the Royal Ballet School. He trained through the School and on an exchange programme with Royal Danish Ballet. He graduated in 1984 and that year danced Prince Florimund from The Sleeping Beauty with fellow graduate Viviana Durante at the School's annual matinee.

== Dance career ==
In 1984 O’Hare graduated into Sadler's Wells Royal Ballet, joining his brother Michael (who is now Ballet Master of the company). He made his first major role debut as Albrecht in his third year with the company and was promoted to principal in 1988, staying with the company as it relocated to Birmingham in 1987 and became Birmingham Royal Ballet in 1990. His repertoire included classical roles, such as Prince Siegfried (Swan Lake), Prince Florimund (The Sleeping Beauty), Albrecht (Giselle) and Romeo (in BRB's first performance of Kenneth MacMillan's Romeo and Juliet). After David Bintley became Artistic Director of the company in 1995, O'Hare created roles in Bintley's ballets Edward II, Far from the Madding Crowd, Carmina Burana and Sylvia.

He retired as a dancer on his 35th birthday.

== Post-dance career ==
O’Hare retired as a dancer in 2000. He trained in company management with the Royal Shakespeare Company for nine months and in 2001 returned to Birmingham Royal Ballet as Company Manager. In 2004 he was appointed Company Manager of The Royal Ballet, and in 2009 became Administrative Director of the company. While Administrative Director, O’Hare oversaw the Royal Ballet's first tour to Cuba in 2009 and supported the company's first performances in the O2. It was announced he would succeed Monica Mason as Director of the company in 2011, a post he took over in July 2012. He served on the Board of Governors of the Royal Ballet School 2000–2009.

On his appointment as director O’Hare announced his intention 'to bring together the most talented artists of the 21st century to collaborate on the same stage – world-class dancers, choreographers, designers and musicians', and his commitment to strengthening ties with Resident Choreographer Wayne McGregor and incumbent Artistic Associate Christopher Wheeldon. In his first season as director O'Hare appointed Liam Scarlett as the company's first artist in residence. In 2013 O'Hare announced his goal of commissioning a new three-act ballet each year. In 2015 he announced new choreography would be the focus on the 2015/16 season, featuring new works from McGregor, Wheeldon, Scarlett, Will Tuckett and Carlos Acosta, and the launching of the Young Choreographers Programme with inaugural member Charlotte Edmonds.

O'Hare was appointed to the board of Dance UK in 2013, and in 2015 was appointed to the board of Northern Ballet.

In 2017 he was a head of the jury at the Prix de Lausanne ballet competition.

O'Hare was appointed a Commander of the Order of the British Empire (CBE) in the 2018 Birthday Honours for services to Dance.
