= Madgwick =

Madgwick is a surname.

Notable people with the surname include:

- Robert Madgwick (1905–1979), Australian educationist
- Rodney Madgwick, Australian judge
- Sandra Madgwick (born 1963), English ballerina
