= Move It (disambiguation) =

"Move It" is a song first released in 1958 by Cliff Richard and the Drifters

Move It may also refer to:

- "Move It", a song by the Chantays from the B-side to their 1963 hit "Pipeline" and their album Pipeline
- "Move It", a song by Chuck Berry from his 1979 album Rockit
- Move It (game show), an Australian TV game show
- MOVE IT, a dance event held annually currently at ExCeL, London
- Move It!, an album by Reel 2 Real
- WarioWare: Move It!, a 2023 video game
- MOVEit, a managed file transfer software service.
