= Vanessa Hooper =

British ballet dancer

Vanessa Hooper, FIDTA, ARAD, is an English retired ballerina and theatre dancer who now works as a dance teacher, freelance choreographer, lecturer and examiner. She is the principal of the Skelton-Hooper School of Dance, which was founded by her mother, Vera Skelton.

== Overview ==
Vanessa Hooper was born and raised in the city of Kingston upon Hull, in the East Riding of Yorkshire, England. As a young child she attended classes at her mother's dance school, the Vera Skelton School of Dance. At 16, she was contracted to The Royal Ballet, a ballet company based at the Royal Opera House in Covent Garden, London. She was later contracted to Northern Ballet Theatre, a ballet and theatrical dance company based in Leeds, West Yorkshire, receiving a salary of just £27.33 despite being one of the company's principal dancers. After the death of her father, she was given leave from the company, but despite her contract being left open, she decided to resign permanently and returned to Hull, becoming a dance teacher working alongside her mother. She later returned to the theatre, making her West End theatre debut in a musical based on the life of Marilyn Monroe.

== Teaching career ==
After retiring from the professional theatre, Hooper returned to Hull, taking over the running of her mother's dance school, which became known as the Skelton Hooper School of Dance. She is a registered teacher of the Royal Academy of Dance (RAD) and the International Dance Teachers Association (IDTA). As a member of the IDTA, she gained Fellowship status in all of the organisations theatre dance branches and was later appointed an examiner. Today, she is a member and former chairman of the IDTA technical committee for ballet. She also represents the organisation throughout the UK as an examiner, lecturer and teacher. Most recently she has become the resident dance expert for the television series Ladette to Lady.

== Notable pupils ==
Hooper has been responsible for the early training of a number of professional dancers, particularly in the field of classical ballet:

- Xander Parish – Graduate of the Royal Ballet School. Former Artist with the Royal Ballet, currently First Soloist with the Mariinsky Ballet (joined 2010)
- Natasha Oughtred – Graduate of the Royal Ballet School. Former Soloist with the Royal Ballet, currently Principal with the Birmingham Royal Ballet (joined 2007)
- Joseph Caley – Graduate of the Royal Ballet School. Currently Principal with the Birmingham Royal Ballet (joined 2005)
- Elizabeth Harrod – Graduate of the Royal Ballet School. Former Artist with the Norwegian National Ballet, currently Soloist with the Royal Ballet (joined 2007)
- Demelza Parish – Graduate of the Royal Ballet School. Currently Artist with the Royal Ballet (joined 2005).
- Joshua McSherry-Gray – Graduate of the Central School of Ballet and the Royal Ballet School. Former Artist with the Royal New Zealand Ballet, currently Artist with the English National Ballet (joined 2009).
- Alice Bayston – Graduate of the English National Ballet School. Currently Artist with Northern Ballet (joined 2014)
- Suzanne Abbott-Lee – Graduate of Laine Theatre Arts. Currently a professional dancer and teacher and arts reporter for BBC Humberside
- Jenny Murphy – Former Artist with Birmingham Royal Ballet, currently Ballet Education Co-ordinator for the company
- Natalie Hewitt – Graduate of the Elmhurst School for Dance and the Central School of Ballet. Currently a professional dancer working internationally

Other pupils of Skelton Hooper School of Dance include:

- Kevin O'Hare – Graduate of the Royal Ballet School. Former Principal with the Birmingham Royal Ballet (retired 2000). Currently Director of the Royal Ballet (since 2012)
- Michael O'Hare – Graduate of the Royal Ballet School. Former Principal with the Birmingham Royal Ballet. Currently Senior Ballet Master with the Birmingham Royal Ballet.

== See also ==
- Birmingham Royal Ballet
- Elmhurst School for Dance
- International Dance Teachers Association
- Northern Ballet Theatre
- Royal Academy of Dance
- The Royal Ballet
- Royal Ballet School
