= Monica Mason =

British ballet dancer and teacher

Dame Monica Mason DBE
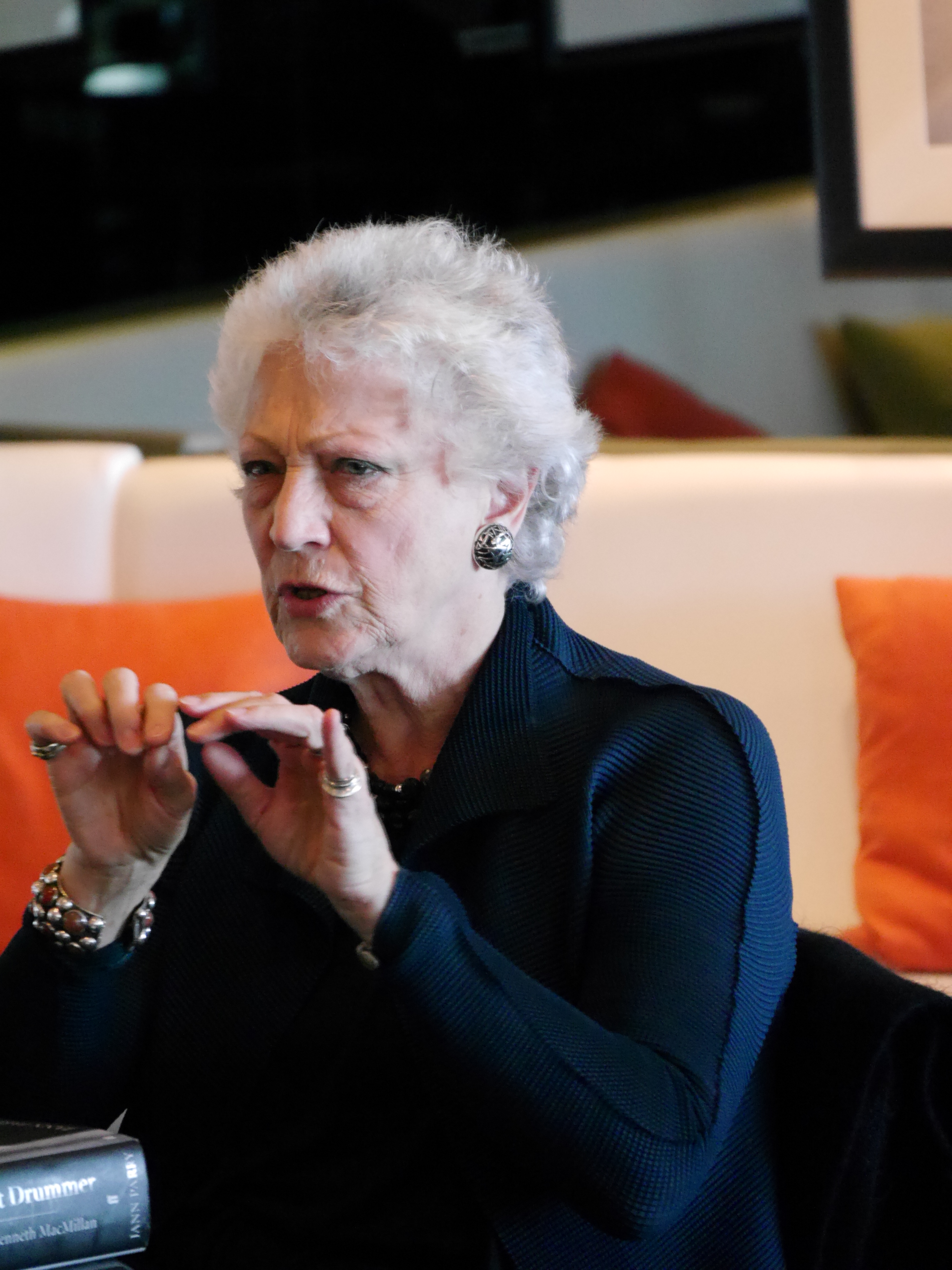
- Monica Mason, 2014
- Born: Monica Margaret Mason; 6 September 1941 (age 84); Johannesburg, South Africa
- Occupations: Ballet dancer and administrator
- Title: Artistic director of The Royal Ballet
- Term: 2002–2012
- Predecessor: Ross Stretton
- Successor: Kevin O'Hare

Dame Monica Margaret Mason DBE (born 6 September 1941) is a former ballet dancer, teacher, and director of The Royal Ballet. In more than a half-century with the company, she established a reputation as a versatile performer, a skilled rehearsal director, and a capable administrator.

== Early life and training ==
Mason was born in Johannesburg, South Africa, into a family of British ancestry. She studied ballet from a young age with Ruth Inglestone, Reina Berman, and Frank Staff in her home city and, later, with Nesta Brooking in London. As an advanced student, she entered the Royal Ballet School in 1956, where she continued her education in both dance and academics.

== Performing career ==
Taken into the corps of the Royal Ballet in 1958, Mason was, at 16, the company's youngest member. She caught the eye of choreographer Kenneth MacMillan, who had been commissioned to create yet another dance version of The Rite of Spring, set to Igor Stravinsky's score that had caused such a ruckus at its premiere with Diaghilev's Ballets Russes in 1913. Impressed, he cast her as the Chosen Maiden, around whom the rite evolves. It was caught on film by Tony Palmer. She scored a marked success and thereafter became a particular favorite of MacMillan. Over the years, she danced in almost all his works in the Royal Ballet repertory, creating roles in six of them.

Besides the Chosen Maiden, they are as follows.

- 1974. Manon, music by Jules Massenet. Role: Lescaut's Mistress.
- 1975. Elite Syncopations, music by Scott Joplin. Role: Calliope Rag.
- 1975. The Four Seasons, music by Giuseppe Verdi. Role: Summer.
- 1975. Rituals, music by Béla Bartók (Sonata for Two Pianos and Percussion). Role: The Midwife.
- 1981. Isadora, music by Richard Rodney Bennett. Role: Nursey.

Appointed a soloist in 1963, Mason was promoted to principal dancer in 1968. The range of roles in her personal repertory was broad, encompassing the classicism of Odette/Odile in Swan Lake and Nikiya in La Bayadère as well as the austerity of purely abstract works such as Song of the Earth, set by MacMillan to Gustav Mahler's meditative Das Lied von der Erde. She was dramatically effective in such disparate roles as the ruthless Black Queen in Checkmate by Ninette de Valois, and the gentle Lady Elgar in Enigma Variations (My Friends Pictured Within), by Frederick Ashton. Coldly implacable as Myrtha in Giselle and furiously malevolent as Carabosse in The Sleeping Beauty. She displayed warmth, charm, and grace in such evocative works as Liebeslieder Walzer by George Balanchine, and Dances at a Gathering by Jerome Robbins.

== Administrative career ==
After many years on the stage of the Royal Opera House, Covent Garden, Mason began a new phase of her career as a ballet mistress and teacher. She was appointed principal répétiteur (rehearsal director) for MacMillan's ballets in 1980, when she also began teaching classical variations to senior girls at the Royal Ballet School. She became the company's principal répétiteur in 1984, assistant to the director in 1988, and assistant director, to Anthony Dowell, in 1991. Capping her administrative career, she was named artistic director in 2002.

After ten years' service, during which she fostered many talents and greatly enriched the repertory, she retired in July 2012. Peter Wright regarded her as the best artistic director since Ninette de Valois.

== Honours and awards ==
Mason has received numerous accolades, awards, and honours for her accomplishments during her long career. She was appointed Officer of the Order of the British Empire (OBE) in 2002 and elevated to the rank of Dame Commander of the Order of the British Empire (DBE) in 2008.
