= Gareth Knapman =

English actor and director (1981–2016)

Gareth Knapman (4 March 1981 – 4 May 2016) was an English theatre actor and director, and a founding director of Ubiquity Theatre Company.

== Career ==
Directly after finishing training at Birmingham (UK)'s Stage2 Theatre Company and getting his LAMDA acting diploma with honours, Knapman jobbed as an actor, director, and workshop leader, mainly in the West Midlands of the UK. Companies he worked for include Gazebo Theatre; Bigfoot Theatre; Loud-Mouth Theatre; Purple Monster; EIL and Geese Theatre Company.

In 2003, Knapman set up Ubiquity Theatre Company with theatre producer Ruth Harrell, which has since become an important and innovative producer of performances and workshop programmes with an aim of 'enabling our audience to question and re-evaluate the social problems they encounter in their everyday lives' (Ubiquity website). Ubiquity's first venue-based performance was a stage adaption of the 1985 Brat Pack film The Breakfast Club in Birmingham's Patrick Centre in the Birmingham Hippodrome. Subsequent performance projects have included re-workings of classic texts such as William Shakespeare's The Tempest; The Importance of Being Earnest by Oscar Wilde and The Dumb Waiter by Harold Pinter along with devised productions including Nomad No More in Leipzig, Germany and Heads Above Feet for Wolverhampton City Council.

Internationally, Knapman and Ubiquity worked from 2002 to 2003 in Vermont, (USA), to direct and produce new pieces of theatre with groups of international actors (with funding from the Experiment In International Living). Knapman took sole control of Ubiquity in August 2004 and took it to Birmingham's partner city of Leipzig, Germany in early 2005, where the group is now permanently based.

His most well known role as an actor was in Angels and Insects in which he was the Tailor's Assistant.

== Sources ==
- https://web.archive.org/web/20080514000235/http://www.stage2.org/
- https://web.archive.org/web/20101203030202/http://www.ubiquitytheatre.de/
- Gareth Knapman at IMDb
