= UBI Theatre Leipzig =

UBI Theatre Leipzig was a bilingual (English and German) theatre company based in Leipzig (Germany). Established in Birmingham (England) in 2002, it moved to Leipzig in 2005 along with its founder Gareth Knapman. In 2012, German theatre educator and actress Claudia Jessat joined the company and the two of them managed the company together until Knapman's passing in early 2016, after which Jessat assumed the role of the owner. The name of the company was then changed from Ubiquity Theatre Company to UBI Theatre Leipzig. UBI seeks to produce socially conscious theatre projects in both performance and in workshop projects with children, youngsters and adults. UBI follows the British tradition of 'Theatre in Education' and 'Community Theatre', and is influenced by Bertolt Brecht, Keith Johnstone and Augusto Boal in its ideals of using theatre for social gain. Projects used to take place in their Leipzig premises and various local theatres.

== Previous productions ==
=== 1984 by George Orwell (2017) ===
Adapted for the stage and directed by Laura Shann

=== Fairy Tale by Claudia Jessat and the UBI youth Ensemble (2017) ===
A piece of devised theatre by Claudia Jessat and the UBI Youth group. A thriller-esque comment on growing up, peer pressure and group dynamics

=== Alice in Wonderland (2017) ===
A modern take on Alice, performed by a young, mostly female cast,

with a twist on the gender roles of some major characters.

=== In the Jungle by Andrea AA. Rassler ===
Set in a home for vulnerable adults, the play focuses on the daily personal and professional challenges of the home's foster-mother Beth and deals with

how the inhabitants are perceived by the local community.

=== Bluebeard / Blaubart by Ludwig Thiek (2016) ===
UBI Youth performed Thiek's version of Charles Perrault's sinister fable.

=== The Birds by Aristophanes (2015) ===
The UBI Performance Group performed this ancient comedy which follows two friends trying to convince earth's birds to build a city in the sky in German.

=== Variations on Being Alone by Gareth Knapman (2015) ===
At the Rumore in Pace Festival in Italy, UBI Youth performed an anthology of original scenes dealing with the events of World War II and the impact it had Europe.

=== Romeo and Juliet by W. Shakespeare (2015) ===
UBI Youth performed the play in English for their contemporaries.

=== Journey's End by R.C. Sherriff (2014) ===
The UBI Performance Group delivered a faithful performance of Sherriff's World War I-retrospective.

=== Skungpoomery / Die Schlündelgründler by Ken Campbell (2014) ===
UBI Youth performed a German translation of Campbell's fast-paced clown play.

=== Die Physiker by F. Dürrenmatt (2014) ===
A cast consisting of both professionals and amateurs performed Dürrenmatts pungent comedy in its original German language.

=== The Tempest by W. Shakespeare (2013) ===
A mixed group of native and non-native speakers performed the play in the original 16th century language. This underlines Knapman's ambition to bridge the gaps between languages.

=== FEEL! (2013) ===
Performed amid passengers in the streets of Leipzig, FEEL! was an attempt at making statistical insights into poverty, abuse and crime palpable through acting.

== Courses ==
The company offered a range of theatre-related courses for educational purposes as well as fun and personal growth.

== Past staff and affiliates ==
Name	Capacity
Claudia Jessat	Owner, Director of German productions & courses
Laura Shann	Director of English productions & courses
Ellen Stobbe	Public relations, social media, props & stagecraft
Jerome Ebeling	Assistant to Jessat & Shann, videographer

== See also ==
Website: http://www.ubi-leipzig.de

Courses: http://www.ubitheatre.com/our-courses/

Facebook: https://www.facebook.com/ubitheatre/

Instagram: https://www.instagram.com/ubi_theatre_leipzig/

== Notes ==
http://www.visionbakery.com/deutschland-england-italien

http://www.leipzig.de/detailansicht-adresse/ubiquity-theatre-company/
