= The Lady and the Fool =

- Choreographer: John Cranko
- Music: Giuseppe Verdi arranged by Sir Charles Mackerras
- Based on: a scenario by John Cranko
- Premiere: 25 February 1954; New Theatre, Oxford
- Original ballet company: Sadler's Wells Ballet
- Setting: Italy
- Genre: Neoclassical ballet

The Lady and the Fool is a ballet, created by choreographer John Cranko with lesser-known operatic music by Giuseppe Verdi arranged by Sir Charles Mackerras. The story concerns the love of a poor clown for a society beauty, who finally rejects her wealthy suitors and chooses a life with the clown.

== Background and productions ==
After the success of Pineapple Poll, Mackerras and Cranko sought a new collaboration, eventually deciding on adapting music by Verdi to a story by Cranko.

The piece was premiered in 1954 at the New Theatre, Oxford, with its London premiere at Sadler’s Wells Theatre on 31 March 1954. The two clowns were played by Kenneth MacMillan and Johaar Mosaval, with Patricia Miller as La capricciosa. The following year the ballet was re-worked by Cranko for Covent Garden, opening on 9 June 1955, dropping one character and reassigning some dances to other characters, allowing the action to be more clearly focussed and the characters more interesting.

The ballet was later produced by the Stuttgart Ballet in 1955, Australian Ballet in 1961, Deutsche Oper, Berlin in 1962, CAPAB Ballet Cape Town and Royal Danish Ballet in 1965 and Houston Ballet in 1971. Performed on tour in Russia by the Royal Ballet, it was well received. The ballet was performed at Covent Garden from 1955-1964, with dancers such as Beryl Grey, Svetlana Beriosova, Philip Chatfield, and Ronald Hynd. It was revived by Sadler’s Wells Ballet from 1965–67, 1972–77, as well as in the 1980s. It was mounted by Ben Stevenson of Houston Ballet in 1978.

The score was recorded in June 1955 at Studio 1 Abbey Road by the Philharmonia Orchestra conducted by Mackerras. A DVD of the ballet broadcast in 1959 with Beriosova, Hynd and Powell as the clowns, and Peter Wright as the Prince, with Mackerras conducting the Royal Opera House Orchestra, was released in 2011 (coupled with Pineapple Poll).

== Original cast ==
- Moondog, a clown - Kenneth MacMillan
- Bootface, a clown - Peter Wright
- La Capricciosa, a beauty
- Signor Midas, a society host
- Capitano Adoncino
- The Prince of Arroganza - David Poole
- An Ambassador of Arroganza
- Two husband hunters

== Synopsis ==
=== Prologue ===
During a prelude the curtain rises on a dark street with couples on their way to a ball (music from Alzira).
A sad theme (Jérusalem) marks the entrance of two poor clowns, Moondog and Bootface who head for an empty bench in the street, where they fall asleep. On her way to the ball and beautifully dressed, La Capricciosa notices the two ragged clowns, wakes them up and asks them to dance for her (Alzira).
The clowns dance a grotesque divertissement; La Capricciosa is delighted by their dance and sweeps them both along with her to the ball.

=== Act 1 ===
In a splendid reception room at the palace of Signor Midas guests arrive (music from Il finto Stanislao and Giovanna d'Arco). Signor Midas greets everyone, welcomes the entrance of the dashing Capitano Adoncino (Il finto Stanislao, Aroldo, Les vêpres siciliennes) and the romantic Prince of Arroganza. The host and his guests are pursued by two debutantes looking for a rich husband, but the men eagerly await the arrival of La Capricciosa. At the height of a tarantella, a fanfare announces her arrival, and she dances a brilliant solo (I due Foscari) and introduces the two clowns, who then perform for the guests, with a scene based on a quarrel over a rose (Il finto Stanislao, Aroldo).

An off-stage band summons the guests to dance, leaving the masked La Capricciosa with her three suitors (Ernani).They at first dance together (I due Foscari) then one by one the men tears a mask from her face – only to reveal another mask underneath; first Midas (Ernani, I masnadieri), then the Prince (I masnadieri, Macbeth, I due Foscari) and finally Adoncino (Macbeth, Attila), but they are rejected, and retire.
Alone, La Capricciosa removes her final mask, and at that moment Moondog enters and falls instantly in love with her (Attila). The off-stage band strikes up again and all re-enter, leading to several dances for Midas (Jérusalem), the Prince (Ernani, I Lombardi alla prima crociata) the husband-hunting debutantes (Il finto Stanislao, Oberto), Adoncino, with a pas de cinq to finish (Jérusalem, Attila).

La Capricciosa enters, soon followed by Moondog (Les vêpres siciliennes) who makes passionate advances to her. She eventually allows her love to overwhelm her and they dance a pas de deux (Aroldo, I masnadieri).
After an ensemble in which Bootface tries to attracts the debutantes (Ernani, I Lombardi alla prima crociata, Les vêpres siciliennes), La Capricciosa enters. Despite the pleas of her three suitors, she points out Moondog, and they embrace to the horror of the guests who leave the room (Aroldo, Luisa Miller). La Capricciosa helps Moondog to his feet and they slowly go off, leaving a disconsolate Bootface; but they return and take him with them (Ernani, Aroldo).

=== Epilogue ===
In the final scene, back in the street, all three curl up to sleep on the bench (Jérusalem, Aroldo).
