= Will Tuckett =

English director and choreographer

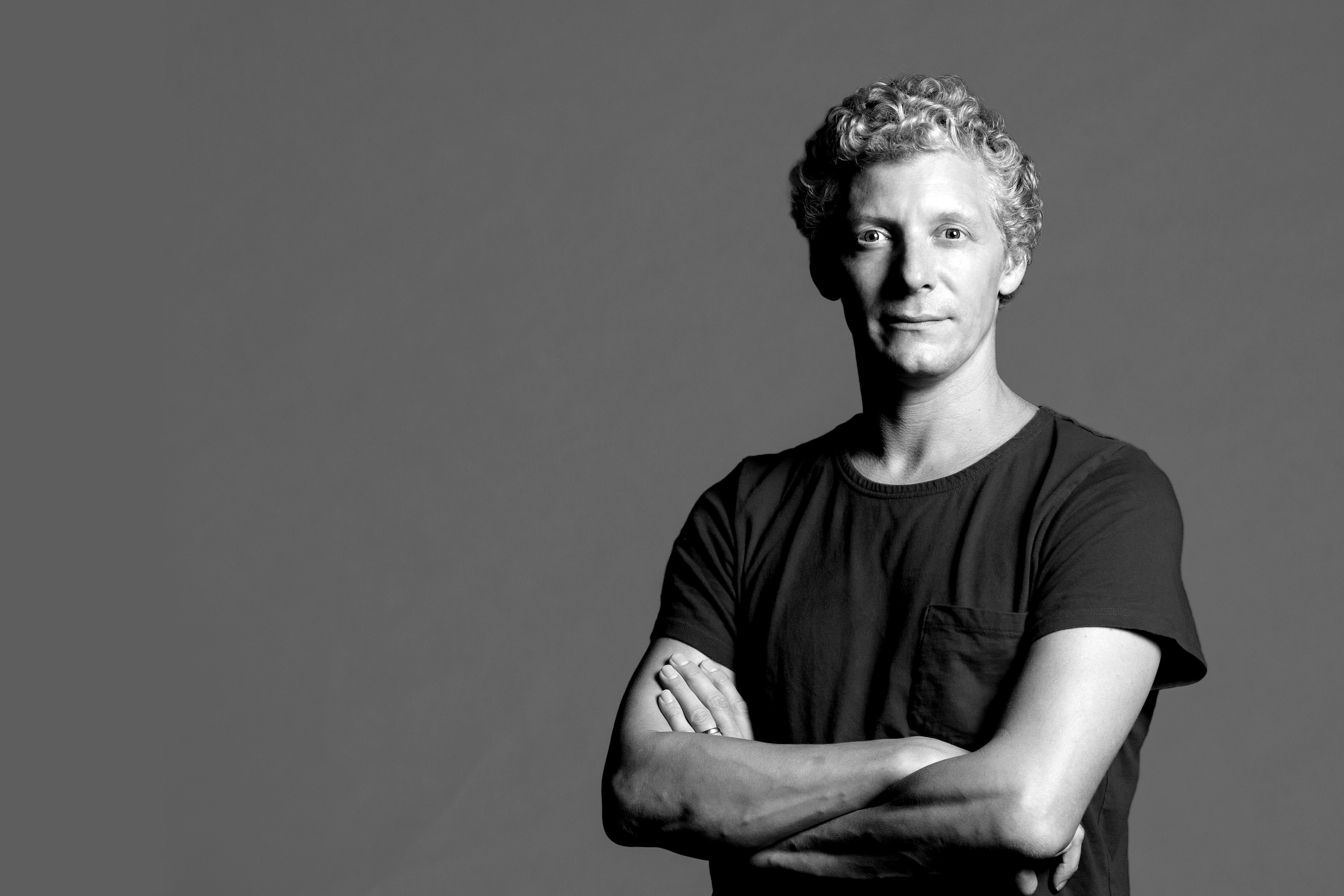
- Born: 1969 (age 56–57); Birmingham, England
- Occupation: Ballet choreographer

Will Tuckett (born 1969) is an English director and choreographer, who has created works for many international companies including the Royal Ballet, The National Ballet of Canada, and English National Ballet.

== Early life ==
Tuckett was born in Birmingham in 1969.

He trained at the Royal Ballet School.

== Awards (partial) ==
Tuckett won the 2014 Laurence Olivier Award for Best Entertainment for The Wind in the Willows.

The Varna International Competition Award for Best Choreography for Nisi Dominus 2006.

His dance film NELA for Royal Ballet Principal Marianela Nunez directed by Andy Margetson won the Audience Choice Award SANS FESTIVAL OF DANCE CINEMA 2019 and the Overall Festival Award at the FLATLANDS DANCE FILM FESTIVAL 2019.

He was nominated for The Critics Circle Award for Best Choreography in 2003 for the ROH production of The Wind in the Willows and in 2007 for the English National Ballet production of The Canterville Ghost

His production Lazuli Sky for Birmingham Royal Ballet was nominated for the 2021 Critics Circle National Dance Award for Best Choreography and the South Bank Dance Award

His production Then or Now for Ballet Black was nominated for the 2022 UK Theatre Award for Outstanding Achievement in Dance and the South Bank Dance Award

== Career (partial) ==
Tuckett has choreographed for the Royal Ballet, the English National Ballet, the National Ballet of Canada, Ballet Black, National Ballet of China, K Ballet in Japan, Sarasota Ballet, American Ballet Theatre, Studio Company, Texas Ballet Theater in the United States, BalletBoyz, Rambert Dance Company.

He created a series of works for new and family audiences at The Royal Opera House / ROH2, and was made the first Creative Associate for the Opera House in 2006.

He has worked as Creative Director on large scale commercial events for Van Cleef & Arpels / The Royal Opera House, creating events in such diverse locations as Tate Tanks, Buckingham Palace and Clarence House and created an immersive experience for The Royal Opera House front of house spaces.

- He has choreographed as part of theatre productions at the RSC, Shakespeare's Globe, the TEAM and the Almeida Theatre
- He has choreographed as part of opera productions for the Royal Opera, Opera North, Grange Park Opera, the Bregenz Festival
- He has directed opera / musical theatre for Garsington Opera, Iford Arts Festival, Sage Gateshead, the Royal Opera House, Opera North, DECCA Records
- He has directed theatre for the Almeida Theatre, Brighton Festival, Minor Entertainment, Akasaka ACT Theatre, PARCO Theatre Tokyo

The new PARCO Theatre in Shibuya opened in 2020 with his production of Peter Shaffer's Royal Hunt of The Sun, starring Ken Watanabe and Hio Miyazawa.

He created Lazuli Sky for Birmingham Royal Ballet which was the first new work to open at Birmingham Repertory Theatre and Sadlers Wells Theatre during the Covid lockdown at the end of 2020.

He was asked to create new Covid safe sequences for The Royal Ballet's classic production of The Nutcracker by Sir Peter Wright which opened at The Royal Opera House, Christmas 2020

His production of In the Night Garden Live has been touring for 12 years and has now been seen by over a million people.

He has directed and co-directed work for the BBC, Sky Arts, Channel 4, Wow Wow Television, Japan and choreographed for feature films from Vertigo Films, BBC Films, Working Title and The Royal Opera House.

He has created movement for various feature films and television shows and his work has been featured in several documentary series, most recently Alan Yentob's IMAGINE for the BBC.

In 2006, he devised the series Ballet Hoo: Ballet Changed My Life for Channel 4. https://www.brb.org.uk/post/ballet-changed-my-life-ballet-hoo

He was the Clore Dance Fellow 2008.

He is represented by United Agents.

== Productions (partial) ==
- Love's Fool for the Royal Ballet Dance Bites (1999)
- Seven Deadly Sins for the Royal Ballet (2007)
- Marianne Dreams for the Almeida Theatre, London (2007)
- The Wind in the Willows for the Royal Opera House ROH2
- The Thief of Baghdad for the Royal Opera House ROH2 (2008)
- Faeries for the Royal Opera House ROH2 (2010 / 2011)
- Pleasure’s Progress for the Royal Opera House ROH2 (2010)
- The Soldier's Tale for the Royal Opera House ROH2 (2009 / 2011 / 2013 / 2015)
- The Turn of the Screw for the Royal Ballet
- The Canterville Ghost for English National Ballet
- Diana and Actaeon / Metamorphosis for the Royal Ballet (2012)
- West Side Story for the Sage Gateshead / RSC (2012)
- Elizabeth for the Royal Ballet (2013 / 2015 / 2018)
- Changing Light for The Sarasota Ballet (2013 / 2017)
- Lux Aeterna for The Sarasota Ballet (2014 / 2014)
- The Secret Garden for The Sarasota Ballet (2014 / 2017)
- Pinocchio for National Ballet of Canada (2017), Texas Ballet Theater (2018)
- Every Good Boy Deserves Favour for Akasaka ACT Theater, Tokyo (2019)
- Royal Hunt of the Sun for Parco Theatre, Tokyo (2020)
- Lazuli Sky for Birmingham Royal Ballet (2020)
- In The Night Garden Stage Show (UK Wide) (2022)
