= Samara Downs =

British ballerina

- Born: Ashford, Kent, England
- Education: Royal Ballet School
- Occupation: Ballet dancer

Samara Downs is a British ballerina, and a principal dancer with the Birmingham Royal Ballet.

Samara Downs was born in Ashford, Kent. She trained at the Caroline Shaw and Pauline Kellett Dance Schools, and the Royal Ballet School.

Downs joined the Birmingham Royal Ballet in 2003, and has been a principal since 2016.

In 2018, Downs danced both lead roles, Princess Aurora and the evil fairy Carabosse, in The Sleeping Beauty.
