= Sandra Madgwick =

English ballerina

Sandra Madgwick Crossley
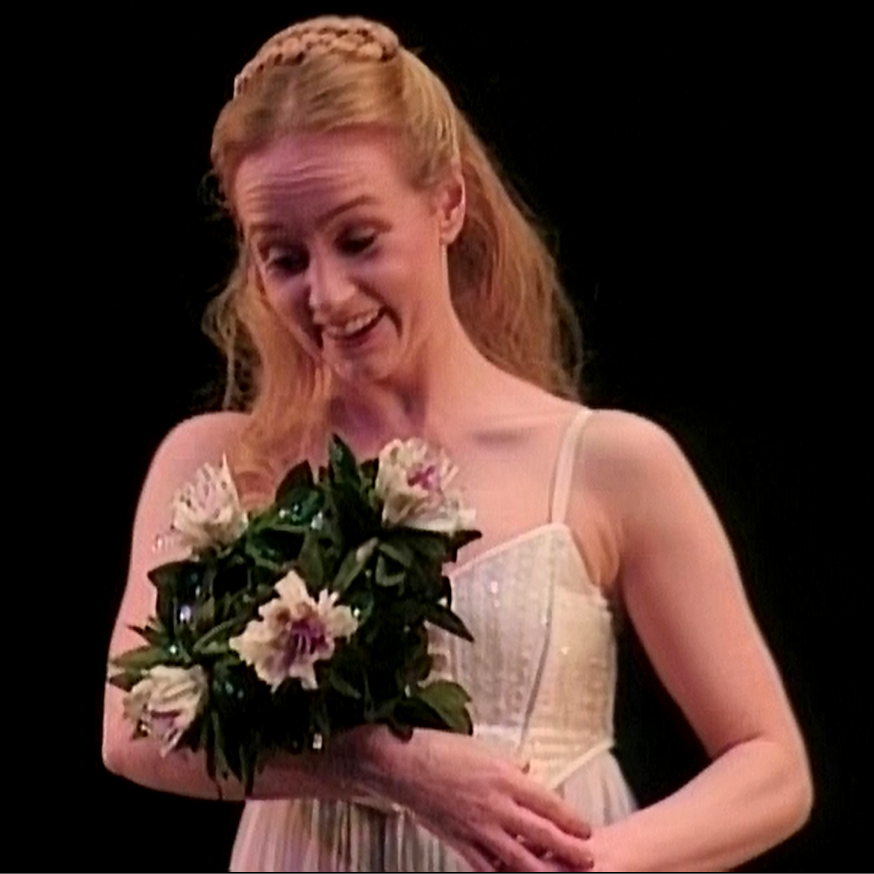
- as Clara in The Nutcracker (Birmingham Royal Ballet, 1994)
- Born: 7 March 1963 (age 62); Taplow, England

Sandra Elizabeth Madgwick (born 7 March 1963 in Taplow, Buckinghamshire) is a retired English ballerina and former principal dancer at the Birmingham Royal Ballet, where she worked for 19 years. She initially trained at the Royal Ballet School and took over extensive roles both at the Birmingham Royal Ballet and at the Royal Opera House, Covent Garden appearing in works such as The Nutcracker, The Two Pigeons, Coppélia, Les Patineurs, and Carmina Burana. She is well known for the role of Clara in the recorded and live-aired performance of 'The Nutcracker' in 1994. Her other recorded works include the studio-recorded performance of Hobson's Choice (1992), in which she starred as Hobson's daughter Vicky, and Royal Opera House performance of Coppélia (1995) in which starred as Swanhilda. She holds a master's degree in Dance in Education and the Community and is currently ballet tutor at Performers College and Dance East. She is married and has three sons.
