= Rockey Sun Keting =

Composer

Sun Keting
- Born: 1993 (age 32–33); China
- Occupations: Composer, creative director, researcher
- Known for: Contemporary classical composition and interdisciplinary collaboration
- Awards: Composer for the Britten-Pears Young Artist
- Website: ketingsun.com

Sun Keting (Chinese: 孙柯亭; also known as Rockey Sun Keting) is a composer, sound artist, and artistic director originally from China and currently based in London. Her work spans various fields, including concert music, theater, dance, and interdisciplinary performance. Keting's practice focuses on narrative-driven and movement-informed approaches, where sound serves as a key component in the structure of storytelling.

== Early life and education ==
Sun Keting obtained a Bachelor of Arts degree from the Shanghai Conservatory of Music before relocating to the United Kingdom. In the UK, she completed a Master's degree and a Doctorate in Composition at the Royal Academy of Music in London. Her research focused on the influence of Taoism, Zen Buddhism, and embodiment on contemporary composition.

== Career ==
Sun Keting's music has been performed in various international venues, and she has composed works for ensembles including the London Symphony Orchestra, London Philharmonic Orchestra, London Sinfonietta, BBC Singers, Birmingham Royal Ballet, and the National Youth Choir of Great Britain. Her work has been presented at various venues and festivals, including the Royal Festival Hall, Wigmore Hall, King's Place in London, Aldeburgh Festival, Cheltenham Festival, LSO St. Luke's, Britten Pears Arts, Tête-à-Tête Festival, and the National Concert Hall in Dublin.

In 2023, Keting contributed as one of the composers for "Black Sabbath: The Ballet," produced by the Birmingham Royal Ballet in 2023. Additionally, she co-created "Bound/Unbound," a music-dance theatre piece in collaboration with composer Alex Ho for the collective Tangram and the London Symphony Orchestra.

Keting's works include "that which is unseen..." for the London Philharmonic Orchestra, the dance piece "Ensō" and Now I Will DO Nothing but Listen for the London Symphony Orchestra, as well as collaborations with Lico Kehua Li on "Conduit" and "BLUESHIFT | Infinite Cycle." In 2025, the London Sinfonietta performed "Conduit," which she directed and composed at the Southbank Centre. Keting was designated as a Royal Philharmonic Society Composer for the 2023-24 season, during which she premiered a new work as part of the Society's Composer Programme. The commissioned piece was reviewed in Music Opinions Magazine, which described it as a synthesis of Eastern and Western sonorities and commented on her transnational musical style.

== Selected works ==
- Steppe - flute, clarinet, violin, cello, and piano (2018)
- Bound/Unbound - music theatre, with Alex Ho / Tangra, (2023)
- that which is unseen... - orchestral, London Philharmonic Orchestra (2021)
- Conduit - dance music collaboration, London Sinfonietta (2024)
- BLUESHIFT | Infinite Cycle - dance theatre, Shanghai International Dance Centre (2024)
- Black Sabbath: The Ballet - Birmingham Royal Ballet (2023)
- Mang Gu and thronged only with flowers - choral works, NMC Records (2023)

== Awards ==
- Britten-Pears Young Artist Award, Composer
