= Royal Ballet School =

Classical ballet training facility in London

- Floral Street, Covent Garden; White Lodge, Richmond Park; London; England

Information
- Type: Private school
- Motto: "Strength and Grace"
- Established: 1926; 100 years ago
- Founder: Dame Ninette de Valois
- Department for Education URN: 102947 Tables
- Artistic Director: Iain Mackay
- Gender: Mixed
- Age: 11 to 19
- Enrolment: 221 as of April 2022
- Publication: Encore
- Affiliations: The Royal Ballet and Birmingham Royal Ballet
- Advisory Council: Carlos Acosta; David Bintley; Dame Darcey Bussell; Sir Anthony Dowell; Kevin O'Hare; Dame Antoinette Sibley; Sir Peter Wright
- Website: royalballetschool.org.uk

The Royal Ballet School is a British school of classical ballet training founded in 1926 by the Anglo-Irish ballerina and choreographer Ninette de Valois. The school's aim is to train and educate outstanding classical ballet dancers, especially for the Royal Ballet (based at the Royal Opera House in London) and the Birmingham Royal Ballet.

Admission to the school is based purely on dancing talent and potential, regardless of academic ability or personal circumstances, and 90% of current students rely on financial support to attend the school. The school is based at two sites, White Lodge, Richmond Park (for students aged 11–16) and Covent Garden (for students from 16 to 19 years old) based in purpose-built studios on Floral Street, adjacent to the Royal Opera House.

The Royal Ballet School has produced dancers and choreographers of international renown, including Dame Margot Fonteyn, Dame Beryl Grey, Sir Kenneth MacMillan, Dame Darcey Bussell, Alessandra Ferri, Viviana Durante, and Sergei Polunin, as well as the current director of The Royal Ballet, Kevin O'Hare. Graduates of the school have also achieved employment in musical theatre, contemporary and jazz dance, television and film.

== History ==
In 1926, the Irish-born dancer Ninette de Valois founded the Academy of Choreographic Art, a dance school for girls and the predecessor of today's Royal Ballet School. Her intention was to form a repertory ballet company and school, leading her to collaborate with theatrical producer and theatre owner Lilian Baylis.

Baylis owned the Old Vic theatre and acquired Sadler's Wells theatre in 1925. In 1928, she engaged de Valois to stage dance performances at both theatres and she re-opened Sadler's Wells theatre in 1931, with de Valois' school moving into studios on the site as the Sadler's Wells Ballet School, teaching both boys and girls. At the same time, the Vic-Wells Ballet Company was formed using students of the school and other notable dancers of the era. Both the school and the ballet company developed quickly and after ballet performances ceased at the Old Vic, the ballet company was renamed the Sadler's Wells Ballet.

In 1946, the company moved to become the resident ballet company at the newly re-opened Royal Opera House in Covent Garden and as a result, in 1947 the school moved from Sadler's Wells to premises in Barons Court, with academic education being introduced for younger students.

Following rapid expansion, in 1955 the school secured the premises at White Lodge in Richmond Park, London. This was established at the time as the Royal Ballet 'Lower School', a residential boarding school for children aged 11–16, combining general education and vocational ballet training. The Royal Ballet School 'Upper School' was established at the school's existing premises in Barons Court with students studying ballet on a full-time basis between the ages of 16–19.

In October 1956, a Royal Charter was granted officially linking the ballet company and school and they became The Royal Ballet School and Royal Ballet Company. A second smaller company still performed at Sadler's Wells and toured around the UK and this became the Sadler's Wells Royal Ballet. de Valois retired as Director in 1970.

In 1990, the Sadler's Wells company moved to become the resident ballet company at the Birmingham Hippodrome, in Birmingham, where it was renamed Birmingham Royal Ballet.

In January 2003, The Royal Ballet School's older students (aged 16–19) moved to a newly constructed studio complex in Floral Street, adjacent to the Royal Opera House in Covent Garden, where The Royal Ballet remains the resident ballet company. A bridge was constructed between the school and the Opera House, linking the school with the theatre and The Royal Ballet Company's own studios. The designer of the bridge received an architectural award and it is known as the Bridge of Aspiration.

== White Lodge ==
The Royal Ballet School's younger students moved to White Lodge, Richmond Park in Richmond, London in 1955 when the school was split for the first time. The Georgian building is a former royal residence and hunting lodge built during the reign of King George II. It is the school's permanent premises and there has been extensive redevelopment of the site to provide dance and academic facilities and accommodation for students.

Children attend the school between the ages of 11-16 and entry to the school is by audition only. The school receives over twenty thousand applications every year and holds auditions in major UK cities. Having an international reputation, the school also receives applications from other countries. As a boarding school, the majority of students live on site, although there are a small number of day-students.

In dance, students study classical ballet, character dance, contemporary, gymnastics, Irish, Morris and Scottish dancing. Later in their training, students study ballet repertoire, solos and pas de deux and boys undertake upper body conditioning. The school offers academic study at the level of a typical secondary school, both at Key Stage 3 and Key Stage 4, with all students sitting GCSE examinations.

== Covent Garden ==
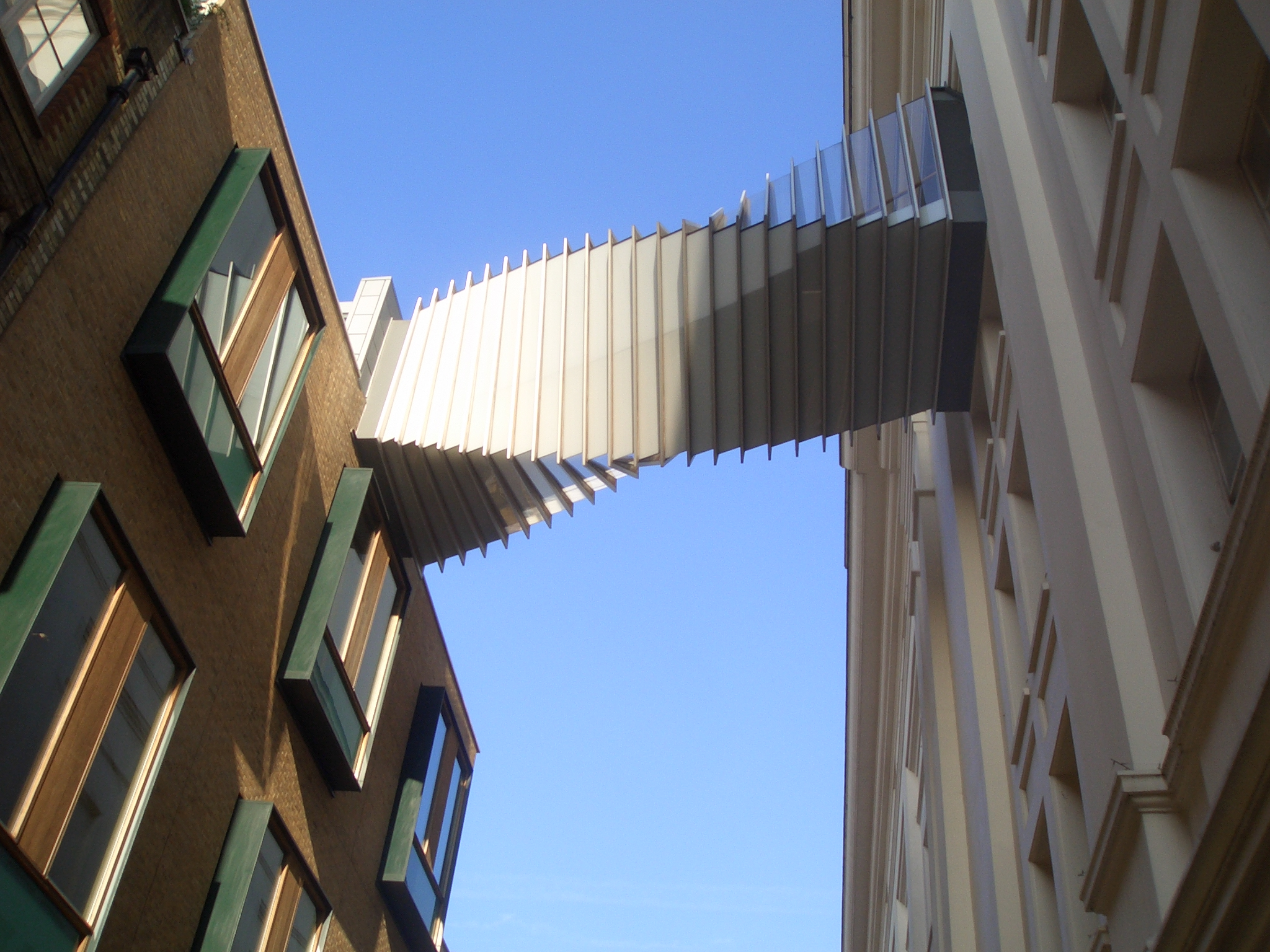
Bridge of Aspiration linking the Royal Ballet Upper School on the left with the Royal Opera House, designed by Flint & Neill and Buro Happold with WilkinsonEyre

The Royal Ballet School's Covent Garden base was established in 1955, when the younger students were moved to White Lodge. The school remained at existing studios in Barons Court, London, with academic studies introduced for the first time. Later in 2003, the school relocated to new premises, and the former Barons Court site now houses the London Academy of Music and Dramatic Art.

The school relocated to new, purpose-built premises in Covent Garden in January 2003. The complex is a four-storey building with six dance studios, including a studio theatre with retractable raked seating for an audience of 200. The building also houses changing rooms and showers for male and female students, a gym and fitness room, a pilates studio, physiotherapy suite and students common room. Facilities for academic education include four classrooms, a library with computer equipment, an art studio and audiovisual suite. All the dance studios are linked to the audiovisual suite so that classes and rehearsals can be filmed as a training tool, enabling the dancers to analyse themselves.

Alongside a timetable of intensive ballet training, students also study pas de deux, solos, repertoire, character, contemporary dance, stagecraft, make-up, and body conditioning. 3rd year students get many opportunities throughout the year to train with The Royal Ballet and Birmingham Royal Ballet.

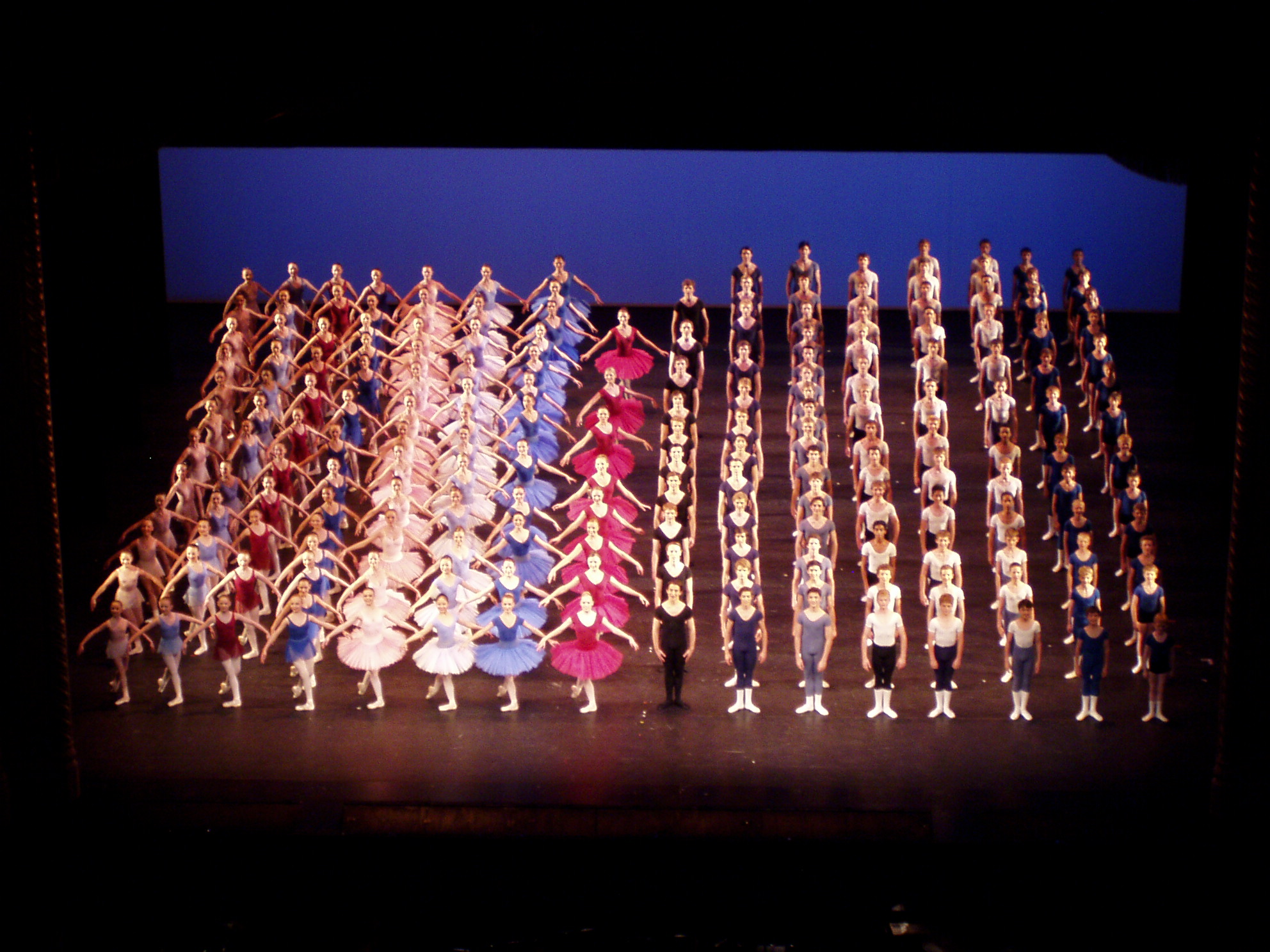
Royal Ballet School, curtain call, Royal Ballet, 2007

== Performances ==
Each year The Royal Ballet School presents its Summer Performances, featuring students from all age groups in a wide variety of classical and contemporary works. The highlight of the school's dance year is the annual matinée at the Royal Opera House, which showcases graduate students before they embark on their professional careers as well as featuring students from all years of the school. The programme includes new works and heritage pieces from the Royal Ballet repertory and culminates in a grand défilé, in which every student of the school appears on stage in a choreographed curtain call.

== Prima ballerina assoluta ==
The Royal Ballet School is unique in having trained four of only a small number of dancers in history to have been recognised as prima ballerina assoluta, the ultimate honorary title for a ballerina. Exclusively trained at The Royal Ballet School and dancing her entire professional career with The Royal Ballet, Margot Fonteyn was appointed prima ballerina assoluta of the company by Queen Elizabeth II in 1979. Having trained at The Royal Ballet School from 1959 to 1966, Eva Evdokimova would go on to become an international guest ballerina, being recognised as a prima ballerina assoluta following her performances with the Kirov Ballet in the late 1970s. The title was later recognised officially by the German Senate. Phyllis Spira began training at the Royal Ballet School in 1959, joining the Royal Ballet touring company in 1960. Choosing to shun an international ballet career, she returned to her native South Africa, where she danced the majority of her career with CAPAB ballet, today's Cape Town City Ballet. She was appointed prima ballerina assoluta by the State President of South Africa in 1984. Most recently, Royal Ballet School graduate Alessandra Ferri was appointed prima ballerina assoluta of La Scala Theatre Ballet in 1992. Another British ballerina, Alicia Markova, was also tutored by Royal Ballet School founder Ninette de Valois, and would go on to be a leading ballerina with the Ballets Russes, the first Prima Ballerina of The Royal Ballet, a founder ballerina with American Ballet Theatre, and co-founder of English National Ballet who now recognise her as the company's prima ballerina assoluta. Although not trained at The Royal Ballet School, this direct connection with school founder Ninette de Valois brings the total up to five.

== Notable students ==
- Helen Anker
- Gary Avis
- Elisa Badenes
- Matthew Ball
- Hetty Baynes
- Leanne Benjamin
- David Bintley
- Deborah Bull
- Dame Darcey Bussell
- Dusty Button
- Joseph Caley
- Lady Camden
- Chris Channing
- Flora Cheong-Leen
- Imogen Claire
- Michael Clark
- Simone Clarke
- Alina Cojocaru
- Lesley Collier
- Adam Cooper
- Lauren Cuthbertson
- David Dawson
- Daniel DeBourg
- Sir Anthony Dowell
- Samara Downs
- Viviana Durante
- Wayne Eagling
- Jennifer Ellison
- Eva Evdokimova
- Alessandra Ferri
- John Field
- Elaine Fifield
- Dame Margot Fonteyn
- Clare Francis
- Christopher Gable
- Beryl Goldwyn
- Mary Goodhew
- Margaret Graham
- Christopher Hampson
- Francesca Hayward
- Momoko Hirata
- Vanessa Hooper
- Stephen Jefferies
- Lesley Judd
- Jiří Kylián
- Diane Kruger
- Rosalyn Landor
- Brandon Lawrence
- Douglas Lee
- Sir Kenneth MacMillan
- Sandra Madgwick
- Dame Monica Mason
- Debbie McGee
- Steven McRae
- Sonoya Mizuno
- Yasmine Naghdi
- Ayako Nakano
- John Neumeier
- Marcelino Sambé
- Marianela Núñez
- Kevin O'Hare
- Annette Page
- Dame Merle Park
- John Partridge
- Sergei Polunin
- Ivan Putrov
- Samantha Raine
- Gillian Revie
- Louise Robey
- Peter Royston
- Emma Samms
- Tom Sapsford
- Lynn Seymour
- Jeremy Sheffield
- Same Antoinette Sibley
- Joseph Sissens
- Wayne Sleep
- Phyllis Spira
- David Wall
- Edward Watson
- Sarah Wildor
- Christopher Wheeldon
- Sir Peter Wright
- Miyako Yoshida
- Wong Li Lin
- Wang Ji-won
- Nakamura Kazuha
