= John Field (dancer) =

English ballet dancer, choreographer, director and teacher

John Field (22 October 1921 in Doncaster – 3 August 1991 in Esher) was an English ballet dancer, choreographer, director and teacher. He was a renowned member of the Vic-Wells Ballet and Sadler's Wells Theatre Ballet and was also artistic director of the La Scala Theatre Ballet.

== Biography ==
Born John Greenfield in Doncaster, West Riding of Yorkshire, in 1921, Field began training in dance with Edna Slocombe and Shelagh Elliott-Clarke in Liverpool. He made his stage debut with the Liverpool Ballet Club in 1938, before moving to London, where he trained at the Sadler's Wells Ballet School under Ninette de Valois. He joined the Vic-Wells Ballet in 1939 and danced with the company for two years before leaving to serve in the Royal Air Force during World War II. On returning to the company, he was promoted to the rank of Principal Dancer, partnering many of the leading British ballerinas of the 20th century, including Dame Beryl Grey, Dame Margot Fonteyn and Svetlana Beriosova.

In 1946, the Vic-Wells Ballet relocated from Sadler's Wells to the Royal Opera House in Covent Garden, becoming known as the Royal Ballet in 1956. To continue ballet performances at Sadler's Wells, a sister company was formed known as the Sadler's Wells Theatre Ballet, with Field appointed as its founder Artistic Director. The company would be the predecessor of today's Birmingham Royal Ballet. After a number of years directing the Sadler's Wells company, in 1970 Field was appointed co-director of the Royal Ballet alongside Sir Kenneth MacMillan. He held the position for a year, but his relationship with MacMillan deteriorated and he eventually resigned, after being invited to take the post of artistic director at La Scala Theatre Ballet and the La Scala Theatre Ballet School in Milan, Italy. He was artistic director of La Scala for three years from 1971 to 1974.

On returning to England in 1975, Field was appointed director of the Royal Academy of Dancing and was a director of the British Ballet Organization. He also taught at the Arts Educational School in London. His last post with a professional ballet company was as artistic director of the London Festival Ballet, today's English National Ballet. Following his death in 1991, it was decided to hold a regular summer school in his memory, so the John Field Memorial Ballet Seminars were established in 1993 and ran for a number of years.

Field married the dancer and teacher Anne Heaton in 1958. She died in 2020.
