= Patrick Centre =

Theatre in Birmingham, England

Coordinates: 52.474593°N 1.898425°W

The Patrick Centre for the Performing Arts is a studio theatre located on Thorp Street in the Chinese Quarter of Birmingham, England, next to the headquarters of the Birmingham Royal Ballet and the Birmingham Hippodrome (public access is via the Hippodrome). Seating 206, it is operated by DanceXchange and specialises in the staging of contemporary dance.

The theatre was designed by Associated Architects. It was opened in 2001.
