= Rye whiskey (disambiguation) =

Rye whiskey generally refers to whiskies distilled from rye.

In music it may refer to:

- "Way Up on Clinch Mountain", a traditional Scottish folk song, recorded as
  - "Rye Whiskey" by country and western singer Tex Ritter in the 1930s
  - "Rye Whiskey" by folk singer Woody Guthrie
  - "Rye Whiskey" by Norwegian musician Susanna Wallumrød
- "Jack of Diamonds", another traditional song sometimes known as "Rye Whiskey"
- "Whiskey and Rye" as in the song American Pie by Don McLean
- "Rye Whiskey", a song by the Punch Brothers
