= Scènes de ballet (Wheeldon) =

Scénes de ballet was performed with students from the School of American Ballet and choreographed by Christopher Wheeldon to Stravinsky's eponymous music from 1944. It was Wheeldon's second work for the New York City Ballet. The premiere took place on Wednesday, May 19, 1999, at the New York State Theater with a set designed by Ian Falconer and costumes designed by Holly Hynes. For the ballet, Falconer created a Russian ballet studio, bisected by a "real" barre and an imaginary mirror. Sixty-four ballet students ranging from the very young to those in their last year of study were cast, some as "real" dancers and others as their "reflection" in the "mirror".

== Original cast ==
young dancers

- Isabel Vondermuhll
- Jan Burkhard
- Zakary Yermolenko
- Ryan Cardea

== Reviews ==
- NY Times, Anna Kisselgoff, May 21, 1999
- NY Times, Jennifer Dunning, May 30, 2006

- NY Times, John Rockwell, June 7, 2006
- NY Times, Roslyn Sulcas, June 10, 2010

== Articles ==
- NY Times, Jennifer Dunning, February 19, 2006
