= Scènes de ballet (Stravinsky) =

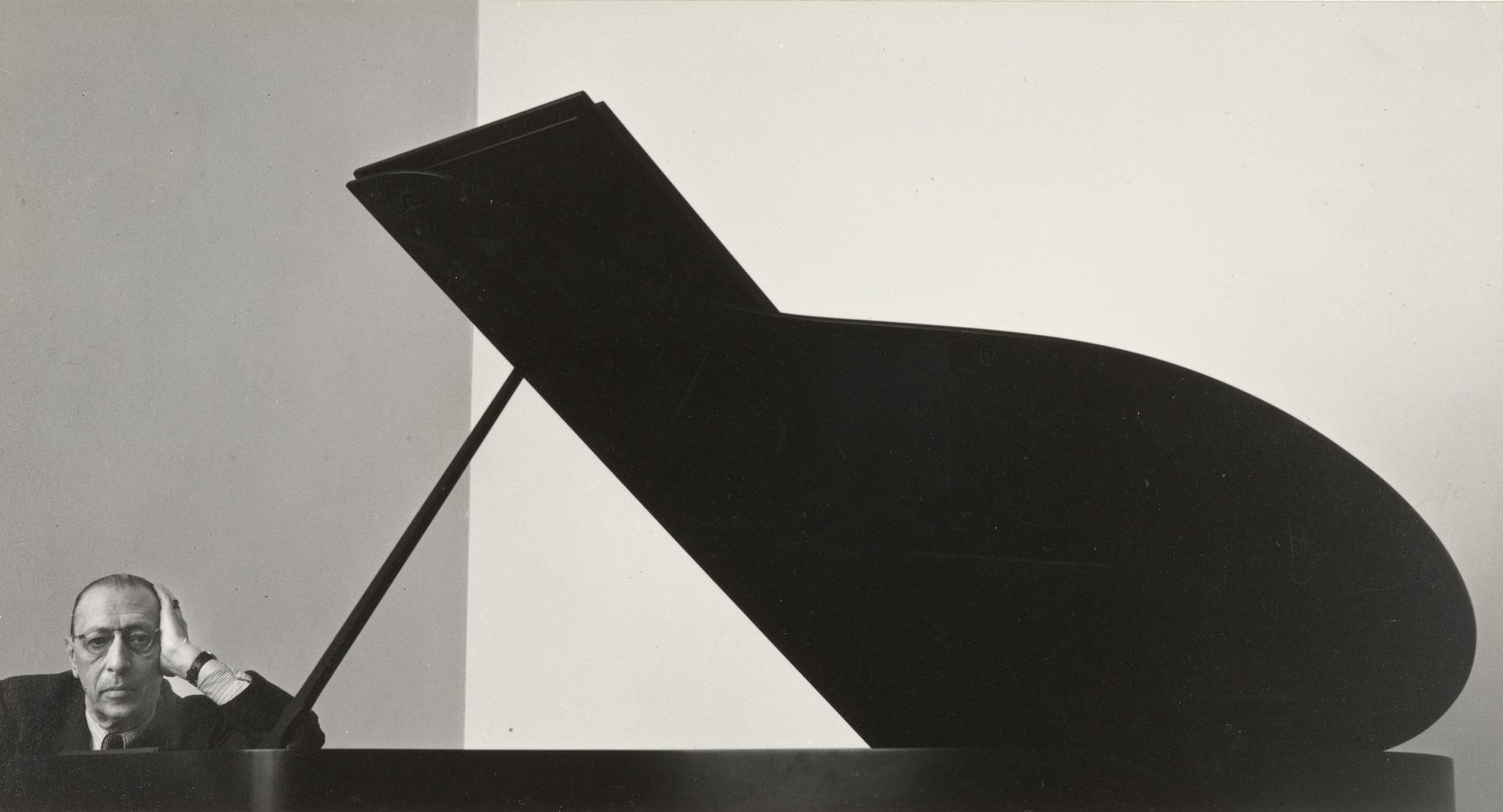
Photograph of Igor Stravinsky by Arnold Newman

Scènes de ballet is a suite of dance movements composed in 1944 by Igor Stravinsky. It was commissioned by Broadway producer Billy Rose for inclusion in the revue The Seven Lively Arts that opened at the Ziegfeld Theater on December 7, 1944.

The Seven Lively Arts brought together a number of notable performers: Beatrice Lillie, Bert Lahr, Benny Goodman, and "Doc" Rockwell as well as showgirls – "the prettiest around at the moment," according to The New York Times review.

The solo dancers for the Scènes de ballet were Alicia Markova and Anton Dolin (who was also the choreographer). Although Rose had requested a 15-minute work, "the music was cut to a fraction of its original length when The Seven Lively Arts ... opened in New York."

== Music ==
Scènes de ballet is a score of between 16 and 18 minutes duration, written in 1944. It was commissioned by Billy Rose for a Broadway revue. The music occasioned one of the best-known Stravinsky anecdotes. Rose telegraphed Stravinsky: "YOUR MUSIC GREAT SUCCESS STOP COULD BE SENSATIONAL SUCCESS IF YOU WOULD AUTHORISE ROBERT RUSSELL BENNETT RETOUCH ORCHESTRATION STOP BENNETT ORCHESTRATES EVEN THE WORKS OF COLE PORTER." To which Stravinsky telegraphed back: "SATISFIED WITH GREAT SUCCESS."

The score is in nine sections. The timings are those of the composer's 1963 recording.

- Introduction 0:52
- Danses (Corps de ballet & Ballerina) 4:34
- Pantomime 2:08
- Pas de deux 2:49
- Pantomime 0:31
- Variations (Danseur & Ballerina) 2:24
- Pantomime 0:27
- Danses (Corps de ballet) 1:03
- Apothéose 2:12

== Reception ==
On 8 December 1944, Lewis Nichols wrote a generally favorable review of the show, although he observed: "Markova and Dolin also have a couple of numbers, one to Stravinsky music, which probably is not the best they ever have done."

Stravinsky himself later observed: "Scènes de ballet is a period piece, a portrait of Broadway in the last years of the War. It is featherweight and sugared—my sweet tooth was not yet carious, then—but I will not deprecate it, not even the second Pantomime, and all of it is at least well made."

== Subsequent productions ==
- 1947–48: Frederick Ashton: Sadler's Wells Ballet.
- 1972: John Taras: New York City Ballet.
- 1999: Christopher Wheeldon: School of American Ballet.
