= Birmingham Royal Ballet =

UK ballet company

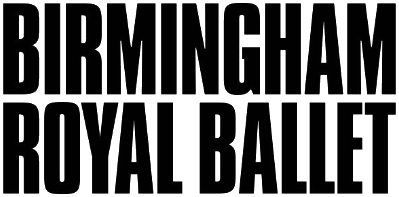

General information
- Name: Birmingham Royal Ballet
- Previous names: Sadler's Wells Theatre Ballet; Royal Ballet Touring Group; Sadler's Wells Royal Ballet
- Year founded: 1946
- Founder: Dame Ninette de Valois
- Founding artistic director: John Field
- Director Laureate: Sir Peter Wright
- Principal venue: Birmingham Hippodrome; Hurst Street, Birmingham; England, B5 4TB
- Website: brb.org.uk

Senior staff
- Chief executive: Paul James
- Director: Carlos Acosta
- Assistant director: Dominic Antonucci
- Company manager: Tristan Rusdale
- Ballet Staff: Patricia Tierney, Samara Downs, Laëtitia Lo Sardo, Rory Mackay, Jonathan Payn, Marion Tait

Artistic staff
- Music director: Paul Murphy; Thomas Jung (Principal Guest Conductor)

Other
- Sister company: The Royal Ballet
- Orchestra: Royal Ballet Sinfonia
- Official school: The Royal Ballet School
- Formation: Principal Guest Artist; Principal; Principal Character Artist; First Soloist; Soloist; First Artist; Artist; BRB2; Apprentice

Birmingham Royal Ballet (BRB) is one of the five major ballet companies of the United Kingdom, alongside The Royal Ballet, the English National Ballet, Northern Ballet and Scottish Ballet. Founded as the Sadler's Wells Theatre Ballet, the company was established in 1946 as a sister company to the earlier Sadler's Wells company, which moved to the Royal Opera House that same year, subsequently becoming known as The Royal Ballet.

The new company was formed under the direction of John Field and remained at Sadler's Wells for many years, becoming known as the Sadler's Wells Royal Ballet in 1977. It also toured the UK and abroad, before relocating to Birmingham in 1990, where it uses the Birmingham Hippodrome stage when performing in the city. Birmingham Royal Ballet has extensive custom-built facilities, including a suite of dance studios, the Jerwood Centre for the Prevention and Treatment of Dance Injuries and a studio theatre known as the Patrick Centre. In 1997, the Birmingham Royal Ballet became independent of The Royal Ballet in London.

== History ==
In 1926, the Irish-born dancer Ninette de Valois founded the Academy of Choreographic Art, a dance school for girls. Her intention was to form a repertory ballet company and school, leading her to collaborate with the English theatrical producer and theatre owner Lilian Baylis. Baylis owned the Old Vic and Sadler's Wells theatres, and in 1925, she engaged de Valois to stage dance performances at both venues.

Sadler's Wells reopened in 1931, and the Vic-Wells Ballet and Vic-Wells Ballet School were established in premises at the theatre. These would become the predecessors of today's Royal Ballet, Birmingham Royal Ballet and Royal Ballet School.

In 1939, the company lost its link with the Old Vic theatre, and in 1940, Sadler's Wells theatre was bombed during World War II. These events forced the company to begin touring the country, becoming known as the Sadler's Wells Ballet. The company did return to Sadler's Wells theatre, where it stayed until 1946, when the company was invited to become the resident ballet company of the newly re-opened Royal Opera House in Covent Garden. The company relocated to the opera house the same year in 1946, with their first production at the venue being Ninette de Valois' staging of The Sleeping Beauty.

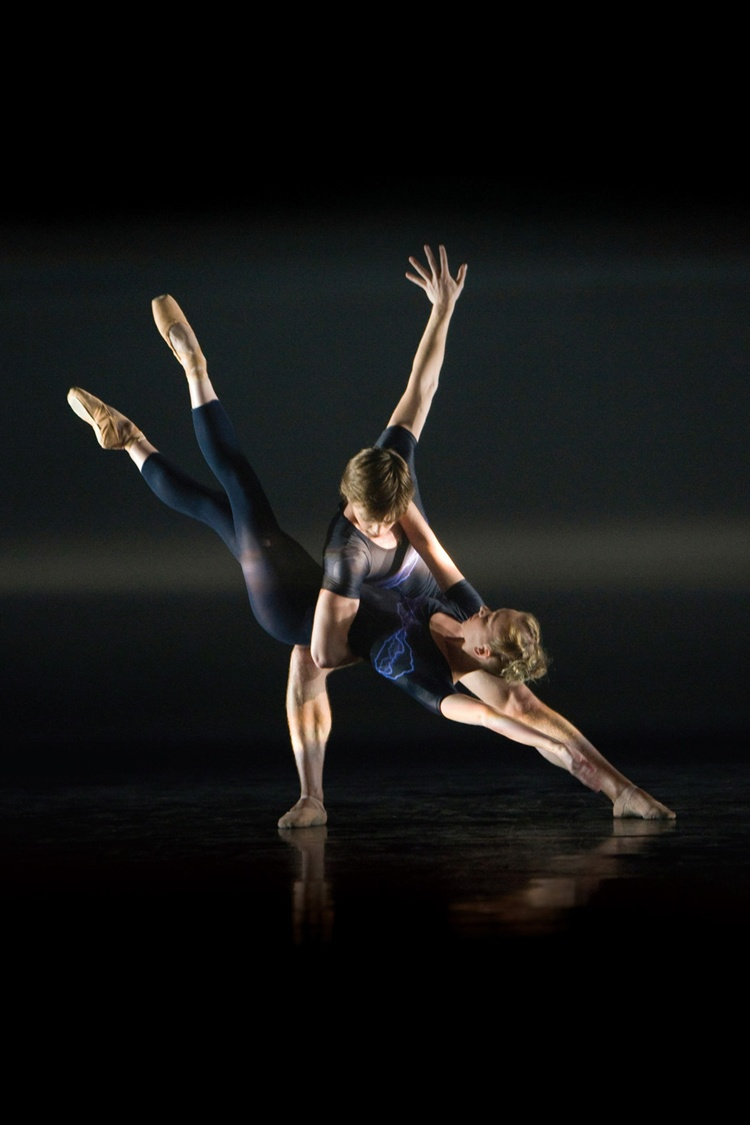
Birmingham Royal Ballet performing E=MC2 in Tokyo in 2011

Following the relocation of the company, the school was relocated to its own premises in 1947, and a sister company was established to continue performances at Sadler's Wells, called Sadler's Wells Theatre Ballet. This sister company would become the predecessor of today's Birmingham Royal Ballet. The first Artistic Director of the Sadler's Wells Theatre Ballet was John Field, who was later made co-director of the Royal Ballet and also worked as artistic director of La Scala Theatre Ballet and English National Ballet.

In 1955, Sadler's Wells Theatre Ballet temporarily lost its link with Sadler's Wells theatre and relocated to the Royal Opera House as a touring unit of the main company.

In 1956, a royal charter was granted for both companies and the school, and they were subsequently renamed the Royal Ballet, Sadler's Wells Royal Ballet and the Royal Ballet School.

The Sadler's Wells Royal Ballet returned to Sadler's Wells theatre in 1970, whilst continuing to tour the country. The first indication that the company would leave London came in 1987, when the company was invited to become the resident ballet company at the Birmingham Hippodrome theatre. Consequently, the company relocated to Birmingham in 1990, being given its current name Birmingham Royal Ballet.

Sir Peter Wright was the company's Artistic Director from 1977 until his retirement in 1995, when David Bintley was appointed Artistic Director. In 1997, Birmingham Royal Ballet was made independent of the Royal Ballet and ceased to be managed by the Royal Opera House. In January 2019 it was announced that acclaimed Cuban dancer Carlos Acosta would succeed Bintley as artistic director in January 2020.

== Works performed ==
Table of works performed by Birmingham Royal Ballet
| Title | Running Time (mins) | Choreographer | Composer |
|---|---|---|---|
| Agon | 28 | George Balanchine | Igor Stravinsky |
| All for a Kiss | 5 | Aonghus Hoole | Igor Stravinsky |
| Apollo | 30 | George Balanchine | Igor Stravinsky |
| Arthur pt I | 60,45 | David Bintley | John McCabe |
| Arthur pt II | 58,65 | David Bintley | John McCabe |
| Avec Moi Ce Soir | | Glyn Scott | Igor Stravinsky |
| Le Baiser de la fée | 45 | Michael Corder | Igor Stravinsky |
| Beauty and the Beast | 50,50 | David Bintley | Glenn Buhr |
| Black Sabbath - The Ballet | 30, 30, 30 | Pontus Lidberg, Raúl Reinoso & Cassi Abranches | Black Sabbath, Christopher Austin, Marko Nyberg & Sun Keting |
| Bright Young Things | 30 | Oliver Hindle | George Gershwin |
| Brouillards | 37 | John Cranko | Claude Debussy |
| Card Game | 24 | John Cranko | Igor Stravinsky |
| Carmina Burana | 67 | David Bintley | Carl Orff |
| Carnival of the Animals | 25 | David Justin, Toby Norman-Wright, Jonathan Payn, Nicole Tongue | Camille Saint-Saëns |
| Checkmate | 46 | Ninette de Valois | Arthur Bliss |
| Choros | 30 | David Bintley | Aubrey Meyer |
| Concert Fantasy | 30 | David Bintley | Pyotr Ilyich Tchaikovsky |
| Concerto | 24 | Kenneth MacMillan | Dmitri Shostakovich |
| Concerto Barocco | 20 | George Balanchine | Johann Sebastian Bach |
| Coppélia | 35,28,38 | Peter Wright after Marius Petipa & Enrico Cecchetti | Léo Delibes |
| Cyrano | 53,33,41 | David Bintley | Carl Davis |
| The Dance House | 26 | David Bintley | Dmitri Shostakovich |
| Danses Concertantes | | Kit Holder, Glyn Scott, Aonghus Hoole, Kosuke Yamamoto | Igor Stravinsky |
| Dante Sonata | 17 | Frederick Ashton | Franz Liszt arr Constant Lambert |
| Daphnis et Chloé | 55 | Frederick Ashton | Maurice Ravel |
| The Dream | 54 | Frederick Ashton | Felix Mendelssohn |
| Dumbarton Oaks | 15 | Michael Kopinski | Igor Stravinsky |
| Duo Concertant | 17 | George Balanchine | Igor Stravinsky |
| Ebony Concerto | | Samara Downs | Igor Stravinsky |
| Edward II | 60,55 | David Bintley | John McCabe |
| Elite Syncopations | 38 | Kenneth MacMillan | Scott Joplin et al. |
| The End of Winter | | Kosuke Yamamoto | Igor Stravinsky |
| Enigma Variations | 34 | Frederick Ashton | Edward Elgar |
| Façade | 20 | Frederick Ashton | William Walton |
| Fancy Free | 31 | Jerome Robbins | Leonard Bernstein |
| Far from the Madding Crowd | 50,40,40 | David Bintley | Paul Reade |
| La Fille Mal Gardée | 28,34,38 | Frederick Ashton | Ferdinand Hérold |
| The Firebird | 47 | Mikhail Fokine | Igor Stravinsky |
| Five Brahms Waltzes in the Manner of Isadora Duncan | 8 | Frederick Ashton | Johannes Brahms |
| Five Tangos | 27 | Hans van Manen | Ástor Piazzolla |
| Four Seasons | 45 | Oliver Hindle, Shimon Kalichman, Mikaela Polley, Samira Saidi, Asier Uriagereka, Richard Whistler, Yuri Zhukov | Antonio Vivaldi |
| The Four Seasons | 46 | Oliver Hindle | Antonio Vivaldi |
| The Four Temperaments | 32 | George Balanchine | Paul Hindemith |
| Giselle | 55,46 | Marius Petipa after Jean Coralli & Jules Perrot | Adolphe Adam |
| Grosse Fuge | 27 | Hans van Manen | Ludwig van Beethoven |
| Hobson's Choice | 34,28,42 | David Bintley | Paul Reade |
| In the Upper Room | 40 | Twyla Tharp | Philip Glass |
| Into the Ferment | 25 | Jonathan Payn | James MacMillan |
| Krishna | 35 | Nahid Siddiqui | Hariprasad Chaurasia |
| The Lady and the Fool | 48 | John Cranko | Giuseppe Verdi arr Charles Mackerras |
| Much A-Dance About Nothing | | Jenny Murphy | Igor Stravinsky |
| Nine Sinatra Songs | 33 | Twyla Tharp | |
| The Nutcracker | 50,50 | Peter Wright, Lev Ivanov, Vincent Redmon | Pyotr Ilyich Tchaikovsky |
| The Nutcracker Sweeties | 35 | David Bintley | Duke Ellington & Billy Strayhorn (after Pyotr Ilyich Tchaikovsky) |
| Orpheus | 30 | George Balanchine | Igor Stravinsky |
| The Orpheus Suite | 45 | David Bintley | Colin Towns |
| Paquita | 28 | Marius Petipa | Ludwig Minkus |
| Les Petits Riens | 25 | David Bintley | Wolfgang Amadeus Mozart |
| Petrushka | 38 | Michel Fokine | Igor Stravinsky |
| Pictures at an Exhibition | 35 | Shimon Kalichman, Toby Norman-Wright, Annette Pain, Jonathan Payn, Mikaela Polley, Samira Saidi, Nicole Tongue, Richard Whistler, Asier Uriagereka, Yuri Zhukov | Modest Mussorgsky arr Maurice Ravel |
| Pineapple Poll | 41 | John Cranko | Arthur Sullivan arr Charles Mackerras |
| The Planets | 53 | Rosie Kay, David Bintley, Samara Downs, Lei Zhao, Michael Kopinski, Kit Holder, Jenny Murphy | Gustav Holst |
| Powder | 33 | Stanton Welch | Wolfgang Amadeus Mozart |
| Prodigal Son | 36 | George Balanchine | Sergey Prokofiev |
| The Prospect Before Us | 38 | Ninette de Valois | William Boyce arr Constant Lambert |
| The Protecting Veil | 43 | David Bintley | John Tavener |
| Pulcinella | 40 | Kim Brandstrup | Igor Stravinsky |
| Raymonda Act III | 34 | Rudolf Nureyev | Alexander Glazunov |
| The Rite of Spring | 35 | Millicent Hodson after Vaslav Nijinsky | Igor Stravinsky |
| Romeo and Juliet | 60,34,40 | Kenneth MacMillan | Sergey Prokofiev |
| Sanctum | 26 | Lila York | Maurice Ravel & Christopher Rouse |
| Scènes de Ballet | 22 | Frederick Ashton | Igor Stravinsky |
| The Seasons | 32 | David Bintley | Giuseppe Verdi |
| Serenade | 34 | George Balanchine | Pyotr Ilyich Tchaikovsky |
| The Shakespeare Suite | 38 | David Bintley | Duke Ellington & Billy Strayhorn |
| Slaughter on Tenth Avenue | 25 | George Balanchine | Richard Rodgers |
| The Sleeping Beauty | 34,30,32,39 | Marius Petipa, Peter Wright | Pyotr Ilyich Tchaikovsky |
| Small Worlds | | Kit Holder | Igor Stravinsky |
| Solitaire | 27 | Kenneth MacMillan | Malcolm Arnold |
| Song of the Earth | 63 | Kenneth MacMillan | Gustav Mahler |
| The Sons of Horus | 30 | David Bintley | Peter McGowan |
| 'Still Life' at the Penguin Cafe | 42 | David Bintley | Simon Jeffes |
| Stravinsky Violin Concerto | 20 | George Balanchine | Igor Stravinsky |
| Swan Lake | 32,32,44,20 | Marius Petipa, Lev Ivanov & Peter Wright | Pyotr Ilyich Tchaikovsky |
| Symphonic Variations | 21 | Frederick Ashton | César Franck |
| Symphony in Three Movements | 24 | George Balanchine | Igor Stravinsky |
| Take Five | 25 | David Bintley | The Dave Brubeck Quartet transcribed by Colin Towns |
| Tombeaux | 25 | David Bintley | William Walton |
| Tweedledum and Tweedledee | 5 | Frederick Ashton | Percy Grainger |
| The Two Pigeons | 27,33 | Frederick Ashton | André Messager |
| Unravelled | | Nathanael Skelton | Igor Stravinsky |
| Voice of Spring | 4 | Frederick Ashton | Johann Strauss II |
| The Walk to the Paradise Garden | 9 | Frederick Ashton | Frederick Delius |
| Western Symphony | 30 | George Balanchine | trad American melodies arr by Hershy Kay |

== The company ==
The Birmingham Royal Ballet employs 63 dancers and a complete list as of 2026 is shown below.

The company also has an Executive, Artistic and Music staff, including the following:

- Director – Carlos Acosta, a former dancer with The Royal Ballet and Director of both Birmingham Royal Ballet and Acosta Danza
- Music Director – Paul Murphy
- CEO – Paul James

== Dancers ==
=== Principals ===
| Name | Nationality | Training | Joined BRB | Promoted to Principal |
|---|---|---|---|---|
| Tzu-Chao Chou | Taiwan | Australian Ballet School | 2011 | 2017 |
| Mathias Dingman | United Kingdom | Kirov Academy of Ballet | 2006 | 2015 |
| Céline Gittens | Canada | Goh Ballet Academy | 2006 | 2016 |
| Yu Kurihara | Japan | Royal Ballet School | 2018 | 2025 |
| Momoko Hirata | Japan | Reiko Yamamoto Ballet School; Royal Ballet School | 2003 | 2013 |
| Max Maslen | United Kingdom | Central School of Ballet | 2012 | 2023 |
| Miki Mitzutani | Japan | English National Ballet School | 2012 | 2022 |
| Lachlan Monaghan | Australia | Royal Ballet School | 2012 | 2023 |
| Beatrice Parma | Italy | La Scala Theatre Ballet School; English National Ballet School | 2015 | 2024 |
| Yaoqian Shang | China | Royal Ballet School | 2013 | 2022 |

=== Principal Character Artists ===
- Rory Mackay (Répétiteur)
- Jonathan Payn (Répétiteur)
- Daria Stanciulescu

=== First Soloists ===
- Enrique Bejarano Vidal
- Yasiel Hodelín Bello
- Riku Ito
- Katherine Ochoa

=== Soloists ===
- Karla Doorbar
- Rosanna Ely
- Haoliang Feng
- Reina Fuchigami
- Ryan Felix
- Mason King
- Sofia Liñares

=== First Artists ===
- Gabriel Anderson
- Rachele Pizillo
- Eilis Small
- Yuki Sugiura
- Amelia Thompson
- Lucy Waine

=== Artists ===
- Louis Andreasen
- Olivia Chang Clarke
- Ixan Ferrer
- Tori Forsyth-Hecken
- Alisa Garkavenko
- August Generalli
- Luciano Ghidoli
- Miles Gilliver
- Tom Hazelby
- Frieda Kaden
- Maïlène Katoch
- Airi Kobayashi
- Ava May Llewellyn
- Alexandra Manuel
- Hannah Martin
- Matilde Rodrigues
- Lynsey Sutherland
- Sophie Walters
- Gillian Whitall

=== BRB2 ===
- Mikel Arana Arzak
- Jacopo Biancucci
- Noah Campbell
- John Fontanini
- Alfie-Lee Hall
- Yasemin Kayabay
- Marlo Kempsy-Fagg
- Sophia Koo
- Yoli Meurisse
- Addison Partlow
- Samuel Pereira
- Martha Savin
- Denis Teixeira

=== Apprentices ===
- Ted (Heng-Yu) Peng

== See also ==
- The Royal Ballet, sister company of the Birmingham Royal Ballet
- Royal Ballet School, official ballet school of the company
- English National Ballet
- Elmhurst Ballet School
