= Brouillards =

Piano piece by Claude Debussy

Brouillards
Performed by Giorgi Latsabidze

"Brouillards" ("Mists" or "Fog") is the first piece of Claude Debussy's second set of piano préludes. It can be considered as the most harmonically complex of the entire series of preludes, hinting at polytonality. The left hand mainly employs the C diatonic collection, modulating shortly in the second theme and reverting in the coda, while the right hand uses the A♭ minor diatonic collection on E♭, like the left hand modulating briefly before returning.
