= Western Symphony =

Ballet by George Balanchine

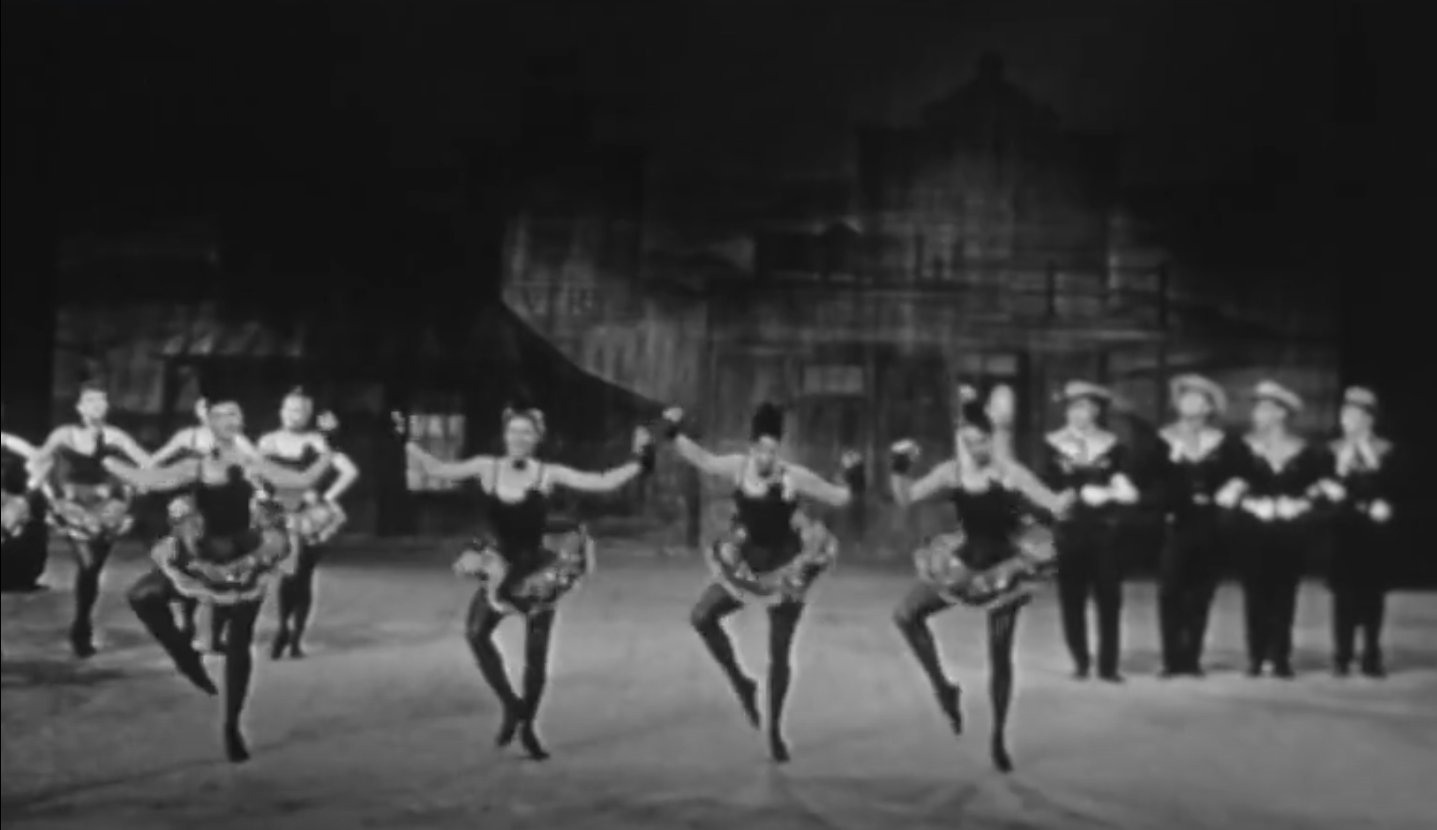
A rendition of Western Symphony performed by the New York City Ballet in 1954.

Western Symphony is a ballet made by New York City Ballet co-founder and founding choreographer George Balanchine to American folk tunes arranged by Hershy Kay. It premiered on September 7, 1954 at the City Center of Music and Drama in New York. The ballet was originally presented in practice clothes without scenery. Scenery by John Boyt and costumes by Karinska were added in 1955. Lighting was originally by Jean Rosenthal and subsequently Mark Stanley. Set in the Western United States, the ballet features cowboys and dance hall girls (or saloon girls).

== Setting ==
The ballet follows no plot but presents several short stories throughout the ballet (similar to Serenade) outside a saloon. It is almost a satire on classical ballet with imitations of Giselle and Swan Lake (second movement). The ballet originally had four movements:

=== Allegro ===
The Allegro is for four cowboys, eight girls (divided into two groups of four) and a lead couple. The lengthy Allegro goes for about ten minutes.

=== Adagio (Waltz) ===
The Adagio (Waltz) is for a lead couple and four girls representing horses. This movement is set at night. The cowboy is chasing after the lead girl who eludes him and eventually, after some flirtation, leaves without him.

=== Scherzo ===
The Scherzo was removed ca. 1960 due to the complex nature of the female bravura dancing required.

=== Rondo ===
The Rondo has a lead couple but is for the entire cast.

== Music ==
Hershey Kay adapted and arranged the music from traditional Western melodies:

- Red River Valley
- Old Taylor
- Rye Whiskey
- Lolly-Too-Dum
- Good Night, Ladies
- Oh, Dem Golden Slippers
- The Girl I Left Behind Me

Although the movements are entitled Allegro, Adagio (Waltz) and Rondo they don't really remain true to their titles. There is an extended Adagio pas de deux section in the Allegro, and similarly with the Adagio, the Waltz speeds up to a lively tempo.

== Original cast ==
- First movement: Allegro

- Diana Adams

and 8 women

- Herbert Bliss

and 4 men

- Second movement: Adagio

- Janet Reed

and 4 women

- Nicholas Magallanes

- Third movement: Scherzo

- Patricia Wilde

and 4 women

- André Eglevsky

- Fourth movement: Rondo

- Tanaquil LeClercq

and 4 women

- Jacques d'Amboise

and 4 men

== Recording ==
1959 KAPP records Inc. produced a recording by the New York City Ballet Orchestra, Robert Irving, Conductor. Side one was "Stars and Stripes" and side two was "Western Symphony". KAPP Classics High Fidelity (KCL-9036)

== Television broadcasts, filmography and videography ==
=== Television ===
- Australian television (Fourth movement Rondo) 1958
- French television, FR3 (Balanchine à Arc et Senans) 1977
- PBS, Dance in America, Balanchine (Fourth movement Rondo) 1984
- PBS, Dance in America, Balanchine in America (excluding the Third movement Scherzo) 1990
- PBS, Dance in America, The Balanchine Celebration (Fourth movement Rondo and finale) 1993
- BBC 2 (London) 1993

=== Film ===
- Monitor Productions, 1955

=== Video ===
- The Balanchine Library, The Balanchine Celebration, Part Two (Fourth movement Rondo, 1993), 1996
- Kultur, Balanchine (excerpts from the Second movement Adagio and Fourth movement Rondo), 2004

== Reviews ==
- NY Times by John Martin, September 8, 1954
- NY Times by John Martin, October 31, 1962
- NY review by Clive Barnes, May 17, 1968
- NY Times by Jennifer Dunning, February 3, 1981
- NY Times by Jack Anderson, May 28, 2004
- NY Times by Alastair Macaulay, February 12, 2008
- NY Times by Alastair Macaulay, October 9, 2010
