= MOVE IT =

Annual dance event in London

Coordinates: 51°29′47″N 0°12′35″W

MOVE IT is the world's biggest dance event, taking place over three days annually at ExCeL, London.

== History ==
MOVE IT was first held in London in 2005, the creation of Georgina Harper. The show was initially put on by Jonathan Scott/Value Added Events Ltd. In 2007, the show was bought by Upper Street Events and is now part of the live events portfolio of Immediate Media.

== Program and Features ==
The creative program includes over 100 main stage performances, 160 dance classes, a freestyle stage, dance competitions, and auditions, and in 2023 hosts the UK Hip Hop Dance Championships.

- MOVE IT hosts exhibitors including UK, European and international dance retailers, plus womenswear and sportswear retailers.
- The freestyle stage allows anyone attending to demonstrate their dancing skills in front of the public.
- The main stage holds performances by dance companies, dance schools and professionals. Performers past and present include: Flawless, Layton Williams, and Tasha Ghouri of Love Island.
- Auditions are held every year for professional dancers. Past and present auditions include: Disneyland Resort Paris, Cirque du Soleil, and in 2023, Royal Caribbean Cruises.

== Awards ==
MOVE IT won an Association of Event Organisers (AEO) Excellence Award for best Best Consumer Show under 2000 square metres for the 2009 event.
