= Dante Sonata =

Piano sonata by Franz Liszt

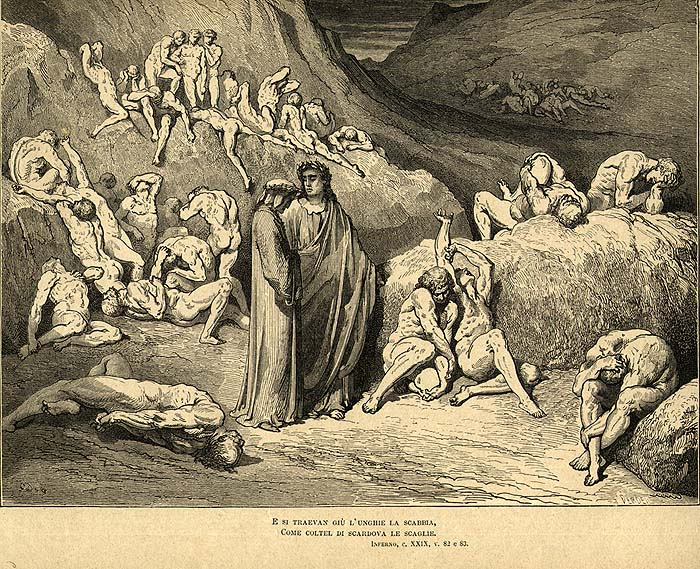
The highly programmatic themes depict the souls of Hell wailing in anguish.

Après une lecture du Dante: Fantasia quasi Sonata (French, 'After a Reading of Dante: Fantasia quasi Sonata'; also known as the Dante Sonata) is a piano sonata in one movement, written by Hungarian composer Franz Liszt in 1849. The final version was completed between 1853 and 1856 and first published in 1858 as part of the second volume of his Années de pèlerinage (Years of Pilgrimage). This work of program music was inspired by the reading of Victor Hugo's poem “Après une lecture de Dante” (1836).

== Background ==
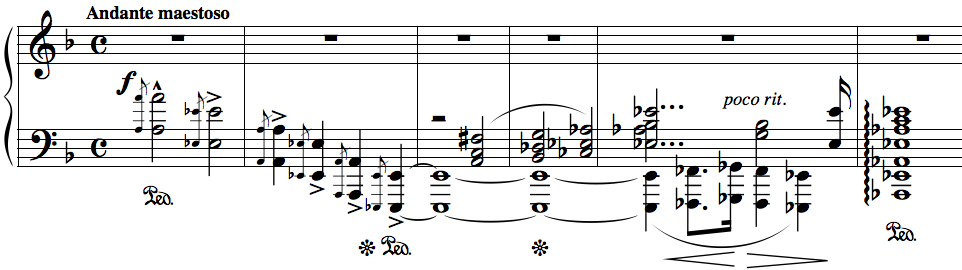
Introduction

The Dante Sonata was originally a small piece entitled Fragment after Dante, consisting of two thematically related movements, which Liszt composed in the late 1830s. He gave the first public performance in Vienna in November 1839. When he settled in Weimar in 1849, he revised the work along with others in the volume, and gave the work its present title, taken from Victor Hugo's poem "Après une lecture de Dante". The musical idea itself derives directly from Dante's Divine Comedy, as the early titles Fragment dantesque and Paralipomènes à la Divina Commedia show. It was published in 1858 as part of Années de pèlerinage.

== Composition ==
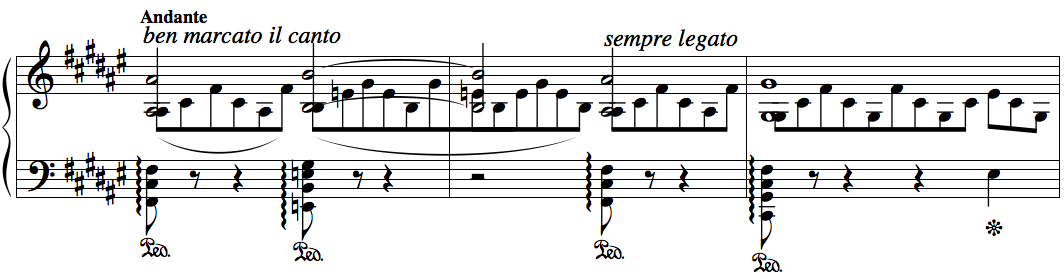
The second subject is a derivation of the first

The piece is divided into two main subjects. The first, a chromatic theme in D minor, typifies the wailing of souls in Hell. D minor is a common key for music relating to death, as evidenced by other compositions such as Liszt's Totentanz and the statue scene of Wolfgang Amadeus Mozart's Don Giovanni. The first theme also heavily uses the tritone (augmented 4th or diminished 5th); this interval was known as the Devil's interval (or "Devil in music") and further reinforces the hellish imagery. The second theme is a beatific chorale in F♯ major, derived from the first, which represents the joy of those in Heaven. The key is also symbolic here, being the signature for other uplifting works of Liszt's, including Benediction of God in Solitude (part of Harmonies poétiques et religieuses) and Les Jeux d'eaux à la Villa d'Este (Années de pèlerinage, vol. 3, no. 4). The secondary theme may also represent Beatrice, as it is interspersed within chromatic areas, similar to the character's appearances in hell. The piece ends with a rapid chromatic octave section that when played at speed seems to split into three distinct themes, reflecting Satan's three faces in Dante's Inferno.

The structure of the sonata is sonata elements within a single movement fantasy. Three short motives are introduced in the slow Andante maestoso opening (tritone in parallel octaves masking tonic; tritone as unifying motive throughout). Theme 1 in D minor is introduced at measure 30. The second theme, in the raised mediant F♯ major, is chorale-like. Development is reminiscent of the opening material, working both themes. There is an ostinato of 2 tritones at measure 181. The recapitulation omits the first theme; the second theme is in D major. The ending (Coda) measure 326 is diatonic, IV–ii–I (not the usual closing dominant-tonic cadence).

== Critical assessment ==
Humphrey Searle called it "a strange, confused, and passionate piece, perhaps incoherent and inchoate, but conjuring up a powerful and unmistakable atmosphere." Carl Dahlhaus reads the work as a three-theme "fantasia quasi sonata" in which the secondary theme retains the main theme's melodic substance while varying its rhythm, at once a single sonata movement and a multimovement cycle. David Trippett takes the sonata as a case study in the problematic juncture between improvisation and composition, raising questions about the modern work-concept and the function of performance within a musical text.

== See also ==
- Dante Symphony
- Piano Sonata in B minor (Liszt)
