= Scènes de ballet (Ashton) =

1948 English ballet

- Choreographer: Frederick Ashton
- Music: Igor Stravinsky
- Premiere: 11 February 1948; Royal Opera House, London
- Original ballet company: Sadler's Wells Ballet
- Setting: Paris
- Created for: Margot Fonteyn
- Genre: Neoclassical ballet
- Type: classical ballet

Scènes de ballet is a one-act ballet choreographed by Frederick Ashton, who created it during 1947–1948 to Igor Stravinsky's eponymous music from 1944. The first performance was given by the Sadler's Wells Ballet, at the Royal Opera House, London.

== Creation, choreography and design ==
Ashton's choreography is along classical lines, in the tradition of Marius Petipa's 19th-century works. Instead of Petipa's symmetry, however, Ashton used a system of Euclidean geometry, with geometric theorems adapted to serve as floor patterns for the dancers. As a result, the ballet is unusual in that it makes sense from all angles, as Ashton himself explained, "I wanted to do a ballet that could be seen from any angle – anywhere could be front, so to speak. So I did these geometric figures that are not always facing front – if you saw Scènes de ballet from the wings, you'd get a very different but equally good picture."

The ballet was originally designed by André Beaurepaire, a young Frenchman who was heavily influenced by Picasso. His collaboration with Ashton was not an easy one, given the choreographer's wish for what Parry calls "Baroque Parisian fantasy". Eventually, two sets were agreed upon: a green-grey viaduct that was supposed to give way, at the apotheosis, to a white pavilion made up of guns, bones, and limbs. In the event this proved impractical, and since the ballet's second performance the viaduct has been used on its own, although at the premiere Ashton went with the pavilion. Nor were Beaurepaire's designs for the costumes quite to Ashton's liking: though the choreographer retained his designer's hats, bracelets and chokers he discarded the men's hats and altered the colour of the tights from blue-gray to pink. Pearls and diamonds were added to the women's costumes, while the men's costumes were simplified. The prima ballerina was given a colour combination of yellow and black to suit Margot Fonteyn.

== Original cast ==
- Margot Fonteyn
- Michael Somes
- Alexander Grant
- John Field
- Donald Britton
- Philip Chatfield
- Avril Navarre
- Pauline Clayden
- Margaret Dale
- Anne Heaton
- Gerd Larsen
- Gillian Lynne
- Rosemary Lindsay
- Anne Negus
- Lorna Mossford
- Jill Gregory
- Nadia Nerina
- Jean Stokes

== Critical reception ==
Initially, Scènes de ballet divided critical opinion. The Times commented that it "had the one merit of brevity"; Richard Buckle in The Observer wrote, "The only fault … is that it is not the last act of a long classical ballet. Such a display of noble movement should be the culmination of a spectacle: yet before we realise its beauty this pearl of great price has dissolved – in eighteen minutes." Ashton's own description of the ballet was,"It has a distant, uncompromising beauty which says I am here, beautiful, but I will make no effort to charm you." In 2004 Debra Crain called the work "pure classicism at its most invigorating."

== Recording ==
A performance of Scènes de ballet by the Royal Ballet from December 2010, featuring Miyako Yoshida, Ivan Putrov, Edward Watson and Lauren Cuthbertson has been issued on DVD by Opus Arte, as part of an all Ashton programme.

== See also ==
- List of ballets by title
