= David Bintley =

English former ballet dancer

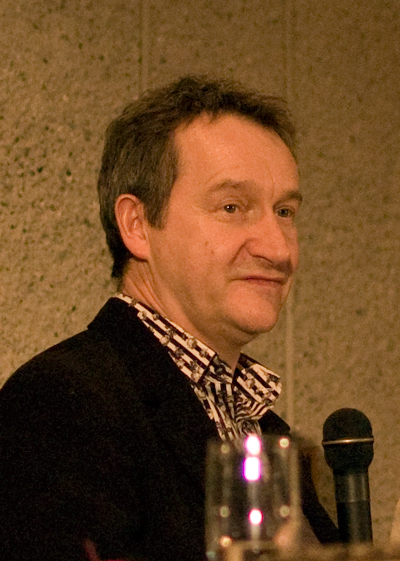
David Bintley, 2010

Sir David Julian Bintley CBE (born 17 September 1957) is an English former ballet dancer, the artistic director of the Birmingham Royal Ballet, and co-artistic director of the New National Theatre Tokyo ballet company.

== Early life ==
Bintley was born in Huddersfield, England. He trained professionally in classical ballet at the Royal Ballet School in London. While training at the school, some of his choreography was seen by Sir Frederick Ashton, founder choreographer and artistic director of The Royal Ballet.

== Career ==
In 1976, Bintley was offered a contract to dance with the Sadler's Wells Theatre Ballet, now the Birmingham Royal Ballet (BRB). He received his first commission as a choreographer in 1978, creating the ballet The Outsider for that company. Later in 1985, he was appointed resident choreographer of The Royal Ballet at the Royal Opera House in Covent Garden. He appeared on Larry Grayson's Generation Game performing 'The Clog Dance.' He has subsequently created numerous works for the Royal Ballet, the BRB and as an international guest choreographer. In 1995, he succeeded Sir Peter Wright as artistic director of the BRB. In March 2018 he announced his plan to retire from the BRB at the end of July 2019. In his time he choreographed at least ten full-length and 12 one-act ballets for the BRB and commissioned a further 21 ballets by other choreographers. He is succeeded by Carlos Acosta.

== Honours and awards ==
Bintley was appointed Commander of the Order of the British Empire (CBE) in the 2001 Birthday Honours and was knighted in the 2020 New Year Honours, both for services to dance.

In January 2015, he received an honorary doctorate from the University of Warwick.

== Major productions ==
- Still Life at the Penguin Cafe (1988)
- Hobson's Choice (1989)
- Edward II (1995)
- Carmina Burana (1995)
- Far from the Madding Crowd (1997)
- Nutcracker Sweeties (1997)
- Beauty and the Beast (2003)
- Cyrano (2007)
- E=mc² (2009)
- Cinderella (2010)
- Aladdin (2012)
- Faster (2012)
- Prince of the Pagodas (2014)
- The King Dances (2015)
- The Tempest (2016)
- A Comedy of Errors (2022)
