= Peter Wright (dancer) =

British dancer (born 1926)

Sir Peter Wright CBE
- Born: 25 November 1926 (age 99)
- Education: Leighton Park School; Bedales
- Occupations: Ballet dancer, choreographer, director
- Years active: 1940s–present
- Spouse: Sonya Hana (m. 1954; died 2007)

Sir Peter Wright CBE (born 25 November 1926) is a British ballet teacher, choreographer, director and former professional dancer. He worked as a choreographer and as the artistic director of Birmingham Royal Ballet, a classical ballet company based in Birmingham, England. On retiring from the company in 1995, he was bestowed the honorary title of director laureate of the company.

== Early life ==
As a child, Wright was educated at Leighton Park School and then went on to Bedales. At the age of 16, his mother took him to a performance of Les Sylphides by the International Ballet, and it was this experience that led him to pursue dance as a career. His father was an accountant and, being a Quaker, was also very religious. He did not approve of his only son wanting to pursue a career in dance, which led to Wright leaving both home and school at the age of 17.

== Career ==
After leaving home, Wright auditioned for Ninette de Valois, to join what is now the Royal Ballet School, but was rejected. He subsequently decided to accept an offer from the German choreographer Kurt Jooss to become an apprentice with his company "Ballets Jooss". He trained with the company for two years, dancing in many expressionist and modern dance works. Eventually, Wright decided he needed to train in classical ballet, so he returned to London to study with Vera Volkova, a leading teacher of the Vaganova method. He then re-auditioned for Ninette de Valois, who offered him a contract to dance with the Sadler's Wells Theatre Ballet, the predecessor of today's Birmingham Royal Ballet.

In 1955, de Valois gave Wright his first opportunity to direct, making him responsible for the formation of the Sadler's Wells Opera Ballet, a troupe of dancers who would perform the dances in the operas at the Sadler's Wells Opera company. Later in 1957, he received his first commission as a choreographer, creating the ballet A Blue Rose for the Sadler's Wells Theatre Ballet. In 1959, Wright was appointed as a teacher at the Royal Ballet School.

In 1961, Wright made a critical career decision, when he agreed to work for John Cranko, a former dancer and choreographer with the Sadler's Wells Ballet. Cranko had moved to Germany, where he established the Stuttgart Ballet as a world-class classical company. Wright joined the company as ballet master, teacher and choreographer, and would create several works for the company, including The Mirror Walkers, Namouna, Designs for Dancers, "The Great Peacock" and Quintet. It was also during his tenure at Stuttgart that he would direct his first seminal work, a production of Giselle that would lead to him becoming internationally renowned as a producer of the major classical repertory.

Wright's production of Giselle has subsequently been staged by the Royal Ballet, Birmingham Royal Ballet and almost all the international ballet companies. He would become particularly noted for his interpretations of the great length classical ballets, mounting The Sleeping Beauty, Coppelia and Swan Lake, which continue to be regularly performed internationally today. His most successful production is The Nutcracker, which in 2024 celebrated its 40th anniversary, and which continues to play each Christmas as of December 2025, when Wright appeared for the curtain call in a wheelchair days before his ninety-ninth birthday.

In 1969, Wright returned to the Royal Ballet as a member of the artistic staff, later being promoted to the post of associate director, working in partnership with Sir Kenneth MacMillan. MacMillan was the director and resident choreographer of the company and had been appointed by Dame Ninette de Valois. Wright would work closely with Macmillan for a number of years until 1977, when he was made artistic director of the Sadler's Wells Royal Ballet, which was the name for Birmingham Royal Ballet at that time.

It was Wright who led the company when it relocated to Birmingham in 1990, when the current name of Birmingham Royal Ballet was adopted. Wright served as the company's artistic director until his retirement in 1995, when David Bintley was appointed artistic director.

== Awards ==
- 1981 – Evening Standard Award for Ballet
- 1985 – Commander of the Order of the British Empire (CBE)
- 1990 – Honorary Doctorate of Music (DMus) from the University of London
- 1990 – Appointed Special Professor of Performance Studies, University of Birmingham
- 1990 – Elizabeth II Coronation Award, Royal Academy of Dance
- 1991 – Honorary Fellowship, Birmingham School of Music (FBSM)
- 1991 – Digital Premier Award
- 1993 – Knighted by Queen Elizabeth II
- 1994 – Honorary Doctorate of Letters (DLitt) from University of Birmingham
- 1995 – Appointed honorary director laureate of Birmingham Royal Ballet upon retirement as artistic director
