= Espinosa (surname) =

Espinosa or Espinoza is a Spanish and Portuguese surname.

Notable people with the surname include:

== People ==
=== Espinosa ===
- Abe Espinosa (1889–1980), American golfer
- Al Espinosa (1891–1957), American golfer
- Albert Espinosa (born 1973), Spanish writer and actor
- Alonso de Espinosa (1543-?), Spanish priest and historian
- Andrés Espinosa (born 1963), Mexican runner
- Angel Espinosa (1966–2017), Cuban boxer
- Ángela María Espinosa (born 1974), Colombian fencer
- Antonio Castejón Espinosa (1896–1969), Spanish army officer
- Antonio Vázquez de Espinosa (died 1630), Spanish friar
- Aurelio Macedonio Espinosa Jr. (1907–2004), American academic
- Aurelio Macedonio Espinosa Sr. (1880–1958), American academic
- Bernardo Espinosa (born 1989), Colombian footballer
- Bobby Espinosa (1949–2010), American musician
- Carlos Espinosa (born 1982), Chilean footballer
- Carmen E. Espinosa, American judge
- Carolina Espinosa, Ecuadorian equestrian
- Celedonio Espinosa, Filipino boxer
- Chris Espinosa (born 1961), senior employee of Apple Inc
- Daniel Espinosa (born 1977), Swedish film director
- Daniela Espinosa (born 1999), Mexican footballer
- Danny Espinosa (born 1987), American baseball player
- Eden Espinosa (born 1978), American singer and stage actress
- Edouard Espinosa (1871–1950), British dancer
- Eliécer Espinosa (born 1996), Colombian footballer
- Elvira Espinosa (born 2009), Ecuadorian swimmer
- Emmanuel Espinosa (born 1975), Mexican musician
- Erik Espinosa (born 1980), Mexican footballer
- Esteban Espinosa (born 1962), Ecuadorian cyclist
- Esteban Robles Espinosa (died 2008), Mexican police officer
- Eugenio de Espinosa, Spanish soldier
- Fabio Espinosa (born 1948), Colombian footballer
- Facundo Espinosa (born 1980), Argentine actor
- Felipe Espinosa (c. 1826–1863), Mexican-American murderer
- Fermin Espinosa (born 1940), Cuban boxer
- Francisco Espinosa (disambiguation), multiple people
- Gabriel Arellano Espinosa, Mexican politician
- Gabriel de Espinosa (died 1595), Spanish criminal
- Gabriel Espinosa (born 1985), Ecuadorian footballer
- Gaspar de Espinosa (1484–1537), Spanish explorer and politician
- Helena Espinosa Berea (ca. 1895 – ca. 1960), Mexican academic
- Hernán Espinosa (1916–1991), Spanish equestrian
- Isidro de Espinosa (1697–1755), Spanish missionary
- Jerónimo Jacinto de Espinosa (1600–1667), Spanish painter
- Jesús María Espinosa (1908–1995), Colombian painter
- Jordan Espinosa (born 1989), American mixed martial artist
- José Miguel Espinosa (born 1945), Spanish swimmer
- José Roberto Espinosa (1948–2007), Mexican sports commentator
- Juan Bautista de Espinosa (1590–1641), Spanish painter
- Juan de Espinosa Medrano (ca. 1629–1688), Peruvian cleric
- Juan de Espinosa, Spanish painter
- Juan Javier Espinosa (1815–1870), Ecuadorian politician
- Juan Pablo Espinosa (born 1980), Colombian actor
- Júlio Espinosa (1951–2022), Brazilian football manager
- Julio García Espinosa (1926–2016), Cuban film director
- Léon Espinosa (1825–1903), Dutch dancer
- Leonor Espinosa, Colombian chef
- Lisandra Espinosa (born 1986), Cuban handball player
- Lodovico Espinosa (1926–2006), Filipino sports shooter
- Luis Espinosa (born 1967), Colombian cyclist
- Luisito Espinosa (born 1967), Filipino boxer
- Manrique Espinosa (born 2002), Bolivian footballer
- Manuel Espinosa (1912–2006), Argentine painter
- Maria Espinosa (born 1939), American author
- María Fernanda Espinosa (born 1964), Ecuadorian politician and diplomat
- Mariana Espinosa (born 1984), Ecuadorian footballer
- Marianne Espinosa, American judge
- Maricet Espinosa (born 1990), Cuban judoka
- Mariel Espinosa (born 1987), Mexican athlete
- Mason Espinosa, American football player
- Mauricio Espinosa (born 1972), Uruguayan football referee
- Mayte Espinosa, Spanish athlete
- Michel Espinosa (born 1993), French-Cameroonian footballer
- Neri Espinosa (born 1986), Argentine footballer
- Nicolás Pacheco (born 1994), Peruvian sport shooter
- Nino Espinosa (1959–1987), Dominican baseball player
- Omar Espinosa, American musician
- Oscar Espinosa (disambiguation), multiple people
- Pablo Espinosa (born 1992), Spanish actor and musician
- Paola Espinosa (born 1985), Mexican diver
- Patricia Espinosa (born 1958), Mexican politician and diplomat
- Paul Espinosa, American politician
- Randy Espinosa (born 1988), Guamanian footballer
- Rebeca Espinosa (born 1992), Panamanian footballer
- Renato Espinosa (born 1998), Peruvian footballer
- Roberto Espinosa (born 1959), Cuban footballer
- Rod Espinosa, Filipino comic book writer and artist
- Rolando Espinosa (1950–2016), Filipino politician and convicted criminal
- Rubén Espinosa (1983–2015), Mexican photographer and journalist
- Salvador Espinosa (born 1956), Mexican filmmaker
- Sid Espinosa (born 1972), American businessman and politician
- Sílvia Soler Espinosa (born 1987), Spanish tennis player
- Sofía Espinosa (born 1989), Mexican actress and director
- Sonsoles Espinosa (born 1961), Spanish musician
- Valdir Espinosa (1947–2020), Brazilian football manager
- Veronica Espinosa, Ecuadorian doctor
- Yaniuska Espinosa (born 1986), Venezuelan weightlifter
- Yvette Espinosa (1911–1992), English ballerina

=== Espinoza ===
- Álvaro Espinoza (born 1962), Venezuelan baseball player
- Anagabriela Espinoza (born 1988), Mexican model and beauty queen
- Anderson Espinoza (born 1998), Venezuelan baseball player
- Cristian Espinoza (born 1995), Argentine footballer
- Fernando Espinoza (disambiguation), multiple people
- Giovanny Espinoza (born 1977), Ecuadorian footballer
- Javier Espinoza, Peruvian politician
- José Ángel Espinoza (1919–2015), Mexican musician and actor
- Joshua Jennifer Espinoza (born 1987), American poet
- Maribel Espinoza (born 1959), Honduran lawyer and politician
- Nicolás Espinoza (1795–1845), Salvadoran general
- Plácida Espinoza (born 1948) Bolivian politician
- Roger Espinoza (born 1986), Honduran footballer
- Rubén Espinoza (born 1961), Chilean footballer
- Vanessa Solari Espinoza (born 1982), Multi-dimensional artist

== Fictional characters ==
- Angelo Espinosa, also known as Skin, Marvel Comics character
- Anna Espinosa, character in Alias
- Antonio Espinosa, character in Italian television series La piovra
- Carla Espinosa, character in Scrubs
- Daniel “Dan” Espinoza, character from Lucifer
- Gabriella Carlita Espinosa, character from Big City Greens
- Julio Espinosa, character from Spanish television series Gran Hotel
- Manuel Espinoza, character from 2666
- Oscar Espinosa, character from video game Just Cause 4
- Rosita Espinosa, character from The Walking Dead franchise
- Santos Espinosa, character from Far Cry 6
