= East Sheen Cemetery =

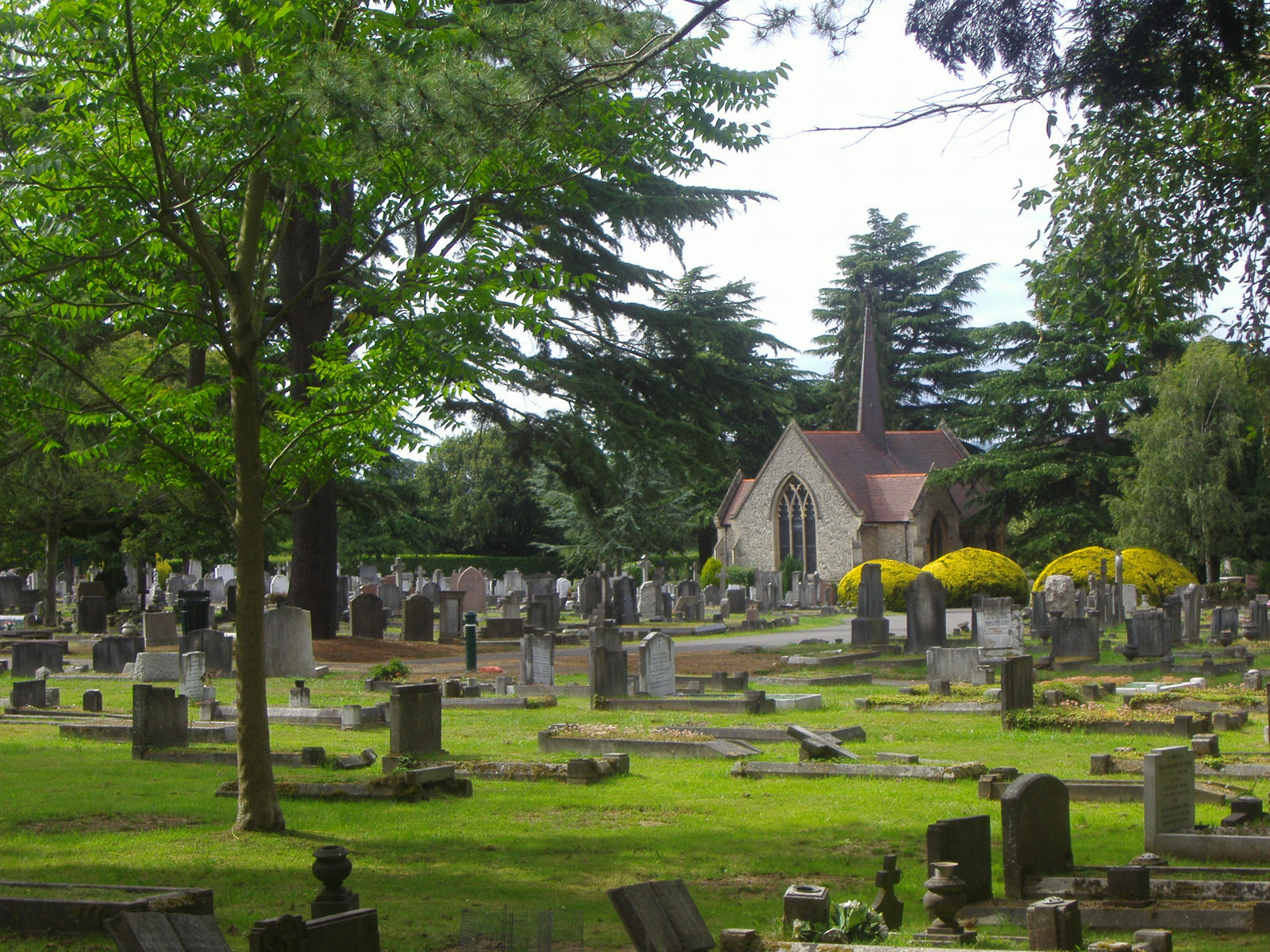
- East Sheen Cemetery and chapel
- Interactive map of East Sheen Cemetery

Details
- Established: 1906
- Location: East Sheen, London Borough of Richmond upon Thames, TW10 5BJ
- Country: England
- Coordinates: 51°27′29″N 0°17′03″W
- Type: Active
- Owned by: Richmond upon Thames London Borough Council
- Size: 16 acres (6.5 hectares)
- Website: www.richmond.gov.uk/east_sheen_cemetery

East Sheen Cemetery Chapel
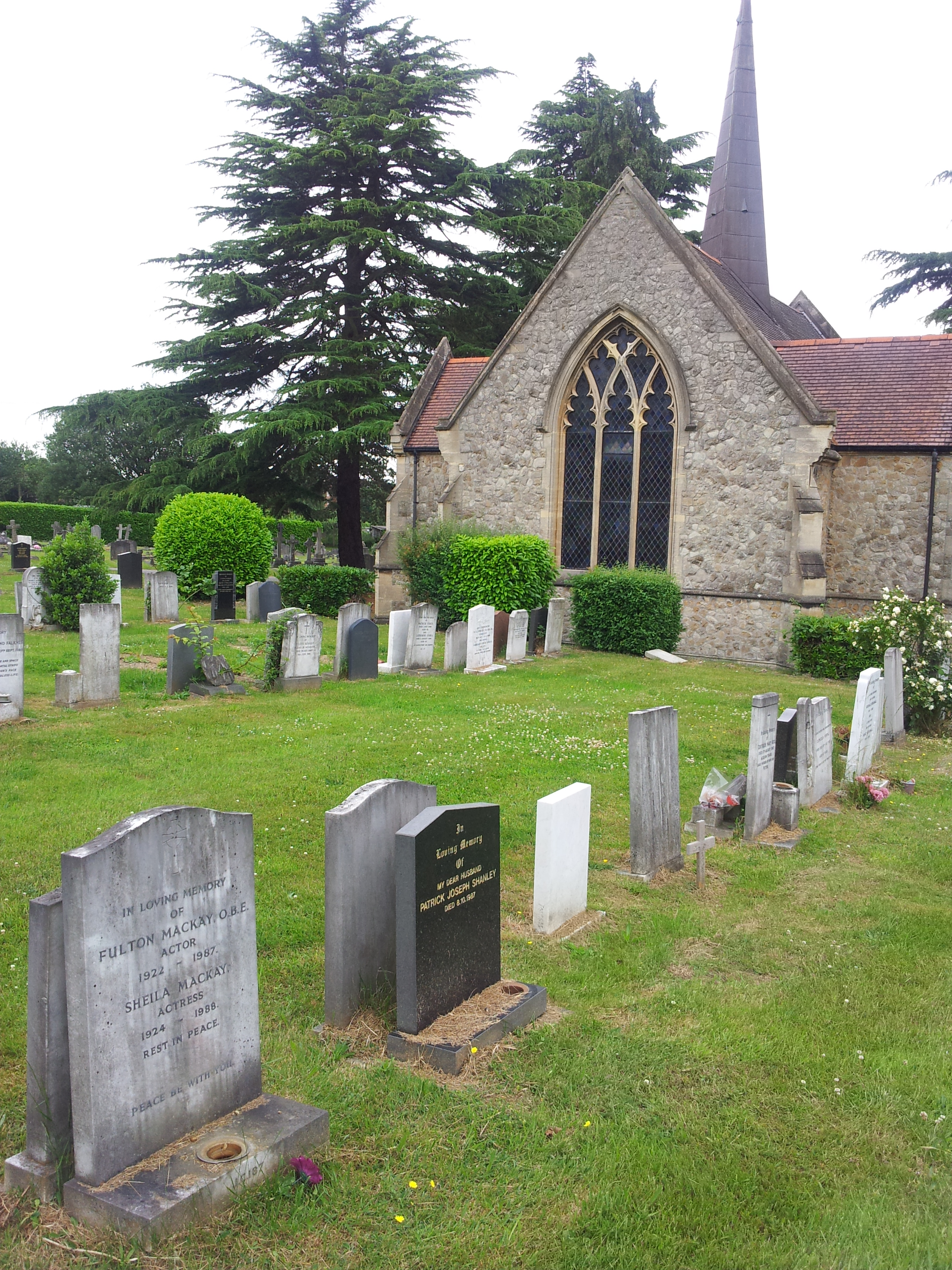
- Fulton Mackay's grave and the cemetery's chapel
- East Sheen Cemetery Chapel
- OS grid reference: TQ 19293 74645

History
- Founded: 1906
- Founder: Barnes Urban District Council

Architecture
- Architect: Reginald Rowell
- Style: 14th-century style

Listed Building – Grade II
- Designated: 5 March 2015
- Reference no.: 1194022

East Sheen Cemetery, originally known as Barnes Cemetery, is a cemetery on Sheen Road in East Sheen in the London Borough of Richmond upon Thames, England. The cemetery opened in 1906 on what was previously woodland in a rural area of Surrey. Originally, only half the site was given over for burials while the other half was maintained as a nursery before it was converted in the 1930s and the whole site was renamed East Sheen Cemetery. It is today contiguous with Richmond Cemetery, though the original boundary is marked by a hedge. The cemetery's chapel is used for services by both sites, as Richmond Cemetery's chapel is no longer in use as such. The chapel was built in 1906 in the Gothic revival style by local architect Reginald Rowell, who was himself later buried in the cemetery.

Many prominent people are buried in the cemetery, which contains several significant memorials. The most important monument in the cemetery is the memorial to George William Lancaster and his partner (who lived as his wife) by Sydney March — a bronze sculpture of an angel weeping over a stone sarcophagus dating from the 1920s, which is considered to be one of the most important sculptures of its type from the 20th century. Also significant are the memorial to Markham Buxton, a bronze relief on a stone stele by his son Alfred; a miniature walled garden commemorating Edouard Espinosa and his wife Eve Louise Kelland; and several other sculptures, both Christian-themed and secular. The cemetery also contains over 70 war graves, cared for by the Commonwealth War Graves Commission.

== History and setting ==
The cemetery, on a 16-acre (6.5-hectare) site, was first opened as Barnes Cemetery in 1905 or 1906, prior to which the area was woodland. The land in the area was historically owned by King George III. Only the northern half of the site was originally for burials, with the southern half used as a nursery. The southern area was converted into a cemetery in the 1930s and the whole site was renamed East Sheen Cemetery.

It was originally administered by the Municipal Borough of Barnes, with the adjacent Richmond Cemetery being administered by the Municipal Borough of Richmond (Surrey). Since 1965, when both boroughs joined the Municipal Borough of Twickenham to form the London Borough of Richmond upon Thames, the two cemeteries have been administered by Richmond upon Thames London Borough Council. The entrance to the cemetery is set back from the road along an avenue flanked by trees and behind a pair of brick gate piers; an entrance described at resembling the entrance to a country house. An air-raid shelter was built near the entrance during the Second World War. Although East Sheen and Richmond cemeteries are today contiguous, the original boundary is still clearly visible and is marked by a holly hedge.

The cemetery contains a chapel, available for people of all faiths and beliefs, which is used for services by both East Sheen and Richmond cemeteries as the latter's is no longer in use. It was designed by Reginald Rowell, a local architect who is buried in the cemetery. The chapel, which is listed Grade II by Historic England, was constructed in 1906, but was designed in 13th-century Gothic style with a slender flèche.

East Sheen Cemetery enjoys protected status as a result of designation as Metropolitan Open Land and (jointly with Richmond Cemetery and Pesthouse Common) as a conservation area.

== Memorials ==
=== Lancaster Memorial ===
East Sheen Cemetery contains several particularly noticeable memorials, the best-known of which is the Lancaster Memorial. It is dedicated to George William Lancaster, who died in January 1920, and his partner Louisa Mary, who was not married to Lancaster but took his surname and who died in 1922. Originally from the north of England, the Lancasters were industrialists who made their fortune in coal mining. The memorial is described by historian Hugh Meller as "arguably the most dramatic sculpture in any of London's cemeteries", eclipsing all other monuments in the cemetery. The Lancaster Memorial was designated a Grade II* listed building in 1992, and according to Historic England is "considered one of the most significant 20th-century examples of funerary sculpture". It consists of a bronze sculpture of an angel mourning over a rectangular sarcophagus, which rests on a coved base and a rectangular plinth, all of which are constructed of Portland stone. The fluidity of the figure and the drooping of the angel's wings over the sarcophagus are singled out by Historic England as particularly memorable features. The angel was sculpted by Sydney March, who was later renowned for the National War Memorial of Canada—also consisting of bronze and stone sculpture. The work is thought to be inspired by funerary sculptures by Leonardo Bistolfi in northern Italy.

=== Buxton Memorial ===
Also listed (at Grade II) is the memorial to Markham Buxton (1852–1927), a bronze relief on a stone stele; the memorial was built by Buxton's son, Alfred Buxton, a sculptor who exhibited at the Royal Academy. The stele is of granite construction, topped with five antefixae and standing on a granite base, which bears an inscription. The relief features a woman in classical dress playing a lyre; it is inscribed with the verse "OUR SWEETEST SONGS ARE THOSE WHICH TELL OF SADDEST THOUGHTS". Alfred exhibited a relief by the name of "Chanson Triste" at the Royal Academy in 1927, which is likely to be the same work that features on his father's grave.

=== War memorial ===
The cemetery contains a war memorial to 79 Commonwealth soldiers who died in the two world wars, 71 of whom have individual headstones—33 from the First World War and 38 from the Second World War. The graves are maintained by the Commonwealth War Graves Commission.

=== Other memorials ===
Other significant memorials in the cemetery include a marble sculpture of a soldier commemorating William Rennie O'Mahony (died 1928), a silver-painted wooden dolphin, a glass circular disc memorial and a sculpture of Jesus as the Good Shepherd and three lambs, and a mosaic of St Francis and Mary Magdalene on an illegible headstone.

Secular memorials include a carving of an aircraft on the grave of Royal Air Force Pilot Officer Denis Power (died 1931), a maritime-themed memorial on the Hervey grave (1917), and a miniature walled garden commemorating Louise Espinosa and her husband Edouard.

== Notable burials ==
Notable people buried in East Sheen Cemetery include:

- Clementina Black (1853–1922), writer, feminist and pioneering trade unionist
- Stephen Andrew Boyd, associate editor of The Sunday Times and compiler of the Sunday Times Rich List
- Robert Chalmers, 1st Baron Chalmers (1858–1938), civil servant and a Pali and Buddhist scholar who, in later life, served as the Master of Peterhouse, Cambridge
- William Gilbert Chaloner (1928–2016), palaeobotanist, who was Professor of Botany in the Earth Sciences Department at Royal Holloway, University of London, and visiting professor in Earth Sciences at University College, London
- Husband and wife Edouard Espinosa (1871–1950) and Eve Louise Kelland (1889–1943), founders of the British Ballet Organization, now bbodance
- Sir Alec Martin, businessman
- Sir Ralph Moor (1860–1909), diplomat
- Sir Benjamin Morgan, engineer and economist
- Sir Frederick Wigan, 1st Baronet (1827–1907), merchant and High Sheriff of Surrey. There is a monument to him at Southwark Cathedral.

The cemetery also has a grave containing remains of victims of the 2002 Bali bombings.

=== Actors and entertainers ===
- Roy Kinnear (1934–1988), actor
- Husband and wife Fulton Mackay (1922–1987), Scottish actor, best known for his role as prison officer Mr Mackay in the 1970s television sitcom Porridge, and Sheila Manahan (1924–1988), Irish actress, whose film roles were Ann Willingdon in Seven Days to Noon (1950), Esther's mother in The Story of Esther Costello (1957), and Mrs Jenkins in Only Two Can Play (1962)
- Sir John Martin-Harvey (1863–1944), actor
- William Ellsworth Robinson (stage name Chung Ling Soo), magician

=== Artists and sculptors ===
- Sir Miles de Montmorency, painter and art historian
- Ian Walters (1930–2006), sculptor, whose work included the statue in Huddersfield, West Yorkshire of Prime Minister Harold Wilson and a large head of Nelson Mandela, now outside the Royal Festival Hall, London

=== Soldiers ===
- Sir O'Moore Creagh (1848–1923), general and Victoria Cross recipient
- Arthur Donaldson, fighter pilot
- William Officer, major general and army doctor
- Hamilton Reed, major general and VC recipient
- Douglas Scott, major general and engineer
- Sir Michael Tighe, lieutenant-general

== Gallery ==
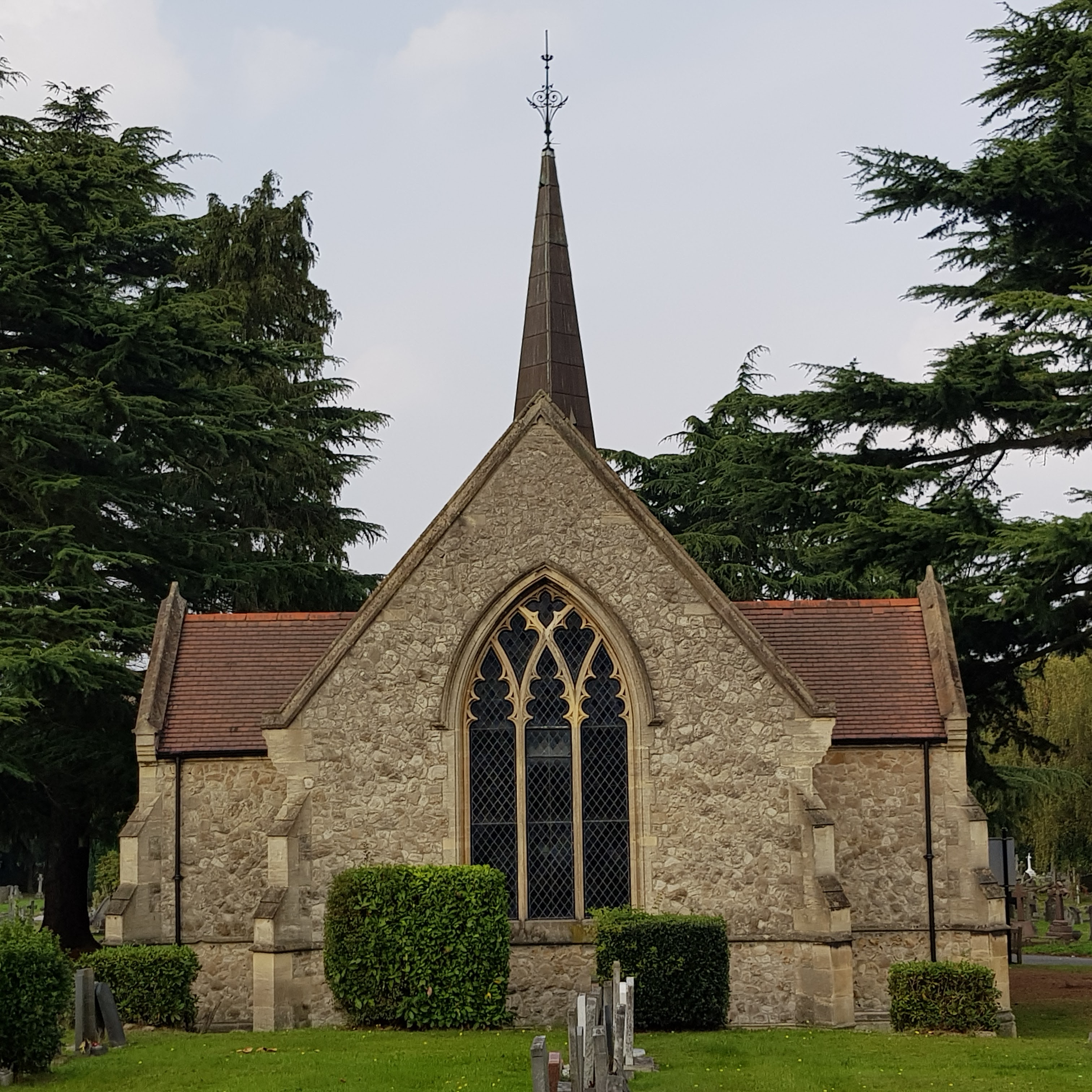
Chapel

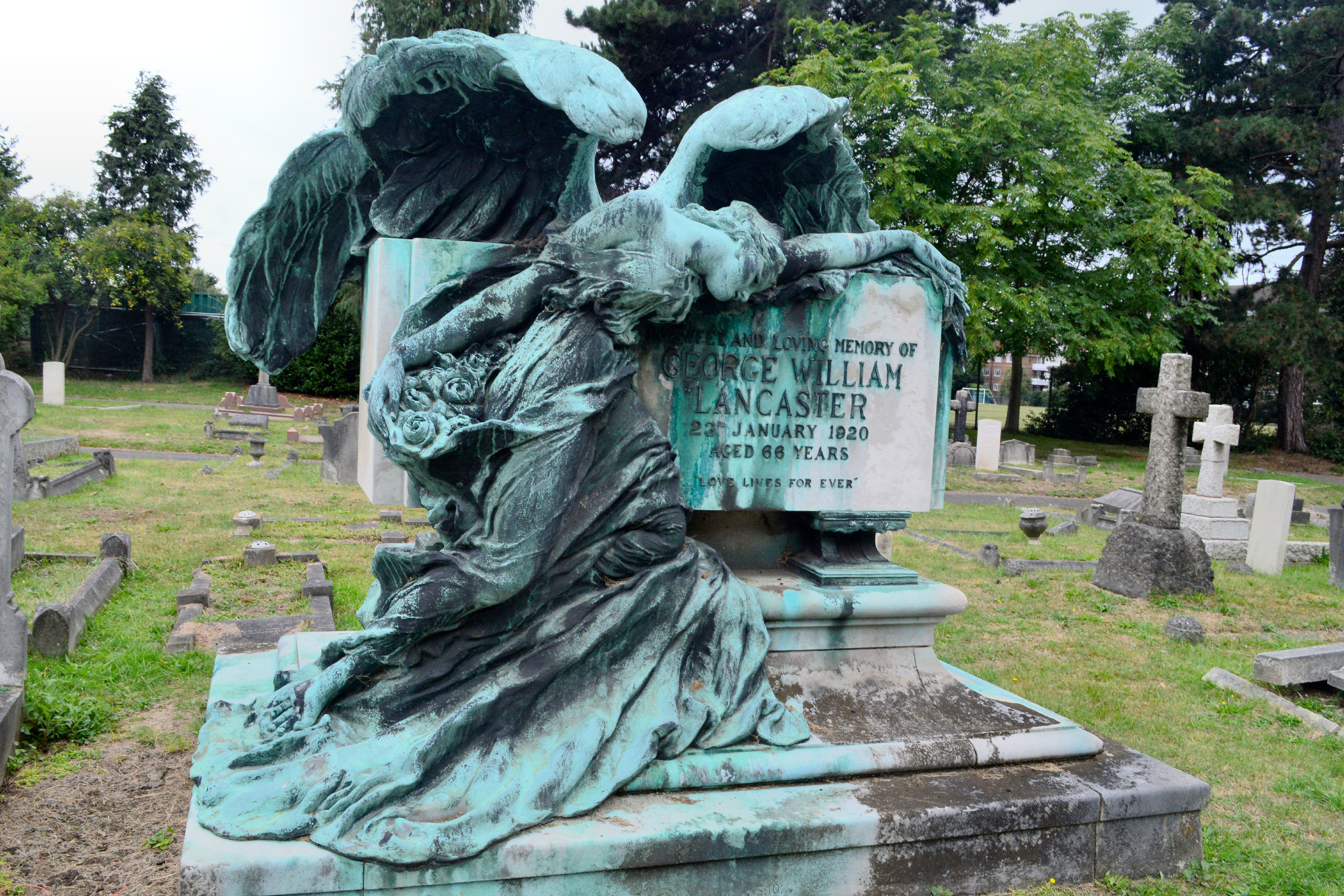
The Angel of Death, George William Lancaster Memorial by Sydney March

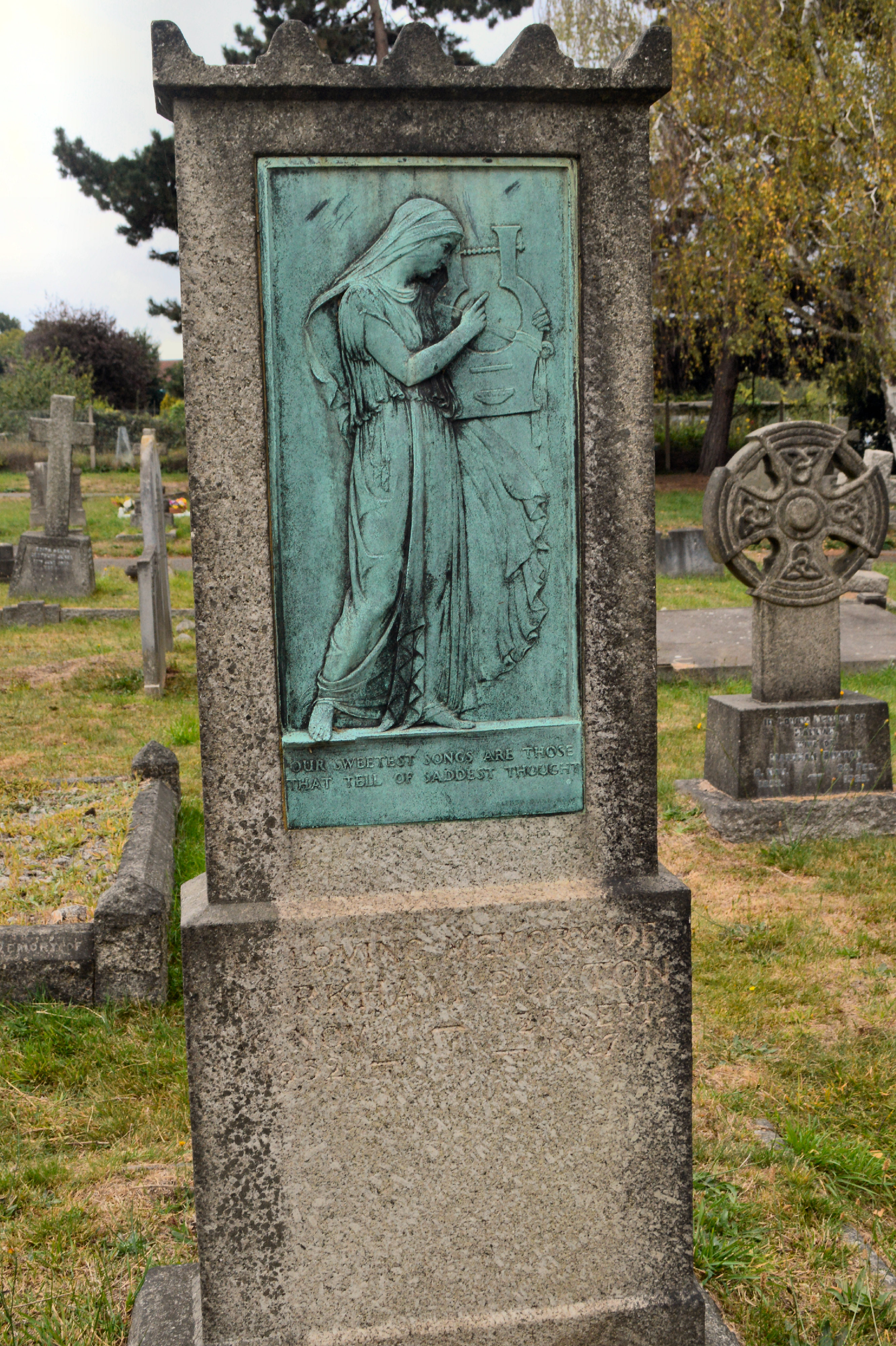
Markham Buxton memorial

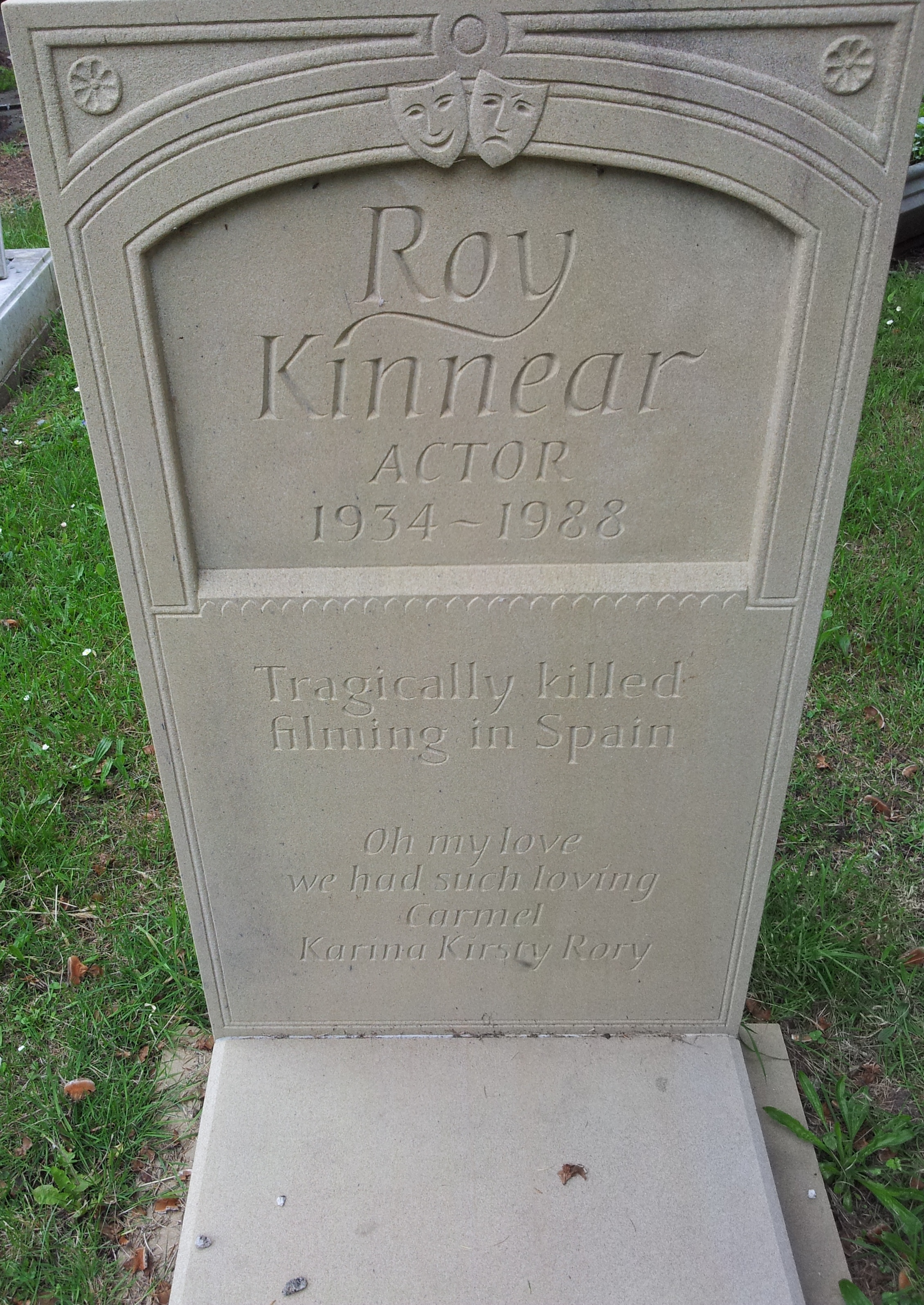
Grave of actor Roy Kinnear

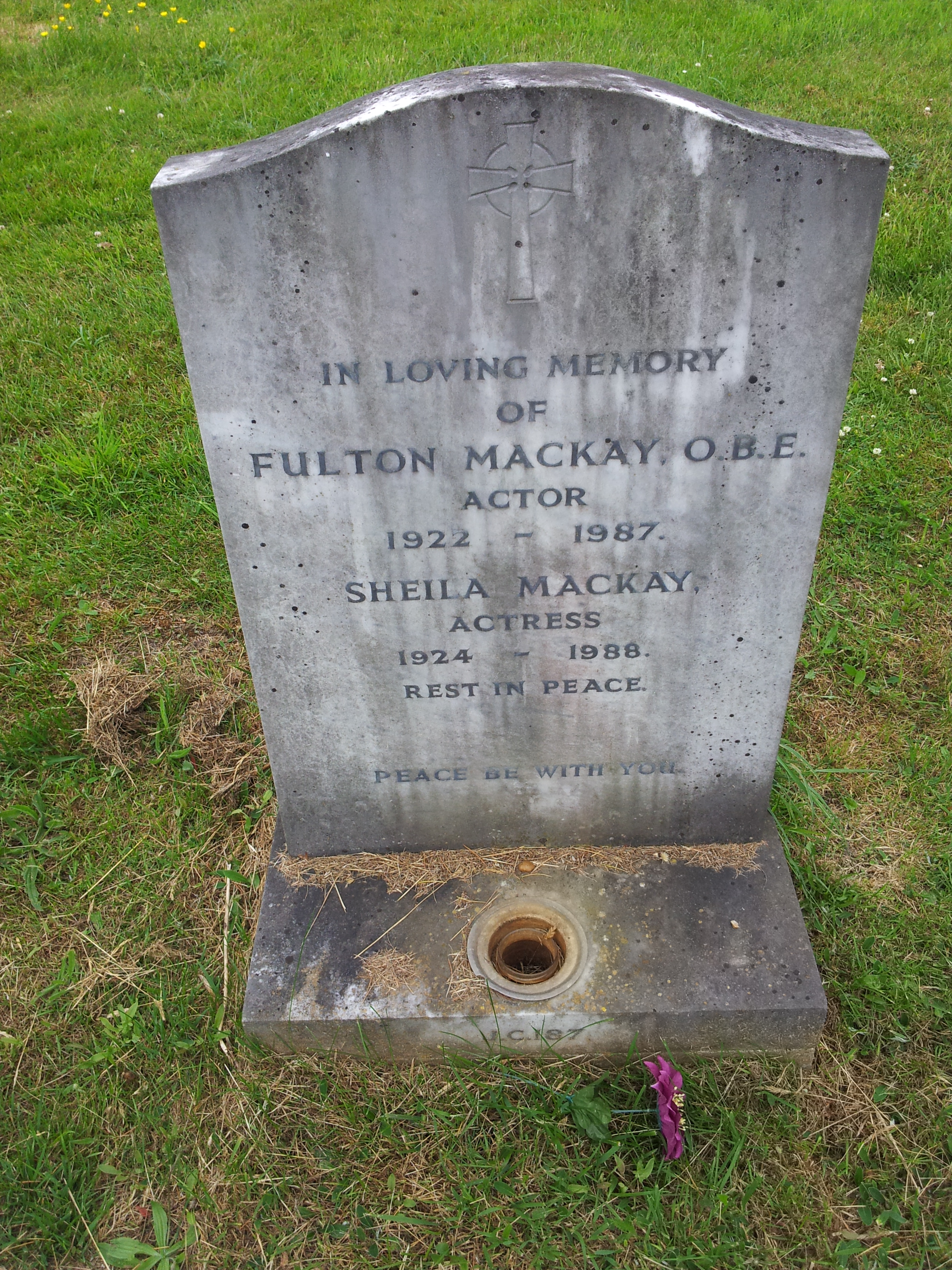
Grave of actor Fulton Mackay and his wife Sheila Manahan

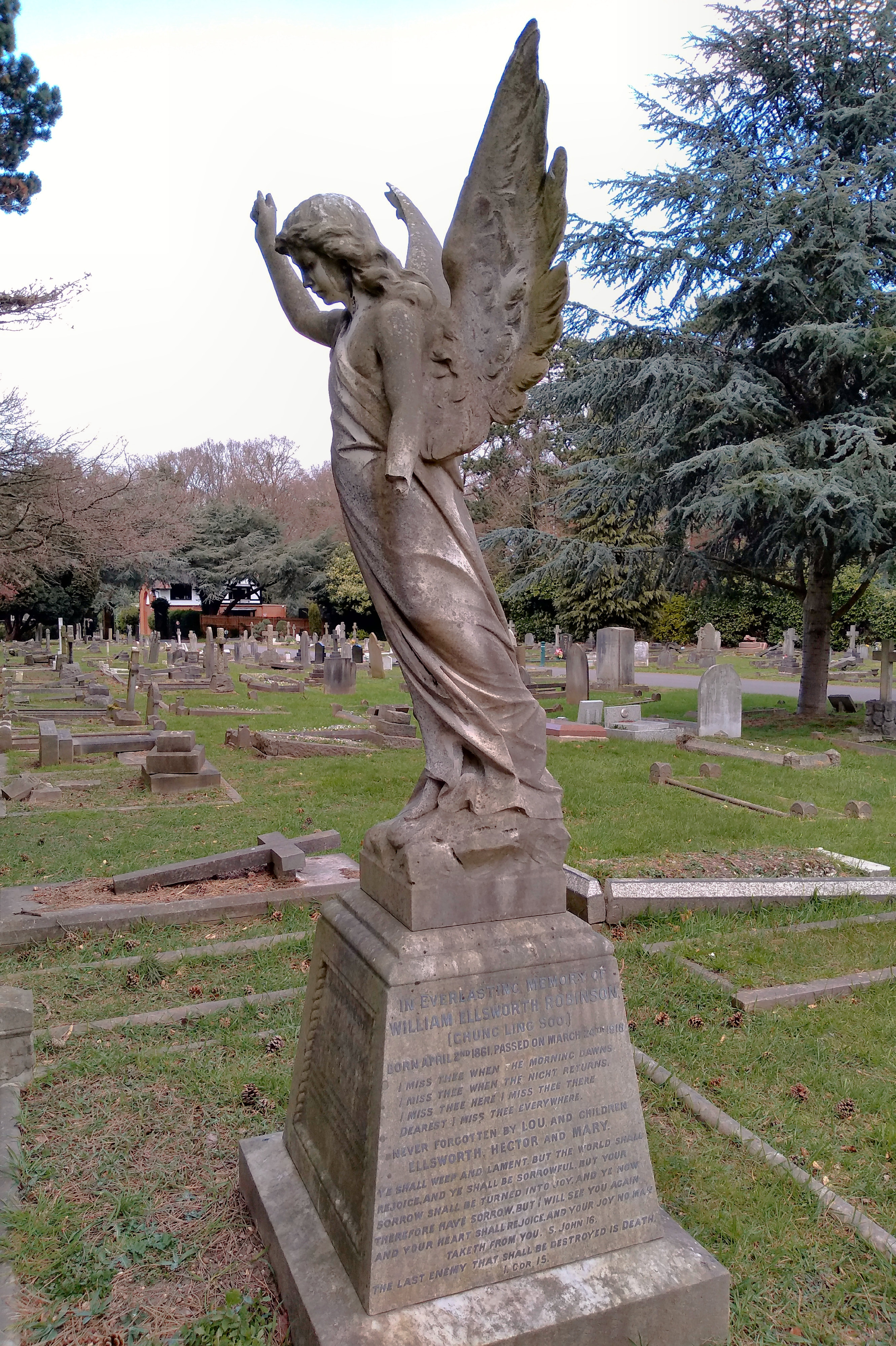
Grave of William Robinson (Chung Ling Soo)

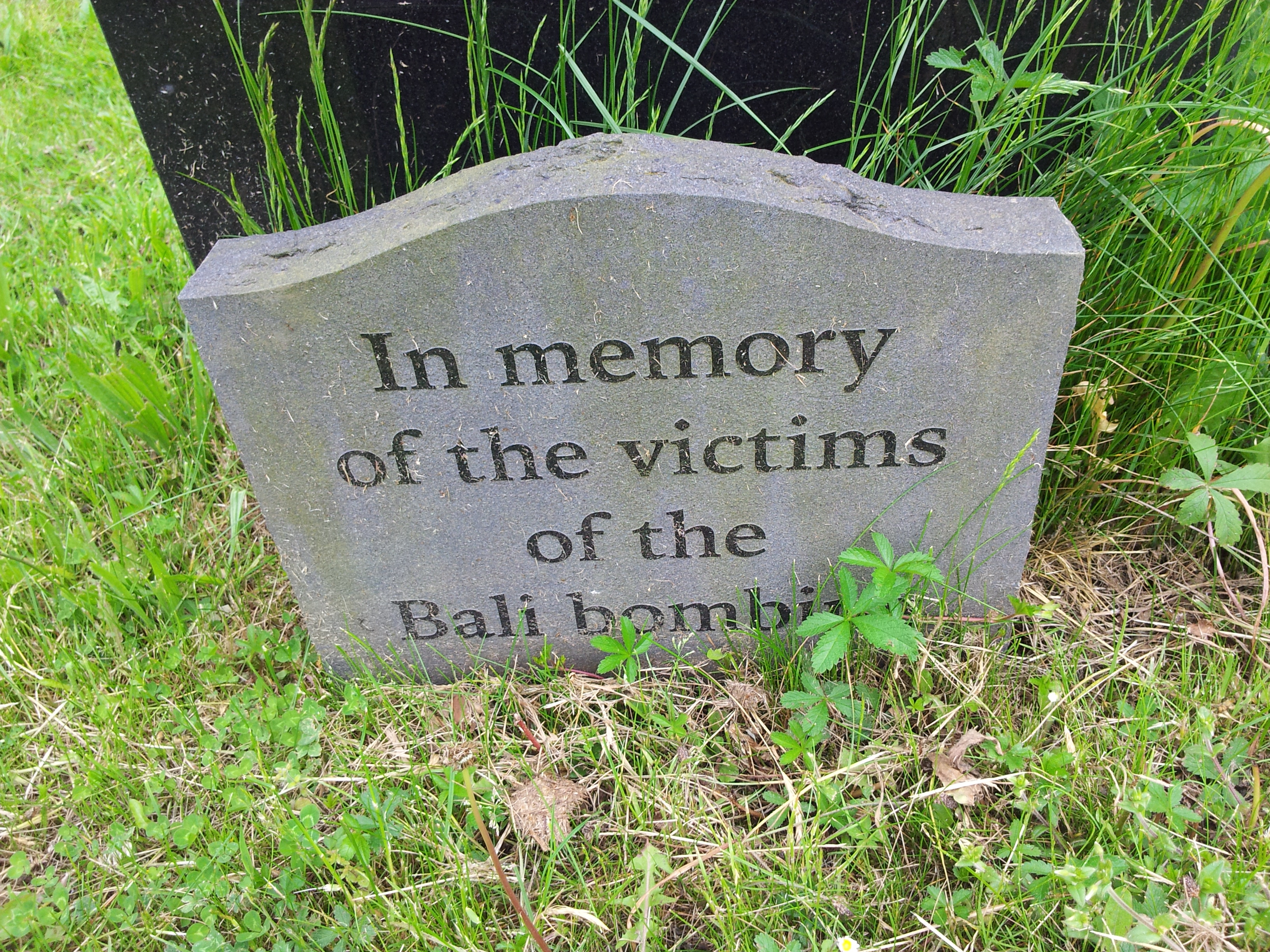
Grave containing remains of victims of the 2002 Bali bombings

== See also ==
- Barnes Cemetery
- Grove Gardens Chapel
- List of cemeteries in London
- Richmond Cemetery
