= Agana (disambiguation) =

Agana is the former name of Hagåtña, the capital of Guam.

Agana may also refer to:

== People ==
- Agana (actress), Indian actress
- Tessie Agana (born 1942), Filipino child star during the 1950s
- Tony Agana (born 1963), English former professional footballer
- Vanessa Solari Espinoza (born 1982), American artist also known as AGANA

== Other uses ==
- Agana race riot, took place at Agana, Guam (now Hagåtña) over the two nights of 24–25 December 1944
- Agana Heights, a village in Hagåtña, Guam
- Agana Historic District, in Hagåtña, Guam is a 2-acre (0.81 ha) historic district
- Agana Shopping Center, a shopping center located in downtown Hagåtña, Guam
- Agana Spanish Bridge, a stone arch bridge built in 1800 in Hagåtña, Guam (formerly known as Agana)
- Agana Airfield, another name for Antonio B. Won Pat International Airport in Hagåtña, Guam
