= Léon Espinosa =

Dutch-Spanish ballet dancer (1825–1904)

Léon Espinosa (1825–1904) was a Dutch-Spanish ballet dancer. He became the first in a long line of dancers and dance teachers, making the name Espinosa "recognised worldwide as one of the most important influences in the development of dance and training of dancers."

== Early life ==
Espinosa's early interest in dance was encouraged by a succession of outstanding teachers including Jean Coralli, Filippo Taglioni, and Jules Perrot during his time at the Paris Opéra Ballet.

== Personal life and Death ==
In 1825, Espinosa was born in The Hague, Holland to Spanish Jewish parents.

Espinosa married and had six children (Eduard, Marius, Leo, Judith, Ray, and Lea), all of whom became dancers and dance teachers.

Eduard married Eve Louise Kelland, with whom he had two children: Edward Kelland-Espinosa and Yvette Espinosa. Eduard became a Maître de Ballet for the Royal Opera House, Covent Garden, Empire Theatre, and Alhambra Theatre. He also established the Association for Operatic Dancing (later the Royal Academy of Dance), as well as the British Ballet Organization.

Judith "performed as prima ballerina at Alhambra Theater, London, under Carlo Coppi."

Both Judith and Lea ran ballet schools in London and overseas. They also served as major examiners for the Royal Academy of Dance.

Espinosa died in 1904.

== Career ==
Espinosa trained at the Paris Opera Ballet school and danced at the Théâtre de la Porte-Saint-Martin. After touring the United States, he joined the Bolshoi Ballet in Moscow as premier danseur de contrast and worked with Marius Petipa. While in Russia, he also danced with the Imperial Maryinsky Theatre.

In 1872, Espinosa moved to London where he continued to dance and eventually opened a dance school.

== Bibliography ==
- Espinosa, Leon (1977). The Encyclopedia of Dance & Ballet. London: Pitman Publishing. ISBN 0-907408-63-X.
- Espinosa, Leon (1981). World Ballet. London: Albany Books. LCCN 81-80489.
