= Madame Ravodna =

Ballet teacher

Madame Ravodna (1885 - 12 November 1934) was a French-born ballet teacher and member of the Espinosa family.

== Early life ==
Madame Ravodna, formerly known as Rae Espinosa but born Rachel de Leon Espinosa, was born in Paris in 1885 to Spanish Jewish parents. Her father, Léon Espinosa, and the rest of her family were dancers. Ravodna was trained by her mother in the French school and her mother also chaperoned her when Ravodna danced on tour in many countries. After her father's injury stopped him from dancing, the Espinosa children became the family's financial support. Ravodna had three brothers (Eduouard, Marius and Leo) and two sisters (Judith and Lea).

== Career ==
Ravodna and her brother Edouard visited South Africa in 1917, where Ravodna met Jack Schulman and elected to remain in Johannesburg. Some years later she opened her own ballet studio in the city. Ravodna had been classically trained in the French, Italian and Russian styles and taught according to the standards laid out by Edouard Espinosa in his textbook that became the foundation stone of the Association of Operatic Dancing of Great Britain (which later became the Royal Academy of Dancing). She trained a number of notable South African teachers including Marjorie Sturman, Poppy Frames, Madge Mann, Pearl Adler, Poppins Salomon and Ivy Conmee. She became the first chairwoman of the Johannesburg Dance Teachers' Association in 1923. She was also president of the SA Dance Teachers' Association (Transvaal Centre).

== Personal life ==
Ravodna married Jack Schulman on 14 March 1918 in Johannesburg. She suffered from ill health for a number of years and was diagnosed with cancer. She died suddenly on 12 November 1934 in Johannesburg, with cause of death listed as a fractured skull. She was survived by two children.
