= Guam Institute =

- U.S. National Register of Historic Places
- U.S. Historic district – Contributing property
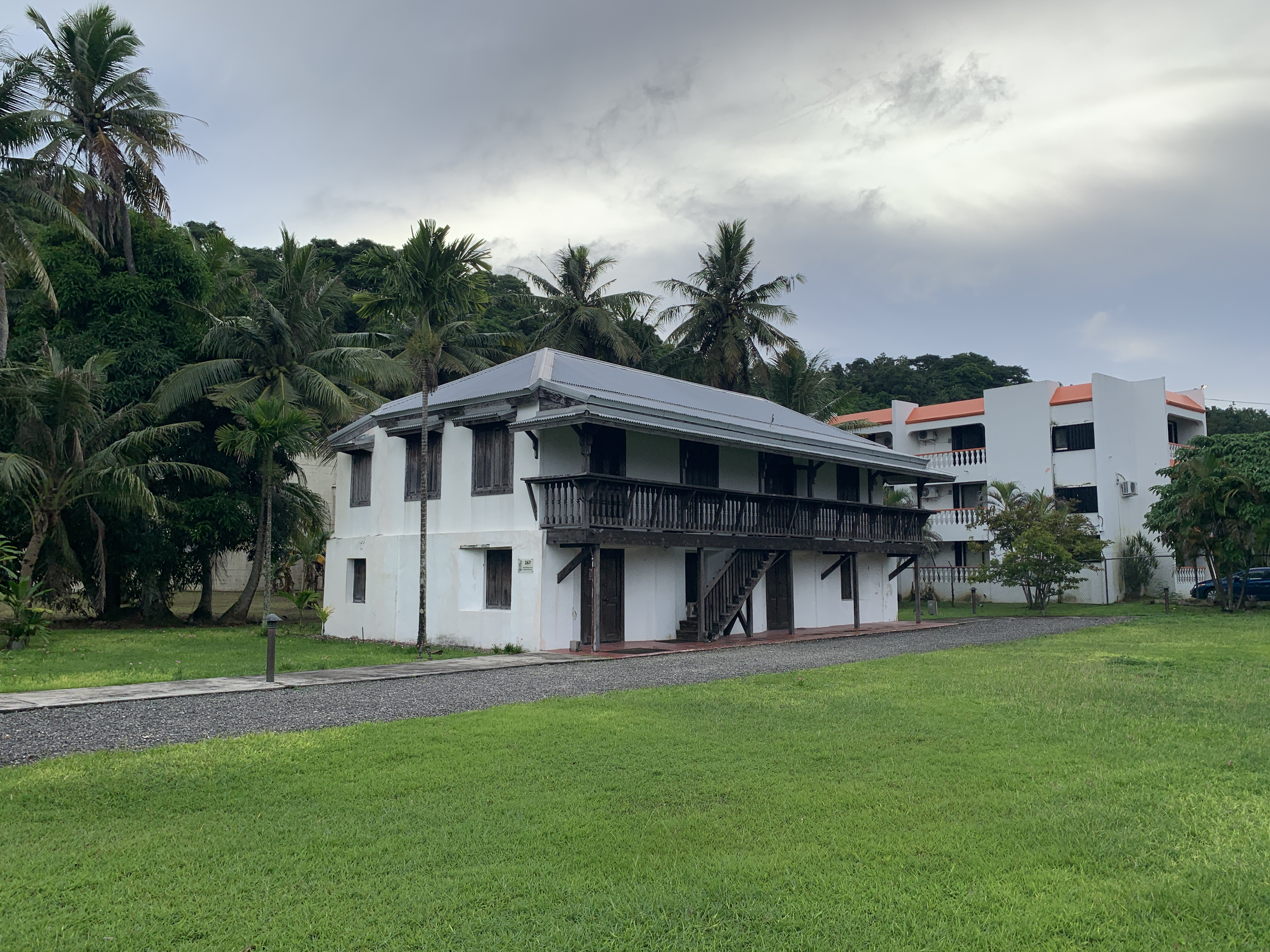

- Location within Guam
- Location: Off Guam Highway 1, Hagåtña, Guam
- Coordinates: 13°28′26″N 144°44′44″E
- Area: 0.3 acres (0.12 ha)
- Built: 1911
- Built by: Lujan, P. Jose
- Part of: Agana Historic District (ID85000495)
- NRHP reference No.: 77001568

Significant dates
- Added to NRHP: October 6, 1977
- Designated CP: February 8, 1985

The Guam Institute, located off in Guam Highway 1 in Hagåtña (formerly Agana or Agaña), Guam, was listed on the U.S. National Register of Historic Places in 1977; the listing included one contributing building. It was built in 1911. It has also been known as the Jose P. Lujan House.

The house is significant as one of few houses in Agana surviving from before World War II. It was built by carpenter and cabinet-maker Jose Pangelinan Lujan, who rented the house and later lived in it, until moving out of the house in 1928. Lujan owned the house until 1969.

The house was the location of the Guam Institute, "the only successful private school of the pre-war period" in Guam, from 1928 until the institute was closed in December, 1941, with the Japanese invasion.

The house was damaged by Typhoon Pamela in 1976; photos in 1977 showed it in poor condition.

However, supported by the NRHP listing, the owner obtained Federal matching grant funds to support rehabilitation of the building during 1980–1982. Work done used "design, materials (ifil wood), and workmanship to maintain the original character of the building."

It is one of five pre-World War II houses that make up the NRHP-listed Agana Historic District.

== See also ==
- National Register of Historic Places listings in Guam
