= California Scholarship Federation =

Student recognition organization in California, US

- CSF
- Founded: September 1921; 104 years ago Los Angeles, California, US
- Type: Honor
- Affiliation: Independent
- Status: Active
- Emphasis: Secondary schools
- Scope: Statewide (California)
- Chapters: 1,000+
- Headquarters: 28241 Crown Valley Parkway, Suite F 201; Laguna Niguel, California 92677; United States
- Website: csf-cjsf.org

The California Scholarship Federation (CSF) is a nonprofit organization that recognizes the academic achievement of highs school students living in the state of California. It was established in 1921 and has chapters at more than 1,000 schools.

== History ==
The California Scholarship Federation (CSF) was established as the culmination of four years of work by Charles F. Seymour. Seymour was head of the Long Beach Polytechnic High School social sciences department and oversaw the school's honor society. The federation's purpose was to "foster a higher standard of scholarship and all-around attainment among the students of the high schools in California". Seymour served as the society's temporary president and also drafted the organization's constitution.

Its founding meeting was held on September 26, 1921 was attended by representatives of twenty high schools in Southern California at the Los Angeles YMCA in Los Angeles, California. These comprised the majority of the high schools in California that had local honor societies. These charter members included Abraham Lincoln High School, Anaheim High School, Bakersfield High School, Burbank High School, Chaffee Union High School, Fullerton High School, Hemet High School, Hollywood High School, Huntington Park High School, Inglewood High School, Jefferson High School, Lomita High School, Long Beach Polytechnic High School, Los Angeles High School, Monrovia High School, Owensmouth High School, Pasadena High School, Puente High School, Santa Ana High School, San Fernando High School, Santa Barbara High School, and Venice High School.

The CSF constitution was ratified on October 15, 1921. By November 1921, Santa Maria Union High School had also joined the organization. This brought the founding chapters up to 21 when CSF was chartered on November 15, 1921. Each school established a CSF chapter for students. Its initial class of members included 300 students. Other chapter followed, including Taft Union High School in December 1921, formed for the preexisting Crescat Scientia local honor society.

In 1925, CSF negotiated scholarships for its members with several colleges and universities. CSF held its first annual convention on October 18, 1930 in Sacramento.

The California Junior Scholarship Federation subdivision was established in 1967.

== Symbols ==
The seal of the California Scholarship Federation was originally that of the Long Beach High School's honor society. The seal is placed on the diploma of graduating members.

The federation also has a member's pin, shaped like a lamp. This pin was approved December 20, 1922. Some chapters also had their own pin, but this practice was discontinued.

== Activities ==
CSF promotes the education of academically motivated students, encouraging them to get involved in their communities through volunteer service.

Members of CSF consist of students who have met the academic, service, and character standards set by their school and the federation. Members are eligible for a variety of tuition scholarships available at universities across the state and in select colleges nationwide. Regional subcommittees nominate several members as Life Members based upon character, leadership abilities and volunteer service. Fifty of these students receive $2,000 each, and five (one from each region of California) are awarded an additional $3,000 toward their college tuition.

== Chapters ==
More than 1,500 chapters have been chartered at high school and middle school in California.

== Notable members ==
- Henry Caruso, basketball player
- A. J. Cruz, gridiron football player
- Brett Dalton, actor
- Laura Davis, medley swimmer
- Randall William Davis, marine biologist
- Jacqueline Frank DeLuca, water polo player
- Sid Espinosa, businessman and mayor of Palo Alto, California
- Jazmin Grace Grimaldi, actress, singer, royal
- David J. Wineland, physicist at the Physical Measurement Laboratory of the National Institute of Standards and Technology
- Marvin X, poet

== See also ==
- Honor society
