= Ifill =

Ifill is a surname. Notable people with the surname include:

- Gwen Ifill (1955–2016), American journalist
- Kerryann Ifill, 2012 nominated President of the Senate of Barbados
- Nicholas Ifill (born 1968), Barbadian-born Canadian cricketer
- Paul Ifill (born 1979), Barbadian football player
- Percy C. Ifill (1913–1973), American architect
- Sherrilyn Ifill, law professor and President and Director-Counsel of the NAACP Legal Defense Fund

== See also ==
- Ifil
