= Agana Historic District =

- U.S. National Register of Historic Places
- U.S. Historic district
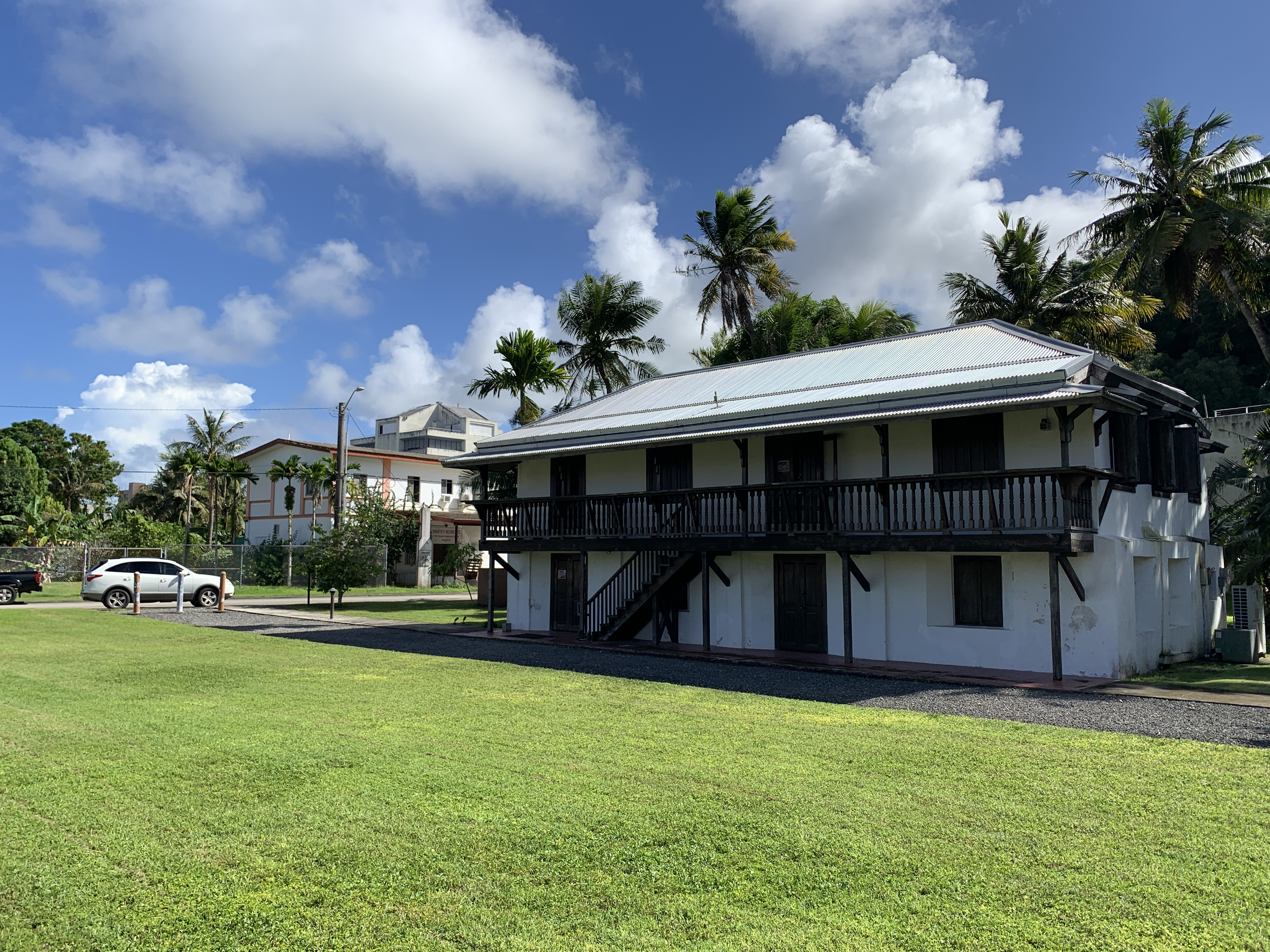

- Location within Guam
- Location: Roughly bounded by 2nd S., 3rd S., and 9th W., Santa Cruz and Legaspi Sts., Hagåtña (Agana), Guam
- Coordinates: 13°28′27″N 144°45′52″E
- Area: 2 acres (0.81 ha)
- Built by: Multiple
- Architectural style: Spanish Col. Pacific vernacular
- MPS: Agana Houses TR
- NRHP reference No.: 85000495
- Added to NRHP: February 8, 1985

The Agana Historic District in Hagåtña (formerly Agana), Guam is a 2-acre (0.81 ha) historic district that was listed on the U.S. National Register of Historic Places in 1985. It includes five contributing buildings: the Calvo-Torres, Rosario, Martinez-Notley, Lujan and Leon Guerrero houses. The area is roughly bounded by 2nd S., 3rd S., and 9th W., Santa Cruz and Legaspi Sts. in Agana.

The Calvo-Torres and Martinez-Notley houses are the oldest surviving private residences in Guam. The set of structures are Guam's oldest concrete buildings. And the set is the only surviving group of pre-World War II houses in Agana, "the only fragment left of old Agana's urban space." While a few scattered other individual structures survive, all else has been destroyed by World War II, termites, typhoons Karen of 1962 and Pamela of 1976, and other causes. They are also significant for tie to the Spanish colonial era and the use of ifil wood prior to Guam's deforestation.

The Calvo-Torres House is the oldest, with its oldest part dating about 1800. It is approximately 16.6 by 17.6 metres (54 ft × 58 ft) in plan, has ifil framing, and is roofed by original Spanish tile plus later metal roofing. The oldest part, built of manposteria (coral mixed with lime mortar), once hosted a silversmith. A kitchen was added, and, in the 1920s, a concrete addition.

The Rosario House is believed to have been built in the late 1800s. It is a 8.8 by 11.3 metres (29 ft × 37 ft) south-facing "one-and-a-half bodega type" structure.

Part of the Martinez-Notley House was built in 1826. William H. Notley married into the Martinez family. The house is 20.9 by 15.5 metres (69 ft × 51 ft). It is described as having massing and overall character with "strong Spanish overtones"; it is largely surrounded by manposteria walls.

The Leon Guerrero House is a 17.7-by-12-metre (58 ft × 39 ft) house started in 1939 but halted by rumors of war, then used as barracks by Japanese personnel during the war, with storage of rice in its lower level. It would have been destroyed after the war but its owner, Leon Guerrero, refused to vacate.

The Lujan House is separately listed on the National Register as Guam Institute.

== See also ==
- National Register of Historic Places listings in Guam
