= Randall William Davis =

American marine biologist

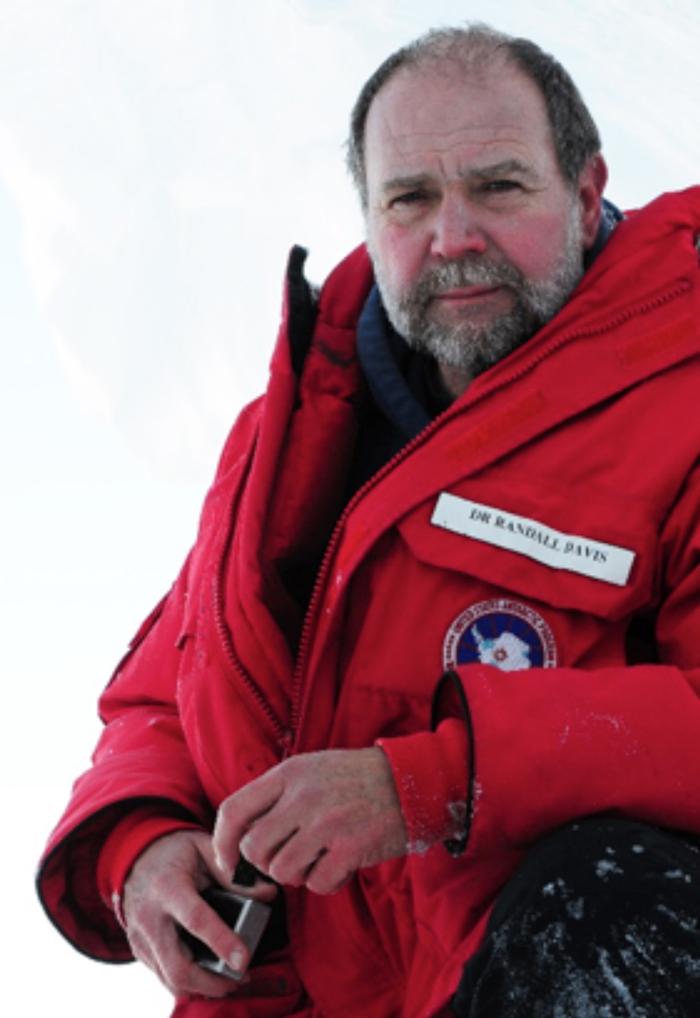
- Davis during an expedition in Antarctica
- Born: May 10, 1952 (age 74); Los Angeles, California
- Education: University of California, San Diego
- Known for: Adaptations in marine mammals for deep, prolonged diving Animal-borne video and data recorders Methods to rehabilitate oiled sea otters
- Awards: Fulbright Fellow; USGS site designation in Antarctica; Non-invasive research methods for wildlife
- Scientific career
- Fields: Physiological and behavioral ecology of marine mammals and other aquatic vertebrates
- Workplaces: Texas A&M University at Galveston
- Doctoral advisor: Gerald Kooyman

Randall William Davis (born 10 May 1952) is an American educator and researcher who studies the physiology and behavioral ecology of marine mammals and other aquatic vertebrates. His physiological research focuses on adaptations of marine mammals for deep, prolonged diving. Davis has continually emphasized the importance of studying aquatic animals in their natural environment and has spent many years developing animal-borne instruments that record video and monitor three-dimensional movements, swimming performance and environmental variables to better understand their behavior and ecology. His academic endeavors and 94 research expeditions have taken him to 64 countries and territories on seven continents and all of the world's oceans.

== Education and early career ==
Randall Davis is the oldest son of Charles Davis and Beverly Sheldon who met and married in Los Angeles after the Second World War. His father, who was from Iola, Kansas, moved to Southern California in the 1930s, and his mother was a native of Los Angeles. In 1958, at the age of five, Davis moved from Los Angeles to the nearby San Gabriel Valley. During his early childhood, he developed an interest in marine biology and diving. He kept marine aquaria, collected his own specimens of vertebrates and invertebrates, and obtained his SCUBA certification at age 15. He was the Salutatorian in his graduating Nogales High School class in 1970 and was inducted into the California Scholarship Federation. Davis attended the University of California at Riverside as a pre-medical student, but spent his third year in the Department of Physiology at the University of St. Andrews in Scotland as part of the UC Education Abroad Program. It was there that he developed his keen interest in physiology, but he also traveled across Europe and had cultural experiences that motivated him to also study art history, comparative literature, music appreciation and medieval philosophy. He graduated from the University of California with a Bachelor of Science Degree in Biology in 1974 and was inducted into the Phi Beta Kappa Honor Society because of his simultaneous interest in the Liberal Arts. Davis married Coco Melgoza in 1974, and the two of them returned to St. Andrews where he continued his studies in the Department of Physiology. After one year, Davis was accepted into the Physiology and Pharmacology Doctoral Program in the School of Medicine at the University of California at San Diego.

His first graduate advisor was John B. West, high-altitude respiratory physiologist. In early 1976, Davis conducted an internship with Gerald Kooyman, a comparative physiologist working at Scripps Institution of Oceanography. Kooyman was studying the diving physiology of harbor seals and had recently developed the first animal-borne time-depth recorders (TDRs) to study the diving behavior of free-ranging marine mammals. Davis decided to study the physiology of marine mammals and became Kooyman's Doctoral student in 1976. He spent that summer attaching TDRs to northern fur seals on the Pribilof Islands in the Bering Sea, then sailed on the National Science Foundation's research vessel Hero to South Georgia Island in the Southern Ocean to study the diving behavior of Antarctic fur seals. He returned to South Georgia Island in 1979 and deployed the first microprocessor-based dive recorders on King Penguins, the results of which were published in the journal Science.

Davis was a member of Kooyman's 1977 Weddell seal study in McMurdo Sound, Antarctica that led to the concept of an aerobic dive limit (ADL) and transformed the field of marine mammal diving physiology. During his five years as a doctoral student at Scripps, Davis studied the intermediary metabolism of harbor seals during forced submersion by using isotopic tracers and was one of the first researchers to use this technique with marine mammals. He interacted with Per Fredrik Scholander, the comparative physiologist who established the Physiological Research Laboratory at Scripps in the late 1950s.

In 1980, Davis graduated with a Doctoral Degree in Physiology and immediately departed for Antarctica where he, his wife Ana Maria, and two colleagues spent a year (including the austral winter) in a remote field camp at White Island studying the diving behavior of Weddell seals. For his effort, Davis received an Antarctica Service Medal with Winter Ribbon and a U.S. Geological Service Antarctic Site Designation 18773 (Davis Bluff; 79°09’ S, 167°35’ E) on White Island and was inducted into the Explorers Club. Upon returning to Scripps, he received a National Institutes of Health Post-Doctoral Fellowship where he continued his research on harbor seal metabolism during submerged swimming In 1983, he became a Research Scientist at the Hubbs-SeaWorld Research Institute in San Diego under the direction of William Evans. While at Hubbs, Davis and his colleagues studied the thermoregulatory effects of oil on sea otters and developed methods to mitigate the harmful impacts. In March 1989, he was asked by the U.S. Department of the Interior to direct an Oiled Sea Otter Rehabilitation Program following the Exxon Valdez oil spill in Prince William Sound, Alaska. This program rehabilitated 225 oiled sea otters and became the basis for a book that Davis co-authored on methods for rehabilitating oiled sea otters and other fur-bearing mammals.

He also designed and patented (U.S. Patent 5315965,) an aquatic vivarium for sea otters and aquatic birds, of which 40 are now installed at the Marine Wildlife Veterinary Care and Research Center in Santa Cruz, California. After this one-year effort, for which he received a Distinguished Service Award from the Exxon Corporation, Davis joined the faculty in the Department of Marine Biology at Texas A&M University where he has continued his teaching and research.

== Teaching ==
Davis teaches undergraduate and graduate courses in Comparative Physiology, Physiological Ecology of Marine Mammals, Marine Science of the Pacific Rim and a field course on the Coastal Marine Biology of Alaska. He advises the oil industry and state and federal agencies on oil spill contingency planning and response, and teaches an annual training course on the rehabilitation of oiled sea otters for members of the public that would like to volunteer in the event of another spill in Alaska. People that complete this course receive an 8-hour First Responder OSHA Certificate that allows them to work in an oiled otter rehabilitation facility. As part of this training, Davis has an open-access web site (www.wildliferesearch.com) that also includes information on the life history of sea otters for students and the general public. He has published educational articles for primary and secondary students and the general public on the effects of oil on marine mammals and methods to mitigate the harmful impacts. Davis has been featured in or helped to produce six educational films on marine mammals, one of which received first place in the Jack Ward Competition for Non-Commercial Films.

== Research ==
Davis participated in the first deployments of mechanical and microprocessor time-depth recorders (TDRs) on pinnipeds and penguins in the mid-to-late 1970s. The 1980s saw the advent of more sophisticated microprocessor-based archival and satellite-monitored tags and, by 1986, thousands of dives had been recorded on many species of marine mammals, penguins and reptiles. However, time-depth profiles did not provide information on what the animals were doing at depth, so any behavioral interpretations were speculative. This led Davis to partner with an electronics engineer (William Hagey) to begin developing instruments that would eventually record video as well as depth, swim speed, magnetic bearing, pitch and roll, flipper/fluke stroking, GPS location at the surface and environmental variables such as conductivity (salinity), temperature and dissolved oxygen. The first instrument they deployed in 1987 on a Weddell seal in Antarctica was a Sony camcorder in a plastic housing. Although simple by modern standards, it demonstrated that animal-borne video and data recorders could provide a new approach to studying marine animals. By mounting the camera on the head, the video recorded prey capture which could be correlated with three-dimensional movements, swim speed, flipper stroking and body orientation. During the past three decades, Davis and Hagey have developed five generations of video and data recorders that have been deployed on seals, whales, sea turtles and sharks. Each generation was smaller, had more sensors and could record video and data over longer periods of time. With these instruments, researchers can now classify and distinguish the behavioral functions of different dive types and describe foraging strategies and hunting tactics in detail. This work continues to be a major focus of Davis' research.

Davis and his graduate students have spent over four decades studying the morphological, physiological and metabolic adaptations of marine mammals for deep, prolonged diving. Davis' research has shown that the dive response (a fundamental adaptation for breath-hold diving) is more complex than earlier recognized. Although the dive response is a primitive cardiovascular response to protect animals from asphyxia, Davis showed that it has been integrated with the equally primitive exercise (fight-or-flight) response to regulate blood flow in a manner that maintains aerobic metabolism at different levels of submerged exercise. Additional research has revealed morphological, cellular and enzymatic adaptations in a variety of tissues and organs that maintain aerobic metabolism during hypoxia associated with breath-hold diving. Davis’ research has led to new discoveries and insights into the multi-level adaptations, from biochemistry to behavior, for breath-hold diving in marine mammals and other aquatic vertebrates

A third area of Davis’ research has focused on the thermoregulatory physiology of sea otters and the harmful effects of oil exposure. In the 1980s, Davis and his colleague Terrie Williams conducted research for the U.S. Department of the Interior that developed techniques to mitigate the effects of oil on sea otters and other fur bearing marine mammals. In the 1980s, the primary concern of the U.S. Department of the Interior had been the potential devastation of the small California sea otter population by an oil tanker spill. However, it was during the 1989 Exxon Valdez oil spill in Prince William Sound, Alaska that their science-based techniques to clean and rehabilitate otters were first used when Davis was asked by the U.S. Department of the Interior to direct the Sea Otter Rehabilitation Program. This effort, involving over 300 people, rehabilitated and released 225 oiled sea otters, the largest number ever held in captivity. Davis then co-authored a book on the methods for rehabilitating oiled sea otters, and this is still the standard among rehabilitation programs for fur bearing marine mammals.

In addition to the effects of oil on sea otters, Davis has studied the behavioral ecology of sea otters in Prince William Sound, Alaska since 2001. This long-term study has included foraging behavior and prey preference, foraging mechanics, female and pup activity and energy budgets, male activity budgets and territoriality, habitat-associations, and non-invasive methods to identify individual sea otters for which he received the Christine Stevens Wildlife Award in 2007. Davis has conducted additional studies on the movements, behavior and habitat associations of cetaceans in the Gulf of Mexico, sperm whales in the Gulf of California and New Zealand, Heaviside's dolphins off the coast of South Africa, northern elephant seals in California, southern elephant seals in Argentina, and spotted seals in Alaska. He has also conducted research on the diving behavior, energetics and maternal strategies of fur seals, sea lions and penguins and locomotion and thermoregulation in whale sharks.

== Major publications ==
Davis has published about 130 peer-reviewed articles and books, but the most important have focused on: 1) the development and use of animal-borne technology that has extended our understanding of the life history, behavior, ecology and evolutionary adaptations of aquatic animals at sea, 2) the morphological, physiological and metabolic adaptations of marine mammals for deep, prolonged diving and 3) the development and use of techniques to mitigate the effects of oil exposure on sea otters and other fur bearing marine mammals and 4) the behavioral ecology of sea otters.

== Honors and awards ==
- 1977, 1981 Antarctic Service Medal with Winter Ribbon
- 1983 Inducted into the Explorer's Club
- 1990 Distinguished Service Award for the Exxon Valdez Oil Spill Response for Sea Otters
- 2005 USGS Antarctic Site Designation 18773, Davis Bluff on White Island, Antarctica in honor of research on Weddell seals from 1977-2003, including the winter of 1981
- 2008 Christine Stevens Wildlife Award for innovations in non-invasive research methods for wildlife
- 2008 First place in the Jack Ward Competition for Non-Commercial Films presented to Jesse E. Purdy and Randall W. Davis, Co-Producers of: "The World of Weddell Seals." The 45th Animal Behavior Society Meeting
- 2012 Fulbright Fellow
