= Edward Kelland-Espinosa =

British ballet dancer (1906-1991)

Edward Kelland-Espinosa (1906–1991) was the son of Edouard Espinosa, founder of the British Ballet Organization (BBO), and his wife, Eve Louise Kelland.

== Personal life ==
Kelland-Espinosa was born in London in 1906 to parents Edouard Espinosa and Eve Louise Kelland. His sister, Yvette Espinosa, was born in 1911.

== Career ==
Kelland-Espinosa experienced success as both a performer and a teacher before devoting his career to developing the BBO and raising the standard of teaching throughout the country and abroad.

After his father's death in 1950, Edward took over the administration of the BBO and was elected chairman. Alongside his sister, Yvette Espinosa, he ran the organization until his retirement in January 1987.

== Bibliography ==
- Tap Dancing: Volume 6 (1963)
- Tap Dancing: Analytical Description and Counting of the Entire Syllabus as Used in General Work and Also the Examinations of the Tap Branch of the British Ballet Organization (1967)
- Tap Branch of the British Ballet Organization: Senior Tap Syllabus, Minor Examinations (1967)
- Tap Dancing: The Lower Preliminary Syllabus for Pupils and Teachers (1967)
- The Solo Irish Jig: Analytical Description and Counting of a Simple Sequence of a Traditional Irish Step Dance (1967)
- Tap Branch of the British Ballet Organization: Higher Primary Syllabus, Minor Examination (1968)
- Tap Dancing: The Elementary Syllabus for Pupils and Teachers (1970)
- Tap Branch of the British Ballet Organization: Intermediate Syllabus, Major Examination (1972)
- Tap Branch of the British Ballet Organization: Lower Preliminary Syllabus, Minor Examination (1972)
- Tap Branch of the British Ballet Organization: Preparatory Advanced Syllabus, Major Examination (1973)
- Tap Dancing: The Higher Preliminary Syllabus for Pupils and Teachers (1975)
- Tap Dancing Pt. 1: Elementary (1979)
- Tap Dancing: The Lower Preliminary Syllabus for Pupils and Teachers (1980)
