= Yvette Espinosa =

English ballerina (1911–1992)

Yvette Espinosa (1911–1992) was an English ballerina. She was born in England, the daughter of Eve Louise Kelland and Edouard Espinosa, founder of the British Ballet Organization Mother of Tandy Muir-Warden (J. David Barron) and Dayle Rasmussen (George Rasmussen).

Following her success as a performer and teacher, she joined her brother, Edward Kelland-Espinosa, in devoting her career to developing the BBO and raising the standard of teaching throughout the country and abroad.
