= Sid Espinosa =

American businessman and politician

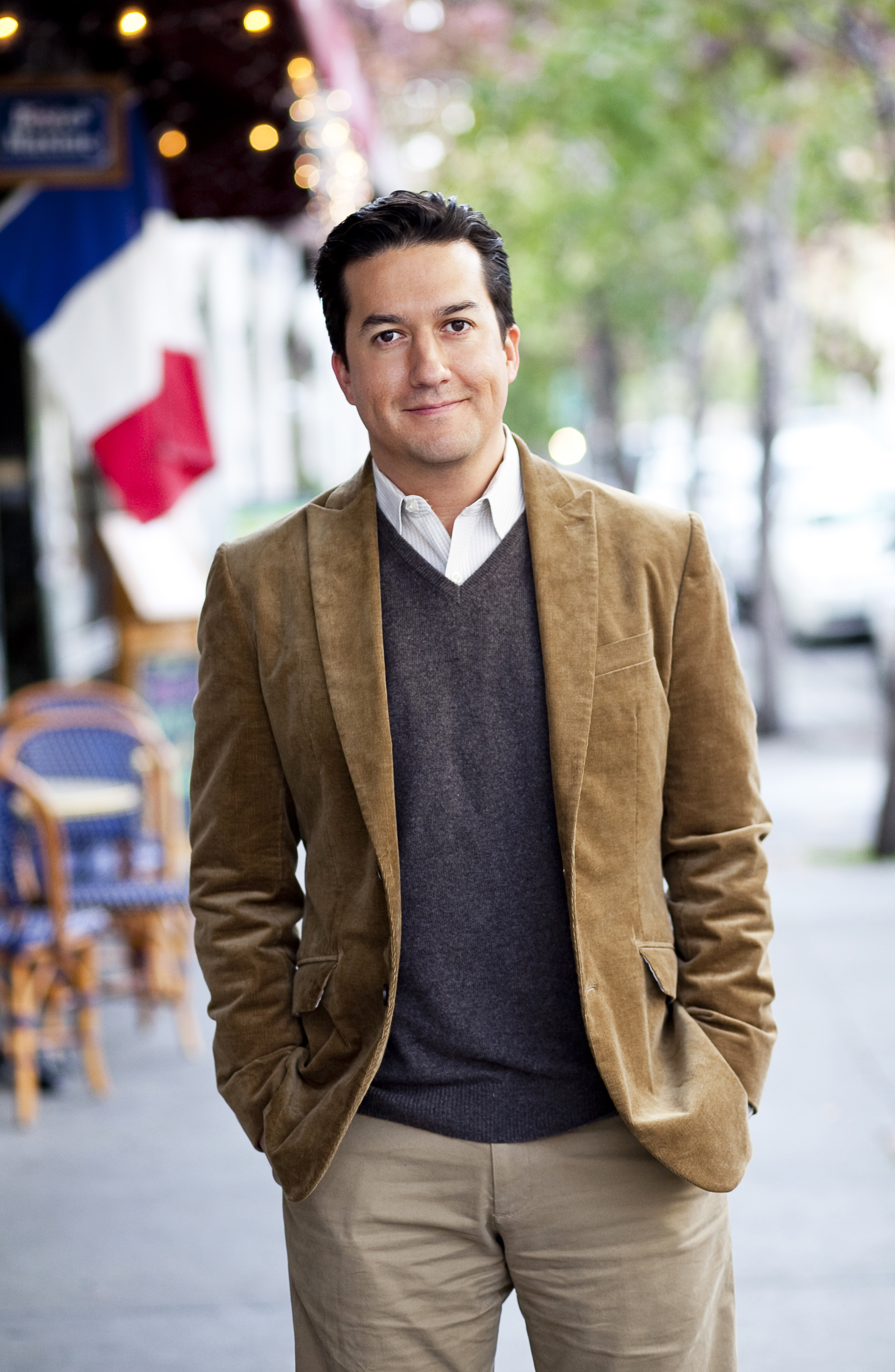

Mayor of Palo Alto, California
- In office January 4, 2011 – January 7, 2013
- Preceded by: Pat Burt
- Succeeded by: Greg Scharff

Member of the Palo Alto City Council
- In office 2008–2012

Personal details
- Born: Sidney Abel Espinosa; May 24, 1972 (age 54) Santa Clara, California, U.S.
- Party: Democratic
- Education: Wesleyan University; Harvard University
- Occupation: Businessman, politician

Sid Espinosa (born May 24, 1972) is an American businessman and politician. He is the former mayor of Palo Alto, CA, notably the first Hispanic to be elected to public office in that city's history, and at 38 years old at the time he was elected, he was one of the city's youngest mayors. He is also the Director of Corporate Citizenship for Microsoft Corporation in the Silicon Valley.

== Early years ==
Sidney Abel Espinosa was born at Kaiser Hospital in Santa Clara, CA and raised in the agricultural town of Gilroy, CA ("The Garlic Capital of the World"). His father, Abel Espinosa, who is an immigrant from Mexico, arrived in the United States "penniless and speaking only Spanish," and became a successful engineer. His mother, Janet Espinosa, is a retired teacher, professor and executive director of an educational non-profit organization.

Espinosa grew up "surrounded by orchards, animals, and rolling hills," giving him a love of nature and the environment and leading to his "passionate work with numerous environmental organizations." He was an active Gilroy High School graduate where he served as senior class president, an editor of the Yearbook, the president of the California Scholarship Federation, and the French Club. During his teens, Espinosa won several regional art competitions for his paintings and drawings, and was very active in the First Presbyterian Church, track and field team and the community theatre. He later graduated from Wesleyan University in Middletown, CT where he majored in government. At Wesleyan, Espinosa wrote for the student newspaper (the Argus), sang in the Ebony Singers gospel choir, and served as the president of MEChA, an advocacy organization for Hispanic students. Espinosa later earned a master's degree from the Kennedy School of Government at Harvard University, where he developed a passion for philanthropy and "its power to transform communities and individuals.”

== Professional life ==
Espinosa's career has spanned the government, business, philanthropic and non-profit sectors. After working at the Democratic National Committee during the 1994 congressional campaigns, Espinosa joined the Clinton Administration working both at the White House and then as an advisor to U.S. Attorney General Janet Reno at the U.S. Department of Justice. To this day, Janet Reno remains "a close mentor and friend" who "shaped who [he] is professionally and as a person.”

"To have someone, while you're in your 20's, mentor you and take you under her wing – especially someone so focused on justice and on doing what's right, someone who has spent her entire career not focused on fame or recognition, but on making the society a better place – she instilled those qualities into everyone who worked for her."

Espinosa briefly worked overseas for Carolyn Curiel, who was then the U.S. Ambassador to Belize.

In 2000, Espinosa joined Hewlett-Packard Company (HP), where he worked on government and public policy issues related to the technology sector at local, state, national and international levels. Eventually, he became HP's Director of Global Philanthropy, leading the annual investment of tens of millions of dollars in non-profit organizations and schools in 60 countries around the world and in all 50 U.S. states. Espinosa traveled around the globe numerous times during this period, and became a frequent lecturer on philanthropic and corporate social responsibility trends. While working at HP, Espinosa resided at 367 Addison Avenue (home of "The HP Garage"), the national historic landmark officially recognized as the "Birthplace of Silicon Valley."

In 2008, Espinosa was listed among the "40 Under 40" of the Silicon Valley, which is an annual list of "rising stars in the Valley … who are the dealmakers and innovators to watch."

In 2009, Espinosa joined Microsoft Corporation as the Director of Corporate Citizenship in the Silicon Valley. There he is developing, "comprehensive programs from grassroots community efforts to establishing effective long-term philanthropic partnerships with non-profit organizations that improve the quality and access to education, improve the environment and assist in workforce development and skills training." Microsoft is ranked third among Silicon Valley corporations for local philanthropic cash donations.

In 2011, the non-profit organization Hidden Villa awarded Espinosa the Humanitarian of the Year Award along with former U.S. Cabinet Secretary Norm Mineta and philanthropist Susan Ford Dorsey.

Espinosa has served on numerous boards of directors for business, non-profit and educational organizations around the world. In Palo Alto, he has served on the board of the Chamber of Commerce, Art Center Foundation and Historical Association (advisory). He is currently on the board of trustees of his undergraduate alma mater, Wesleyan University.

== Political life ==
On July 16, 2007, Espinosa declared his candidacy for the Palo Alto City Council, and on November 6, 2008, he was elected by a wide margin, becoming the first and still only Hispanic to be elected to public office in the city's history. At 38, he was the city's fourth youngest mayor. While on the council, Espinosa has been an advocate for fiscal responsibility, library and school investments, services for the homeless, emergency preparedness and the environment. He is considered an independent thinker who is "hard to pigeon hole." In 2008, he was actively involved in the successful Measure N campaign to pass a school parcel tax for the city. In 2009, he served on the campaign committee that sought to pass a library bond for the city. The bond passed with 76% of the vote.

On January 4, 2011, Espinosa was elected mayor of Palo Alto. In his State of the City address, he outlined five city priorities: city finances and economic development; land use and planning; environmental sustainability; emergency preparedness; and community collaboration for youth well-being. Espinosa has also been a vocal advocate for increased transparency in government and the use of technology to better community with and provide services for citizens." After a string of teen suicides in the city, Espinosa has become increasingly focused on the city's youth programs and teen mental health issues.

== Criticism ==
Espinosa had a public conflict with political watchdog Mark Petersen-Perez about the means by which Petersen-Perez exercised his First Amendment right to petition local government for redress of grievances. Sid Espinosa, has been unable to present a single constitutional reason for disallowing critical comments of local or national politicians. Our constitution through many Supreme Court decisions has enforced this inalienable right. "[I]t is a prized American privilege to speak one's mind, although not always with perfect good taste on all public institutions." Palo Alto Mayor Sid Espinosa has said, "he's going to have a talk with City Hall critic Mark Petersen-Perez, whom he has twice warned about his conduct at council meetings, which included calling a city attorney "diablo" and warned that he may cut off or "censure" people who don't abide by a meeting protocol..."
