= Oscar Espinosa =

Oscar Espinosa may refer to:

- Óscar Espinosa Chepe (1940–2013), Cuban economist and dissident
- Óscar Espinosa Moraga (1928–2010), Chilean historian and writer
- Óscar Espinosa Villarreal (born 1953), Mexican politician
