= Francisco Espinosa =

Francisco Espinosa may refer to:

- Francisco Espinosa (cyclist) (born 1962), Spanish racing cyclist
- Francisco Espinosa (racing driver) (1947–2001), Argentine racing driver
- Francisco Espinosa Ramos (born 1954), Mexican politician
