= Fernando Espinoza =

Fernando Espinosa or Espinoza may refer to:

- Fernando Espinosa (Chilean footballer) (1949–2023)
- Fernando Espinoza (Chilean footballer) (born 1991)
- Fernando Espinosa (Mexican footballer) (born 1983)
- Fernando Espinoza (politician) (born 1968), Argentine politician

== See also ==
- Ing. Fernando Espinoza Gutiérrez International Airport, defunct airport in the Mexican state of Querétaro
