= Vanessa Solari Espinoza =

Multi-dimensional artist (born 1982)

Vanessa Solari Espinoza (born 1982), known as AGANA, is a multi-dimensional artist. Espinoza has a background in jewelry making, metal arts, spray paint art, dj-ing, large-scale murals, and as an educator. Her art can be found globally in Senegal, Switzerland, and the San Francisco Bay Area.

She has acquired partnerships with NBA Cares, MLB, and community organizations across the world to create street art.

== Early life and education ==
Espinoza is of Venezuelan descent and based in the San Francisco Bay Area. In 2005, she received her Associate in Art, Language Arts and Humanities from Peralta College, and in 2008, she received a BAS in Visual Effects from Oaklands Ex'pression College for Digital Art. She then went on to work in the film, animation and video game production industries.

== Notable work ==
Espinoza's work is influenced by her background as a Venezuelan American, and graffiti. She uses these influences in creating large scale murals using aerosol. Her murals are usually infused with historical, or political iconography honoring the communities, and people where her art is located.

Espinoza is a lead artist in the TDK Collective, a graffiti crew born out of Oakland by the late artist Mike Dream. Founded in 1985-6, 'TDK' originally stood for 'Those Damn Kids' and now, 'The Dream Krew' honoring the late founder. They are most famous for their heavy hitting art, vibrant colors, caricatures, and homages to Oaklands cultural fabric.

=== Brava Breathes Palabra (2020) ===
In 2020, Espinoza created the mural, Brava Breathes Palabra on the facade of the San Francisco Mission Districts Brava Theater Center. The mural combines community iconography, and portraits of community members, and artists using bright colors, and spray paint. The theme "Smash The Patriarchy" can be read above the theater doors, and reads as an homage to the theater, and legacy of the Mission District.

=== Tiny Locas (2023) ===
Espinoza with VOGUE of TDK in 2023 unveiled mural, 'Tiny Locas' on the facade of newly built Casa de la Mission in San Francisco's Mission District. The mural using classic graffiti style, bold, bright colors, and street art techniques pays homage to the legacy of the building, neighborhood, and its predecessors. The mural features Sandy Cuadra, late, longtime resident of the neighborhood, who was a culture keeper, DJ, artist, neighborhood friend, and co-founder of all-female crew 'Tiny Locas'. The mural features lowriders, portraits of neighborhood icons, and cultural iconography.

=== Oakland Pride Elementary (2025) ===
In 2025, through a partnership with the NBA, NBA cares, the NBA charity organization, the Golden State Warriors, Espinoza led an effort to coordinate a revitalization of Oakland public school, Oakland Pride Elementary along with 300+ volunteers, and artists VOGUE of TDK, Gloria Contreras, and Joseph Lopez. The revitalization effort included transforming the cafeteria, library, and gym, the planting of over 100 trees, creating garden beds, painting murals, and installing multi-sport courts.
