= Eve Louise Kelland =

Australian actress and singer

Eve Louise Kelland (1889–1943) was an actress and singer.

Eve Kelland started her theatrical career as an actress and singer. She became organiser and administrator of the British Ballet Organization founded in England in 1930, and in 1928 she started The Dancer magazine, under the name of Louise Kay. Their working partnership, promoting British dance and the BBO, was to continue for almost forty years.

== Personal life ==
Kelland was born in Sydney, Australia in 1889.

She married Eduard Espinosa, and they had two children, Edward Kelland-Espinosa (born 1906) and Yvette Espinosa (born 1911).
