= Ifil =

Ifil is a surname. Notable people with the surname include:

- Gwen Ifill (1955–2016), American journalist, television newscaster, and author
- Jerel Ifil (born 1982), English footballer
- Philip Ifil (born 1986), English footballer

It may also refer to:

- Ifil, a local name on Guam for Intsia bijuga

== See also ==
- Ifill
