= Edouard Espinosa =

British ballet dancer and teacher (1871–1950)

Edouard Espinosa (1872–1950) was a British ballet dancer and teacher. He was also the co-founder of the Royal Academy of Dancing and established the British Ballet Organization.

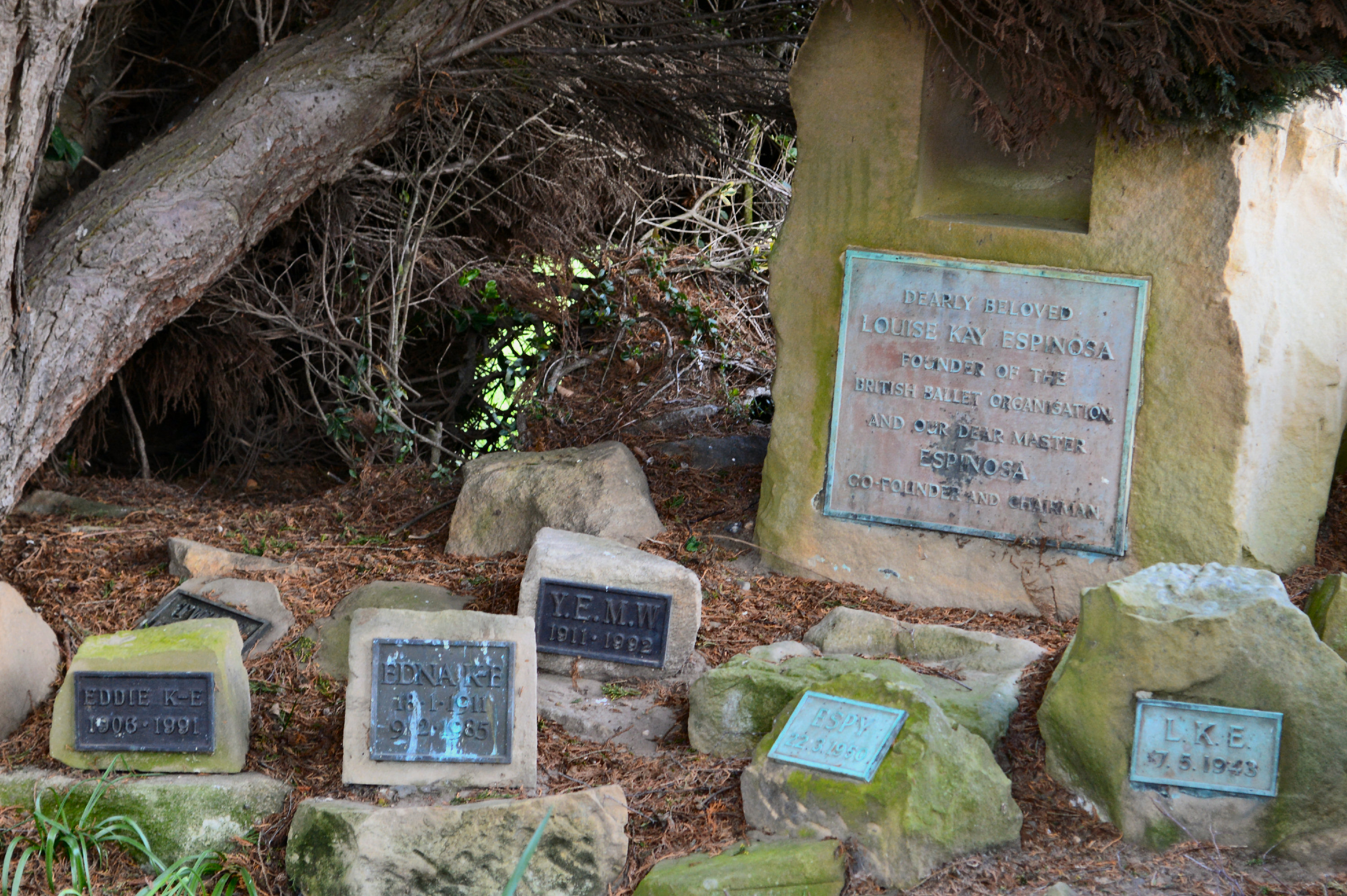
East Sheen Cemetery, Espinosa memorials

== Personal life ==
Espinosa was born in London in 1872 to Spanish Jewish parents Léon Espinosa and Mathilda Oberst. He had two brothers (Marius and Leo) and three sisters (Judith, Ray, and Lea), all of whom became dancers and teachers.

In 1874, the Espinosas moved to London, then to Paris in 1888. Shortly after, Edouard resided in a boarding school while his parents toured in Bordeaux, Brussels, and Berlin. Due to an injury, Léon stopped dancing, allowing his children to pick up the art.

He married Eve Louise Kelland, and had two children Edward Kelland-Espinosa and Yvette Espinosa.

== Career ==
=== Before dance ===
After Espinosa's father's injury stopped him from dancing, the Espinosa children became the family's financial support. Beginning at age twelve, Edouard picked up odd jobs "selling embroidery supplies, toys and Bohemian crystal, before becoming a sales representative for dental wares. Being briefly apprenticed to a local dentist, he even managed to botch his one and only tooth extraction ... before belatedly beginning his ballet training at the age of eighteen."

=== Dancer ===
Beginning at age 18, Espinosa trained in ballet under his father, Léon Espinosa. Although Espinosa had background in ballroom dancing, he was not a great ballet dancer. According to his father, "He [had] terrible feet, but wonderful knees." Through hard work, Espinosa slowly improved until he was able to perform as a soloist.

In 1889, Espinosa debuted at the Old London Aquarium. The performance went so poorly the manager warned that if had not been an Espinosa, he would have been finished with the company.

From 1891-1896, he danced with the Lyceum Theatre under the guidance of Henry Irving, then danced under Charles Frohman in New York for a season in 1893. Between 1896 and 1939, Espinosa was "Maître de Ballet for the Royal Opera House, Covent Garden, Empire Theatre, and Alhambra Theatre. During this time, he danced numerous shows, including Chu Chin Chow (1916), The Maid of the Mountains (1917), and The Last Waltz (1922).

In addition to performing, Espinosa worked with his father, Léon Espinosa, producing and choreographing for music hall, pantomime and plays throughout Britain and abroad. He was particularly adept at teaching and analysing steps. Espinosa codified the steps his father taught, and this code became the basis for the first structured syllabus of its kind to be devised internationally.

=== Dance teacher ===
While Espinosa was a great dancer, his greatest influence on ballet was as a teacher. In 1896, he opened his first ballet school, and in 1908, he established the British Normal School of Dancing, "the first to hold examinations and issue certificates."

During this time, Espinosa became friends with Phillip J. S. Richardson, who wrote for and eventually purchased Dancing Times. The two fretted over the number of unqualified ballet teachers and considered ways to alleviate this issue.

=== Royal Academy of Dance ===
In 1920, Espinosa and Richardson had ongoing meetings with other ballet greats, including Phyllis Bedells, Lucia Cormani, Adeline Genée, Tamara Karsavina, Ninette de Valois, and Anton Dolin to discuss the state of ballet and aimed to establish an “association which would make it its duty to see that all teachers taught correctly.” Eventually, the group founded the Association of Operatic Dancing, later known as the Royal Academy of Dance (RAD).

Three months after the founding of RAD, the school held the first ballet examinations.

During this time, Espinosa wrote The Elementary Technique of Operatic Dancing, originally called the Syllabus of Elementary Technique, which was published in 1928.

=== British Ballet Organization ===
In 1929, Espinosa broke away from the RAD and established the British Ballet Organization (BBO) with his wife a year later. By the time Espinosa left the Association of Operative Dancing, many of his students had become prominent teachers in various parts of the British Isles, and they formed the BBO's nucleus. Over the years, the organization expanded, offering a syllabus and examinations in dance. It extended its influence to South Africa, Australia, New Zealand and India, as well as all over the British Isles.

Espinosa taught many who would go on to have successful careers, including Dame Ninette de Valois, who in turn taught Celia Franca, the founder of the National Ballet of Canada.

After his death, his son, Eduard Kelly Espinosa, and daughter, Ivette, took over control of the BBO.

== The Espinosa Family Home ==
Woolborough House in London (39 Lonsdale Road) was the Espinosa family home from 1913. On the formation of the British Ballet Organization (BBO), it became the organization's headquarters. In 1932, a studio was built alongside the house which has continued to host classes and BBO examinations and provides rehearsal space for many leading dance companies and professional artists. In 2015, the BBO moved to Battersea Reach.

Many famous students studied with Espinosa at Woolborough House, including Phyllis Bedells and Ninette de Valois.

== Bibliography ==
- Espinosa, Edouard (1946). And then he danced. London: Sampson Low, Marston and Co.
- Espinosa, Edouard (1967). Ballet. London: E.K. Espinosa.

== See also ==
- Royal Academy of Dance
