= Bbodance =

British dance exam body

bbodance
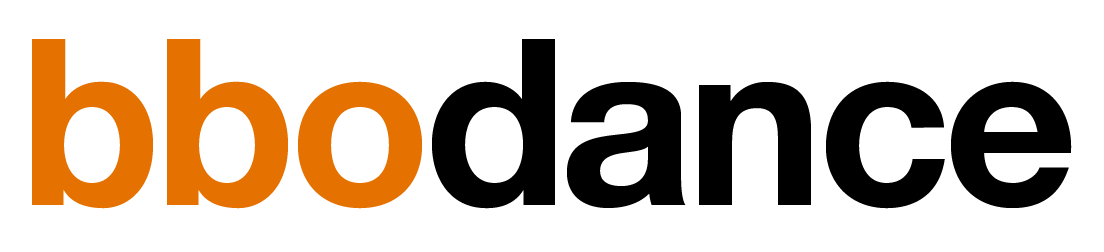
- Abbreviation: bbodance
- Formation: 1930
- Type: Dance Awarding Body
- Executive Chairman: Nicholas Espinosa
- Main organ: Board of Directors
- Affiliations: Council for Dance Education and Training
- Website: http://bbo.dance

bbodance, formerly the British Ballet Organization (BBO), is a dance examination board based in London, England.

== Overview ==
Formerly known as the British Ballet Organization, bbodance was founded in England in 1930 by Edouard Espinosa and his wife Eve Louise Kelland. Edouard Espinosa was a famous dance teacher and Louise was an actress and singer. It was established as a dance teaching society and developed a syllabus of Classical Ballet training.

The BBO is now one of the leading dance examination boards in the United Kingdom and provides an examination syllabus in Classical Ballet, Musical Theatre dance, Tap, Jazz, and Modern. The organisation also trains teachers, qualifying them to work in the private and state sectors.

bbodance is a registered dance awarding body of the Council for Dance, Drama and Musical Theatre (CDMT) and its qualifications are accredited by Ofqual(England) and Qualifications Wales. The organisation went through a major rebrand in 2016. Many notable dance artists are associated with it, from Dame Beryl Grey, CH, DBE (President) and Sir David Bintley, CBE (Vice President) to Patrons Craig Revel Horwood, Brenda Last OBE, Mark Baldwin OBE, Agnes Oaks CBE, Bonnie Langford, Doreen Wells, Marchioness of Londonderry, Tandy Muir-Warden, and Wayne Sleep OBE. The organisation's Founder President was Dame Ninette De Valois OM, CH, DBE.
