= Aethiopica =

Greek novel by Heliodorus

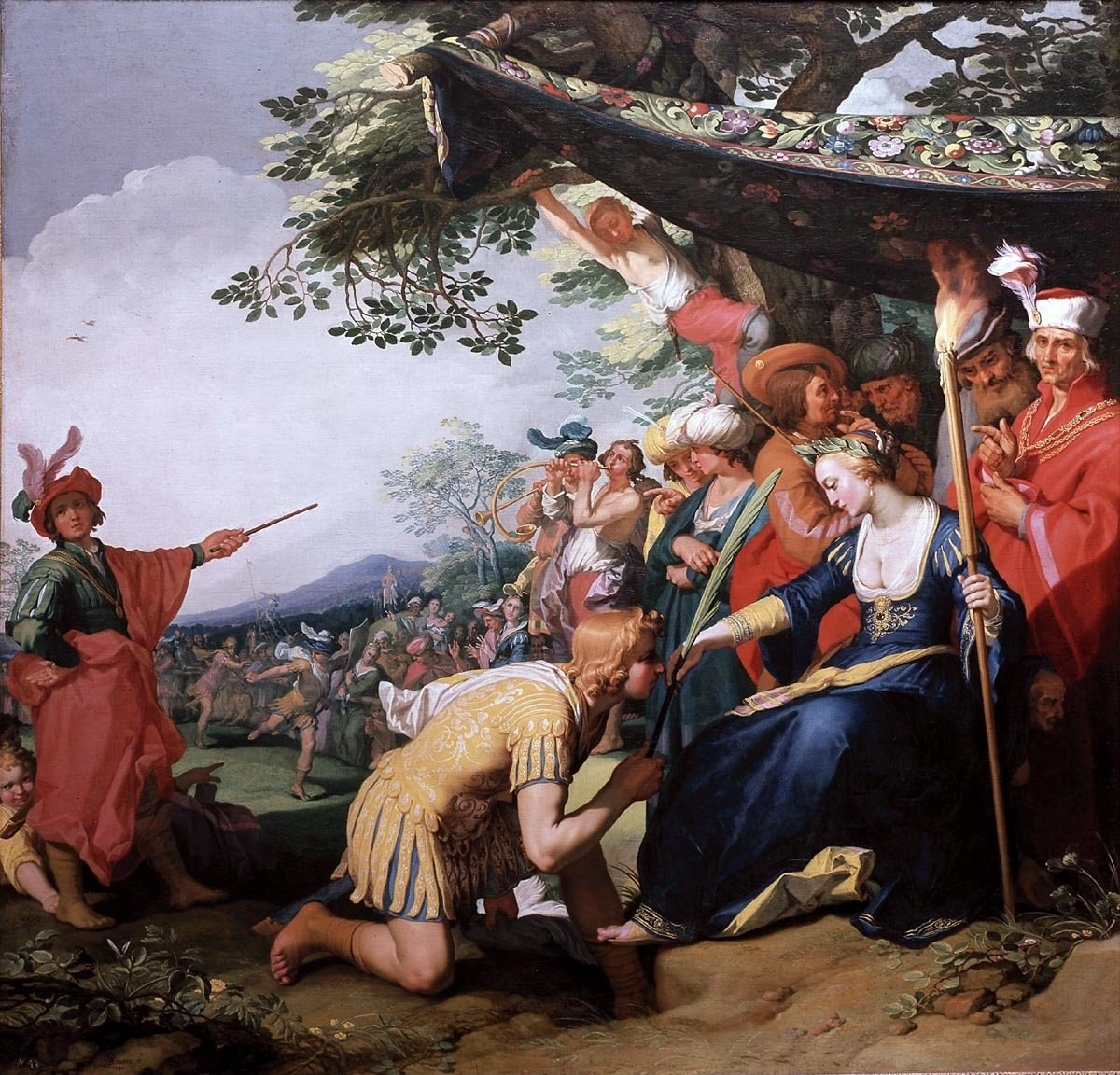
Theagenes receiving the palm of honour from Chariclea by Abraham Bloemaert, 1626 (Mauritshuis)

The Aethiopica (/ˌiːθiˈoʊpɪkə/; Ancient Greek: Αἰθιοπικά, Aithiopiká, 'Ethiopian Stories') or Theagenes and Chariclea (/θiˈædʒəˌniːz ... ˌkærɪˈkliːə/; Ancient Greek: Θεαγένης καὶ Χαρίκλεια, Theagénēs kaì Kharíkleia) is an ancient Greek novel which has been dated to the 220s or 370s AD. It was written by Heliodorus of Emesa and is his only known work.

== Author ==
The author of the Aethiopica identifies himself upon ending his work in this manner:

Τοιόνδε πέρας ἔσχε τὸ σύνταγμα τῶν περὶ Θεαγένην καὶ Χαρίκλειαν Αἰθιοπικῶν· ὃ συνέταξεν ἀνὴρ Φοῖνιξ Ἐμισηνός, τῶν ἀφ' Ἡλίου γένος, Θεοδοσίου παῖς Ἡλιόδωρος.

Translation:

Here ends the history of the Ethiopian adventures of Theagenes and Chariclea written by Heliodorus, a Phoenician of Emesus [modern Homs, Syria], son of Theodosius, and descended from the Sun [aph’ Hēlíou génos].

— Translated by Thomas Underdown

According to Richard L. Hunter,

The Emesenes were a culturally complex group, including Arab, Phoenician and Greek elements, and, since the third century at any rate, having a connection with the Roman imperial household (the empress Julia Domna was from Emesa, as was the cult of Elagabal which inspired the emperor Heliogabalus).

In the words of Tim Whitmarsh, ἀφ' Ἡλίου γένος (aph’ Hēlíou génos) "looks like a claim to hereditary priesthood," although "uncertainties" remain. According to The Cambridge History of Classical Literature, "the personal link here established between the writer and Helios has also a literary purpose, as has Calasiris' flashback narrative". The later tradition maintaining that Heliodorus had become a Christian bishop is likely fictional. (Note: Socrates Scholasticus (5th century AD) identifies the author of the Aethiopica with a certain Heliodorus, bishop of Trikka. Nicephorus Callistus (14th century) relates that the work was written in the early years of this bishop before he became a Christian and that, when forced either to disown it or resign his bishopric, he preferred resignation. Most scholars reject this identification.)

== Circulation and Western rediscovery ==
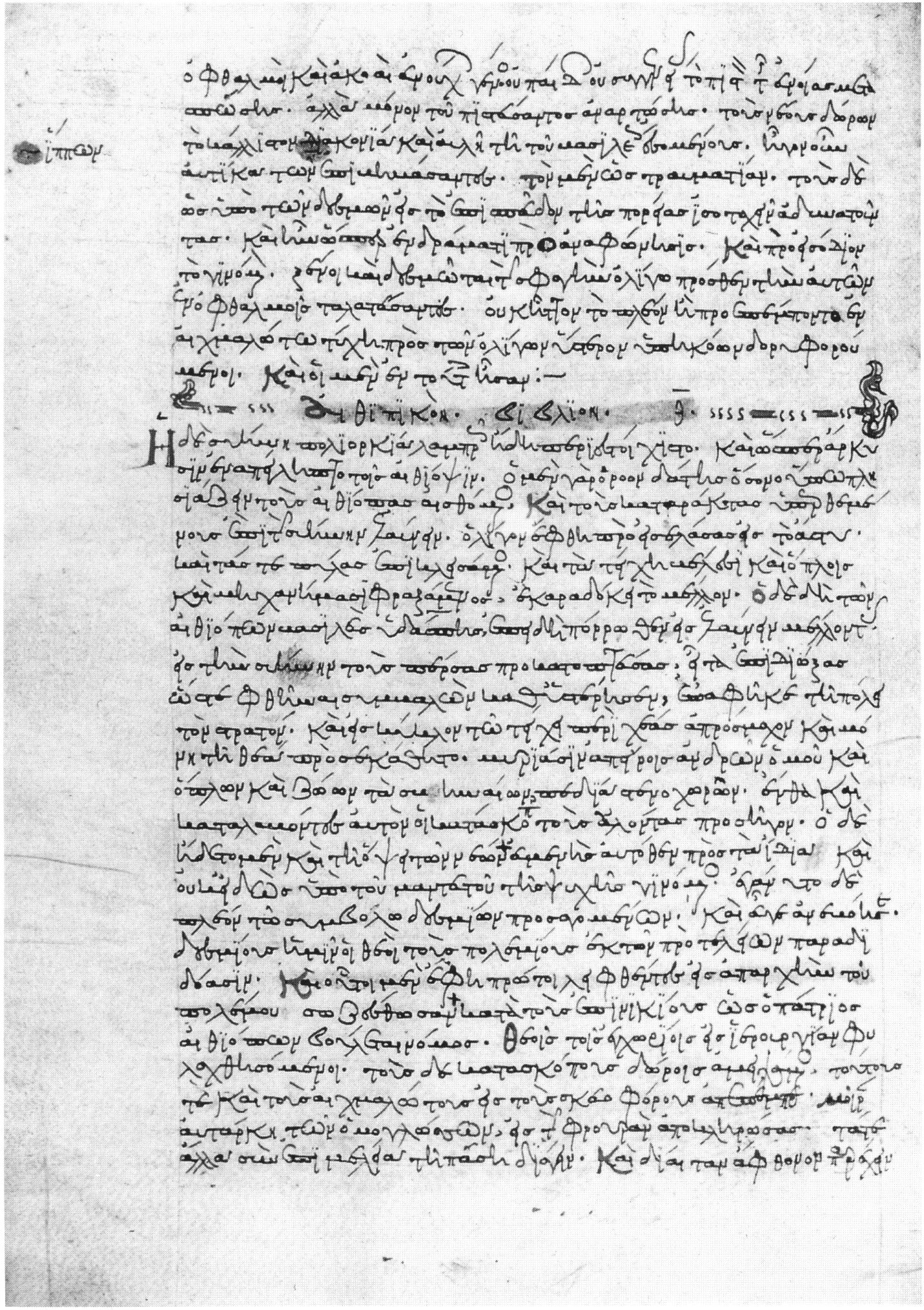
Folio from a MS. of the Aethiopica in the library of Bessarion (Biblioteca Nazionale Marciana, Gr. 410)

The novel continued to circulate during the Middle Ages amid the Greek readership in the Byzantine Empire. For example, it is mentioned in the will, dated 1059, of protospatharios Eustathios Voilas, to be bequeathed among several of his books to a monastery which he had founded.

The Aethiopica was first brought to light in Western Europe during the Renaissance in a manuscript from the library of Matthias Corvinus, found at the sack of Buda (now the western part of Budapest) in 1526, and printed at Basel in 1534. Other codices have since been discovered.

It was first translated into French by the celebrated Jacques Amyot in 1547. It was first translated into English in 1569 by Thomas Underdown, who used the 1551 Latin translation of Stanisław Warszewicki to create his Aethiopian Historie. It was printed several times by Gabriele Giolito de' Ferrari in the Republic of Venice (1556, 1560, 1586) in an Italian translation from Greek by Leonardo Ghini.

== Style ==
The Aethiopica is indebted to the works of Homer and Euripides. The title is taken from the fact that the action of the beginning and end of the story takes place in Aethiopia.

The work is notable for its rapid succession of events, the variety of its characters, its vivid descriptions of manners and of scenery, and its simple, elegant writing style. But what has been regarded as most remarkable is that the novel opens in the middle of the story ("in medias res"), and the plot is resolved by having various characters describe their prior adventures in retrospective narratives or dialogues, which eventually tie together. Homer utilized this technique in both his epic poems, the Iliad and the Odyssey. This feature makes the Aethiopica stand out from all the other ancient Greek romances.

== Plot summary ==
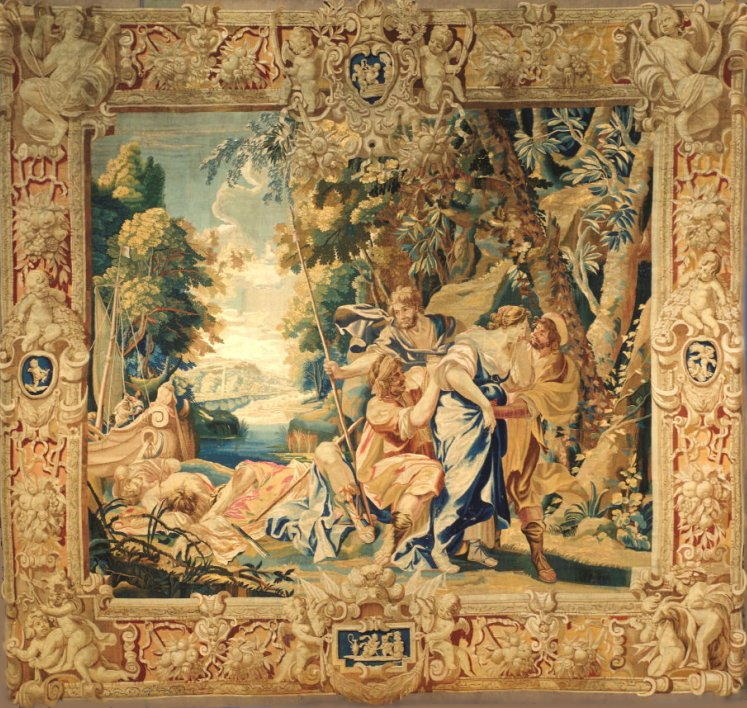
Chariclea Led Away by Pirates (c. 1634–35), a tapestry from the Paris workshop of Raphael de la Planche based on design by Simon Vouet

Chariclea, the daughter of King Hydaspes and Queen Persinna of Aethiopia, was born white through the effect of the sight of a marble statue upon the queen during pregnancy (an instance of the theory of maternal impression). Another version attributes Chariclea's birth to Queen Persinna seeing a painting of a white woman, "brought down by Perseus naked from the rock, and so by mishap engendered presently a thing like to her." The painting shows Andromeda, an Ethiopian princess. Fearing accusations of adultery, Persinna abandons her baby daughter but leaves her with three gifts: an inscribed ribbon with Ethiopic characters, a necklace, and a ring. The ring has magical powers and is described as, "it is set with a jewel called pantarbe and inscribed with certain sacred characters (γράμμασι δὲ ἱεροῖς); it is full, it seems, of a supernatural and mystic property (τελετῆς θειοτέρας) which I think must have endowed the stone with the power to repel fire and bestow immunity from the flames on its wearer.” Sisimithras, a gymnosophist, finds the baby and takes her to Egypt. Sisimithras places her in the care of Charicles, a Pythian priest. Chariclea is then taken to Delphi, and made a priestess of Artemis.

Theagenes, a noble Thessalian, comes to Delphi and the two fall in love. He runs off with Chariclea with the help of Calasiris (kalasiris), an Egyptian who has been employed by Persinna to find Chariclea. They encounter many perils: pirates, bandits, and others. The main characters ultimately meet at Meroë at the very moment when Chariclea is about to be sacrificed to the gods by her own father. Her birth is made known, and the lovers are happily married.

== Influence and adaptations ==
Heliodorus's novel was immensely influential and was imitated by Byzantine Greeks and by French, Italian, and Spanish writers.

The early life of Clorinda in Torquato Tasso's Jerusalem Delivered (canto xii. 21 sqq.) is almost identical with that of Chariclea.

The structure, events, and themes of the European adventure novel of the first half of the seventeenth century—Madeleine de Scudéry, Marin le Roy de Gomberville, Miguel de Cervantes's Persiles and Sigismunda, and likely Aphra Behn's Oroonoko—were directly modeled on Heliodorus's work. It was adapted by the French dramatist Alexandre Hardy under the title Les chastes et loyales amours de Théagène et Cariclée (published in 1623). John Gough, an English dramatist of Charles I's day, based his tragicomedy The Strange Discovery (published in 1640) on the Aethiopica. It was also adapted into an opera with a French libretto by Duché de Vancy and music by Henri Desmarets. French dramatist Jean Racine claimed that Heliodorus's novel was his favorite book. After he had joined the ascetic Jansenist retreat Port-Royal and the book had been repeatedly taken away from him, Racine is reported to have said that its loss no longer mattered since he had already memorized it.

The work's influence continued to be felt in the eighteenth-century novel (especially in novels with a "tale within a tale" structure).

Canadian writer Alice Munro refers to the novel in her short story "Silence," which also explores the theme of a mother detached from her daughter. The story was published in the book Runaway (2004).

== Editions ==
- Héliodore (1935). Rattenbury, Robert Mantle; Lumb, Thomas Wallace (eds.). Les Éthiopiques. Vol. I. Les Belles Lettres.
- Héliodore (1938). Rattenbury, Robert Mantle; Lumb, Thomas Wallace (eds.). Les Éthiopiques. Vol. II. Les Belles Lettres.
- Héliodore (1960). Rattenbury, Robert Mantle; Lumb, Thomas Wallace (eds.). Les Éthiopiques. Vol. III. Les Belles Lettres.
- Heliodorus (1938). Colonna, Aristides (ed.). Aethiopica. Romae: Typis Regiae officinae Polygraphicae.

== See also ==
Other ancient Greek novelists:

- Chariton – Chaereas and Callirhoe
- Xenophon of Ephesus – The Ephesian Tale
- Achilles Tatius – Leucippe and Clitophon
- Longus – Daphnis and Chloe
