= Chariton =

1st-century AD Greek writer

Chariton of Aphrodisias (Ancient Greek: Χαρίτων ὁ Ἀφροδισιεύς) was the author of an ancient Greek novel probably titled Callirhoe (based on the subscription in the sole surviving manuscript). However, it is regularly referred to as Chaereas and Callirhoe (which more closely aligns with the title given at the head of the manuscript). Evidence of fragments of the text on papyri suggests that the novel may have been written in the mid-1st century AD, making it the oldest surviving complete ancient prose romance and the only one to make use of apparent historiographical features for background verisimilitude and structure, in conjunction with elements of Greek mythology, as Callirhoe is frequently compared to Aphrodite and Ariadne and Chaereas to numerous heroes, both implicitly and explicitly. As the fiction takes place in the past, and historical figures interact with the plot, Callirhoe may be understood as the first historical novel; it was later imitated by Xenophon of Ephesus and Heliodorus of Emesa, among others.

== Dating ==
Nothing is securely known of Chariton beyond what he states in his novel, which introduces him as "Chariton of Aphrodisias, secretary of the rhetor Athenagoras". The name "Chariton", which means "man of graces", has been considered a pseudonym chosen to suit the romantic content of his writing, but both "Chariton" and "Athenagoras" occur as names on inscriptions from Aphrodisias.

The latest possible date at which Chariton could have written is attested in papyri that contain fragments of his work, which can be dated paleographically to about AD 200. A variety of dating suggestions have been generated by analyzing Chariton's words. A date as late as the sixth century AD was suggested in the 19th century, before the discovery of the papyri, based on stylistic considerations, while A. D. Papanikolaou argued for the second half of the first century BC in 1979. One study of Chariton's vocabulary favours a date in the late 1st century or early 2nd century AD.

Edmund Cueva has argued that Chariton also depended on Plutarch's vita of Theseus for thematic material, or perhaps directly on one of Plutarch's sources, an obscure mythographer, Paion of Amathus. If the source is Plutarch, then a date after the first quarter of the 2nd century is indicated. There is a dismissive reference, however, to a work called Callirhoe in the Satires of Persius, who died in AD 62; if this is Chariton's novel, then a relatively early date would be indicated. Regardless, Chariton probably wrote before the other Greek novelists whose works survive, making either his work or Petronius' Satyricon the earliest extant European novel.

== Callirhoe ==
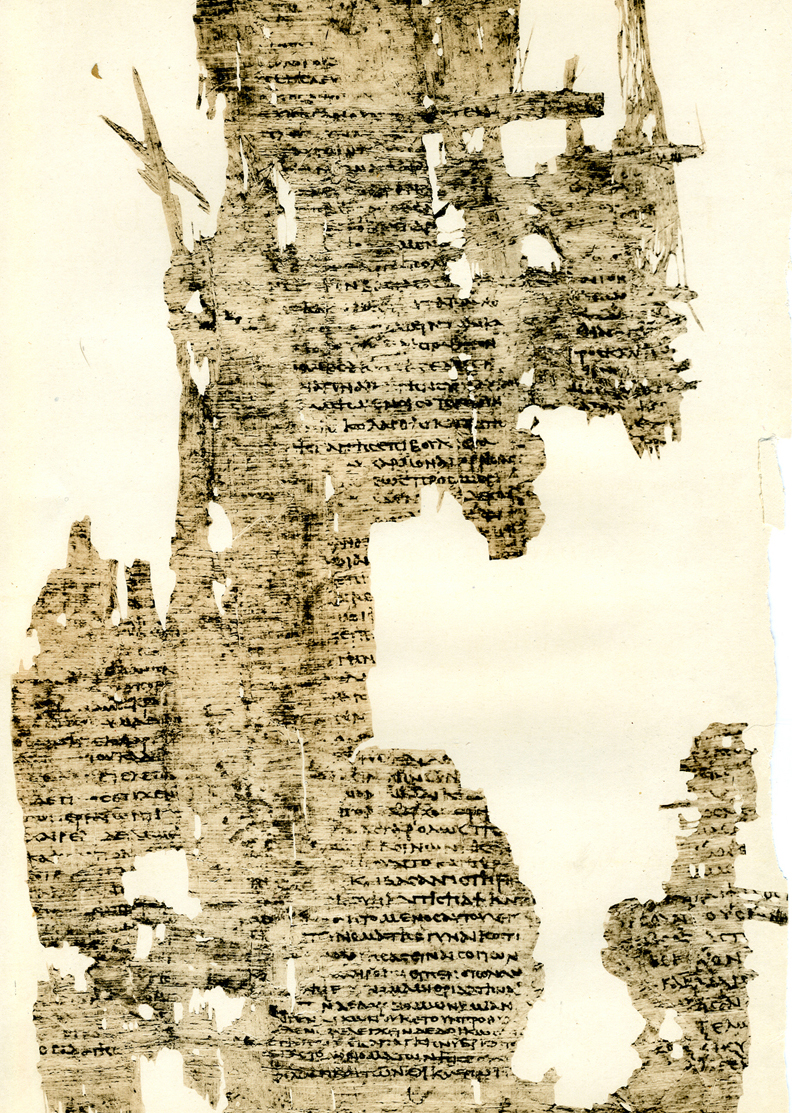
A second- or third-century AD papyrus of the Callirhoe from Karanis (P.Fay. 1)

Chariton's novel exists in only one (somewhat unreliable) manuscript, from the 13th century. It was not published until the 18th century, and remained dismissed until the twentieth. It nevertheless gives insight into the development of ancient prose fiction.

The story is set against a historical background of c. 400 BC. In Syracuse, Chaereas falls madly in love with the supernaturally beautiful Callirhoe. She is the daughter of Hermocrates, a hero of the Peloponnesian War and the most important political figure of Syracuse, thus setting the narrative in time and social milieu. Her beauty (kallos) overawes crowds, like an earthly counterpart of Aphrodite's, as noted by Douglas Edwards. They are married, but when her many disappointed suitors successfully conspire to trick Chaereas into thinking she is unfaithful, he kicks her so hard that she falls over as if dead. There is a funeral, and she is shut up in a tomb, but then it turns out she was only in a coma, and wakes up in time to scare the pirates who have opened the tomb to rob it; they recover quickly and take her to sell as a slave in Miletus, where her new master, Dionysius, falls in love with her and marries her, she being afraid to mention that she is already married (and pregnant by Chaereas). As a result, Dionysius believes Callirhoe's son to be his own.

Despite the liberties Chariton took with historical fact, he clearly aimed to place his story in a period well before his own lifetime. Tomas Hägg has argued that this choice of setting makes the work an important forerunner of the modern historical novel.

The discovery of five separate fragments of Chariton's novel at Oxyrhynchus and Karanis in Egypt attest to the popularity of Callirhoe. One fragment, carefully written on expensive parchment, suggests that some, at least, of Chariton's public were members of local elites.

== Editions ==
- D'Orville, J. P. (1750). ΧΑΡΙΤΩΝΟΣ Αφροδισιέως τῶν περὶ ΧΑΙΡΕΑΝ καὶ ΚΑΛΛΙΡΡΟΗΝ ΕΡΩΤΙΚΩΝ ΔΙΗΓΗΜΑΤΩΝ ΛΟΓΟΙ Η (in Greek). Amsterdam: Apud Petrus Mortier. The first printed edition. With Latin translation by Johann Jacob Reiske.
- Hirschig, W. A. (1856). "Charitonis Aphrodisiensis De Chǣrea et Callirrhoe" (PDF). Erotici Scriptores. Paris: Editore Ambrosio Firmin Didot. pp. 413–503. With a reprint of Reiske's Latin translation.
- Hercher, R. (1858–1859). Erotici Scriptores Graeci. Leipzig.
- Blake, W. E. (1938). Charitonis Aphrodisiensis De Chaerea et Callirhoe Amatoriarum Narrationum libri octo. Oxford: Clarendon Press.
- Molinié, G. (1989) [1979]. Chariton: Le Roman de Chairéas et Callirhoé. Collection des universités de France. revised by Alain Billault (2nd ed.). Paris: Belles Lettres. ISBN 2-251-00075-5. With French translation.
- Goold, G. P. (1995). Chariton: Callirhoe. Loeb Classical Library. Cambridge, MA: Harvard University Press. ISBN 0-674-99530-9. With English translation.
- Reardon, B. P. (2004). De Callirhoe Narrationes Amatoriae Chariton Aphrodisiensis. Bibliotheca scriptorum Graecorum et Romanorum Teubneriana. K.G. Saur. ISBN 3-598-71277-4. Reviewed in BMCR

=== English translations ===
- Anonymous (1764). The Loves of Chǣreas and Callirrhoe. London: printed for T. Becket and P. A. De Hondt.
- Blake, Warren E. (1939). Chariton's Chaereas and Callirhoe. Ann Arbor: University of Michigan Press.
- Reardon, Bryan P. (1989). "Chariton: Chǣreas and Callirhoe". In Bryan P. Reardon (ed.). Collected Ancient Greek Novels. Berkeley, CA: University of California Press. pp. 17–124. ISBN 0-520-04306-5.
- Goold, G. P. (1995). Chariton: Callirhoe. Loeb Classical Library. Cambridge, MA: Harvard University Press. ISBN 0-674-99530-9. With Greek text.
- Trzaskoma, Stephen M. (2010). Two Novels from Ancient Greece: Chariton's Callirhoe and Xenophon of Ephesos' An Ephesian Story. Indianapolis/Cambridge, MA: Hackett Publishing Company Inc. ISBN 978-1-60384-192-4.

== See also ==
Other ancient Greek novelists:

- Xenophon of Ephesus, The Ephesian Tale
- Achilles Tatius, Leucippe and Clitophon
- Heliodorus of Emesa, The Aethiopica
- Longus, Daphnis and Chloe
