= Ancient Greek novel =

Literary genre

Five ancient Greek novels or ancient Greek romances survive complete from antiquity: Chariton's Callirhoe (mid-1st century), Achilles Tatius' Leucippe and Clitophon (early 2nd century), Longus' Daphnis and Chloe (2nd century), Xenophon of Ephesus' Ephesian Tale (late 2nd century), and Heliodorus of Emesa's Aethiopica (3rd century). There are also numerous fragments preserved on papyrus or in quotations, and summaries in Bibliotheca by Photius, a 9th-century Ecumenical Patriarch. The titles of over twenty such ancient Greek romance novels are known, but most of them have only survived in an incomplete, fragmentary form. The unattributed Metiochus and Parthenope may be preserved by what appears to be a faithful Persian translation by the poet Unsuri. The Greek novel as a genre began in the first century CE, and flourished in the first four centuries; it is thus a product of the Roman Empire. The exact relationship between the Greek novel and the Latin novels of Petronius and Apuleius is debated, but both Roman writers are thought by most scholars to have been aware of and to some extent influenced by the Greek novels.

== Terminology ==
No ancient Greek term is known for the genre of prose fiction. Photius uses the word δραματικόν, a term already found in Aristotle's Poetics (1448b35; 1459a19: δραματικοὶ μῦθοι) and that can be translated as "dramatic, relative to plays". Photios uses it to describe the works by Heliodorus, Achilles Tatius, Iamblichus and Antonius Diogenes—Photius doesn't mention Chariton nor Longus:

- Bibl. 73: ἀνεγνώσθη Ἡλιοδώρου Αἰθιοπικόν. Ἔστι δὲ τὸ σύνταγμα δραματικόν ("Read: the Ethiopian stories by Heliodorus. This work is a novel");
- Bibl. 87: Ἀνεγνώσθη Ἀλεξανδρέως Ἀχιλλέως Τατίου τῶν περὶ Λευκίππην καὶ Κλειτοφῶντα λόγοι ηʹ. Ἔστι δὲ δραματικόν ("Read: eight books of History of Leucippe and Clitophon, by Achilles Tatius of Alexandria. It is a novel");
- Bibl. 94: ἀνεγνώσθη Ἰαμβλίχου δραματικόν ("Read: a novel by Iamblichus");
- Bibl. 166 (Antonius Diogenes), ἀνεγνώσθη Ἀντωνίου Διογένους τῶν ὑπὲρ Θούλην ἀπίστων λόγοι κδʹ. Δραματικὸν οἱ λόγοι ("Read: twenty-four books of the Incredible adventures beyond Thule, by Antonius Diogenes. These books are a novel");

Alternatively, the term δρᾶμα (noun, from the same stem as the adjective δραματικόν) has been proposed. Modern writers in English may refer to these works as "novels" or "romances", although those terms were invented for medieval and modern works. In other European languages, terms cognate with "romance" are used in French, German, Italian and Portuguese, while novela is used in Spanish.

== Genre ==
Most scholars agree that the five surviving Greek novels constitute a coherent if flexible genre, but no name for this genre is known from antiquity. Contemporary literary critics usually omit the extended prose narratives of antiquity from discussions of the novel. There are no clear distinctions of genre between the five 'romantic' novels and other works of Greek prose fiction, such as Lucian's True Story, the Alexander Romance and the Aesop Romance.

B.P. Reardon has the following qualifications to define a novel "narrative fiction in prose—imaginative, creative literature, sufficiently similar to what we call novels to justify the term here". This definition allows him to extend the category to include, in addition to the five canonical novels, Pseudo-Lucian's The Ass, Lucian's A True Story, Pseudo-Callisthenes' Alexander Romance, and the anonymously written The Story of Apollonius, King of Tyre.

Although the plots of the surviving novels appear to be relatively conventional, entailing the fulfilled heterosexual desire of a beautiful and usually virtuous young couple, this impression of uniformity and moralism may be an illusion created by later Christians, who decided which to copy for posterity. Writers now lost such as Lollianus (the author of Phoenician Tales) and Iamblichus seem to have been much more experimental and lurid. Even so, the surviving texts (arguably with the exception of Xenophon's Ephesian Tale) show great sophistication in their handling of character, narrative and intertextuality.

Two stories included by Reardon in his list of novels have survived only as summaries: Antonius Diogenes's The Wonders Beyond Thule and Iamblichus' Babylonian History. Both of these summaries are the work of Photios in his Bibliotheca.

== Influences ==
The influence of the novelists is demonstrable on Musaeus' Hero and Leander, the late antique epic by Nonnus titled Dionysiaca, Procopius, the Byzantine novel, and Byzantine historiography in general. Thanks in large part to Jacques Amyot's translations, they were rediscovered in early modern Europe, and played an influential role in the formation of the modern novel, particularly the "romance" variety.

== Modern reference editions ==
- Achilles Tatius:
  - Achilles Tatius (1955). Vilborg, E. (ed.). Leucippe and Clitophon. Stockholm: Almqvist & Wiksell.
  - Vilborg, E., ed. (1962). Achilles Tatius. Leucippe and Clitophon: A Commentary. Stockholm: Almqvist & Wiksell.
- Antonius Diogenes: Antonius Diogenes (2020). Schmedt, H. (ed.). Die unglaublichen Dinge jenseits von Thule. Millennium-Studien, 78. Berlin – Boston: De Gruyter. ISBN 978-3-11-058510-0. ISSN 1862-1139. LCCN 2019951646.
- Chariton: Chariton Aphrodisiensis (2004). Reardon, B. P. (ed.). De Callirhoe narrationes amatoriae. Bibliotheca Teubneriana. Munich – Leipzig: K. G. Saur.
- Heliodorus:
  - Héliodore (1935–1960). Rattenbury, R. M.; Lumb, T. W. (eds.). Les Éthiopiques. Vol. I–III. Paris: Les Belles Lettres.
  - Heliodorus (1938). Colonna, A. (ed.). Aethiopica. Romae: Typis Regiae officinae Polygraphicae.
- Iamblichus: Barbero, M., ed. (2015). I «Babyloniaca» di Giamblico. Testimonianze e frammenti. Minima Philologica. Series Graeca, 7. Alessandria: Edizioni Dell'Orso. ISBN 978-88-6274-639-7. ISSN 2611-5360.
- Longus: Longus (1994). Reeve, M. D. (ed.). Daphnis et Chloe. Bibliotheca Teubneriana (2nd ed.). Munich – Leipzig: K. G. Saur.
- Xenophon: Xenophon Ephesius (2005). O'Sullivan, J. N. (ed.). De Anthia et Abrocome Hephesiacorum libri V. Bibliotheca Teubneriana. Munich – Leipzig: K. G. Saur.

== Bibliography ==
- Futre Pinheiro, Marília P.; Nimis, Stephen A.; Fusillo, Massimo, eds. (2022). Modern literary theory and the ancient novel: poetics and rhetoric. Groningen: Barkhuis & Groningen University Library. ISBN 9789493194540.
- Hägg, T. (1983), The Novel in Antiquity, Berkeley, ISBN 0-520-07638-9.
- Reardon, B. P. (2008), Collected Ancient Greek Novels, University of California Press.
- Schmeling, G., ed. (2003), The Novel in the Ancient World (2nd ed.), Brill.
- Whitmarsh, T., ed. (2008), The Cambridge Companion to the Greek and Roman Novel, Cambridge University Press.
