= Longus =

Ancient Greek writer

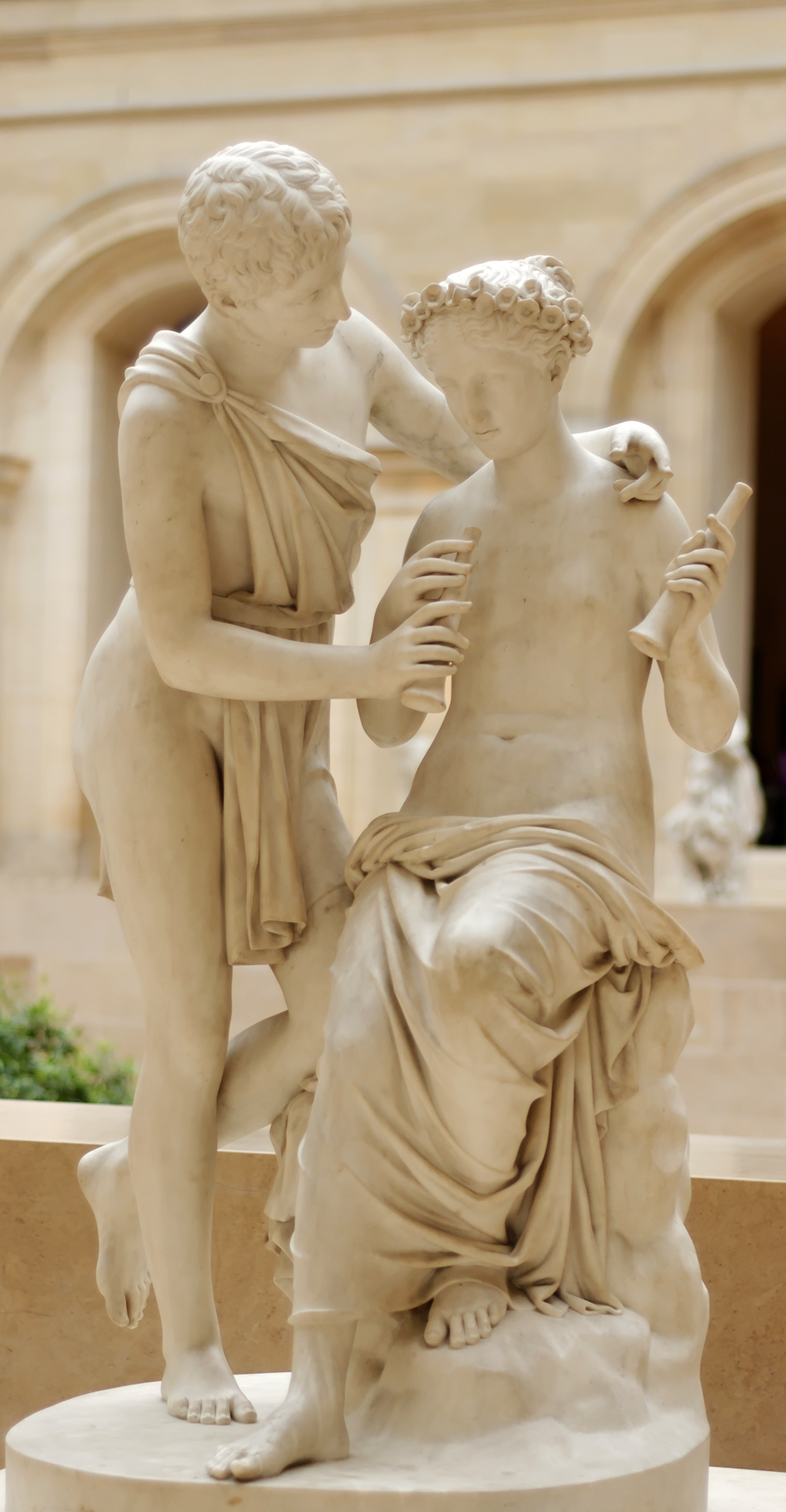
Daphnis and Chloe by Jean-Pierre Cortot

Longus, sometimes Longos (Greek: Λόγγος), was the author of an ancient Greek novel or romance, Daphnis and Chloe. Nothing is known of his life; it is assumed that he lived on the isle of Lesbos (setting for Daphnis and Chloe) during the 2nd century AD.

It has been suggested that the name Longus is merely a misinterpretation of the first word of Daphnis and Chloe's title Λεσβιακῶν ἐρωτικῶν λόγοι ("story of a Lesbian romance", "Lesbian" for "from Lesbos island") in the Florentine manuscript; EE Seiler observes that the best manuscript begins and ends with λόγου (not λόγγου) ποιμενικῶν.

If his name was really Longus, he was possibly a freedman of some Roman family which bore that name as a cognomen.

== See also ==
Other ancient Greek novelists:

- Chariton – The Loves of Chaereas and Callirhoe
- Xenophon of Ephesus – The Ephesian Tale
- Achilles Tatius – Leucippe and Clitophon
- Heliodorus of Emesa – The Aethiopica
