= Metiochus and Parthenope =

Ancient Greek novel

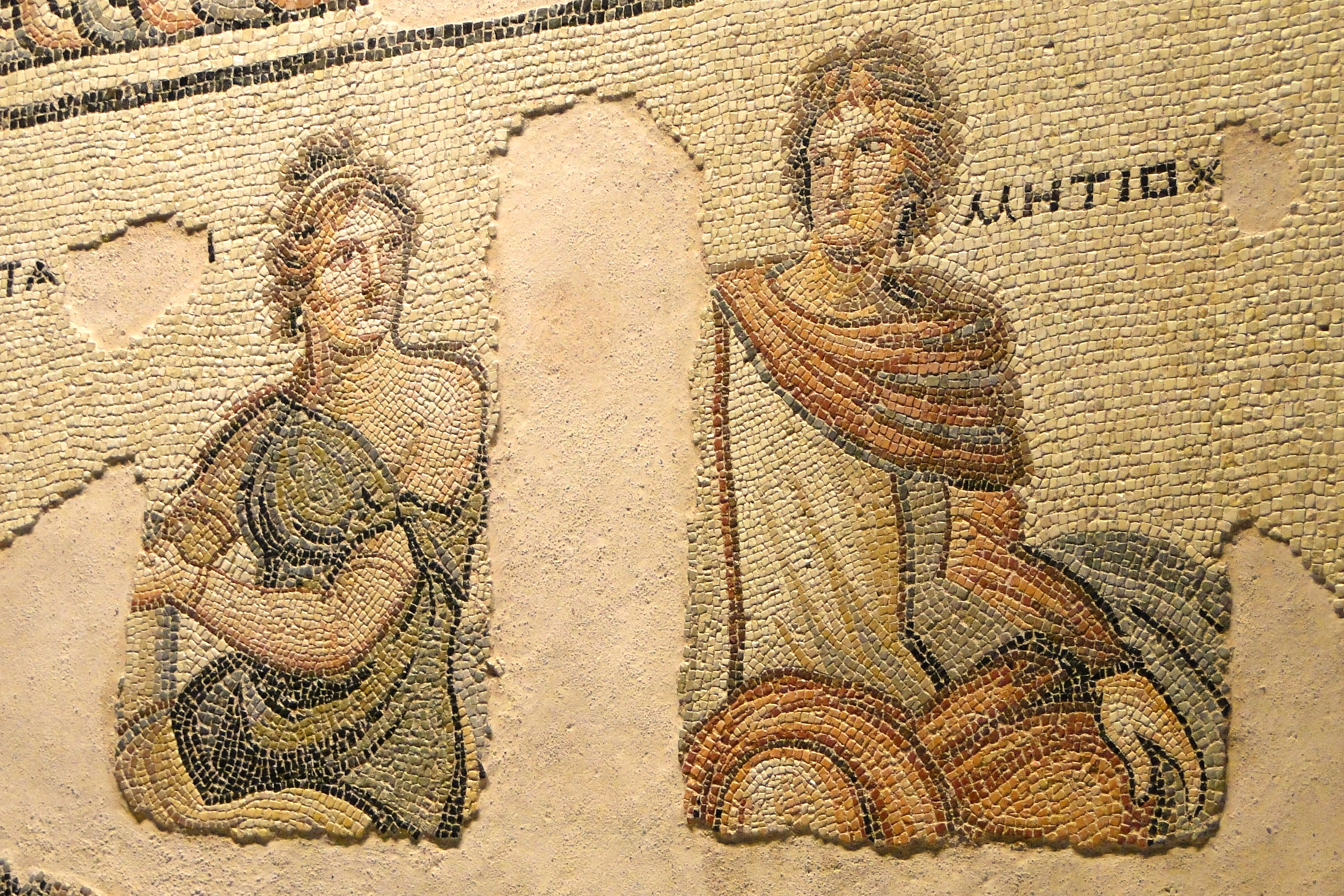
Metiochus and Parthenope in a mosaic found in Zeugma

Metiochus and Parthenope (Greek: Μητίοχος καὶ Παρθενόπη, Mētiokhos kai Parthenopē) is an ancient Greek novel that, in a translation by the eleventh-century poet ‘Unṣurī, also became the Persian romance epic Vāmiq u ‘Adhrā, and the basis for a wide range of stories about the 'lover and the virgin' in medieval and modern Islamic cultures.

== Greek text ==
Metiochus and Parthenope is similar in style to Chariton's Chaereas and Callirhoe, from the first century BC or AD, and so is presumed to be equally old, making it one of the first prose novels in the Western literary tradition. The text survives only in small fragments of papyrus from Egypt, but references in Greek literature of the Roman period, a Syrian mosaic of c. 200 depicting the protagonists, and another from Zeugma, Commagene, shows the story's continued importance during the Roman period.

Drawing on surviving sources, Hägg and Utan reconstruct the following plot (The story refers to historical figures, but is anachronistic and fundamentally fictional.): Metiochus is the eldest son of Miltiades. However, his stepmother Hegesipyle plots against him in favour of her own children. So, along with his friend Theophanes, he flees his home (on the Thracian Chersonese), seeking the court of his distant relative Polycrates on Samos. There he meets Polycrates's daughter Parthenope at the temple of Hera. They fall instantly in love. Polycrates invites Metiochus to a symposium, and the discussions on love at this event are the main surviving part of the Greek text.

== Persian text ==
For centuries, it was known that ‘Unṣurī had composed a poem called Vāmiq u ‘Adhrā, but it was thought lost. In the 1950s, however, the Pakistani scholar Mohammad Shafi identified fragments of the text in the binding of a theological manuscript produced in Herat in AH 526 (1132 AD), revealing 380 couplets (abyāt) of the poem. Another 151 couplets are quoted in Persian lexical works, some or all of which may come from this poem.

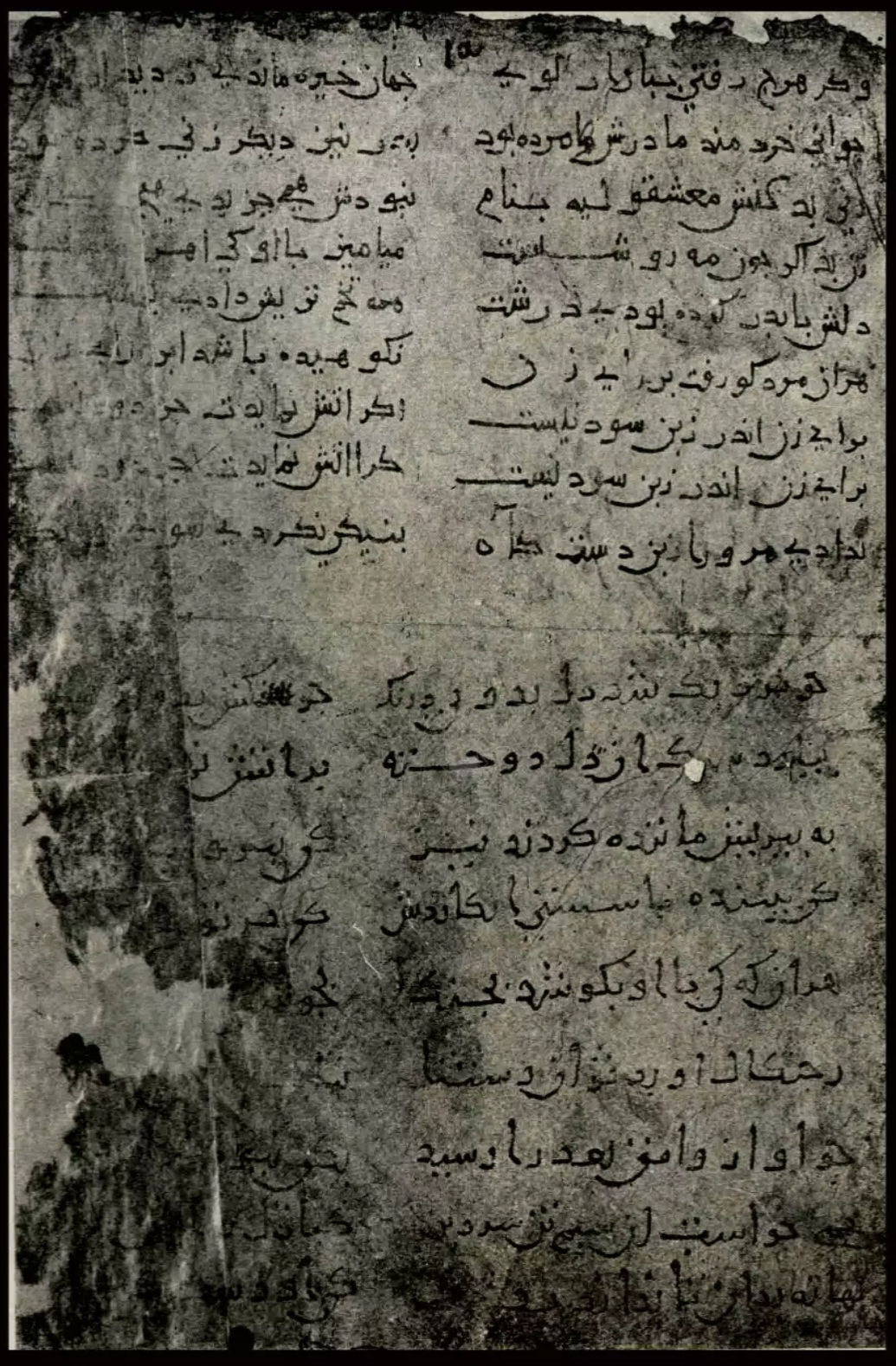
One of the surviving fragments of Vāmiq u ‘Adhrā, discovered in Pakistan in the 1950s.

Vāmiq means 'the lover' and ‘Adhrā means 'virgin' in Arabic (corresponding to the connotations of virginity in the name Parthenope, from Greek parthenos 'young girl, virgin'), but many other names in ‘Unṣurī's text are transposed from the Greek, demonstrating derivation from Metiochus and Parthenope, probably via an Arabic translation. In the tenth century, Ibn al-Nadīm records that Sahl b. Hārūn (d. 830 AD), secretary to Caliph al-Ma'mūn in Baghdad, composed a work of the same title. This must derive from the Greek text, whether by direct translation or through an intermediary — conceivably even an earlier Persian translation. Meanwhile al-Bīrūnī (d. c. 1051) claimed to have translated an Arabic work of this name into New Persian. Al-Bīrūnī's text might, then, have been the source for ‘Unṣurī's poem.

By the fifteenth century, Vāmiq u ‘Adhrā had become proverbial names of lovers in the Persian world, and a huge number of stories about the 'lover and the virgin' circulated in Islamicate literature.

== Editions and translations ==
- Thomas Hägg and Bo Utas, The Virgin and her Lover: Fragments of an Ancient Greek Novel and a Persian Epic Poem, Brill Studies in Middle Eastern Literatures, 30 (Leiden: Brill, 2003)
