= Thomas Underdown =

Thomas Underdown, also spelled Underdowne (fl. 1566 - 1577), was a translator. He translated the Æthiopian History of Heliodorus in 1569, and the Ibis of Ovid (1577). The Æthiopian History has been called "the ancestor in a direct line of the Novel of Adventure," and praised for anticipating every artifice of the historical novel.

Underdown was an advocate for literature as a moral instrument, saying that the Æthiopian History was superior as an action story because people are punished for their misdeeds. By contrast, chivalric romance permitted pointless murder and "unlawful lust."

The first (1569) edition of Underdown's translation was dedicated to Edward de Vere, 17th Earl of Oxford. The book went on to exercise a widespread influence on Elizabethan drama and prose romance. In 1587, the year of the 2nd or 3rd edition, anti-theatrical propagandist Stephen Gosson remarked that Underdown's book had "beene thoroughly ransackt, to furnish the Playehouses in London." Among the early works markedly influenced by the translation is Robert Greene's Pandosto (1588), a major source for Shakespeare's Winter's Tale, and Philip Sidney's Arcadia (1581–86). So strong was the influence of Underdown's translation on Sidney that 16th century commentator Marechel referred to Sidney as the "Heliodore d'Angleterre." According to Moses Hadas, in the introduction to his translation of the Aethiopica, "in construction and a hundred details Sidney patiently follows Heliodorus, and the Arcadia was the principle model for Sidney's successors."

Although the book's influence on Shakespeare is more diffuse, elements of Underdown's translation can be traced in a number of plays, prominent among them Cymbeline.
