= Prince of Tyre =

Prince of Tyre may refer to:

- Amalric, Lord of Tyre (c. 1272–1310), ruler in Tyre (now Lebanon)
- Pericles, Prince of Tyre, play written at least in part by William Shakespeare

== See also ==
- Apollonius of Tyre
