= Heliodorus of Emesa =

3rd-/4th-century Greco-Roman writer

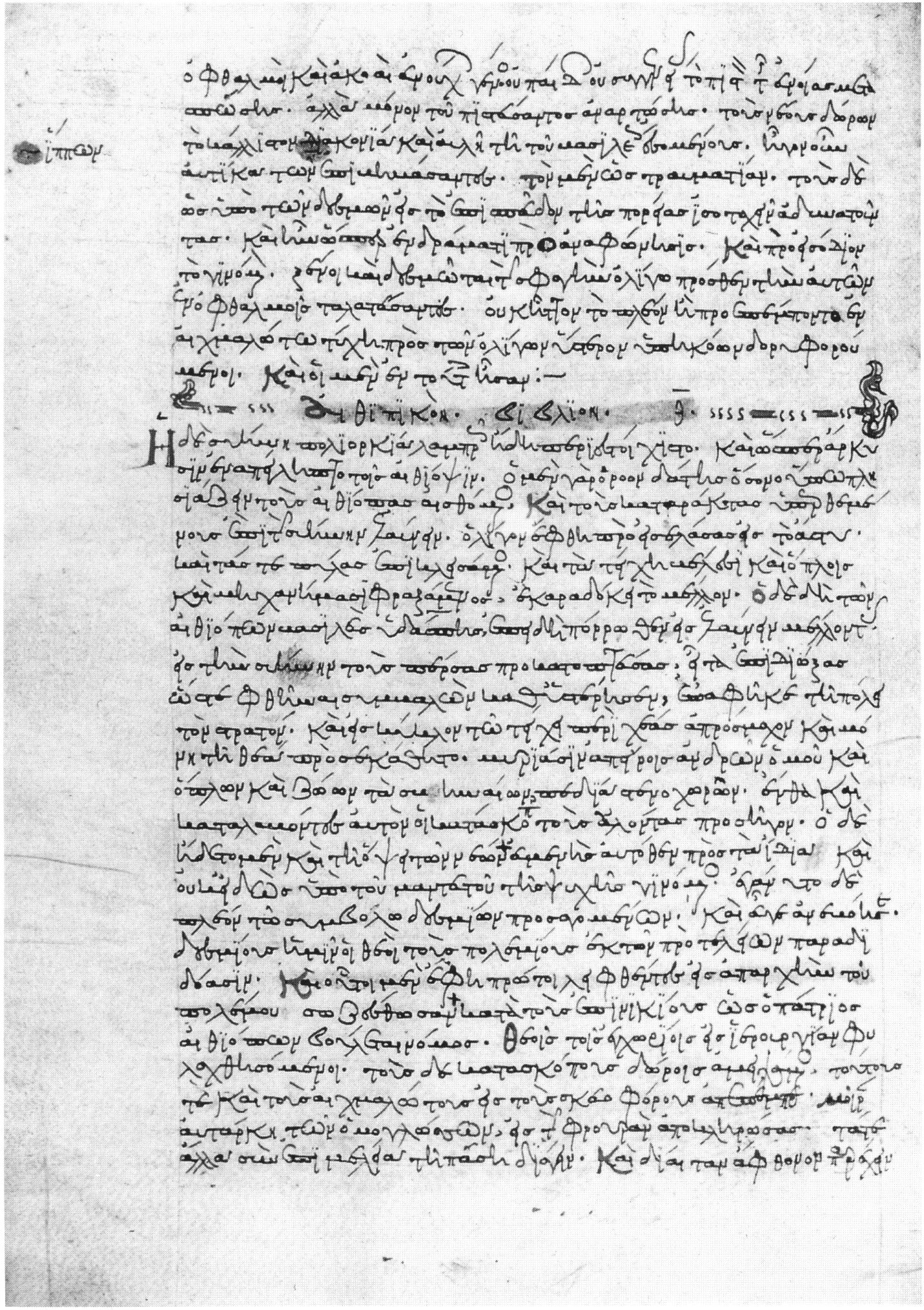
A manuscript of the Aethiopica (Venice, Biblioteca Nazionale Marciana, Gr. 410, fol. 94v)

Heliodorus Emesenus or Heliodorus of Emesa (Ancient Greek: Ἡλιόδωρος ὁ Ἐμεσηνός) is the author of the ancient Greek novel called the Aethiopica (Αἰθιοπικά) or Theagenes and Chariclea (Θεαγένης καὶ Χαρίκλεια), which has been dated to the 220s or 370s AD.

== Identification ==
He identifies himself at the end of his work as

a Phoenician from Emesa [modern Homs, Syria], of the line of Helios [also translated as: 'from the race of the sun'], Theodosius' son Heliodorus

According to Tim Whitmarsh, 'from the race of the sun' "looks like a claim to hereditary priesthood," though "uncertainties" remain. According to The Cambridge History of Classical Literature, "the personal link here established between the writer and Helios has also a literary purpose, as has Calasiris' flashback narrative". The later tradition maintaining that Heliodorus had become a Christian bishop is likely fictional. (Note: The 5th-century Socrates of Constantinople identifies the author of the Aethiopica with a Heliodorus, bishop of Trikka, but the name Heliodorus was a common one. In the 14th century, Nikephoros Kallistos Xanthopoulos expanded this narrative, relating that the work was written in the early years of this bishop before he became a Christian and that, when forced either to disown it or resign his bishopric, he preferred resignation. Most scholars reject this identification.)

Quoting Richard L. Hunter,

The Emesenes were a culturally complex group, including Arab, Phoenician and Greek elements, and, since the third century at any rate, having a connection with the Roman imperial household (the empress Julia Domna was from Emesa, as was the cult of Elagabal which inspired the emperor Heliogabalus).

== See also ==
- Emesene dynasty

Other ancient Greek novelists:

- Chariton – The Loves of Chaereas and Callirhoe
- Xenophon of Ephesus – The Ephesian Tale
- Achilles Tatius – Leucippe and Clitophon
- Longus – Daphnis and Chloe

== Bibliography ==
- Chisholm, Hugh, ed. (1911). "Heliodorus" . Encyclopædia Britannica. Vol. 13 (11th ed.). Cambridge University Press. p. 223.
- Heliodoros, Aithiopika, ed. Robert Mantle Rattenbury, Thomas Wallace Lumb (Paris: Les Belles Lettres, three volumes, 1935–1943)
