= Théagène et Chariclée =

Opera by Henri Desmarets

Théagène et Chariclée, originally spelt Théagène et Cariclée (Theagenes and Chariclea), is an opera by the French composer Henri Desmarets, first performed at the Académie Royale de Musique (the Paris Opera) on 12 April 1695. It takes the form of a tragédie en musique in a prologue and five acts. The libretto, by Duché de Vancy, is based on the ancient Greek novel Aethiopica by Heliodorus.

== Sources ==
- (in French) Libretto at "Livres baroques"
- (in French) Félix Clément and Pierre Larousse Dictionnaire des Opéras, Paris, 1881, page 658.
