= Jacques Amyot =

French bishop and scholar (1513–1593)

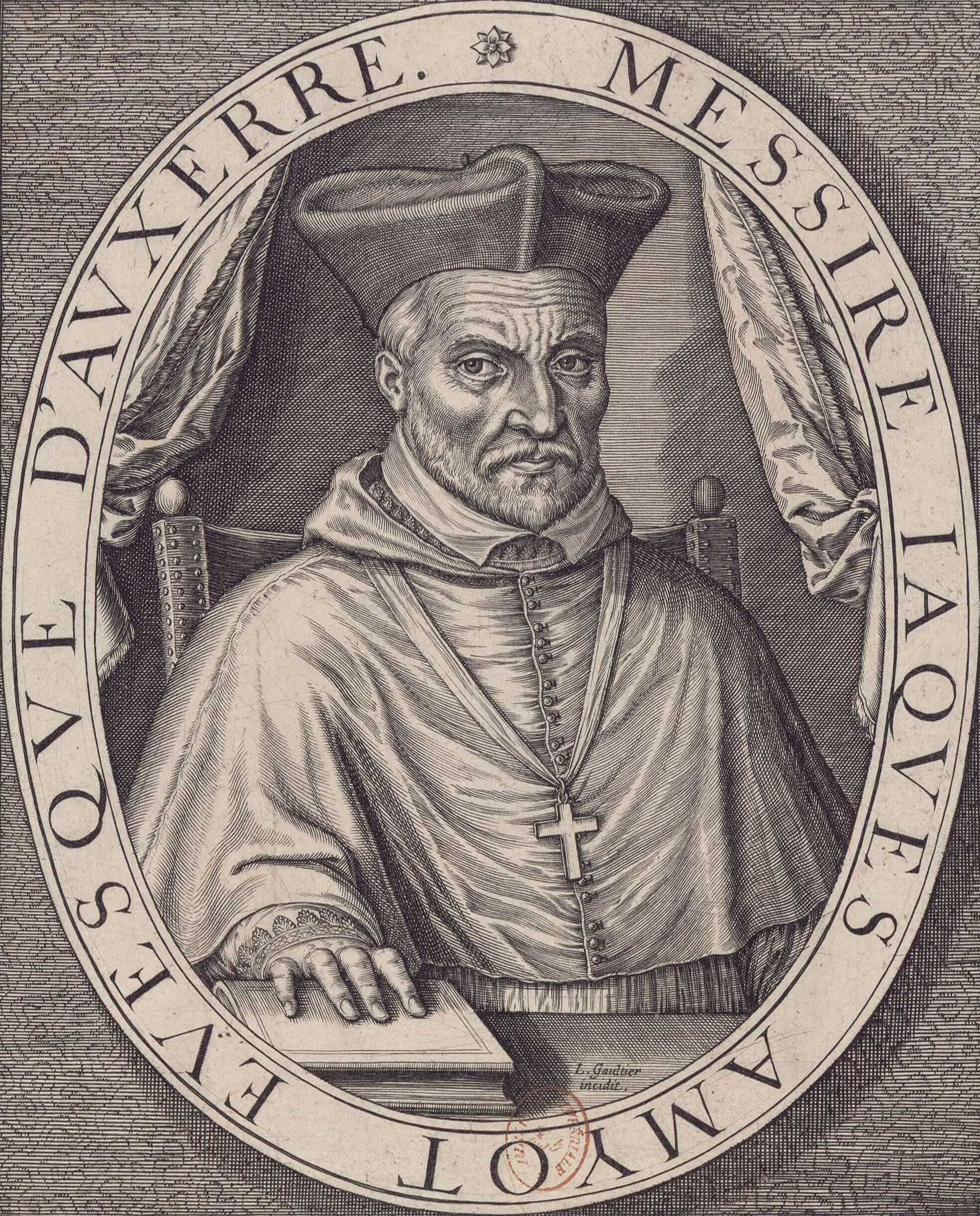
Jacques Amyot. Portrait by Léonard Gaultier.

Jacques Amyot (French: [ʒak amjo]; 30 October 1513 – 6 February 1593), French Renaissance bishop, scholar, writer and translator, was born of poor parents, at Melun.

== Biography ==
Amyot found his way to the University of Paris, where he supported himself by serving some of the richer students. He was nineteen when he became M.A. at Paris, and later he graduated doctor of civil law at Bourges. Through Jacques Colure (or Colin), abbot of St. Ambrose in Bourges, he obtained a tutorship in the family of a secretary of state. By the secretary he was recommended to Margaret of France, Duchess of Berry, and through her influence was made professor of Greek and Latin at Bourges. Here he translated the Æthiopica of Heliodorus (1547), for which he was rewarded by Francis I with the abbey of Bellozane.

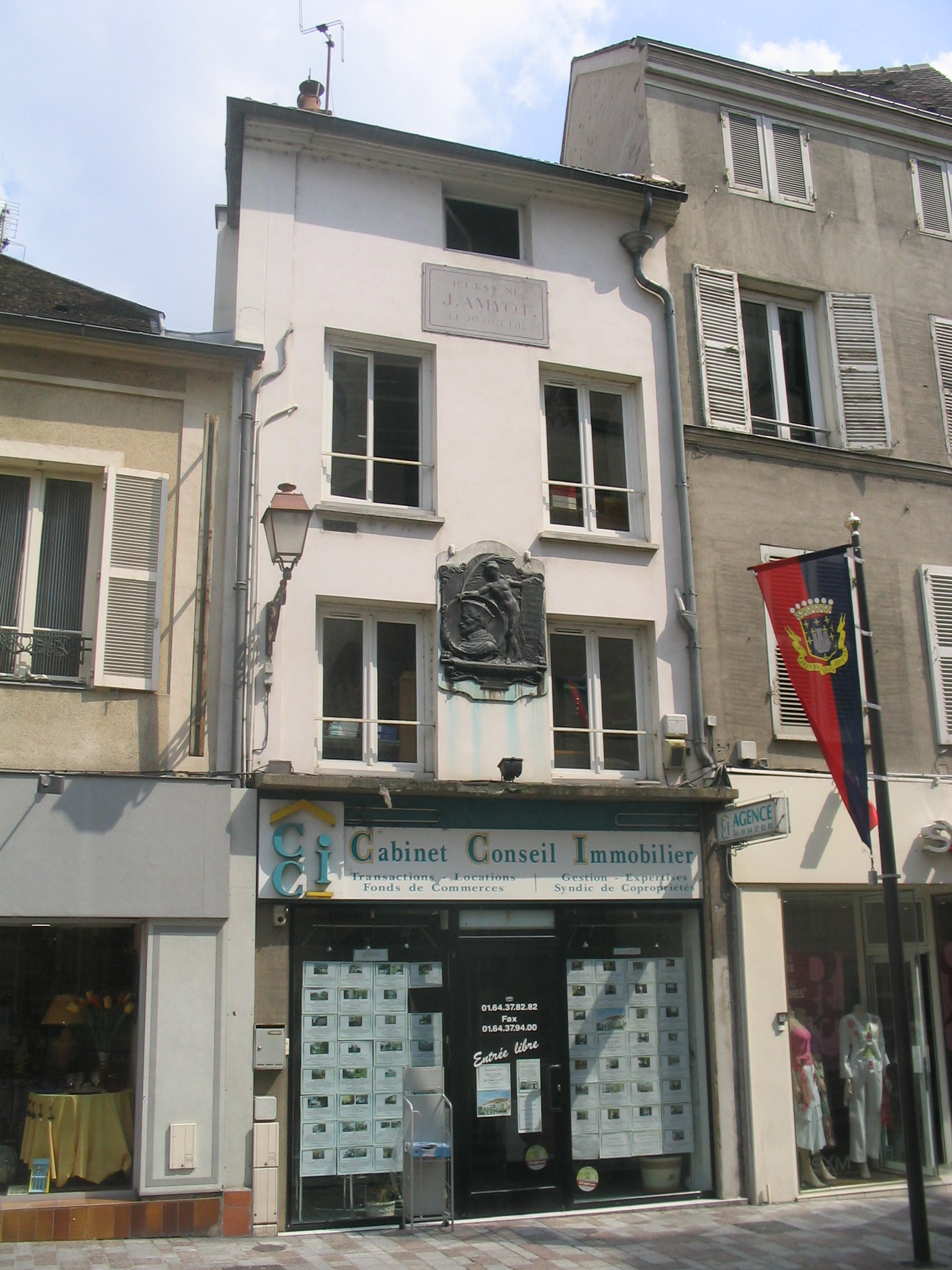
Native house of Jacques Amyot at Melun.

He was thus enabled to go to Italy to study the Vatican text of Plutarch, on the translation of whose Lives he had been some time engaged. On the way he turned aside on a mission to the Council of Trent. Returning home, he was appointed tutor to the sons of Henry II, by one of whom (Charles IX) he was afterwards made grand almoner (1561) and by the other (Henry III) was appointed, in spite of his plebeian origin, commander of the Order of the Holy Spirit.

Pius V promoted him to the bishopric of Auxerre in 1570, and here he continued to live in comparative quiet, repairing his cathedral and perfecting his translations, for the rest of his days, though troubled towards the close by the insubordination and revolts of his clergy. He was a devout and conscientious churchman, and had the courage to stand by his principles. It is said that he advised the chaplain of Henry III to refuse absolution to the king after the murder of the Guise princes. He was, nevertheless, suspected of approving the crime. His house was plundered, and he was compelled to leave Auxerre for some time. He died bequeathing, it is said, 1200 crowns to the hospital at Orléans for the twelve deniers he received there when "poor and naked" on his way to Paris.

He translated seven books of Diodorus Siculus (1554), the Daphnis and Chloë of Longus (1559) and the Opera Moralia of Plutarch (1572). His vigorous and idiomatic version of Plutarch, Vies des hommes illustres, was published in 1558, later translated into English by Sir Thomas North, and supplied Shakespeare with materials for his Roman plays. Montaigne said of him, "I give the palm to Jacques Amyot over all our French writers, not only for the simplicity and purity of his language in which he surpasses all others, nor for his constancy to so long an undertaking, nor for his profound learning ... but I am grateful to him especially for his wisdom in choosing so valuable a work." However, Dr. Guy Patin commented (translation from French), "It is said that M. de Meziriac had corrected eight thousand mistakes in his Amyot, and that Amyot did not have good copies, or that he had not understood Plutarch's Greek well."

It was indeed to Plutarch that Amyot devoted his attention. His other translations were subsidiary. The version of Diodorus he did not publish, although the manuscript had been discovered by him. Amyot took great pains to find and interpret correctly the best authorities, but the interest of his books today lies in the style. His translation reads like an original work. The personal method of Plutarch appealed to a generation addicted to memoirs and incapable of any general theory of history. Amyot's book, therefore, obtained an immense popularity, and exercised great influence over successive generations of French writers.
