= Apollonius of Tyre =

Hero of a short ancient literary work

Apollonius of Tyre is the hero of a short ancient novel, popular in the Middle Ages. Existing in numerous forms in many languages, all are thought to derive from either an ancient Greek or Latin version now lost.

== Plot summary ==
In the two oldest Latin versions, the eponymous hero seeks to marry the daughter of a certain king Antiochus of Antioch. To be allowed to marry her, he has to solve a riddle. By solving this riddle, Appollonius uncovers the incestuous relationship of Antiochus and his daughter. Appollonius is then hunted down by Antiochus and has to flee from Antioch. While fleeing Apollonius is shipwrecked and he marries the princess of the country he arrived at. Later, Antiochus and his daughter die by being struck by lightning which leads Appollonius and his wife to travel to Antioch. On the way there, Appollonius' wife and daughter end up in different lands, and Appollonius thinks them both dead, he is eventually reunited with his family through unlikely circumstances or intercession by God. The major themes are the punishment of inappropriate lust and the ultimate rewards of love and fidelity.

== Origins (Latin and Greek?) ==
The story is first mentioned in Latin by Venantius Fortunatus in his Carmina (Bk. vi. 8, 11. 5–6) during the late 6th century; it is conjectured by some, based on similarities with the Ephesian Tale of Xenophon of Ephesus and the presence of idioms awkward in Latin but typical in Greek, that the original was a Greek romance of the third century. Some fragments of Greek romance, however, point to the possibility of an even older date. The earliest manuscripts of the tale date from the 9th or 10th century, but they record a Latin version from late antiquity. Thus they show an intersection of Greek and Roman as well as pre-Christian and Christian influences. Accordingly, the work is classed with the ancient Greek romance novels.

Other scholars, among who was Elimar Klebs, believe the story has a Latin origin. Klebs bases this idea on the language, the names and inscriptions in the Historia Apollonii Regis Tyri, which according to him are Latin-like, as well as the customs displayed in the novel, which he believes suggest Roman culture. Klebs situates the original version in the third century. The hypothesis of a Greek origin seems currently to be the most common under scholars.

Some scholars hold that the riddles with which the king tests the hero in many versions may be a later addition: ten derive from the c. fourth-century Latin riddle-collection attributed to Symphosius. Other scholars believe the incest story to have been a later addition as well, though others, including Elizabeth Archibald, see it as an integral thematic element of the tale.

The most widespread Latin versions are those of Godfrey of Viterbo, who incorporated it into his Pantheon of 1185 as if it were actual history, Historia Apollonii regis Tyri and a version in the Gesta Romanorum.

== Translations ==
'Fifty to a hundred versions' of the story are known from antiquity into the early modern period, mostly European, including texts in English, Dutch, German, Danish, French, Spanish, Italian, Portuguese, Polish, Russian, Hungarian, Greek, and Latin.

The earliest vernacular translation is an incomplete Old English prose text from the 11th century, sometimes called the first English novel. The existence of this unique text is unusual, as secular prose fiction from that time is extremely rare. The manuscript copy may only have survived because it was bound into a book together with Archbishop Wulfstan's homilies. Various versions of the tale were later written in most European languages.

A notable English version is in the eighth book of John Gower's Confessio Amantis (1390), which uses it as an exemplum against lust. It is described as being based on Pantheon, but it contains many details that work does not but the old Historia does.

Its numerous vernacular versions, along with the Latin ones, attest to its popularity throughout the Middle Ages. It appears in an old Danish ballad collected in Danmarks gamle Folkeviser.

Robert Copland translated from the French the romance of Kynge Appolyne of Thyre (W. de Worde, 1510).

== Later versions and influence ==
The story was retold in thirteenth-century Castilian as Libro de Apolonio. It is also a major inspiration of the chanson de geste Jordain de Blaivies.

William Shakespeare and George Wilkins's play Pericles, Prince of Tyre was based in part on Gower's version, with the change of name probably inspired by Philip Sidney's Arcadia. Apollonius of Tyre was also a source for his plays Twelfth Night and The Comedy of Errors.
