= Lollianus =

Lollianus (sometimes rendered in English as Lollian) is a Roman personal name which may refer to many figures of classical antiquity, including:

- Ulpius Cornelius Laelianus (Laelian), sometimes incorrectly called "Lollianus", emperor of the Gallic Empire in 269.
- Lucius Hedius Rufus Lollianus Avitus, consul in consul AD 114.
- Lucius Hedius Rufus Lollianus Avitus, consul in AD 144.
- Quintus Hedius Rufus Lollianus Gentianus, suffect consul around AD 187.
- Publius Hordeonius Lollianus, 2nd century philosopher and orator
- Quintus Flavius Maesius Egnatius Lollianus Mavortius, consul in 355 AD.
- Lollianus, 2nd century writer and author of the Phoinikika (Phoenician Tales).
- St. Lollianus, one of the Seven Martyrs of Samosata, crucified with Saint Hipparchus and Philotheus, Abibus, James, Paregrus and Romanus by the emperor Maximian in 297.
