= Callirhoe (novel) =

Ancient Greek novel by Chariton

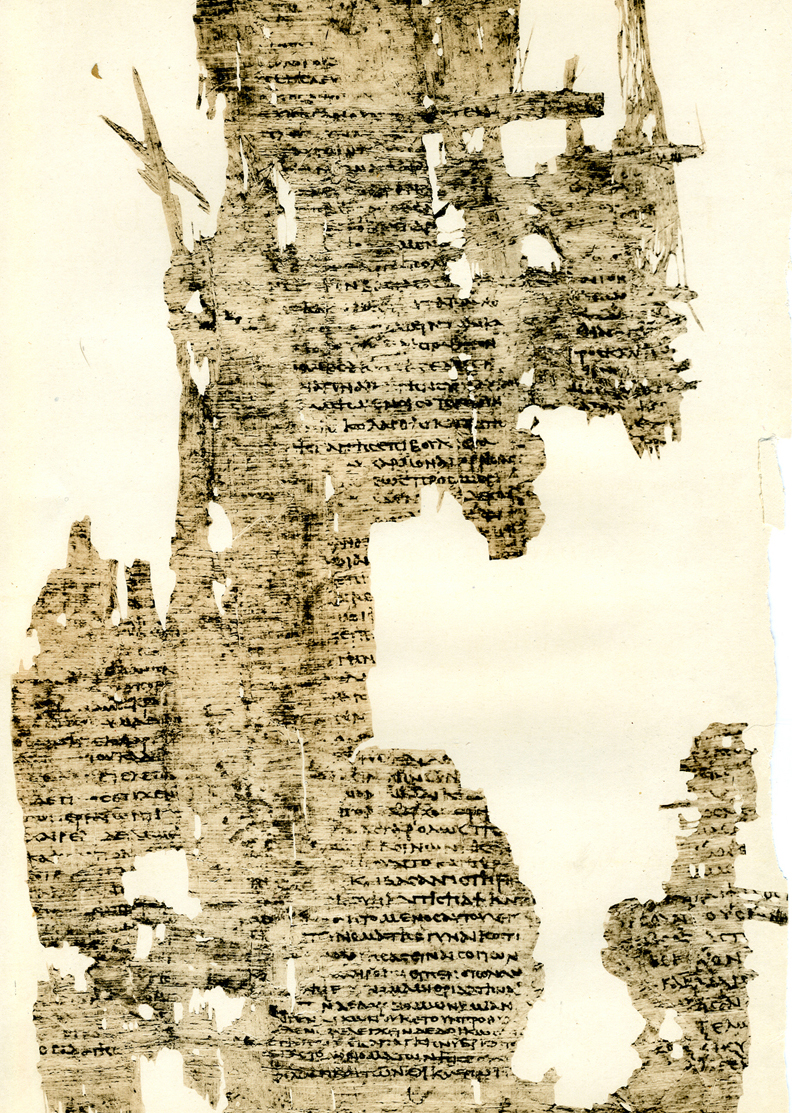
- A second- or third-century AD papyrus of the Callirhoe from Karanis (P.Fay. 1)
- Author: Chariton
- Original title: Καλλιρρόη
- Language: Ancient Greek
- Genre: Ancient Greek novel, historical fiction
- Set in: Syracuse, Miletus, Tyre, c. 400 BC
- Published: Mid-1st century AD
- Media type: Manuscript

Callirhoe (Ancient Greek: Καλλιρρόη, romanized: Kallirrhoē; also Chaereas and Callirhoe, an alternate and slightly less well attested title in the manuscript tradition) is an Ancient Greek novel by Chariton, that exists in one somewhat unreliable manuscript from the 13th century. It was not published until the 18th century and remained dismissed until the twentieth. It nevertheless gives insight into the development of ancient prose fiction and Hellenic culture within the Roman Empire. It is one of the five largely complete Ancient Greek novels that still exist today.

Evidence of fragments of the text on papyri suggests that the novel may have been written in the mid 1st century AD, making it the oldest surviving complete ancient prose romance and the only one to make use of apparent historiographical features for background verisimilitude and structure, in conjunction with elements of Greek mythology, as Callirhoë is frequently compared to Aphrodite and Ariadne and Chaereas to numerous heroes, both implicitly and explicitly. As the fiction takes place in the past, and historical figures interact with the plot, Callirhoe may be understood as the first historical novel; it was later imitated by Xenophon of Ephesus and Heliodorus of Emesa, among others.

== Plot outline ==
The story is set in the Classical Greek Mediterranean, c. 400 BC. In Syracuse, Chaereas (Χαιρέας) falls madly in love with the supernaturally beautiful Callirhoe ('beautiful river'). She is the daughter of Hermocrates, a hero of the Peloponnesian War and the most important political figure of Syracuse, thus setting the narrative in time and social milieu. Her beauty overawes crowds, like an earthly counterpart of Aphrodite. They are married, but when her many disappointed suitors successfully conspire to trick Chaereas into thinking she is unfaithful, he kicks her so hard that she falls over as if dead. There is a funeral, and she is shut up in a tomb, but then it turns out she was only in a coma, and wakes up in time to scare the pirates who have opened the tomb to rob it; they recover quickly and take her to sell as a slave in Miletus, where her new master, Dionysius, falls in love with her and marries her, she being afraid to mention that she is already married (and pregnant by Chaereas). As a result, Dionysius believes Callirhoe's son to be his own.

Meanwhile, Chaereas has heard she is alive, and has gone looking for her, but is himself captured and enslaved, and yet they both come to the attention of Artaxerxes, the Great King of Persia, who must decide who is her rightful husband, but is thinking about acquiring her for himself. When war erupts, Chaereas successfully storms the Persian stronghold of Tyre on behalf of the Egyptian rebels, and then wins a naval victory against the Persians, after which the original married couple are reunited. Callirhoe writes to Dionysius, telling him to bring up her son and send him to Syracuse when he grows up. Chaereas and Callirhoe return in triumph to Syracuse, where Chaereas sums up the plot to Syracuse and Callirhoe offers prayers in private and off-stage to the instigator of the narrative, Aphrodite.

== Historical basis ==
Several characters from Callirhoe can be identified with figures from history, although their portrayal is not always historically accurate. Hermocrates was a real Syracusan general, and did have a daughter (her name is unknown), who married Dionysius I of Syracuse. This Dionysius was tyrant of Syracuse from 405 to 367 BC and not a resident of Miletus. However, Callirhoe's expectation that her son will return to Syracuse after being brought up as Dionysius' own has been connected to the fact that the historical Dionysius I was succeeded in Syracuse by his son, Dionysius II. The historical daughter of Hermocrates died after a violent attack by soldiers; that Callirhoe merely appears to be dead after being kicked by Chaereas has been seen as a deliberate change allowing Chariton "to resurrect her for adventures abroad".

Chariton's Artaxerxes represents Artaxerxes II of Persia. Since Hermocrates died in 407 BC and Artaxerxes did not come to the throne until 404 BC, Chariton is anachronistic in having Hermocrates alive during Artaxerxes' reign. The hero Chaereas is not a historical figure, although his name recalls Chabrias, an Athenian general who fought in an Egyptian revolt against Persia in about 360 BC. His capture of Tyre may be based on that by Alexander the Great in 332 BC.

Despite the liberties Chariton took with historical fact, he clearly aimed to place his story in a period well before his own lifetime. Tomas Hägg has argued that this choice of setting makes the work an important forerunner of the modern historical novel.

== Style and influences ==
There are echoes of Herodotus, Thucydides, Xenophon, and other historical and biographical writers from the ancient world. The most frequent intertexts are the Homeric epics. The novel is told in a linear manner; after a brief first person introduction by Chariton, the narrator uses the third person. Much of the novel is told in direct speech, revealing the importance of oratory and rhetorical display (as in the presentation before the King of Persia) and perhaps as well the influence of New Comedy. Dramatic monologues are also used to reveal the conflicted states of the characters' emotions and fears (what should Callirhoe do, given that she is pregnant and alone?). The novel also has some amusing insights into ancient culture (for instance, the pirates decide to sell Callirhoe in Miletus rather than in the equally wealthy Athens, because they considered Athenians to be litigious busybodies who would ask too many questions).

The discovery of five separate fragments of Chariton's novel at Oxyrhynchus and Karanis in Egypt attest to the popularity of Callirhoe. One fragment, carefully written on expensive parchment, suggests that some, at least, of Chariton's public were members of local elites.

== Editions ==
- D'Orville, Jacques Philippe (1750). ΧΑΡΙΤΩΝΟΣ Αφροδισιέως τῶν περὶ ΧΑΙΡΕΑΝ καὶ ΚΑΛΛΙΡΡΟΗΝ ΕΡΩΤΙΚΩΝ ΔΙΗΓΗΜΑΤΩΝ ΛΟΓΟΙ Η (in Greek). Amsterdam: Apud Petrus Mortier. The first printed edition. With Latin translation by Johann Jacob Reiske.
- Hirschig, Wilhelm Adrian (1856). "Charitonis Aphrodisiensis De Chǣrea et Callirrhoe" (PDF). Erotici Scriptores. Paris: Editore Ambrosio Firmin Didot. pp. 413–503. With a reprint of Reiske's Latin translation.
- Hercher, Rudolf (1858–1859). Erotici Scriptores Graeci. Leipzig.
- Blake, Warren E. (1938). Charitonis Aphrodisiensis De Chaerea et Callirhoe Amatoriarum Narrationum libri octo. Oxford: Clarendon Press.
- Molinié, Georges (1989) [1979]. Chariton: Le Roman de Chairéas et Callirhoé. Collection des universités de France. revised by Alain Billault (2nd ed.). Paris: Belles Lettres. ISBN 2-251-00075-5. With French translation.
- Goold, G. P. (1995). Chariton: Callirhoe. Loeb Classical Library. Cambridge, MA: Harvard University Press. ISBN 0-674-99530-9. With English translation.
- Reardon, Bryan P. (2004). De Callirhoe Narrationes Amatoriae Chariton Aphrodisiensis. Bibliotheca scriptorum Graecorum et Romanorum Teubneriana. K.G. Saur. ISBN 3-598-71277-4. Reviewed in BMCR
- Nason, V. (2025). Caritone: Calliroe L'Afrodite di Siracusa. Göttingen: Atticus. ISBN 978-3-96925-020-4. Ancient Greek with Italian translation.
- Nason, V. (2025). Caritone: Calliroe L'Afrodite di Siracusa. Göttingen: Atticus. ISBN 978-3-96925-019-8. Italian translation.

=== English translations ===
- Anonymous (1764). The Loves of Chǣreas and Callirrhoe. London: printed for T. Becket and P. A. De Hondt.
- Blake, Warren E. (1939). Chariton's Chaereas and Callirhoe. Ann Arbor: University of Michigan Press.
- Reardon, Bryan P. (1989). "Chariton: Chǣreas and Callirhoe". In Bryan P. Reardon (ed.). Collected Ancient Greek Novels. Berkeley, CA: University of California Press. pp. 17–124. ISBN 0-520-04306-5.
- Goold, G. P. (1995). Chariton: Callirhoe. Loeb Classical Library. Cambridge, MA: Harvard University Press. ISBN 0-674-99530-9. With Greek text.
- Trzaskoma, Stephen M. (2010). Two Novels from Ancient Greece: Chariton's Callirhoe and Xenophon of Ephesos' An Ephesian Story. Indianapolis/Cambridge, MA: Hackett Publishing Company Inc. ISBN 978-1-60384-192-4.
