= Robert Rattenbury =

British philologist (1901–1970)

Robert Rattenbury

Robert Mantle Rattenbury (9 December 1901 – 29 July 1970) was an English classical scholar and Registrary of the University of Cambridge.

His most important publication was an edition of the Aethiopica of Heliodorus of Emesa, in three volumes, with notes in French. He was editor of The Classical Review and a contributor to the Oxford Classical Dictionary.

== Early life ==
Rattenbury was a son of John Ernest Rattenbury, a doctor of divinity, one of the leading Methodist evangelists and preachers of his day, who served as President of the National Free Church Council.

He was educated at Westminster School, where in 1919 he played at outside right in the school's First XI for soccer. He went on to Trinity College, Cambridge, gaining First Class Honours in the Classical Tripos.

== Career ==
In 1926 Rattenbury was elected as a fellow of Trinity College and in 1953 as Registrary of the university, meaning as head of its administration.

Between 1935 and 1938, Rattenbury and T. W. Lumb published in Paris an edition of the Aethiopica of Heliodorus of Emesa, in three volumes, with critical notes in French. These were later translated into English and the work was republished in Ann Arbor in 1957.

At Trinity, Rattenbury was the supervisor of Geoffrey Kirk, and an obituary of Kirk by Hugh Lloyd-Jones says of Rattenbury that he was "a sound scholar but by no means an inspiring teacher". When in 1940 Kirk said he was leaving to join the Navy, Rattenbury remarked: "Good Heavens! Well, I don't suppose I shall be seeing you again!" Nevertheless, Kirk returned to Cambridge at the end of the war and went on to become Regius Professor of Greek there.

By 1946, Rattenbury was editor of The Classical Review, the journal of the Classical Association.

At the time of the Hungarian Revolution of 1956, two Cambridge colleges, Trinity and King's, agreed to take in twenty-five Hungarian student refugees. Wielding the authority of his office as Registrary, Rattenbury took charge of the exercise, giving the Anglo-Hungarian don Robert Bolgar of King's the task of escorting the new recruits from London and helping them to settle in.

Rattenbury was a contributor to The Oxford Classical Dictionary, under the initials RMR.

Rattenbury continued to serve as Registrary until 1969 but did not reach retirement as a fellow, dying suddenly in July 1970 at Grantchester, where he lived. He left an estate valued at £29,091.

In 1934, he married Monica Mary Miller Jones, and they had three daughters. His widow continued to live in Cambridge and died there in 1998, aged 97.

== Selected publications ==
- Heliodoros, Aithiopika, ed. Robert Mantle Rattenbury, Thomas Wallace Lumb (Paris: Les Belles Lettres, three volumes, 1935–1938)
- "Chastity and Chastity Ordeals in the Ancient Greek Romances", Proceedings of the Leeds Philosophical and Literary Society, Literary and Historical Section 1 (1926): 59–71
- "A New Interpretation of the Chione Fragments" in Classical Quarterly 20/3-4 (1926), 181-185
- "Traces of Lost Greek Novels" in J. U. Powell, New chapters in the History of Greek Literature (Oxford, 1933), 211–257
- "Tacitus, Hist. i. 79" in The Classical Review Vol. 57, No. 2 (September 1943), 67-69
- "An Ancient Armoured Force" in The Classical Review 56/3 (1942): 113–116
- The Classical Review, LX (1946), ed. C. J. Fordyce, R. M. Rattenbury
- The Classical Review, X (1960), Vol. LXXIV of the Continuous Series, ed. C. J. Fordyce, R. M. Rattenbury
