= Leucippe and Clitophon =

Ancient Greek romance

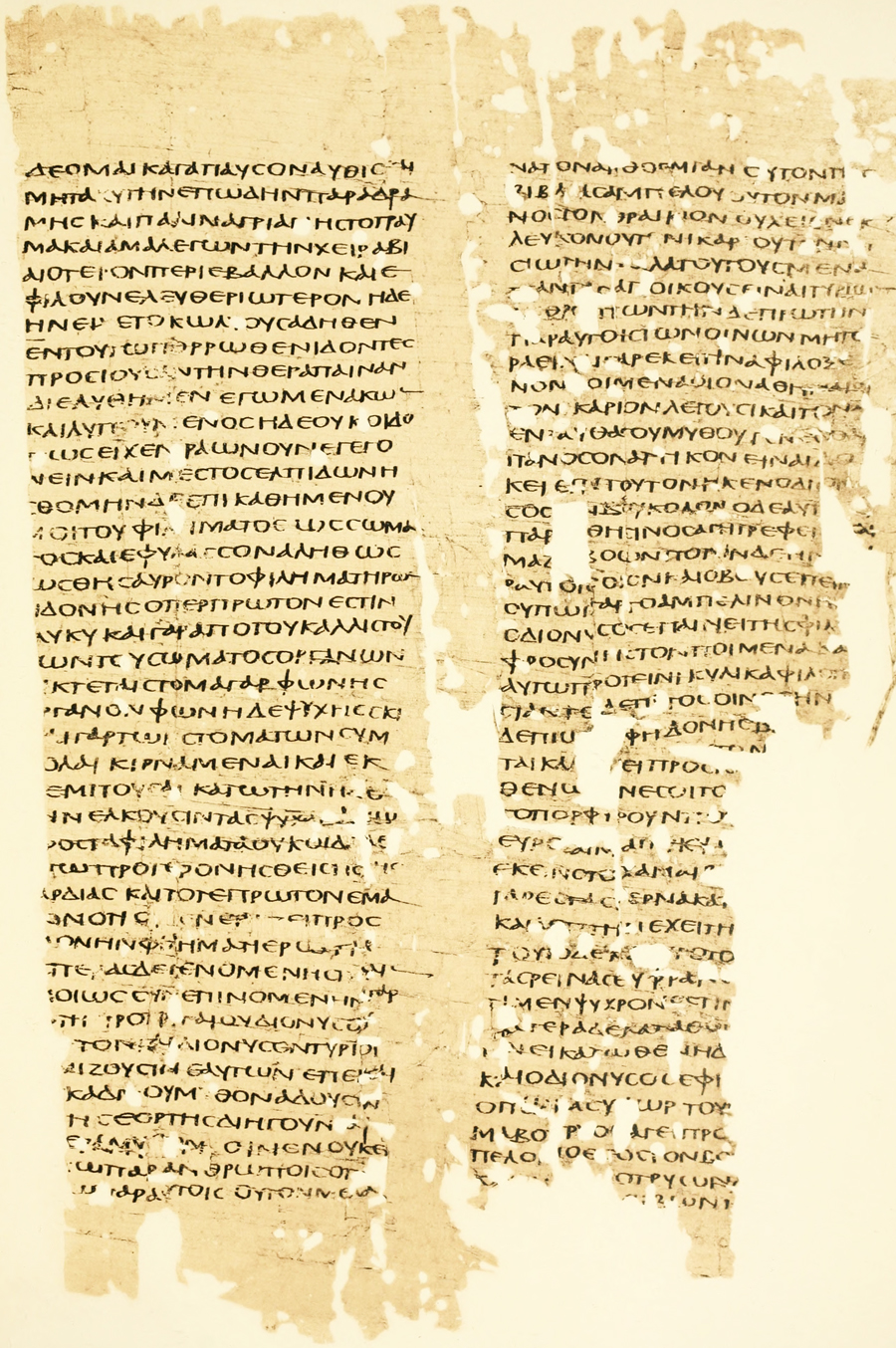
- A papyrus fragment of an ancient copy of Leucippe and Clitophon (P.Oxy. X 1250, 3rd century CE)
- Author: Achilles Tatius
- Language: Ancient Greek
- Genre: Ancient Greek novel
- Publication date: 1914
- Publication place: Roman Empire

The Adventures of Leucippe and Clitophon (Ancient Greek: τὰ κατὰ Λευκίππην καὶ Kλειτoφῶντα), written by Achilles Tatius in eight books, is the second-longest of the five surviving Ancient Greek romances, and the only one to exhibit genuine humour. The novel has been variably described as a "comedy, parody, an antiplatonic essay on eros, and so on."

== Plot summary ==
=== Sidon and Tyre ===
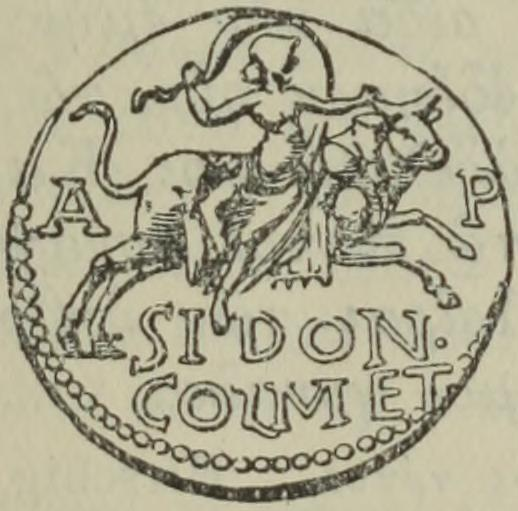
The subject of the rape of Europa (from the Ecphrasis in Book I, 1, 3–13) was closely connected with Sidon, and is represented on Sidonian coins.

I. Landing in Sidon after a storm, an unnamed narrator visits the local temple, to make an offering of thanks to Astarte, the Phoenician goddess of love. He sees there a painting depicting the rape of Europa by Zeus disguised as a bull. The pair are led by Eros (Cupid) and the narrator exclaims how that little boy dominates land, sea and sky. He is unexpectedly answered by a handsome young man, Clitophon, who explains that he is a case in point: he has suffered many blows at the hands of Love. Intrigued, the narrator begs him for his tale. Clitophon agrees reluctantly, and leads his new friend to a grove of plane trees, where he begins his story.

Clitophon explains that he is from Tyre, and is the son of Hippias, whose half-brother Sostratus lives in Byzantium. Shortly after his 18th birthday his father decides that Clitophon should marry his half-sister, Calligone. Alarmed by this prospect, Clitophon has a nightmare in which he imagines himself joined to Calligone from the waist down, but they are cut apart by Medusa brandishing a sickle. Although alarmed by this portent, he believes it signifies that Fate has destined another to be his mate.

Hippias receives word from Sostratus that war has broken out between Thrace and Byzantium. He sends his wife Panthea and his daughter Leucippe to Hippias for safe-keeping. When Clitophon sees Leucippe disembarking on the beach, he is immediately smitten by her stunning beauty. His father arranges a meal for his new guests and seats Clitophon next to Leucippe. This excites the young man further, and he spends the entire meal gazing at her in a daze. Not knowing what to do, he confides his love to his older cousin Clinias. Clinias offers him only a few tips, explaining that Love is really a self-instructed expert, and he should trust his instincts. As they are talking, Clinias' lover Charicles bursts in, complaining that he is being married off to an ugly girl. Clinias consoles him, and Charicles goes off riding on a horse Clinias had given him to take his mind off the marriage. Later, in the midst of their continued discussion, a servant announces that Charicles has been killed in a tragic riding accident. Clitophon consoles his friend, and after attending Charicles' funeral he returns to the house determined to make an amorous approach to Leucippe.

He finds her taking a stroll with her mother in the garden, which is in full bloom, with the birds and crickets contending in making music. When Leucippe and Panthea stop to examine a peacock trying to attract his mate, Clitophon launches into a philosophical discussion with a slave of his household, Satyrus, about how love is a fundamental force of nature. He explains that love can occur not only between people, but also between birds, snakes, trees, rivers, and even rocks. The examples get ever more absurd, and Leucippe is charmed by the explanation of two magnetic rocks that are drawn together by 'love'. She then retires to the house with her mother for her lyre recital.

II. During the recital a bee flies in and stings Clio, Leucippe's maid. Leucippe sings a charm taught to her by an Egyptian woman over the place where the bee had stung, and Clio declares that she feels much better. This gives Clitophon an idea. For the next ten days they glance at each other over dinner, but under the watchful eyes of their parents they can make no further move. Clitophon approaches Satyrus, who explains that Clio has fallen in love with him, and will help contrive a private meeting for him with the maiden. However, when he finally finds himself alone with her in the garden he is at a loss for words, until a bee buzzes around his face. He swats it away and then pretends to be stung on the face, on the lips. Leucippe soothes him with her Egyptian charm, singing it over his lips, which he turns into a kiss. After initially resisting, she kisses him back, but they are disturbed by an approaching servant.

Satyrus helps develop the relationship further. He exchanges their cups at dinner, allowing them to 'kiss' under the noses of their parents by touching with their lips the place on the cup where the other had drunk. He also arranges another meeting in the garden.

Meanwhile, troubled by dreams, his father hurries on Clitophon's marriage to Calligone. Her dress is purple and decorated with gold, her jewelry also expensive. However, the preliminary sacrifice to Aphrodite in the garden does not go well. The offering is stolen by an eagle, who flies off towards the beach. The soothsayers advise Hippias to sacrifice again to Zeus on the beach at midnight to avert the bad omen.

Leucippe had once been pursued unsuccessfully by a certain Callisthenes, a rich but profligate young man of Byzantium. According to the laws of that city, if a man raped a virgin he could be forced to marry her as punishment. So he got himself appointed as holy ambassador for a pilgrimage to Tyre. When Leucippe's mother goes to the ceremony with Calligone, he assumes the young woman is Leucippe, and points her out to his servant Zeno. When Hippias performs his midnight sacrifice on the beach, Zeno goes ashore with eight men disguised as women, who grab the torches of Hippias' party and extinguish them, and in the dark carry off Calligone to Callisthenes' ship. They set sail for Byzantium, thinking they have kidnapped Leucippe.

With his marriage to Calligone now impossible, Clitophon begs Leucippe to perform the 'mysteries of Aphrodite' with him. She agrees, but only if they can meet in her bedroom at night. However, Panthea sleeps across the corridor, and access to that part of the house is barred by a locked door, and guarded by the eunuch Conops. Satyrus obtains a copy of the key and befriends Conops, discussing with him fables about gnats (the meaning of Conops' name), and then offers him a meal with a spiked drink that puts him to sleep. Satyrus at once informs Clitophon, who unlocks the door and enters Leucippe's bedroom with the assistance of Clio. Unfortunately, Panthea wakes up, having had a nightmare about a robber slitting open her daughter's belly with a sword. In a panic she enters Leucippe's bedroom and discovers that she is not alone, but Clitophon escapes in the dark without being recognised.

Panthea assumes that Leucippe's virginity has been stolen, and takes out her rage on Clio. She accuses Leucippe of complicity, but she denies it, suggesting it was a slave, demigod or burglar, and reassures her mother that her virginity is still intact. She did not cry out because she was paralysed by fear. Suspecting that Clio will be forced to reveal the plot in the morning, Satyrus and Clitophon take her by night to Clinias' house. He advises Clitophon to elope to Alexandria, if he can persuade Leucippe. Satyrus and Clinias agree to accompany them, and Clio is sent away to safety at Clinias' suggestion.

In the morning Panthea seeks out Clio, but she has disappeared. Again she accuses Leucippe of knowing her attacker. Leucippe is distraught by her mother's accusations, and when Satyrus tells her of the plan to elope to Alexandria she agrees, threatening to kill herself otherwise. A few days later Clinias arranges for a carriage to come to the house at dusk. They all get on and press on through the night, reaching Sidon by midnight and the port of Berytus (Beirut) at dawn. They catch a ship bound for Alexandria.

On board they meet Menelaus, an Egyptian who has just completed three years' exile in Phoenicia for accidentally killing his male lover in a boar hunt. Clinias sympathises with him, having lost Charicles in similar circumstances. Clitophon suspects that Clinias, with Menelaus' support, will now embark on his usual tirade against women, and questions why homosexuality has become so fashionable. A philosophical argument ensues between Clitophon and Menelaus, arguing the case for heterosexual versus homosexual love. Clitophon says that the beauty of women is longer-lasting, but Menelaus counters that the charm of love lies precisely in its fleeting nature. Clitophon says that women's bodies are built for intercourse with men. Their kisses are more skillful and their orgasms more powerful. Menelaus counters that women are all makeup, hair dye and perfume. He prefers the sweet smell of a boy's sweat, and their kisses, which taste like nectar.

III. After three days at sea in gentle winds they are suddenly struck by a storm. Struggling to keep the ship afloat, they shift their baggage from one side to the other and begin throwing the cargo and even their baggage overboard. Eventually the captain gives the order to abandon ship. The crew climb into the lifeboat being towed behind, and suddenly cut the hawser, leaving the passengers to their fate. The ship hits a rock and breaks up. Clitophon and Leucippe cling to a fragment of the prow. They watch as Menelaus, Clinias and Satyrus drift away on separate pieces of wreckage. Clitophon prays to Poseidon, the storm abates, and they are washed up on the coast of Egypt near Pelusium in the eastern delta.

=== Pelusium and Nicochis ===
They enter the temple of Zeus where they admire two paintings: one of Andromeda being attacked by Cetus, and rescued by Perseus, the other of Prometheus whose liver is being torn out by an eagle, with Hercules aiming his bow at the bird, painted by an otherwise unknown artist Euanthes. The paintings are a hint about Leucippe's fate. After waiting two days for their friends, who do not appear, they hire a boat for Alexandria which goes via the Nile. However, they have not gone far when they are attacked by bandits, who steal their money and shut them in a hut. Clitophon bewails the misery of their wedding, which he imagines he is now having with Leucippe: instead of necklaces she has ropes, the guard is her bridesman, their bridal chamber is a prison, etc., but Leucippe, mortified by her situation, says nothing.

At dawn a savage man arrives on horseback and takes Leucippe away, to be sacrificed as a virgin on behalf of the army. Clitophon is distraught, but the bandits force their remaining captives to move on. On the way, they are attacked by a small force of soldiers, who make light work of the bandits and free Clitophon. Their commander is Charmides, who enlists him in the army as a cavalryman and gives him an Egyptian servant.

On receiving some reinforcements, Charmides advances towards the bandit capital Nicochis, but his way is blocked by a ditch, on the other side of which thousands of bandits have built an altar to which they lead Leucippe. After preparing her for sacrifice, their priest slits open her belly and roasts her innards over the fire, then distributes them for eating. Clitophon is rooted to the spot by the horror of the spectacle, but she cannot be saved. The remains of Leucippe's body are then placed in a coffin. By evening the soldiers are able to build a causeway and cross the ditch. Clitophon tries to kill himself over Leucippe's coffin, when he spies Menelaus and Satyrus running towards him. Menelaus knocks on Leucippe's coffin and she emerges unscathed. Clitophon is astonished, and Menelaus explains that after the shipwreck he and Satyrus were captured by the bandits but freed because some of them recognised him. Satyrus pleaded with Menelaus to save her, and he staged a conjuror's trick using a knife with a retracting blade and a fake belly made of a sheep's skin and sheep innards. Clitophon thanks Menelaus and adopts him as his firm friend.

Charmides decides not to attack before more reinforcements arrive, which have been delayed by the arrival of the Phoenix, a sacred bird from Ethiopia.

IV. Charmides moves the army to a nearby village, where Clitophon is allocated a house. Here Clitophon attempts to have sex with Leucippe, but she rebuffs him, claiming that Artemis told her in a dream that she must remain a virgin until they are formally married. He admits that he had a similar dream, in which he was refused entry to the temple of Aphrodite by the goddess, but with a promise that he will later be made her priest.

While they are enjoying the spectacle of the hippopotamus, Charmides casts his eye on Leucippe. He asks Menelaus privately to bring Leucippe to his bedroom for a fee of 50 gold pieces. Menelaus refuses, and instead reports the story to Clitophon and Leucippe. They decide to tell the general that she will give him what he desires once they reach Alexandria, but right now she has her period. Charmides agrees, but asks to converse with her in the meantime, and even to kiss her, which infuriates Clitophon.

While they are negotiating this, Leucippe falls ill with an unexplained madness. When Menelaus and Clitophon ask her what is the matter she kicks them and struggles against them. When Charmides sees her, he suspects the illness is feigned and orders her tied up. Menelaus asks Charmides for the army doctor, who prescribes purging and sedation.

A message then arrives from the prefect of Egypt, urging Charmides to attack with the troops he currently has. They cross the causeway, and the bandits gather all their old men and send them out with branches of palm to make them look like suppliants. They offer the general a huge bribe to call off his attack. Charmides refuses, so the old men accept their fate and only ask to be killed in their village. Meanwhile, the bandits have been flooding the area around the causeway. When the old men retreat, they part ranks and let through their main force, which was hidden behind them. Isolated on the causeway and surrounded by water, the army is defeated, and Charmides is killed.

Back at the village Leucippe is still sick. A soldier called Chaereas offers to cure her. He explains that Gorgias, an Egyptian soldier (now dead), also fell in love with Leucippe and tricked her into drinking an aphrodisiac. Chaereas fetches an Egyptian doctor, who offers her a potion to cure her for four pieces of gold. Eventually Clitophon agrees and they administer the drug. Leucippe sleeps through the night and by morning is cured. In the meantime a large army is sent from Alexandria, which razes Nicochis to the ground. They resume their journey to Alexandria on the Nile, observing the crocodiles en route, and Chaereas accompanies them.

=== Alexandria ===
V. They arrive at Alexandria via the 'Sun Gate' and travel through the city from south to north, amazed by its beauty, its size and the number of its inhabitants. In the evening they watch the torch festival of Serapis and visit the temple of Zeus. Later they retire to the lodgings Menelaus has hired for them.

The next day Chaereas invites them to dinner in his house on Pharos for his birthday. However, as they are leaving, a hawk chasing a swallow strikes Leucippe's head with its wing. They also notice nearby in a studio a painting depicting the story of Procne, Tereus and Philomela, in which Procne serves the body of her son Itys to Tereus for dinner as punishment for the rape of her sister Philomela. Menelaus says that because of these bad portents, they should postpone their journey to Pharos.

The next day Chaereas returns in the morning and they cannot put off the visit to Pharos any longer. They travel there by boat, leaving Menelaus behind, and visit the lighthouse. Then they retire to Chaereas' house for dinner. However, it is a trap, as Chaereas harbours a secret passion for Leucippe. During the meal Chaereas leaves to go to the toilet and while he is absent armed pirates burst in to grab Leucippe. Clitophon is wounded in the thigh defending her, and cannot stop them from carrying her off in their ship. Hearing the commotion, the commander of the naval forces on Pharos offers to pursue the pirates in his warship. Gradually they close the distance, but when they get near, the pirate captain takes Leucippe bound onto the deck and yells out: 'Is this the prize you seek?' He then cuts off her head and throws the rest of her body overboard. Two sailors retrieve it and they resume the pursuit, but another pirate vessel appears and the naval commander is forced to retreat to Alexandria.

When they reach the docks, Clitophon laments the fact that although he has the larger part of Leucippe's body, the sea has the more important, smaller part. So, not knowing what else to do, he kisses the wound of her neck, and later buries her body. Over the next six months Clitophon recovers from his physical wound, but continues to mourn for the emotional loss of Leucippe.

One day he unexpectedly bumps into Clinias and they embrace one another. Clinias explains that after the shipwreck he was saved by some Sidonian merchants and returned to Tyre. There he discovered that Hippias had recently received a letter from Sostratus betrothing Leucippe to Clitophon. Hippias learned that Clitophon was in Alexandria, and Clinias agreed to go there and fetch the two lovebirds home. When Clitophon tells him what has happened to Leucippe, Clinias is aghast and suggests that he return immediately to Tyre. However, Satyrus tells Clinias that there is a rich young widow of Ephesus, Melite, who has been importuning Clitophon for four months to accompany her home. Clinias also urges the union, and reluctantly Clitophon agrees, on condition that he will not be her husband in deed until he reaches Ephesus. She invites him to a sumptuous meal and although they kiss each other pleasurably he refuses to spend the night with her, citing their earlier agreement.

Clitophon boards a boat headed for Ephesus with Melite, Satyrus and Clinias, while Menelaus stays in Alexandria. Melite has hired a cabin on deck and when they are sleeping there she implores him to have sex with her now, before they arrive in Ephesus. Clitophon maintains that they are travelling over Leucippe's grave and he cannot bear to have sex on a marriage bed rocked by the waves. Melite points out that Aphrodite herself was born from the sea foam, and around them are many positive portents, such as the 'yoke' where the yard and the mast join, like the yoke of marriage, and the curved sail like the belly of a pregnant woman. Clitophon reminds her of their agreement in Alexandria and holds her off for now.

=== Ephesus ===
After five days sailing they reach Ephesus. Her house is large and one of the most prominent in the city. Melite orders an elaborate feast for the evening, and in the meantime they set out to visit her country estate. While walking through the gardens, Melite is importuned by a wretched young woman, Lacaena from Thessaly, who was once free and is now a slave. She is wearing rags and her hair has been shorn off. She begs Melite to free her and tells her that her family will pay her ransom. She accuses Sosthenes, Melite's overseer, of whipping her and trying to rape her. Melite summons Sosthenes, who is unable to explain himself beyond saying that he had bought her for 2000 drachmas from a slave dealer who got her from some pirates. Melite dismisses him and sends Lacaena to the house to recover. Clitophon is curious about this 'Lacaena', remarking that she has some resemblance to Leucippe.

Back at the house, Clitophon is tended by slaves and prepared for his dinner with Melite. During the meal Satyrus asks Clitophon to come aside for a moment. He shows him a letter written by Leucippe, accusing him of causing her much pain and asking him to ransom her, and to send her back to Byzantium. Confused as to how Leucippe can have survived, he writes her a reply swearing that he is still a virgin and begs her not to judge him in spite of his current situation.

On his return to the meal he excuses himself on the grounds that he is not feeling well. Melite follows him to bed and demands sexual gratification. He says he cannot do this right now, but promises to fulfil her wishes soon.

Melite enlists Leucippe, who she imagines is a Thessalian witch, to make a love-potion. Leucippe asks who it is for. Melite explains it is for her husband to be, who refuses to have sexual relations with her. Leucippe is delighted at the news and agrees to make the potion, knowing that it will be ineffective, since she knows nothing about it. She sets off to the cottage on the estate to gather herbs for the potion, accompanied by some maids.

That evening, while dining with Melite, they are both disturbed by Melite's husband Thersander, who, it seems, is not dead after all. He has heard all about Clitophon, and grabbing him by the hair, rains down blows upon him. Suspecting that there may be some reason for this attack, Clitophon does not defend himself. Once Thersander tires of hitting him, Clitophon dusts himself down and asks 'Who are you Sir, and why have you attacked me?' Thersander is enraged by this impudence, and locks Clitophon in a storeroom.

After Thersander leaves in a huff, Melite notices Leucippe's letter, which Clitophon had dropped in his struggle with Thersander. She reads it and suddenly realises who Lacaena is. In tears, she visits Clitophon in the storeroom, accusing him of being a 'wet blanket', of offering her only the pleasure of seeing him, of teasing her more cruelly than a pirate. She begs him for a one-time cure for her ailing heart. Taking pity on her, Clitophon has sex with her in the storeroom.

VI. Melite tells Clitophon where Leucippe is. She swaps clothes with him and gives him 100 pieces of gold. He sneaks out of the house, heading for the cottage on the estate, but soon runs into Thersander and Sosthenes. After publicly abusing him, they haul him off to prison, charging him with adultery. Later he is visited by Clinias and Satyrus, who tell him that Leucippe has gone missing.

Sosthenes tells Thersander that he has been saving a beautiful girl for him, and is told to take her to a private location. Sosthenes goes to the estate where he distracts the serving maids and seizes Leucippe. He then takes her to a hut in a secluded location, telling her that she is soon to become the mistress of her master. When Thersander arrives he is immediately smitten by Leucippe's beautiful eyes. He tries to flatter her, but she just cries. He decides to return when she is in a better mood and asks Sosthenes to speak well of him in his absence.

On returning to the house Thersander accuses Melite of adultery and of freeing Clitophon. Melite denies the adultery, only saying that she was helping a shipwrecked trader who had lost his wife at sea.

Meanwhile, in the secluded hut Sosthenes tells 'Lacaena' what a lucky girl she is. Thersander is handsome, young, rich, of noble birth and very kind. Leucippe replies that his attempt to seduce her amounts to violation of a virgin in the sacred city of Artemis, and is also adultery. When Thersander returns, Sosthenes tells him that he has nearly won 'Lacaena' over. She is only worried about rejection should she once grant him what he desires. Outside the hut they hear Leucippe talking to herself, uttering her true name and declaring that Clitophon is her husband. Thersander vows to take Clitophon's place and gain the love of both Melite and Leucippe. He goes inside and tries to win her over, but she resists his attempts to kiss her. Thersander becomes angry, accusing her of being a harlot, because she was brought here on a pirate ship. Leucippe denies it and swears that she is still a virgin. She dares them to bring out their wheels of torture, whips and fire. She will never surrender her free spirit.

VII. Thersander returns to the gaol and asks the gaoler to let him put a fake inmate in Clitophon's cell, which he agrees to. This new inmate explains to Clitophon that he is accused of being accessory to the murder of a slave girl. He was on his way to Smyrna when he was befriended by a man who took him to an inn. Four ruffians grabbed both of them and started beating them up. Eventually his companion confessed to the murder of Lacaena, having been paid 100 gold pieces by Melite. The ruffians took the money but also accused his innocent companion of being an accessory. Clitophon asks about what happened to the girl's body but the new inmate says he was not involved in her murder, and so does not know.

When Clinias visits the prison again, Clitophon tells him the story of the new inmate and also that he has resolved to revenge Leucippe's apparent death by confessing to the murder himself, citing Melite as his accomplice. Clinias tries to dissuade him to no avail.

At the trial the next day Thersander presents the case for adultery against Clitophon and Melite, but Melite's lawyers defend her well. Then Clitophon gets up and says that he and Melite plotted to kill Leucippe so they could be together and enjoy Melite's wealth. Clinias defends him, explaining that Clitophon merely wishes to die, and so far there is no firm evidence of Leucippe's death. Also, the testimonies of Sosthenes and the serving maids who were with Leucippe when she disappeared have not yet been taken. The court agrees and sends out messengers to summon both Sosthenes and the serving maids. Thersander counters by saying that no new witnesses are needed. He demands the immediate execution of Clitophon for a capital crime freely admitted, and with this opinion the court ultimately concurs.

Clitophon is brought outside into the agora, and stripped so he can be scourged. A wheel and a fire are prepared for the next gruesome stage in his torture and death. Clinias prays to the gods for help, and all seems lost when the high priest of Artemis approaches, leading a sacred embassy from Byzantium. At its head is Sostratus, the father of Leucippe. Since all sentences must be suspended until the sacred embassy has completed its sacrifice, Clitophon is temporarily released. This embassy was sent because Byzantium won its war with Thrace, as the Byzantines believe, with the help of Artemis. Also Sostratus was told in a dream by Artemis that he would find his lost daughter in Ephesus.

Recognising Clitophon, Sostratus asks of what crime he was accused. The bystanders say that he was condemned for killing Leucippe, and in anger Sostratus rushes at Clitophon, and tries to gouge out his eyes. However, Clinias stops him, arguing that if Artemis had said he would find his daughter here then she cannot be dead.

Meanwhile, back at the secluded hut a messenger from Thersander arrives to warn Sosthenes of the bailiffs coming to bring him to court. In fear, he jumps on his horse and makes for Smyrna, but forgets to lock the door. Leucippe escapes and runs to the temple of Artemis, where she throws her arms around the feet of the goddess. For free women to enter there the penalty is death, unless she is a virgin or a slave with a grievance against her master. And if the charge is proven she becomes a servant of the goddess, but otherwise returns to her master.

Back at the agora, a messenger arrives for the high-priest, telling him that a beautiful foreign girl is claiming sanctuary at the temple. Sostratus and Clitophon are overjoyed, believing her to be Leucippe. The high priest gives surety to the magistrate to return Clitophon when summoned, and they all travel to the temple. When they arrive, Leucippe leaves the shrine and embraces her father.

VIII. They re-enter the shrine, but Thersander arrives and accosts the high priest for releasing Clitophon from his bonds. He also demands the return of his slave girl Leucippe, calling her a harlot. Clitophon is enraged and picks a fight with Thersander, but has much the worst of it, and blood is spilt inside the sanctum. Unable to win his fight, Clitophon appeals to the high priest, who declares that Thersander's actions are sacrilegious. The crowd drag away Thersander, who yells out that Clitophon is already condemned to death and Leucippe's claim of virginity will be proven false in the grotto of the 'Pan pipes'.

The high priest invites Clitophon and Leucippe to dinner. Clitophon tells him all of his adventures, except for the bit where he had sex with Melite. He also defends Leucippe's actions to her father. The high priest explains Thersander's reference to the Pan pipes. Syrinx was a maiden thought to be equal to the gods in beauty. Pan pursued her into a thick wood, but she transformed herself into a bunch of reeds that blocked his path. Pan cut them down to find his beloved and only then realised that he had in fact killed her. Gathering the reeds up he cried over them and as he breathed on their ends they made a sweet sound. In memory of her Pan shut his new instrument in a cave. Later he gifted the spot to Artemis, on condition that only a pure maid could enter the grotto. If she is a real virgin a beautiful note will be played on the Pan pipes, and if not a groan is heard and after three days the priestess enters and finds the girl gone.

The following day Sostratus and the high priest perform the sacrifices of the sacred embassy, and Thersander then demands the return of Clitophon to the court. There he accuses Leucippe of being a whore who polluted the temple of Artemis, Sostratus of being her pimp, and Clitophon of being an adulterer and murderer. It does not matter if his victim is still alive, he says, the court order condemned him to death and it cannot be rescinded. He also attacks the high priest, accusing him of having sex with Leucippe, and of turning the temple into a brothel. He likewise charges Melite with adultery and demands the confiscation of her dowry.

The high priest attacks Thersander for his immorality, and asks how Clitophon can be guilty of murdering Leucippe when she is obviously still alive.

Sopater, Thersander's chief counsel, then repeats Thersander's accusations against the priest and claims that the only mistake Thersander ever made in his life was misjudging the character of his wife, who has clearly committed adultery with Clitophon.

Thersander interrupts, issuing two challenges: one to Melite to swear an oath in the sacred water of Styx, that she has not had sexual relations with Clitophon during the period in which he was away. The second challenge is to Leucippe, that if she persists in declaring herself to be a virgin she should submit to the test of the Pan pipes. Leucippe immediately accepts her challenge and likewise Melite, since the requested oath does not cover the period during which Thersander was in Ephesus.

Leucippe enters the grotto of Pan, dressed in sacred robes. Clitophon waits outside worrying that Pan will take advantage of her, but the Pan pipes sound soon after and she emerges triumphantly from the grotto.

Melite's test is to stand in the spring of the Styx with her oath inscribed on a tablet hung about her neck. If the water rises to cover the tablet she is lying, but the water remains low.

Sosthenes is also apprehended and sent to prison awaiting trial for his part in Thersander's subterfuge. Thersander is banished from Ephesus by the court.

The high priest invites Leucippe and Clitophon again to dinner where she explains how she escaped death at the hands of the pirates. They had several prostitutes on board, one of whom resembled Leucippe. Chaereas suggested that they dress her in Leucippe's clothes and then cut off her head, throwing her body overboard without the head, which they disposed of later. This ruse helped them escape and the pirates reckoned on getting a better price for Leucippe than for the prostitute. But when Chaereas insisted on keeping Leucippe as his prize, the pirate captain cut off his head as well.

Sostratus also explains what had happened to Calligone. After abducting her, Callisthenes found out that she was not in fact Leucippe, and apologised for the mistake, promising to respect her virginity. And this experience transformed him from a man of dissolute morality into a virtuous person.

Thersander disappears from Ephesus, and after the statutory delay of three days, fails to renew his claim against Clitophon, and so the court's order for his execution lapses.

They sail to Byzantium, where Clitophon marries Leucippe, and then return to Tyre, where Callisthenes celebrates his marriage to Calligone.

== Date ==
Of the six papyrus copies, the oldest is P. Oxy LVI 3836, originally dated by Parsons to the second century. This date was later firmed up by Cavallo to the first half of the second century, and more recently by Del Corso to the first quarter of the second century. If this dating is accepted for the earliest surviving copy of the romance, then its original composition may plausibly be pushed back to the end of the first century.

All attempts to date the novel based on its vague internal historical references or on stylistic grounds have so far failed to win general acceptance.

However, the connection of the bucoli (literally 'herdsmen', bandits) rebellion of 167/8 CE to 171/2 CE with A.T.'s story deserves separate treatment. First noticed by Altheim, the statement in IV.18.1 that from Alexandria a large military force was dispatched to raze the city of the bucoli to the ground, is also described in Dio Cassius (LXXI.12.4) and in the Historia Augusta (Marc. Aurel. XXI, 2). Dio Cassius relates how the bucoli captured a friend of a centurion, and after swearing an oath over his entrails, devoured them, just as the bucoli did to Leucippe's supposed entrails (II.15.5). A.T. gives the name of the bandit capital as Nicochis (IV.12.8), and this name also appears in Papyrus Thmouis 1, which appears to describe the same bucoli rebellion. Furthermore, A.T. seems to concur with the papyrus in locating Nicochis in the Mendesian nome, near Thmouis, because of his description of the journey by boat from Pelusium to Alexandria. There are only two possible routes: via Memphis or via the Butic canal. A.T. doesn't mention Memphis, the second-largest city in Egypt, and when the bandits waylay them he says the river there is 'very narrow' (III.9.3) and their captain had to back water, rather than turn around or pole out into deeper water. It is clear they are on the Butic canal, which passes through the Mendesian nome, rather than on the much larger Pelusic branch of the Nile. These strong allusions suggest that Achilles Tatius based this part of his novel on recent historical events.

The problem with this otherwise conclusive theory is the much earlier date of the papyri of A.T. (ca. 120 CE). So the destruction of Nicochis (IV.18.1) cannot be based on a historical event. How many times can you raze a city to the ground? The destruction of Nicochis in A.T. is therefore fictitious, a just punishment meted out by the novelist to the evil bandits who nearly killed Leucippe, just as he does to all the other villains in the story: Thersander, who is banished from Ephesus (VIII.15.2), Charmides and Gorgias who are killed in the battle (IV.14.4, IV.15.3), Chaereas who gets his 'just punishment' being beheaded by pirates (VIII.16.4), and Sosthenes who is thrown into jail (VIII.15.2).

== Analysis ==
The first appraisal of this work comes from Photius' Bibliotheca, where we find: "the diction and composition are excellent, the style distinct, and the figures of speech, whenever they are employed, are well adapted to the purpose. The periods as a rule are aphoristic, clear and agreeable, and soothing to the ear". To this Photius added a moralistic bias that would long persecute the author: "the obscenity and impurity of sentiment impair his judgment, are prejudicial to seriousness, and make the story disgusting to read or something to be avoided altogether." Past scholars have passed scathing comments on the work, as in the 1911 Encyclopædia Britannica which brands the novel's style artificial and labored, full of incidents "highly improbable", and whose characters "fail to enlist sympathy". Today's judgements tend to be more favorable, valuing the elements of originality that the author introduces in the genre of the romance.

The most striking of these elements may be the abandonment of the omniscient narrator, dominant in the ancient romance, for a first person narration. To this is added the use of ekphrasis: the novel opens with an admirable description of a painting of the rape of Europa, and also includes descriptions of other paintings such as Andromeda being saved by Perseus and Prometheus being liberated by Heracles. The story, we are told, is inspired by this image, but is not based on it, in contrast to Daphnis and Chloe, a romance which also opens with an ekphrasis, but instead of being inspired by the painting is in fact an interpretation of the painting, making the whole novel a form of ekphrasis.

Achilles Tatius takes pleasure in asides and digressions on mythology and the interpretation of omens, descriptions of exotic beasts (crocodiles, hippopotami) and sights (the Nile delta, Alexandria), and discussions of amorous matters (such as kisses, or whether women or boys make better lovers). His descriptions of confused and contradictory emotional states (fear, hope, shame, jealousy, and desire) are exemplary ("baroque" conceits such as these would be frequently imitated in the Renaissance). There are also several portrayals of almost sadistic cruelty (Leucippe's fake sacrifice and, later, decapitation; Clitophon chained in prison or beaten by Melite's husband) that share much with Hellenistic sculpture (such as the Dying Gaul or the Laocoön and His Sons).

== The romance's modern editions ==
The large number of existing manuscripts attests the novel's popularity. A part of it was first printed in a Latin translation by Annibale Della Croce (Crucejus), in Lyon, 1544; his complete translation appeared in Basel in 1554. The first edition of the Greek original appeared in Heidelberg, 1601, printed together with similar works of Longus and Parthenius; another edition was published by Claudius Salmasius in Leiden, 1640, with commentary. The first important critical edition came out with Friedrich Jacobs in Leipzig, 1821.

There are translations in many languages. The first English translation was William Burton's The Most Delectable and Pleasaunt History of Clitiphon and Leucippe, first published in 1597 and reprinted in 1923, when only 394 copies were printed. it was followed by those of Anthony Hodges (1638), R. Smith (1855), Stephen Gaselee (1917), J. J. Winkler (1989), and Tim Whitmarsh (2001).

A first partial French translation (most likely based on the Latin edition) appeared in 1545 by Philibert de Vienne. The first complete French translation was published in 1568 by François de Belleforest.

In 2005 a Portuguese translation, Os Amores de Leucipe e Clitofonte, was published as part of the Labirintos de Eros book series of translations of ancient Greek novels which was issued by Edições Cosmos of Lisbon. That translation was made by Abel Nascimento Pena, a professor of classics at the University of Lisbon, and included a preface by Marília Pulquério Futre Pinheiro.

== Influence ==
Literary parallels have been found between Leucippe and Clitophon and the Christian Acts of Andrew, which are roughly contemporary compositions.

A copy of Leucippe and Clitophon was held in the extensive library of the Byzantine provincial magnate Eustathios Boilas in the eleventh century.

Leucippe and Clitophon is the key source for The Story of Hysmine and Hysminias, by the 12th century AD Greek author Eustathius Macrembolites (or Eumathius). This book was frequently translated in the Renaissance.

Leucippe and Clitophon is also imitated in Historia de los amores de Clareo y Florisea by the Spanish writer Alonso Nuñez de Reinoso (Venice, 1552). This novel was translated into French as Les Amours de Florisee et Clareo et de la peu fortunee Ysea by Jacques Vincent (Paris, 1554).

A French adaptation of Achilles Tatius' novel (with significant changes) was published as Les adventureuses et fortunees amours de Pandion et d'Yonice (1599) by Jean Herembert, sieur de la Rivière.
