= Ephesian Tale =

Ancient Greek novel by Xenophon of Ephesus

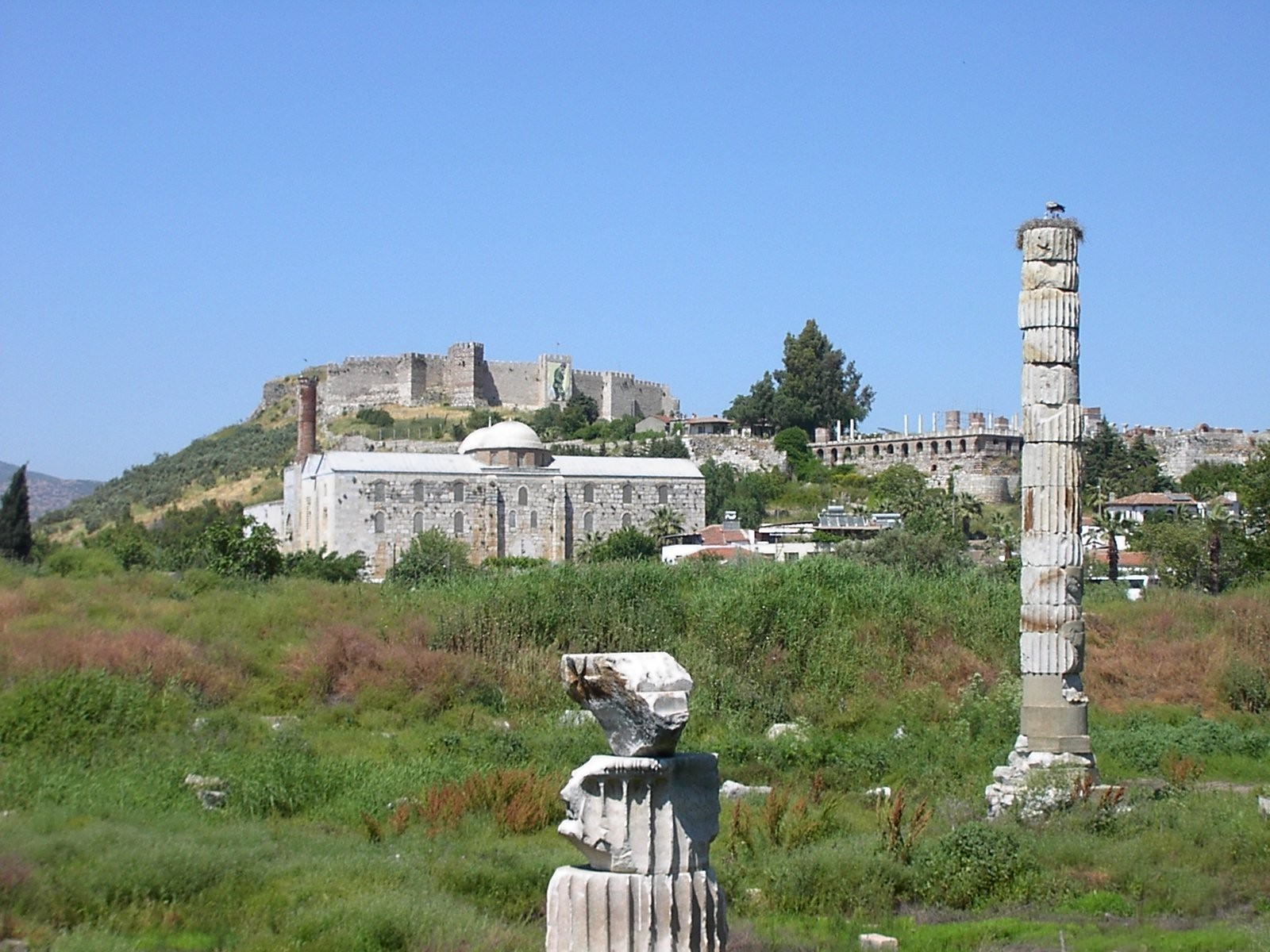
Site of the Temple of Artemis in Ephesus.

The Ephesian Tale of Anthia and Habrocomes (Greek: Ἐφεσιακά, Ephesiaka; also Τὰ κατὰ Ἀνθίαν καὶ Ἁβροκόμην, Ta kata Anthian kai Habrokomēn) by Xenophon of Ephesus is an Ancient Greek novel written before the late 2nd century AD, though in 1996 James O’Sullivan argued the date should actually be seen as closer to 50 AD.

Translator Graham Anderson sees the Ephesiaca as "a specimen of penny dreadful literature in antiquity." Moses Hadas, an earlier translator, takes a slightly different view: "If An Ephesian Tale is an absorbing tale of love and improbable adventure, it is also a tract to prove that Diana of the Ephesians (who was equated with Isis) cares for her loyal devotees."

Because of its shortness and other factors, some scholars maintain that the version we have is merely an epitome of a longer work. The Suda, a 10th-century Medieval Greek historical encyclopedia, describes the novel as having ten books when the version we have is divided into five. But Anderson suggests that "we may well find that our version is one of not two but a multiplicity of retellings of a familiar story, whose relationships to Xenophon are not easily identifiable." Translator Jeffrey Henderson offers another reason for the disparity: "For the number of books, the itacism of έ ("five") ... is a likelier explanation of Suda's ί ("ten") than the supposition that our text is an epitome. The story is very similar to the later story of Apollonius of Tyre.

== Synopsis ==
=== Book I ===
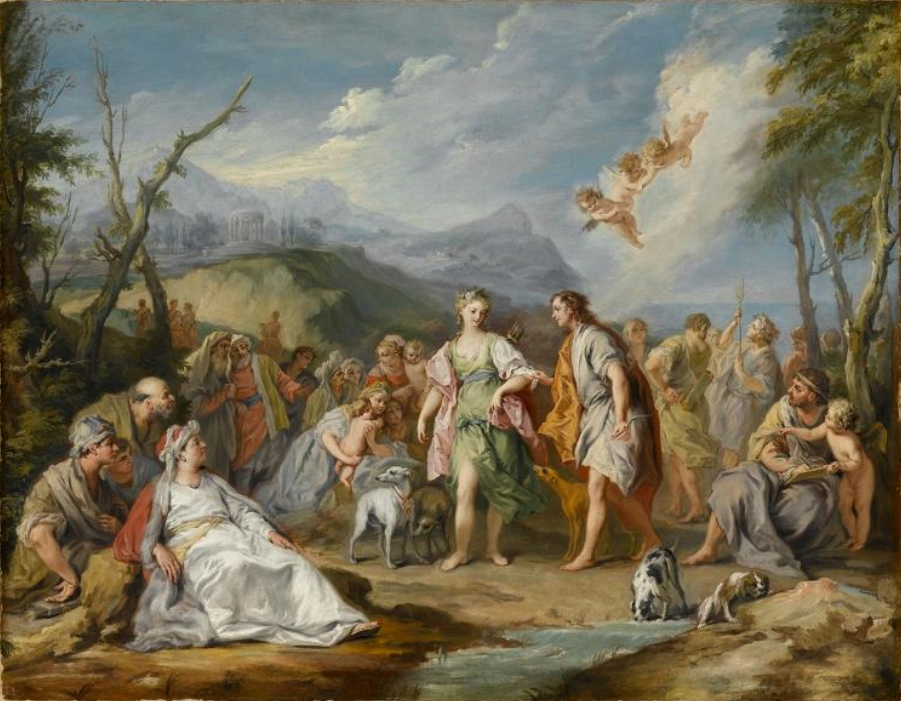
The Meeting of Habrokomes and Antheia (Jacopo Amigoni, 1744)

In the city of Ephesus, Habrocomes, an attractive, cultured, and arrogant young man of 16, and Anthia, an attractive and chaste young woman of 14, fall helplessly in love with each other after briefly meeting at the festival of Artemis. But because each is afraid to reveal this love to the other, they suffer miserably. Their families, in the hopes of curing them, consult the shrine of Apollo at Colophon. The soothsayer predicts that Habrocomes and Anthia will undergo travails involving pirates, tombs, fire, and flood, but their condition will improve. In an effort to avert such evils, the parents arrange that the lovers will quickly be married to each other and then sent to Egypt for their safety.

En route to Egypt, Habrocomes and Anthia pledge that if they ever became separated they would remain faithful. When their ship stops at Rhodes, it attracts the attention of a crew of Phoenician pirates, who plunder it, set it aflame, and take Habrocomes and Anthia captive. The pirates convey them to Tyre. Their captain, Corymbos, falls in love with Habrocomes, and his fellow pirate Euxinos falls in love with Anthia. Corymbos and Euxinos agree to each talk persuasively to the love object of the other, encouraging cooperation. Habrocomes and Anthia both say they need more time to think before deciding.

=== Book II ===
Afterwards, in private, Habrocomes and Anthia decide that their only acceptable recourse is to commit suicide together. However, Apsyrtos, the chief of the pirate stronghold, is struck by the beauty of the young couple and concludes that they would bring an excellent price on the slave market. He takes them, along with their loyal slaves Leucon and Rhode, to his house in Tyre and puts them under the care of a trusted slave, then goes to Syria on other business.

While Apsyrtos is in Syria, his daughter Manto falls in love with Habrocomes and writes him a note expressing her feelings. He spurns her advances. When Apsyrtos returns to Tyre, bringing with him a young man named Moeris as a husband for his daughter, Manto takes revenge on Habrocomes by telling her father that Habrocomes has raped her. Apsyrtos has Habrocomes whipped and tortured. He then marries Manto to Moeris and gives them a wedding present of three slaves: Anthia, Leucon, and Rhode. Moeris, Manto, and the slaves go to live in Antioch. Manto separates Leucon and Rhode from Anthia by having them sold to an old man living far away in Lycia, and completes her revenge by having Anthia married to another slave of hers, a rural goatherd named Lampo.

Meanwhile, Apsyrtos discovers the love note his daughter had written to Habrocomes. He immediately frees Habrocomes and gives him employment as manager of the house.

Lampo honors Anthia's wish to remain faithful to Habrocomes and doesn't attempt to consummate the relationship. But Moeris falls in love with Anthia and seeks Lampo's help in winning her heart. Instead, Lampo tells Manto of her husband's plan; Manto, seeing that Anthia is still her rival in love, becomes enraged and orders Lampo to take Anthia into the forest and kill her. Lampo promises to do so but takes pity on Anthia and, instead, sells her to Cilician merchants.

These merchants set sail for their country but are shipwrecked en route. The survivors, including Anthia, reach shore only to be captured in the forest by a robber named Hippothoos and his band. During this time, Habrocomes learns that Lampo had sold Anthia to the Cilicians, so he secretly goes to Cilicia in search of her.

When the robber band is about to sacrifice Anthia to the god Ares, a body of troops, led by Perilaos, the chief law enforcement official in Cilicia, suddenly appears. All the robbers are killed or captured save Hippothoos, who escapes; and Anthia is rescued. Perilaos takes Anthia and the captured robbers to Tarsus, falling in love with her on the way. Because he is so insistent in offering to marry Anthia, she finally relents, fearing a worse fate if she rejects him. But she makes him promise to wait thirty days before the wedding.

Meanwhile, Habrocomes reaches Cilicia and encounters Hippothoos. The two immediately become firm friends and pledge to travel together.

=== Book III ===
Hippothoos leads Habrocomes away from Cilicia to the city of Mazacos in Cappadocia. There, at an inn, Hippothoos narrates his life story, as follows:

He was born to a distinguished family in Perinthos, near Thrace. When he was still a young man he fell passionately in love with Hyperanthes, and formed a partnership with him. But then a rich teacher, Aristomachos, visiting from Byzantium, also became smitten by Hyperanthes and convinced the boy's father to let his son be taken to Byzantium on the pretext of improving his education. Hippothoos eventually went to Byzantium, sneaked into Aristomachos’ house, murdered the man in his sleep, and ran away with Hyperanthes. They were shipwrecked off Lesbos, and Hyperanthes drowned. So Hippothoos buried his partner's body on the beach, then took up the life of a robber.

Hippothoos then tells Habrocomes of his capture of Anthia in Cilicia and how she was taken in the fight that destroyed his robber band. Habrocomes becomes excited. Appealing to the memory of Hyperanthes, he convinces Hippothoos to return with him to Cilicia to help find Anthia.

When the thirty days are nearly passed and the wedding is near, Anthia falls into despair. Believing that Habrocomes must be dead, and finding marriage to another man intolerable, she conspires with Eudoxos, an Ephesian physician, to give her a poison. In return she will give him enough of Perilaos’ possessions to buy him passage back to Ephesus, and will promise not to use the potion until he has left. Eudoxos agrees to the plan but gives her a hypnotic drug instead of a lethal one, knowing he will be long gone by the time Anthia awakens.

After her wedding, waiting in the bridal chamber, Anthia drinks the potion. Perilaos discovers her body and grieves for her, interring her with great ceremony in a funerary chamber. She awakens some time later, disappointed at the realization that she is alive. So she decides to remain in the tomb and starve herself to death. But a group of robbers have heard of her rich burial and, after waiting for nightfall, break into the vault, take all the silver and gold, and carry her off as prisoner. They set sail for Alexandria, planning to sell her into slavery.

Meanwhile, Habrocomes, with a new band of thieves led by Hippothoos, arrives near Tarsus and hears how Anthia, after being rescued from robbers, had wed her rescuer, killed herself, and been entombed, only to have her body snatched by tomb raiders who escaped to Alexandria. So Habrocomes waits until Hippothoos and his band are drunk and asleep before making his way to a ship bound for Alexandria, hoping to recover Anthia's body.

The robbers sell Anthia to merchants who sell her to Psammis, a prince of India. Anthia plays on the Indian's superstitions by pretending that she is consecrated to Isis until the proper time for her marriage, which is still a year off. Isis will punish any who force her to break her vows. So Psammis agrees to wait a year before bringing her to his bed.

The ship bearing Habrocomes runs aground at Paralion near the mouth of the Nile. A nearby band of thieves called the Shepherds capture the crew, loot the ship, and take everyone across the desert to the Egyptian city of Pelusium. There the crew is sold into slavery. Habrocomes is sold to Araxos, a retired veteran soldier, whose annoying and ugly wife, named Cyno (literally meaning "Bitch"), becomes attracted to Habrocomes. Eventually, Cyno murders Araxos in his sleep so she can marry Habrocomes. This causes Habrocomes to flee in horror. So Cyno announces that it was he who murdered her husband. Habrocomes is quickly arrested and taken to Alexandria to be punished by the governor of Egypt.

=== Book IV ===
Hippothoos, meanwhile, has enlarged his band to five hundred men and traversed Syria, Phoenicia, and Egypt to arrive at Coptos near Ethiopia, where they waylay travelers.

Habrocomes is placed on a cross upon a cliff overlooking the Nile and left to die. He prays for mercy, whereupon a big wind blows the cross into the river. He is carried downstream until he is recaptured and returned to the governor of Egypt. The governor orders Habrocomes to be burned alive. Habrocomes prays for mercy again and is saved, this time by waves from the Nile that douse the flames. The governor views this as a miracle and has Habrocomes imprisoned but well cared for until he can tell his story. Eventually Habrocomes tells his story and is released. The governor helps him sail to Italy to continue his search, and has Cyno crucified in his place.

Meanwhile, Anthia travels with Psammis and all his goods to Ethiopia. At Coptos, Hippothoos' band raids the caravan, kills Psammis and captures Anthia. Since Anthia and Hippothoos don't recognize each other, Anthia remains a prisoner. Another robber, Anchialos, lusts after Anthia and assaults her. In self-defense, she kills him with a sword. For this, Hippothoos casts her into a pit with two mastiffs and leaves her under guard to die. But her guard, Amphinomos, takes pity upon her and keeps both Anthia and the dogs fed.

=== Book V ===
Habrocomes, blown off course, lands in Syracuse, Sicily, and lodges with an elderly fisherman, Aigialeus. Aigialeus tells his own story of how, in his native Sparta, his love for Thelxinoe had caused him to elope with her before her father could have her married to another. The two settled in Sicily to live out their lives. Recently Thelxinoe died but Aigialeus mummified her body in the Egyptian manner and now continues to eat, sleep, and talk with her. The steadfastness of this love is an inspiration to Habrocomes.

Hippothoos, assuming Anthia is dead, sets out to sack and conquer the Egyptian village of Areia. Meanwhile, Amphinomos frees Anthia and takes her to Coptos. When the governor of Egypt learns of Hippothoos' attack on Areia, he sends a large force under the command of Polyidos to destroy his band. The robbers are vanquished but Hippothoos escapes to Sicily. The captured robbers guide Polyidos and his force back to Coptos to root out any remaining members of the band. There he catches Amphinomos and Anthia.

Taking Anthia back to Alexandria, Polyidos falls in love with her. When Polyidos' wife, Rhenaia, learns of this, she has her slave take Anthia far away and sell her to a brothel keeper in Tarentum, Italy. Hippothoos arrives in Taormina, Sicily, and Habrocomes sails to Italy. As for Leucon and Rhode, their master in Xanthos has died, leaving them a considerable portion of his estate. So they sail for home, Ephesus, stopping at Rhodes along the way. There they learn that Habrocomes and Anthia have not returned home and that their parents have died of old age and despair. They decide to remain in Rhodes until they can learn more.

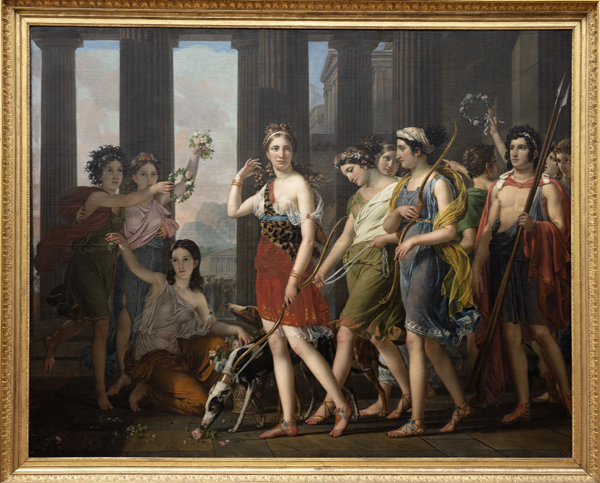
The Fair Anthia Leading her Companions to the Temple of Diana in Ephesus (Joseph Paelinck, c. 1820)

Meanwhile, Anthia, in order to avoid working as a prostitute, feigns a cataleptic fit and later declares that she suffers from the "sacred disease". Habrocomes takes up work as a stonecutter in Nuceria, Italy.

Hippothoos, out of poverty, marries a rich old woman to inherit her fortune when she dies. After that, he acquires the love of a younger man, Clisthenes, and sails with him to Italy to purchase slaves and luxuries. In Tarentum he encounters Anthia, whom he recognizes as the woman he'd thrown in the pit with the dogs. He purchases her from the brothel keeper, then takes her home when he learns her story, including that she is the missing wife of Habrocomes.

When Habrocomes can no longer endure stonecutting, he makes his way home to Ephesus, stopping at Syracuse to mourn the recent death of Aigialeus, then continuing on to Rhodes. There, in the temple of the sun, he chances to meet Leucon and Rhode.

Meanwhile, Hippothoos decides to take Anthia home to Ephesus; he and Clisthenes will also move there. The group stops briefly at Rhodes. During the festival of the sun, Anthia encounters Leucon and Rhode at the temple of Isis. Eventually Habrocomes finds them all. Then everyone, including Hippothoos and Clisthenes, shares their stories. Habrocomes and Anthia confirm to each other that they have been faithful all during their travails. The next day they all set sail together for Ephesus. Habrocomes and Anthia make sacrifices to Artemis, raise tombs for their deceased parents, and pass the remainder of their days in Ephesus with Leucon, Rhode, Hippothoos, and Clisthenes.

== Bibliography ==
- Anderson, G. (1989). "Xenophon of Ephesus: An Ephesian Tale". In Reardon, B. P. (ed.). Collected Ancient Greek Novels. Berkeley – London – Los Angeles: University of California Press. ISBN 0-520-04306-5.
- Hadas, M. (1953). Three Greek Romances. Indianapolis: The Liberal Arts Press, Inc. ISBN 0-672-60442-6.
- Hoag, G. G. (2015). Wealth in Ancient Ephesus and the First Letter to Timothy: Fresh Insights from Ephesiaca by Xenophon of Ephesus. Bulletin for Biblical Research, Suppl. 11. Winona Lake, IN: Eisenbrauns.
- Longus; Xenophon (2009). Henderson, J. (ed.). Daphnis and Chloe. Anthia and Habrocomes. Cambridge, Ma. – London: Harvard University Press. ISBN 0-674-99633-X.
- Perria, L. (2011). Γραφίς. Per una storia della scrittura greca libraria (secoli IV a.C. – XVI d.C.). Νέα Ῥώμη, Quad. 1. Roma – Città del Vaticano: Università di Roma «Tor Vergata» – Biblioteca Apostolica Vaticana. ISBN 978-88-210-0887-0.
