= Achilles Tatius =

2nd-century Greek novelist

- Born: c. 100 AD Alexandria, Roman Egypt
- Died: c. 170 (aged 69–70)
- Occupation: Novelist
- Genre: Romance
- Literary movement: Second Sophistic
- Notable works: Leucippe and Clitophon

Achilles Tatius (Greek: Ἀχιλλεὺς Τάτιος, Achilleus Tatios) of Alexandria was a Roman-era Greek writer of the 2nd century AD whose fame is attached to his only surviving work, the ancient Greek novel, or romance, The Adventures of Leucippe and Clitophon.

== Life and works ==
Eustathius of Thessalonica (in his commentary on Homer's Odyssey 14.350), the Suda, Photius, in his Bibliotheca (cod. 87), and the manuscript tradition all affirm he lived and wrote in Alexandria. The papyrus, and linguistic evidence demonstrate he flourished early in the 2nd century AD. Suda preserves a tradition that "He became at last a Christian and a bishop." There are literary parallels between Leucippe and Clitophon and the Christian Acts of Andrew, a roughly contemporary composition.

The Suda also ascribes to the author a work on the sphere (in Greek περὶ σφαίρας), a fragment of which, professing to be an introduction to the Phaenomena of Aratus, may still be extant (in Greek Eἰσαγωγὴ εἰς τὰ Ἀράτoυ φαινόμενα). This, however, may be the work of another Achilles Tatius, who lived in the 3rd century. This work is referred to by Firmicus Maternus, who about 336 speaks of the prudentissimus Achilles in his Matheseos libri (Math. iv. 10). The fragment was first published in 1567, then in the Uranologion of the Jesuit scholar Denis Pétau, with a Latin translation in 1630. The same source also mentions a work of Achilles Tatius on etymology, and another entitled Miscellaneous Histories.
