= Xenophon of Ephesus =

Greek writer (fl. 2nd-3rd centuries CE)

Xenophon of Ephesus (Greek: Ξενοφῶν ὁ Εφέσιος; fl. 2nd century – 3rd century AD) was a Greek writer. His surviving work is the Ephesian Tale of Anthia and Habrocomes, otherwise known as the Ephesiaka. It is one of the earliest novels as well as one of the sources for Shakespeare's Romeo and Juliet.

Xenophon was a critic of the philosophy of Stoicism, as reflected in the Ephesiaka.

== Ephesian Tale of Anthia and Habrocomes ==
The Ephesian Tale of Anthia and Habrocomes tells the tale of Anthia and Habrocomes, two teenage protagonists living in the city of Ephesus, who fall in love at a festival for Artemis. Unable to confess their love to each other, the two enter a depressive state, until their families, after consulting an oracle who tells them of a troublesome future, arrange for their marriage and for them to be sent to Egypt for their safety. During their journey, the pair are kidnapped by a band of pirates, with members who fall in love with the pair, and are then taken and hidden to be sold into slavery by the chief pirate, Aspyrtos. Habrocomes endures false rape accusations from Aspyrtos' daughter, who had also fallen in love with him, and faces the punishments that follow, and Anthia is gifted as a slave to a newlywed couple, married to slave named Lampo, and sold to a different slave holder in Anatolia. Aspyrtos discovers that his daughter was in love with Habrocomes, and frees him from his servitude, hiring him to manage his house. Meanwhile, Lampo honors Anthia's wishes to remain faithful to Habrocomes, but is then instructed to kill her. Instead, he sells her to seafaring merchants from Cilicia, who shipwreck and are captured by robbers led by Hippothoos, who plans to sacrifice her to Ares. Habrocomes learns that she was sold, and flees to Cilicia to find her. Anthia, along with Hippothoos are ambushed by law enforcement, and are the sole survivors are this conflict, with Anthia being captured by the chief of law enforcement, Perilaos, who falls in love with her, and Hippothoos escaping, only to encounter and befriend Habrocomes. The two leave for Anatolia, where Hippothoos tells Habrocomes his life story, whereupon Habrocomes convinces him to join him in a search for Anthia. Anthia, thinking Habrocomes has died by now, requests a lethal potion to kill herself with. He instead gives her a hypnotic drug, and after the wedding Anthia drinks it. Perilaos mourns what he thinks is her death, only for her to awake after she had been laid to rest. That night, however, a group of bandits rob the tomb, kidnap her, and set sail for Alexandria.

== Criticisms of Stoicism ==
The Ephesian Tale of Anthia and Habrocomes was a satirical writing on the philosophy of Stoicism, particularly the Stoic view on slavery. The two protagonists are believed to be written as Stoics, remaining unfazed when presented with distress. The character Habrocomes, realizing that he has fallen in love with Anthia, chastises himself, calling himself " αἰχμάλωτος", a slave to love. Later, Habrocomes is enslaved, and endures torture. This contrast is written by Xenophon to point out the Stoic belief that slavery to passion is worse than legal slavery.

The pirate who had kidnapped Habrocomes intended to enter a sexual encounter with the titular character. Habrocomes is then left to deal with his Stoic philosophic ideals of accepting fate, and apathy towards outside factors enacting on oneself.
