= Jonathan Cope (dancer) =

British ballet dancer

Jonathan Cope CBE
- Born: 1963 (age 62–63); Devon, England
- Education: The Royal Ballet School
- Occupations: ballet dancer; répétiteur
- Spouse: Maria Almeida
- Children: 2
- Career
- Former groups: The Royal Ballet

Jonathan Cope CBE (born 1963) is a British ballet dancer. He was a principal dancer at The Royal Ballet until his retirement in 2006, then served as a répétiteur with the company until 2019.

== Early life ==
Cope was born in Devon. He started ballet at age six and trained in Wales. He later enrolled in The Royal Ballet School in London.

== Career ==
He joined The Royal Ballet in 1982, at age 19, was promoted to soloist in 1985 was named a principal dancer in 1986. He created the role of The Prince alongside Darcey Bussell in Kenneth MacMillan's The Prince of the Pagodas in 1989. In 1990, at age 27, Cope retired from the Royal Ballet due to physical stress. He went to pursue "a lifestyle more in tune with that of the majority of the population" and a career in property development, but returned to the Royal Ballet in 1992. His repertoire include works by MacMillan and Frederick Ashton, and originated works by choreographers including MacMillan, David Bintley and Christopher Wheeldon. His most notable partnerships are with Bussell and Sylvie Guillem.

Cope was appointed a CBE (Commander of the Order of the British Empire) in the 2003 Queen's New Year's Honours List for his services to Ballet.

In September 2005, Cope, at age 42, announced he would retire from dancing after two performances of The Firebird in February 2006, with Miyako Yoshida as his final partner, and withdrew from all performances prior to The Firebird. He became a répétiteur with the Royal Ballet that year. However, he broke a leg in a car accident in January 2006.

Cope had briefly returned to the stage from retirement several time. In 2007, Cope appeared in Bussell's pre-retirement gala at Sadler's Wells Theatre and danced Wheeldon's Tryst. In Bussell's farewell at the Royal Opera House, Cope presented live coverage alongside Martha Kearney and interviewed Bussell backstage. In 2009, during the Royal Ballet's first tour in Cuba, he stepped in for an injured Rupert Pennefather, who Cope had coached, in A Month In The Country. In 2012, Cope performed at the London Olympics closing ceremony, in a sequence titled 'Spirit of the Flame', choreographed by Wheeldon and composed by David Arnold. Bussell, who also came out from retirement, flew to the stage on a flaming phoenix and when landing was met by Cope, Gary Avis, Edward Watson, Nehemiah Kish and over 200 ballet dancers, after which the Olympic Flame was extinguished.

In 2019, he left his role as a full-time répétiteur. Kevin O'Hare, the artistic director of the company, said he hoped Cope would return and coach from time to time.

== Personal life ==
Cope is married to former Royal Ballet principal dancer Maria Almeida. They have two children.

== Selected repertoire ==
Cope's repertoire with the Royal Ballet includes:

- Albrecht - Giselle
- Solor - La Bayadère
- Jean de Brienne - Raymonda
- Prince Siegfried -Swan Lake
- Prince Florimund -The Sleeping Beauty
- Prince - The Nutcracker
- Prince - Cinderella
- Beliaev - A Month in the Country
- Palemon - Ondine
- Armand - Marguerite and Armand
- Aminta - Sylvia
- Romeo - Romeo and Juliet
- Des Grieux - Manon
- Rudolf - Mayerling
- Rasputin - Anastasia
- Foreman The Judas Tree
- Polyphonia

=== Created roles ===
- Different Drummer
- Le baiser de la fée
- The Prince of the Pagodas
- Frankenstein
- Modern Prometheus
- Sawdust and Tinsel
- A Broken Set of Rules
- Fearful Symmetries
- Galanteries
- "Still Life" at the Penguin Café
- Les Saisons
- Tryst
