= Miyako Yoshida =

Japanese ballet dancer (born 1965)

Miyako Yoshida OBE
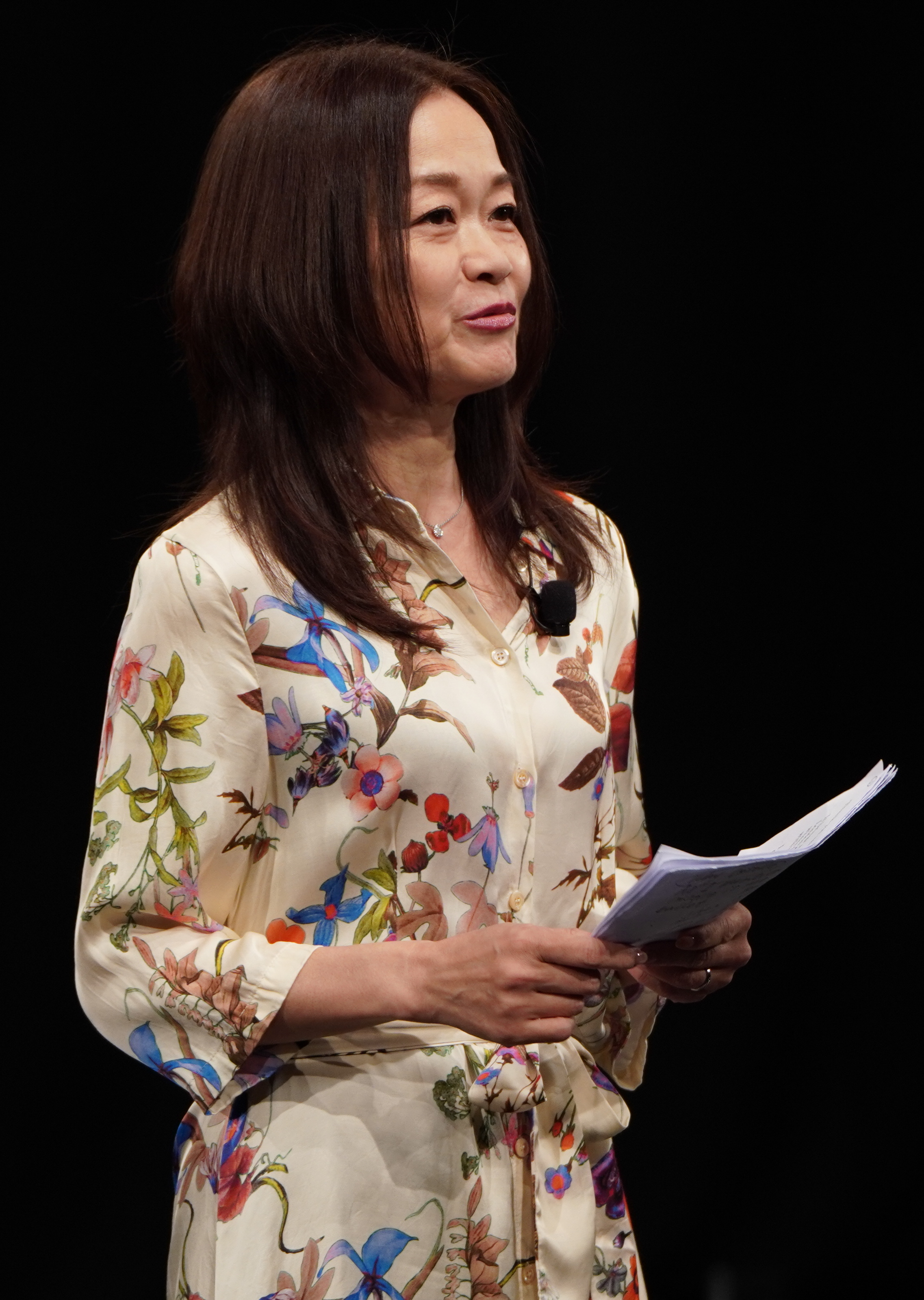
- Miyako Yoshida in 2025
- Born: 28 October 1965 (age 60); Tokyo, Japan
- Occupation: Ballet dancer
- Spouse: Takashi Endo

Miyako Yoshida OBE (吉田都, born 28 October 1965) is a Japanese ballet dancer and director. She was a Principal Guest Artist of The Royal Ballet as well as a principal dancer with K-ballet, Japan. Since 2020 she has been the artistic director of the National Ballet of Japan.

== Life and career ==
Born and trained in Tokyo, Yoshida won the Prix de Lausanne in 1983 and joined the Royal Ballet School in England. In 1984, she joined the then Sadler's Wells Royal Ballet (now the Birmingham Royal Ballet) and was promoted to principal in 1988. The following year, she was awarded the Global Award and the Arts Encouragement Prize for Artists of the Ministry of Education, Science, Sports and Culture, Japan.

In 1995, Yoshida joined The Royal Ballet as principal dancer and was known for her partnership with such as Tetsuya Kumakawa, and Irek Mukhamedov. She was also appointed a UNESCO Artist for Peace in 2001. In 2004, she married Takashi Endo, a Japanese football agent.

In 2006, she joined K-ballet while she continued dancing with The Royal Ballet, before winning the Best Female Dancer at the National Dance Awards. In 2007, she was appointed an Honorary Officer of the Order of the British Empire (OBE) for services to dance. In 2010 she retired from the Royal Ballet at Covent Garden. From 2010 until 2019, she worked as a freelance dancer.

In 2018, during her time as a freelance dancer, Yoshida was appointed as the artistic consultant of The National Ballet of Japan. In 2020, she became the artistic director of Ballet & Dance of the National Ballet of Japan.

Yoshida returned to London in 2025, when the National Ballet of Japan performed Giselle at the Royal Opera House. This was the company's first overseas performance.

== Career and repertory ==
Odette/Odile (Swan Lake), Aurora, Juliet (Romeo and Juliet (Prokofiev)), Lise, Giselle (Giselle), Swanilda (Coppélia), Sugar Plum Fairy (The Nutcracker), Kitri (Don Quixote), Cinderella, Cio-Cio San (Madame Butterfly), Ondine, Chloë, Titania, Tchaikovsky pas de deux, 'Le Corsaire pas de deux, Homage to the Queen and leading roles in Prince of the Pagodas, Symphonic Variations, Elite Syncopations, Snow Queen, Galanteries, Fin du jour, Symphony in C, Birthday Offering, The Firebird, Scènes de ballet, Les Rendezvous and Rhapsody.

At the 2006 National Dance Awards, she received the award of Best Female Dancer.
