= 2012 Summer Olympics closing ceremony =

- Part of 2012 Summer Olympics
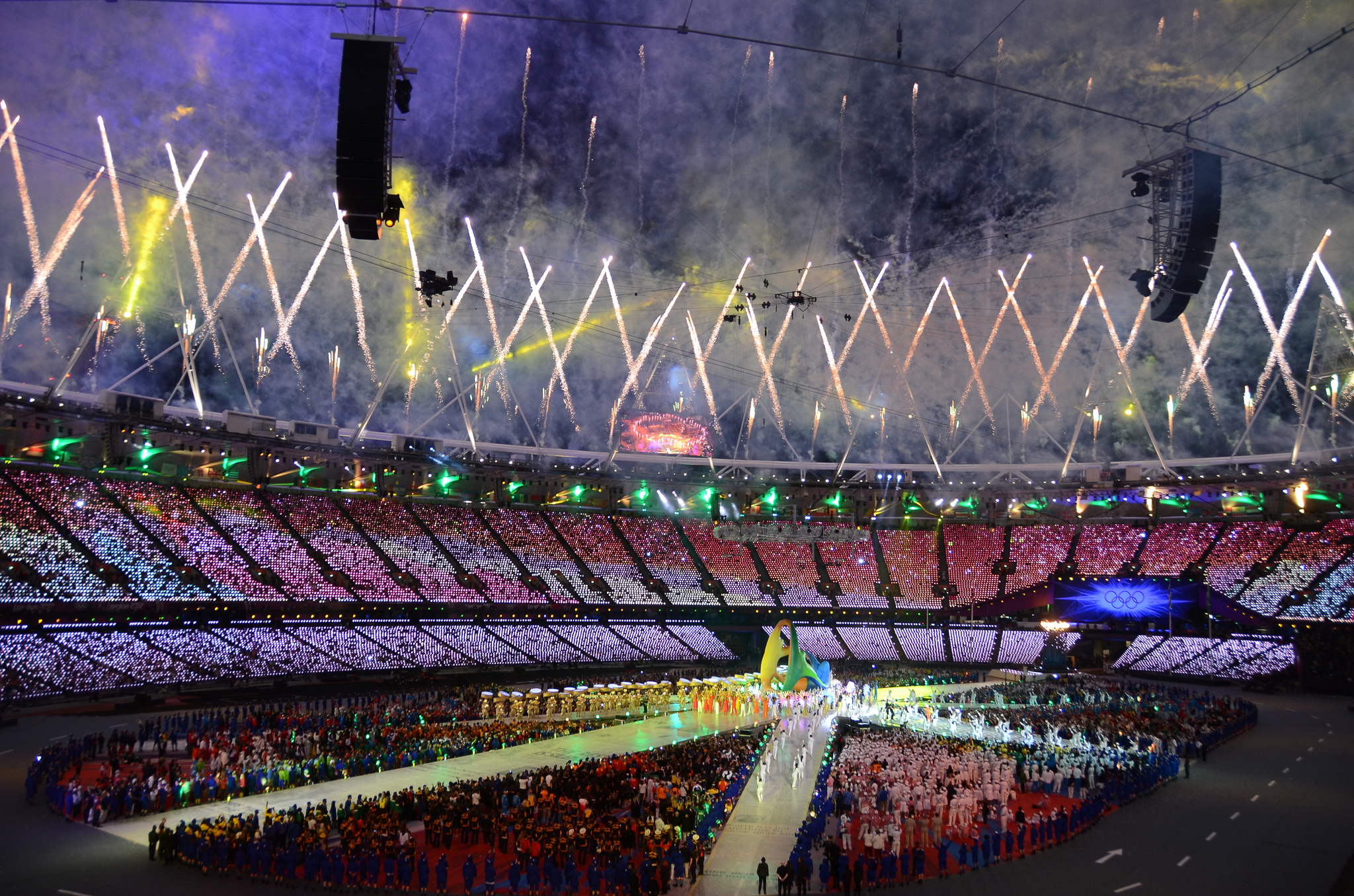
- Date: 12 August 2012; 14 years ago
- Time: 21:00 – 00:11 BST (UTC+1)
- Venue: Olympic Stadium
- Location: London, United Kingdom; 51°32′19″N 0°01′00″W
- Also known as: A Symphony of British Music
- Filmed by: Olympic Broadcasting Services (OBS)
- Footage: The ceremony on the IOC YouTube channel

The closing ceremony of the London 2012 Summer Olympics, also known as A Symphony of British Music, was held on 12 August 2012 in the Olympic Stadium, London. The chief guest was Prince Harry representing Queen Elizabeth II. The closing ceremony was created by Kim Gavin, Es Devlin, Stephen Daldry, David Arnold and Mark Fisher. The worldwide broadcast began at 21:00 BST (UTC+1) and finished on 13 August 2012 at 00:11, lasting three hours and eleven minutes.

The stadium had been turned into a giant representation of the Union Flag, designed by Damien Hirst. Around 4,100 people partook in the ceremony; which reportedly cost £20 million. The 2012 Summer Olympics were officially closed by Jacques Rogge, who called London's games "happy and glorious." The ceremony included a handover to the next host city for the 2016 Summer Olympics, Rio de Janeiro and saw the Olympic flame extinguished and the Olympic flag lowered. The main part of the evening featured a one-hour symphony of British Music as a number of British Pop acts appeared. Tributes to John Lennon and Freddie Mercury and the fashion industry were included in the section. Rio marked the handover with an eight-minute section known as "Embrace" created by Cao Hamburger and Daniela Thomas, featuring Pelé. Sebastian Coe gave a speech, and the volunteers of London 2012 were thanked.

An average of 23.2 million viewers in the United Kingdom watched the event, with an estimated 750 million worldwide. Critics were generally positive. There was also a concert in Hyde Park to close the Olympics, featuring Blur, New Order, and The Specials.

== Production ==
The creative director and choreographer was Kim Gavin, with Es Devlin responsible for design and David Arnold as musical director. When Arnold was announced in his role he said that doing the closing ceremony was an honour and a once-in-a-lifetime opportunity, while Gavin stated that he was really excited and honoured to be involved. Devlin said that she was delighted to be part of the "greatest show on earth". Hugh Robertson, Minister for Sport and the Olympics, stated that he was delighted to have a high-quality team working on the ceremony, while Boris Johnson stated that "we have the best of British creating the spectacular bookends of our Games". Stephen Daldry was the executive producer and Mark Fisher was in charge of production design. The ceremony cost £20 million, with the artists paid just £1 for contractual purposes. Around 4,100 performers took part, comprising 3,500 adult volunteers, 380 schoolchildren from the six original host boroughs, and 250 professionals. There had been around 15 rehearsals for the volunteers at the Three Mills Studio and at a full-scale site in Dagenham, East London.

Gavin said that "the show we are putting on is very shiny, it's very colourful. We don't want to bang on about our culture. We just want to have fun". Es Devlin added that it "has to make sense in Bognor and Bogotá." She said that the creators had happily indulged in the chance to "visually draw on everything" that British imagination can offer. David Arnold said "It's going to be beautiful, cheeky, cheesy, camp, silly and thrilling", and added that "we could have done this 15 times over, and not had the same show, and it would still have been full of amazing British music". He thought that it should be the "greatest after party" and was "really a celebration of Britishness in terms of [all] the arts". Arnold himself had devoted two years working on the ceremony and had turned down all other work including Skyfall, but said that it was the "most fun" he had "ever had in music". In the handover section Rio aimed to express "multicultural embrace." Daniela Thomas stated that Rio "want to show you how sophisticated we mix things, what we do with the things you believe we are, how we mix with pop culture."

The representation of the Union Flag used as an arena centrepiece was designed by Damien Hirst to celebrate the "anarchy and diversity of British pop art, and by extension the energy and multiplicity of contemporary British culture". Hirst had been approached in November 2011 and agreed to do the design; he called his artwork Beautiful Union Jack Celebratory Patriotic Olympic Explosion in an Electric Storm Painting. 176 photographs made up one centimetre of the stadium artwork with graphic designers having spent three months creating super-high-resolution images before printing.

Some performers had declined to perform, including The Rolling Stones, David Bowie, Sex Pistols, Kate Bush and The Libertines. According to industry insiders The Who apparently refused twice, and only agreed once they had announced a US tour. The Spice Girls were said to be reluctant to appear, feeling that the event was being staged at minimal cost, before their manager Simon Fuller persuaded them to perform. Noel Gallagher turned down the chance to perform after first being asked to play acoustically and then to mime to "Wonderwall".

The Queen and the Duke of Edinburgh were not scheduled to attend as there is no formal role for the Head of State during the ceremony. The royal family was represented by Prince Harry, the Princess Royal and the Duchess of Cambridge.

== Performance synopsis ==
=== Rush Hour (21:00–21:09 BST) ===
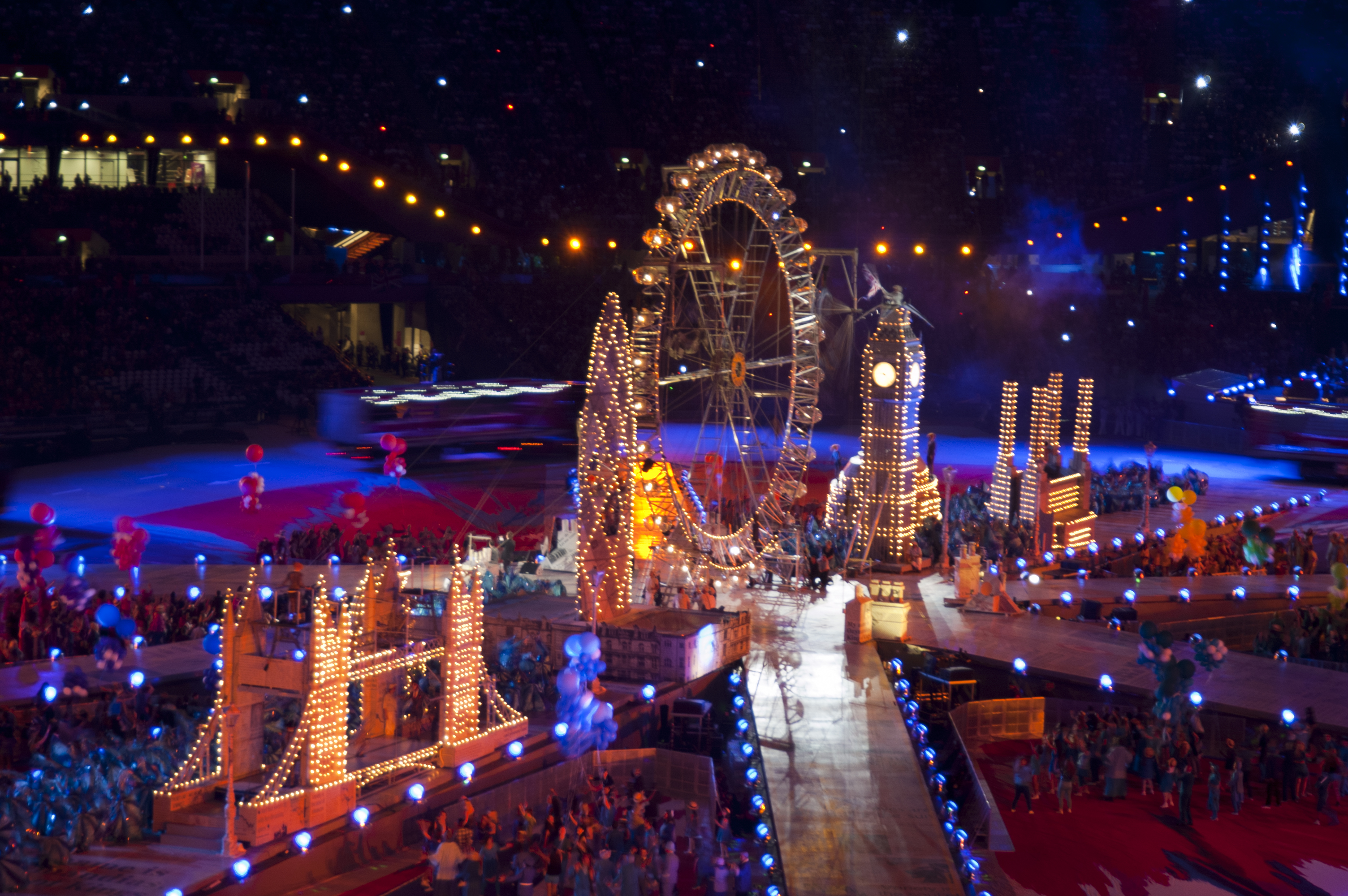
Landmarks in the stadium.

The ceremony began after a filmed countdown showing numbers from around London on such locations as road signs, 10 Downing Street and the Palace of Westminster clock tower, with a camera panning up the River Thames over Tower Bridge before turning left towards the stadium. The audience then completed a 10-second countdown to the start of the ceremony, to the chimes of Big Ben. The arena had been transformed into a huge representation of the Union Flag in black and white, with ramps and famous London landmarks such as the London Eye, Big Ben, Battersea Power Station and the Gherkin. Newspaper cutouts on both the set and road vehicles sought to show a "day in the life of London", with words from British literary figures such as William Shakespeare, J. R. R. Tolkien and Poet Laureate Carol Ann Duffy.

Emeli Sandé appeared on a truck and sang a verse and the chorus of "Read All About It, Pt. III". The Urban Voices Collective (the choir for the ceremony) sang The Beatles' "Because", which merged into cellist Julian Lloyd Webber (sitting upon the Royal Albert Hall) playing Elgar's Salut d'Amour, accompanied by Stomp performing on household items such as pots, pans and dustbins while suspended on the sculptures of the landmarks.

=== God Save the Queen ===
At the same time, former British Prime Minister Winston Churchill (Timothy Spall) appeared at the top of Big Ben and reprised Caliban's "Be not afeard" speech from The Tempest, first read by Victorian icon Isambard Kingdom Brunel (Kenneth Branagh) in the opening ceremony. More paper-covered motor vehicles entered. After Churchill finished his speech, people dressed in newspaper print began to fill the arena, ranging from office workers to school children. The beat of the music got faster and noisier, symbolising the London rush hour. As the noise reached a crescendo, Churchill cried out for all to stop, bringing this section to an end.

Prince Harry, representing the Queen, arrived with the president of the International Olympic Committee Jacques Rogge. The London Symphony Orchestra and the Urban Voice Choir performed the national anthem of the United Kingdom whilst the Union flag was raised by the armed forces and the performers waved mini Union flags in the stadium. Once the flag was raised Hirst's artwork was revealed as the grey clouds were removed.

=== Street Party (21:09–21:20) ===
This section started off with footage of Michael Caine in The Italian Job counting down from five, whereupon the Reliant Regal from Only Fools and Horses exploded with Del Boy and Rodney jumping out dressed as Batman and Robin. Caine's words, "You were only supposed to blow the bloody doors off!", echoed around the stadium. All the lorries had the newspaper removed and a colourful street party erupted, while Madness performed "Our House". This was followed by the Massed Bands of the Household Division marching whilst playing Blur's "Parklife". Entering on rickshaws, the Pet Shop Boys performed their hit "West End Girls", and then One Direction performed "What Makes You Beautiful" from the back of a lorry. Next there was another performance by Stomp.

=== Waterloo Sunset (21:20–21:30) ===
The centre of the arena was then cleared to reveal Britain's Got Talent 2010 winners Spelbound, who performed gymnastics to The Beatles "A Day in the Life", were inspired by the idea of a commuter on the way to work, by forming a bed and a London Bus. Ray Davies of The Kinks arrived in a black cab and played "Waterloo Sunset", as Spelbound continued and local school children formed the Thames. The section closed with Sandé reprising "Read All About It (Pt. III)" as a montage of athletes crying in victory or defeat was shown on the screens.

=== Parade of Athletes (21:30–21:53) ===
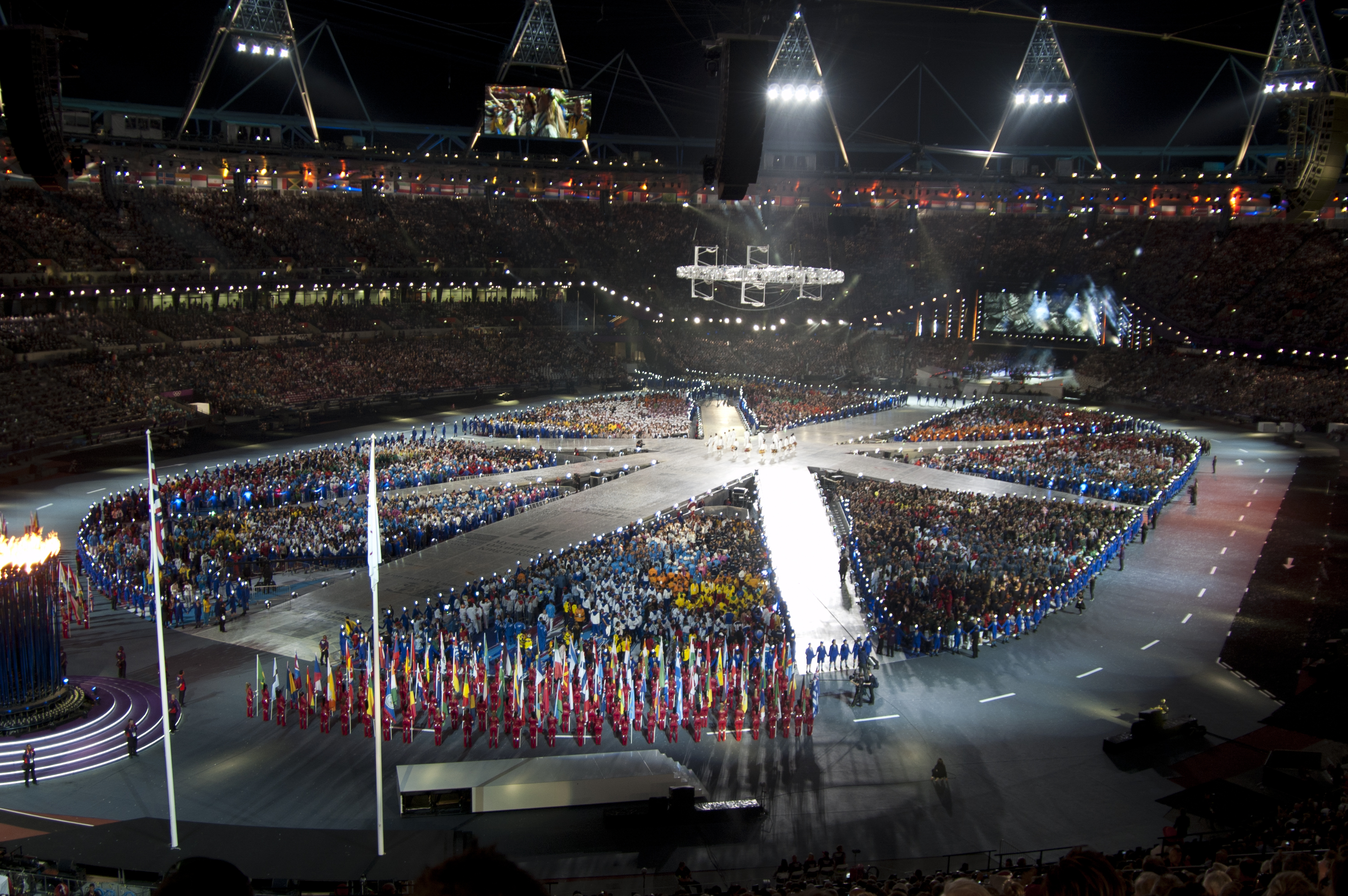
Olympic athletes assembled in the shape of the Union Flag

Greece led the Entrance of the Flags, as all 204 flags filed in to the strains of "Parade of the Athletes" (composed by Arnold) and marched up the central cross of the union flag, with Great Britain bringing up the rear. Meanwhile, volunteer marshals wearing blue suits and blue bowler hats with light bulbs on top marched into the stadium. The athletes then walked in from the several entrances, with some filtering down through the lower stands. At the same time Elbow performed "Open Arms" and "One Day Like This". The volunteer marshals helped to usher the athletes into pens between the ramps of the arena. As the last athletes streamed into the stadium and the flags were moved by volunteers closer to the Olympic flame, a reprise of some of the songs from the opening section was played.

=== Here Comes the Sun (21:53–22:07) ===
16 dhol drummers opened this segment as the performers entered carrying 303 white boxes to symbolise every event in the Olympic Games. The drumming merged into the newly recorded version of Kate Bush's "Running Up That Hill (A Deal With God)", as performers arranged the boxes to form a pyramid while video highlights from the previous 16 days of competition were shown on the screens.

This was followed by the victory ceremony for the Men's Marathon, by tradition the final medal ceremony of the Games. Rogge and Lamine Diack, president of the International Association of Athletics Federations, awarded the medals before the Ugandan national anthem was played.

Six athletes including Katherine Grainger and Katie Taylor presented flowers to six volunteers in a symbolic recognition of the 70,000 volunteers' contribution to the Games. This part of the ceremony was accompanied by The Beatles' "Here Comes the Sun".

=== A Symphony of British Music (22:07–23:21) ===
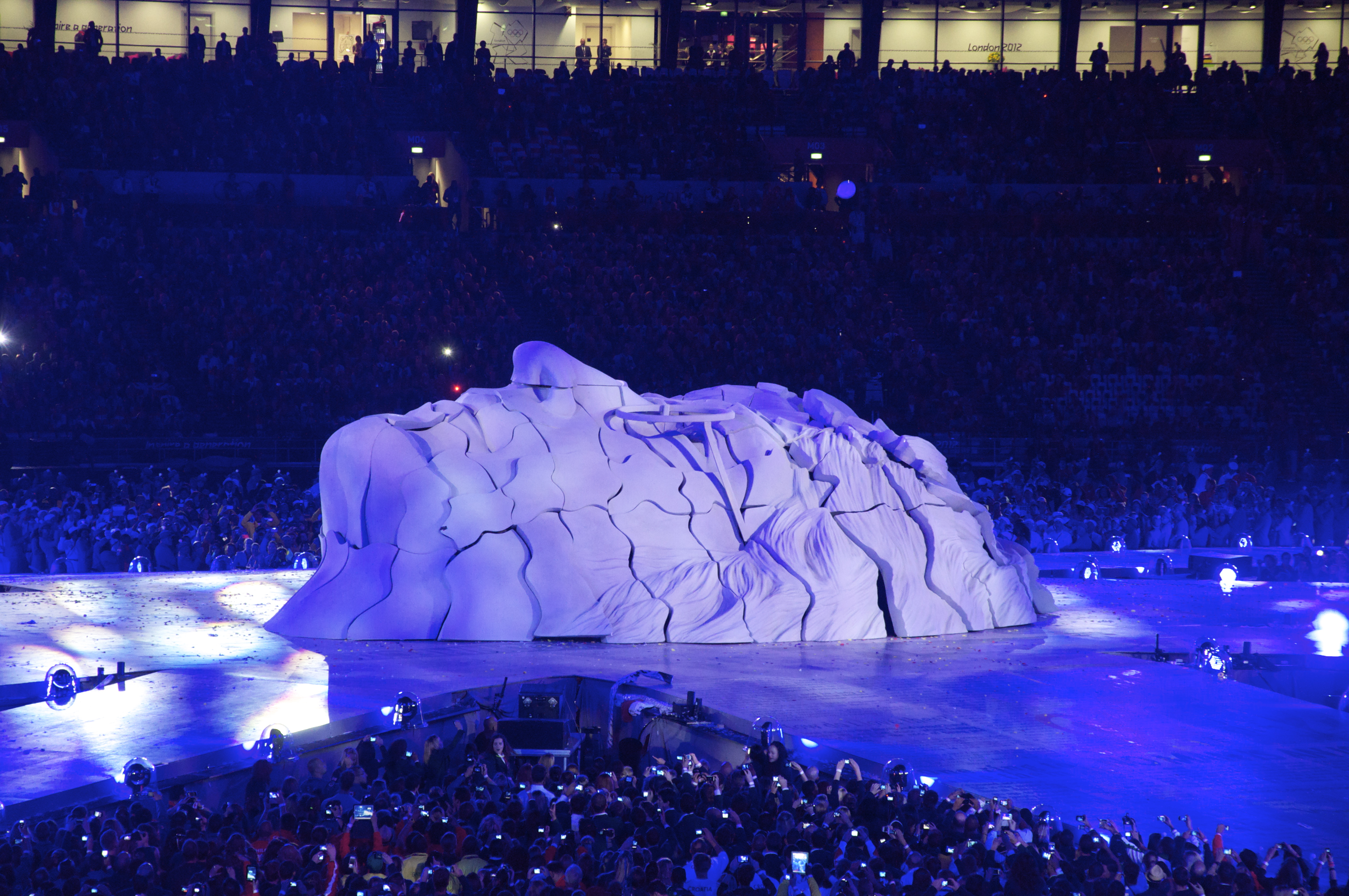
A sculpture of the face of John Lennon at the closing ceremony.

The section commenced with Queen's "Bohemian Rhapsody" being played and a graphic equaliser being shown on the pixel screen. John Lennon then appeared on the big screens and was joined by the Liverpool Philharmonic Youth Choir and the Liverpool Signing Choir in singing "Imagine" as a bust of Lennon's face was created. Balloons were released at the end of this and George Michael followed singing "Freedom! '90" and "White Light" (one of his last public concert appearances). A group of mods on scooters followed invading the arena; one of them carried Ricky Wilson to the stage where his band the Kaiser Chiefs proceeded to cover The Who's "Pinball Wizard"; during the song the scooters continued to circle the arena. Several extracts of David Bowie songs followed, accompanied by images of Bowie; this continued until eight billboards, escorted by gold clad dancers and drummers, with artwork of models on arrived in the stadium representing the British fashion industry. The artwork was dropped to reveal the models standing behind: Naomi Campbell (wearing Alexander McQueen), Lily Cole (wearing Erdem), Karen Elson (wearing Burberry), Lily Donaldson (wearing Vivienne Westwood), Jourdan Dunn (wearing Jonathan Saunders), David Gandy (wearing Paul Smith), Georgia May Jagger (wearing Victoria Beckham), Kate Moss (wearing Alexander McQueen) and Stella Tennant (wearing Christopher Kane). The models concluded the section by turning the struts of the Union Flag into a catwalk as they proceeded to the centre, walking to Bowie's 1980 single "Fashion".

A wooden boat was then carried in; on board was Annie Lennox who proceeded to sing "Little Bird". Ed Sheeran followed and was joined by Richard Jones of The Feeling, Nick Mason of Pink Floyd and Mike Rutherford of Genesis and Mike + The Mechanics, to cover Pink Floyd's "Wish You Were Here". Near the end of the song a performer appeared on a tightrope above the stadium, walked along it, and shook hands with a mannequin, which then burst into flames (referencing the cover of Floyd's 1975 album Wish You Were Here). A psychedelic bus then enters with Russell Brand sitting on top singing "Pure Imagination" from "Willy Wonka & the Chocolate Factory" then segues into "I Am the Walrus"; before introducing Fatboy Slim, who played "Right Here Right Now" and "The Rockafeller Skank"; as the bus slowly transformed into a large inflatable Octopus. Three convertible Rolls-Royce Phantom Drophead Coupés then arrived; the roof of the first was taken down to reveal Jessie J who sang her hit "Price Tag", as the cars did a lap of the stadium. Jessie J provided guest vocals as the next car had its roof removed, to show Tinie Tempah who sang "Written in the Stars". The third car carried Taio Cruz who sang "Dynamite". All three then left the cars to combine to cover the Bee Gees' "You Should Be Dancing".

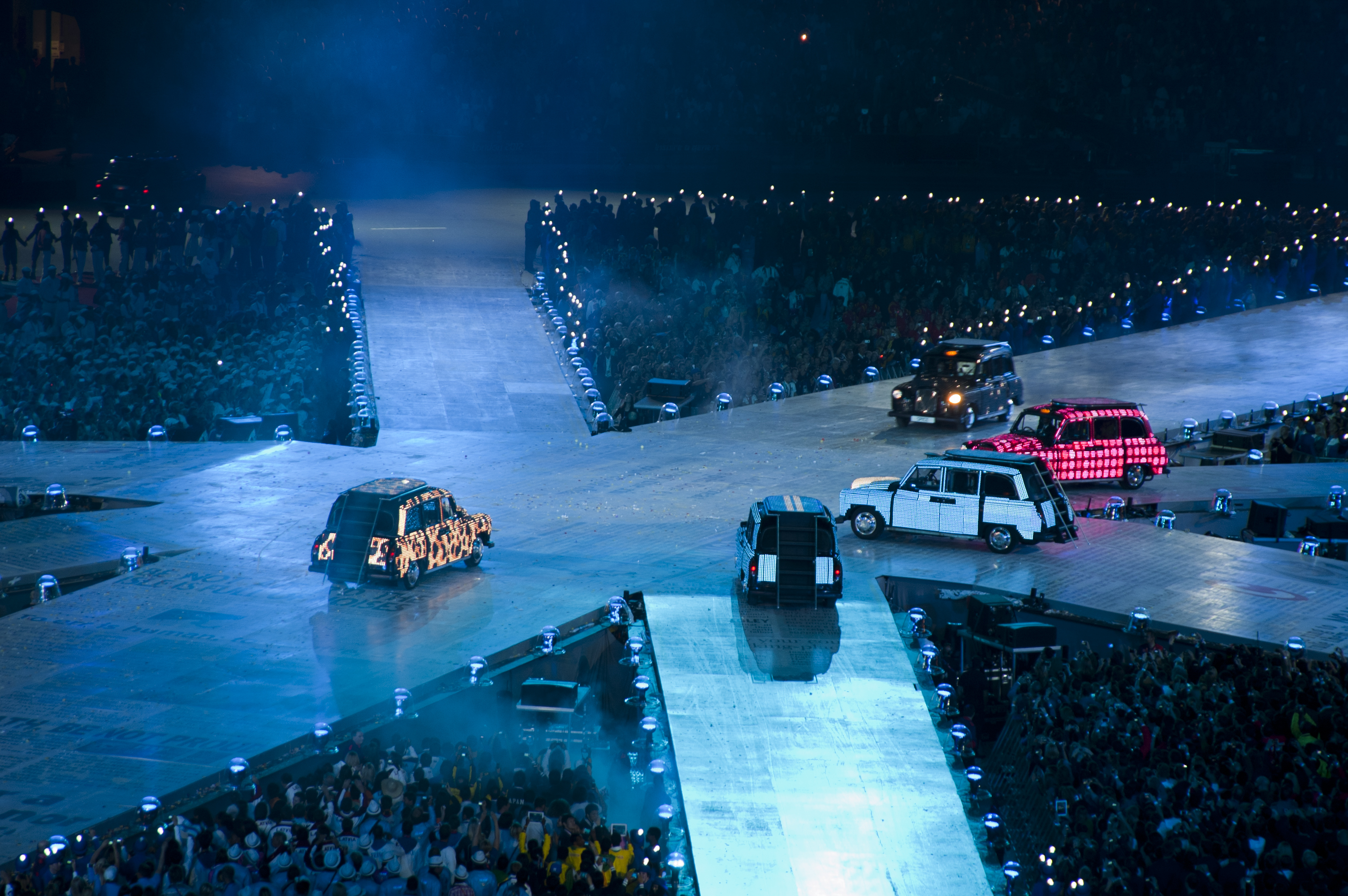
Cabs carrying the Spice Girls.

A number of black cabs entered the stadium, five of which lit up with LED lights, each decorated with the Spice Girls' individual trademark emblems, (Posh: sparkling black, Sporty: go-faster stripes, Scary: leopard print, Baby: pink and Ginger: The Union Flag). The Spice Girls emerged from the cabs and performed "Wannabe" and "Spice Up Your Life". Halfway through their performance, they ascended onto the roofs of the cabs and proceeded to race around the stadium whilst singing and dancing from the roofs. Beady Eye followed by performing Oasis's "Wonderwall". "Mr. Blue Sky" by Electric Light Orchestra was played, introduced by Matt Berry, as a tribute to aviation was performed. Near the end of this song a human cannonball "died" and out rolled Eric Idle, who sang "Always Look on the Bright Side of Life", accompanied variously by nuns on roller-skates (likely a reference to Monty Python and the Holy Grail), Morris dancers (Blackheath Morris and Rag Morris), Roman soldiers (a reference to Monty Python's Life of Brian, in which the song was first performed), Punjabi bhangra musicians dancers (VP Bhangra), and bagpipes (Reading Scottish Pipe Band, led by Pipe Major Ron Paterson) before a human cannonball was fired across the arena. Muse then appeared and proceeded to sing the official song of London 2012, "Survival". In the darkness four trucks with screens on them entered and went to the centre of the stadium. Freddie Mercury then appeared on these and other screens around the stadium. Displayed was a vocal improvisation taken from Queen's 1986 Wembley Stadium concert, before his bandmate Brian May performed part of the "Brighton Rock" guitar solo. May was then joined by Roger Taylor to re-form Queen, as Jessie J, who wore a long yellow jacket in homage to Mercury, accompanied the pair for "We Will Rock You." More fireworks ended this section.

=== Handover Ceremony (23:21–23:30) ===
The section began with the Greek national anthem being played and raising of the flag; followed by the Olympic anthem and the lowering of the flag. The Mayor of London, Boris Johnson, then handed the Olympic flag to Jacques Rogge, who in turn passed it to Eduardo Paes, the Mayor of Rio de Janeiro. This was followed by the Brazilian national anthem and raising of the flag. The Olympic flag was raised again in Sochi, Russia, on 7 February 2014 at the opening ceremony of the 2014 Winter Olympics.

=== Abraço (Embrace): Um alô do Rio de Janeiro (A hello from Rio de Janeiro) (23:30–23:38) ===
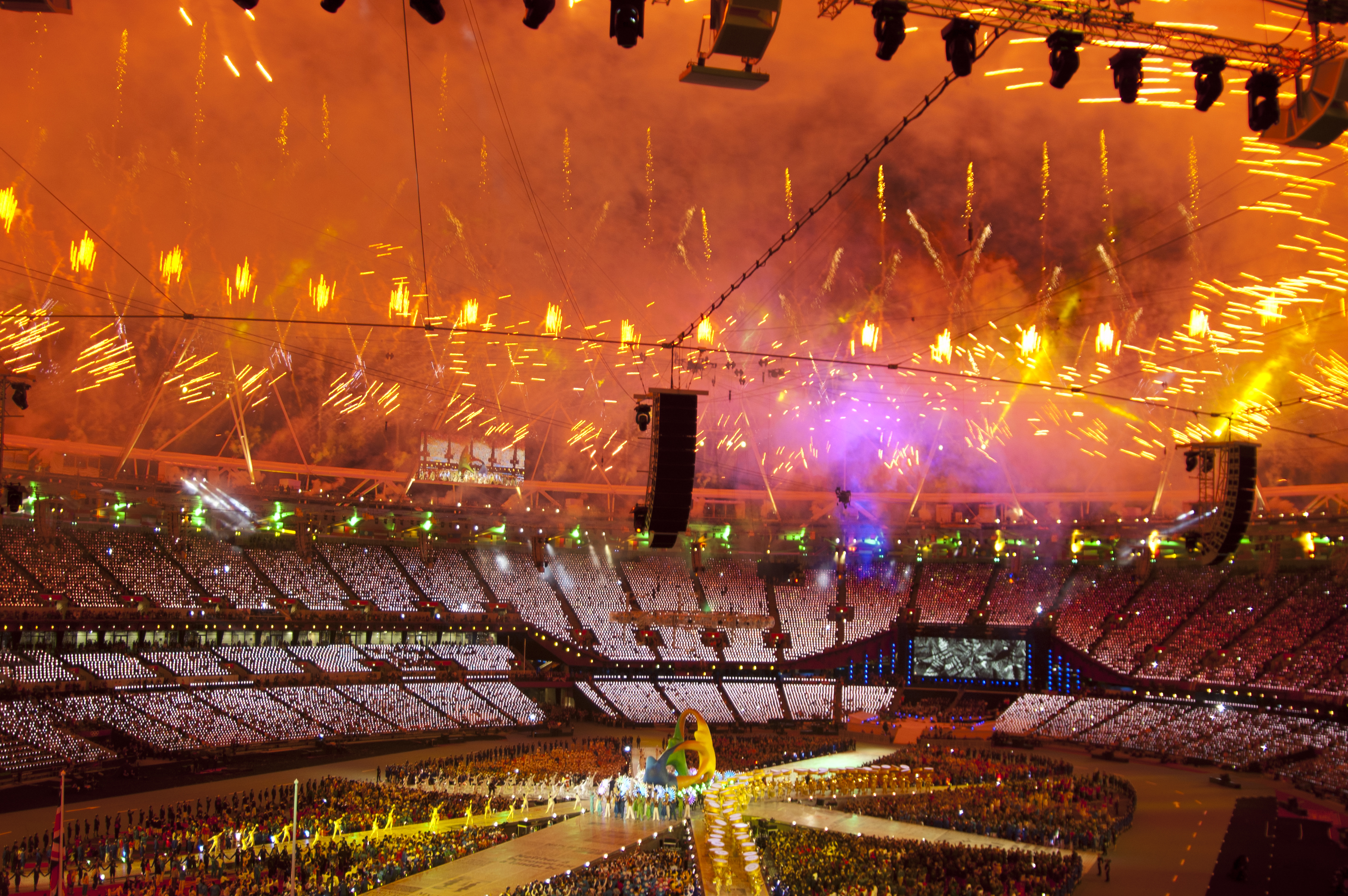
The end of Rio's segment.

Rio then provided an eight-minute segment to introduce the city and the country to the world, created by a team headed by the International Emmy Kids Awards winner Cao Hamburger and director Daniela Thomas entitled "Abraço" (which means hug or embrace). The showcase presented the Brazilian culture including the annual Rio Carnival and some local traditions such as the city's relationship with the sea. It began with the street cleaner Renato Sorriso dancing samba joined by sailor Robert Scheidt. The segment continued with a Carnival-eqsue Samba parade as various artists performed, including hit singer Marisa Monte (dressed as Brazilian-African sea goddess Yemanja representing the Brazilian religious syncretism) and the singers BNegão and Seu Jorge, who paid tribute to Chico Science and Jorge Mautner, representing the Manguebeat moviment from Pernambuco state. The modernist composer Heitor Villa-Lobos also received a tribute. Another appearance was by top model Alessandra Ambrósio, representing Brazilian fashion, and by Pelé wearing a Brazilian football shirt with his name and the number 10 on the back and a 3D inflated model of Rio's logo. This segment ended with a big firework display in green and yellow (the national colours).

=== Closing of the Games (23:38–23:48) ===
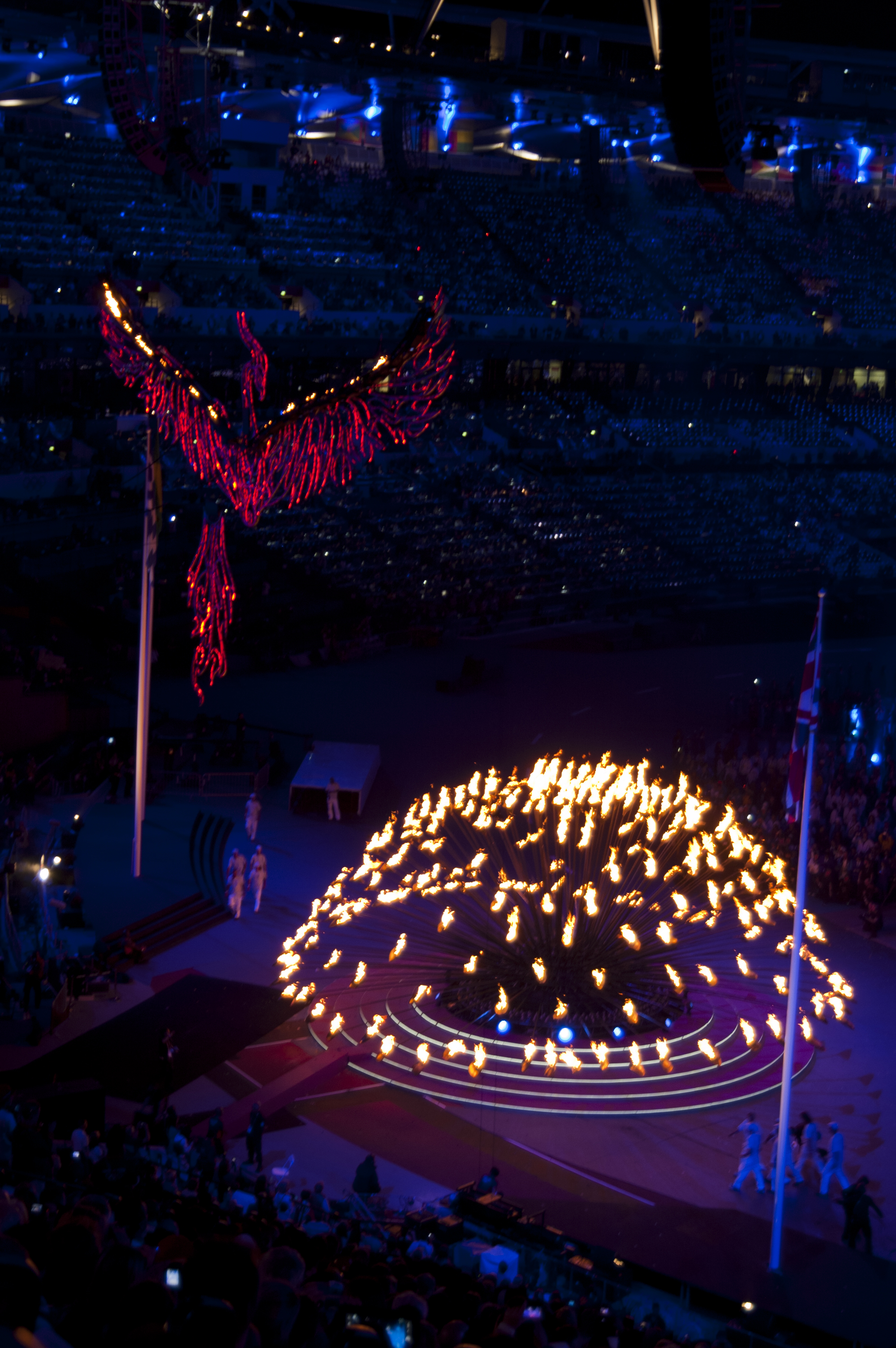
Opening of the Olympic cauldron.

Sebastian Coe and Jacques Rogge then appeared on a stage that was in the form of an arrow pointing towards Rio. Coe thanked all of the people who had helped make the Olympics happen. He said that the volunteers, who received another huge cheer, had the right to say "I made London, 2012". Coe thanked the country for getting behind the Games, and recalled his words from the opening ceremony "these will be a games for everyone", concluding "these were a games by everyone." He went on to thank the athletes and say that "the spirit of these Olympics will inspire a generation", before concluding that "when our time came, Britain, we did it right!".

Rogge thanked Coe and his London Organising Committee of the Olympic and Paralympic Games team, saying that they had done a "superb job". He said "we are indebted to so many tonight", thanking the "wonderful volunteers, the much needed heroes of these Games", as well as the British public and the athletes. Rogge said that the athletes had earned the right to be called 'Olympians' due to the fair play and graciousness that they had shown, and he looked forward to the Paralympic Games. Rogge concluded by calling the Games "happy and glorious", before proceeding to close the competition and calling upon the youth of the world to assemble in Rio in 2016, ending with "Thank you, London!".

=== Spirit of the Flame (23:48–00:00) ===
The arms holding the copper petals that formed the Olympic cauldron were part-lowered, and fireworks set off behind; when the smoke had cleared, a phoenix was seen above the flames. Take That then performed "Rule the World". Darcey Bussell followed flying down from the top of the stadium in a guise of a phoenix and was joined by four male principal dancers from The Royal Ballet, Gary Avis, Jonathan Cope, Nehemiah Kish and Ed Watson and over 200 ballerinas, who proceeded to perform a dance called 'the spirit of the flame', after which the Olympic Flame was extinguished.

=== Finale (00:00–00:07) ===
The closing act of the ceremony was The Who, who performed a medley of the songs "Baba O'Riley", "See Me, Feel Me" and "My Generation" as a montage of images of Games volunteers and Londoners appeared on the big screen. All star performers also appeared on the stage behind the band, while participants in the ceremony also marched through the centre stage towards The Who. The set concluded to massive fireworks set off in the stadium and around the Olympic Park.

== Technical aspects ==
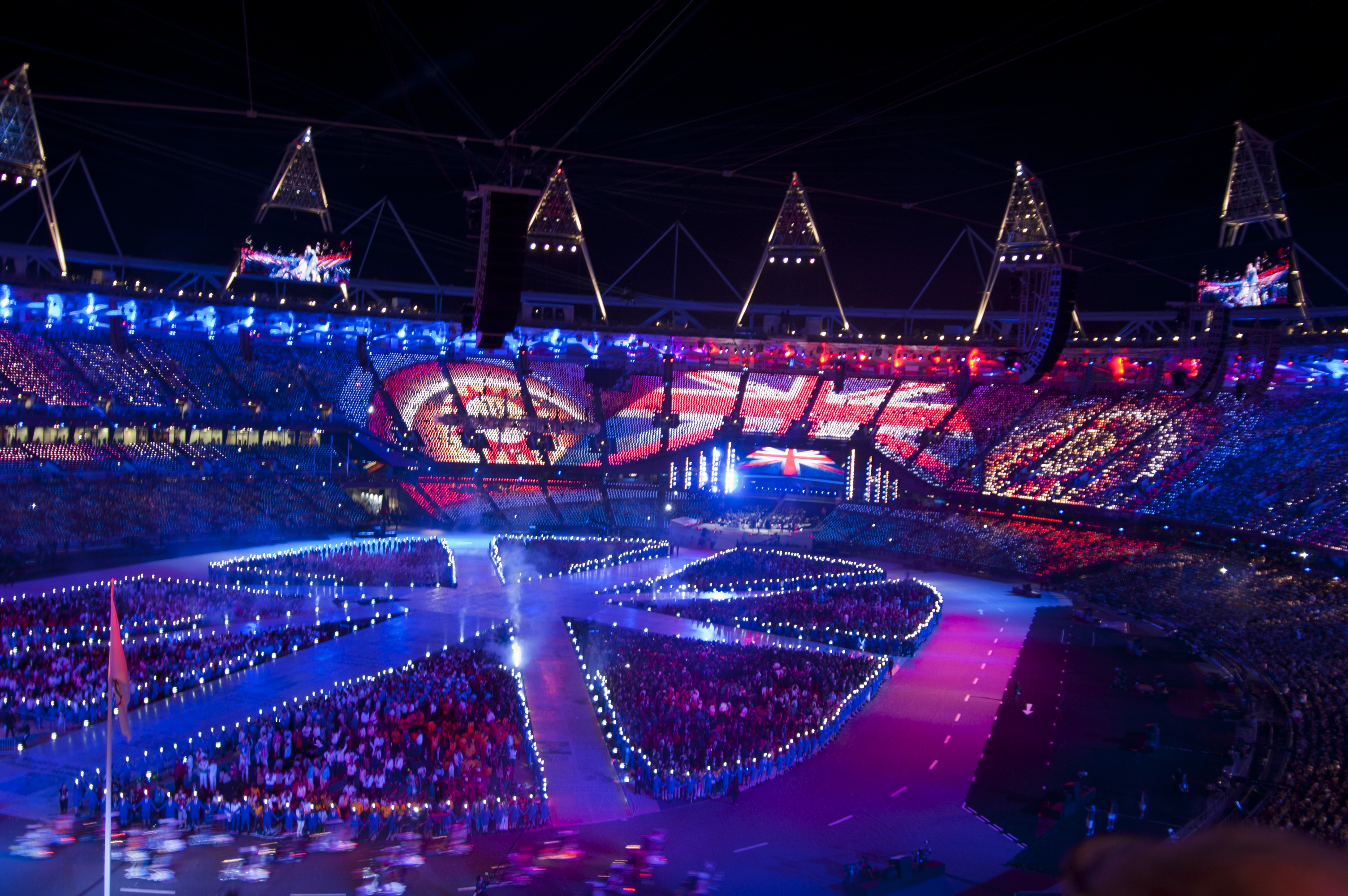
One of the images created with the pixels during the ceremony

A total of 634,500 individual LED pixels were used to create 27 images lasting 75 minutes. The pixels were created by Crystal CG and each animation was constructed by a team of six, whilst a team of eight created the Rio segment. Images, including catwalk models in high-end fashions, drifting clouds over London, and flicking paint onto rooftop canvases, had been shot for the effects.

The broadcast of the Olympic closing ceremony featured 1080p and side-by-side 1080i 3D on various TV channels and online.

== Ratings and reviews ==
An estimated worldwide television audience of 750 million watched the event. Early data suggested that the British TV audience averaged 23.2 million and hit a peak of 26.2 million at 21.35.

The Daily Telegraph commented during the ceremony that, although fun, it lacked "top drawer" performers, and that Annie Lennox was "utterly underwhelming." However One Direction, Jessie J, Tinie Tempah and Taio Cruz "shone", while the Spice Girls "got the exuberant tone exactly right". Tom Sutcliffe writing for The Independent said that it was "slick, impressive, often visually startling" and "eccentric, bewildering – and shameless good fun". He added that "where Danny Boyle's opening show had been a statement of intent and national values, this was an hour-long advert for British stadium rock-show design."

The Guardian writer Michael Billington wrote that he was not sure how to review "a mix of pageant, pop-concert, street-party and presentation ceremony." He added that it communicated the "energy of British popular culture over the past few decades and the gaiety of our Olympic ceremonies." Billington praised Boyle, Devlin and Daldry, who had done a "tremendous job in lending what might have been orthodox Olympic rituals a blast of theatrical vitality." While Alexis Petridis writing for the same paper said that the lack of a "gasp inducing moment" spoilt the show.

NZ Herald's Troy Rawhiti-Forbes wrote that there were "touches of brilliance, beauty, and bewilderment - often at the same time." However he called Russell Brand "tuneless", and during George Michael's performance he thought that "if there had been remote controls here in the stadium, people might have been reaching for them." His "undisputed champions" of the night were the Spice Girls and The Who. David Rooney of The Hollywood Reporter noted that the show "had something for every generation" and was an "all-star...crowd-pleaser." However he wonders whether non-British viewers would have understood references to The Italian Job and Only Fools and Horses. Rooney concludes that the "Rio preview and the rousing Britpop marathon that preceded it were a reminder that the Olympics are as much about spectacle as sport."

Gary Barlow was called "inspirational, brave and a consummate professional" after performing despite his wife having had a stillborn baby on 4 August. However, George Michael attracted some criticism for singing his new song "White Light" at the ceremony. Critics saw this as shameless promotion. Michael replied that it was his one chance to thank his supporters, which he didn't regret. It was his first appearance since almost dying from pneumonia and "White Light" was about that experience. Appearances by Russell Brand, Naomi Campbell and Kate Moss were also seen as controversial, as their previous behaviour had not always reflected Olympic ideals.

== International broadcast issues ==
United States broadcaster NBC was criticised for its coverage in a Forbes article by John Clarke, who emphasised the omission of performances from Ray Davies and Muse, as well as the delay in The Who's performance by an hour to broadcast the pilot of the sitcom Animal Practice followed by the late local news. New Zealand broadcaster Prime TV was criticised for delayed coverage, running 20 minutes behind Sky Sport. In the Philippines, TV5 was criticised because it only aired the first hour of coverage of the ceremony, incorporating highlights into its next morning news programme, Good Morning Club.

== Music ==
Many artists appeared live, yet others were recordings.

- Emeli Sandé – "Read All About It (Part III)"
- Urban Voices Collective – "Because"
- Julian Lloyd Webber featuring London Symphony Orchestra – "Salut d'Amour"
- London Symphony Orchestra - "God Save the Queen"
- Madness featuring the Hackney Colliery Band – "Our House"
- Massed Bands of the Guards Division – "Parklife"
- Pet Shop Boys – "West End Girls"
- One Direction – "What Makes You Beautiful"
- The Beatles – "A Day in the Life"
- Ray Davies – "Waterloo Sunset"
- Emeli Sandé – "Read All About It (Part III)" [Reprise]
- London Symphony Orchestra – "Parade of Nations/Athletes" (David Arnold cover)
- Elbow featuring Urban Voices Collective & London Symphony Orchestra – "Open Arms", "One Day Like This"
- Madness featuring Hackney Colliery Band – "Our House" [Reprise]
- Household Division Ceremonial State Band – "Parklife" (Blur cover) [Reprise]
- Pet Shop Boys – "West End Girls" [Reprise]
- One Direction – "What Makes You Beautiful" [Reprise]
- Kate Bush – "Running Up that Hill (A Deal with God) (2012 Remix)"
- David Arnold – "Medal Ceremony"
- London Symphony Orchestra – "Oh Uganda, Land of Beauty"
- Urban Voices Collective – "Here Comes the Sun" (The Beatles cover)
- Queen – "Bohemian Rhapsody"
- Liverpool Philharmonic Youth Choir featuring John Lennon – "Imagine"
- George Michael – "Freedom! '90", "White Light"
- Kaiser Chiefs – "Pinball Wizard"
- David Bowie – "Space Oddity", "Changes", "Ziggy Stardust", "The Jean Genie", "Rebel Rebel", "Diamond Dogs", "Young Americans", "Let's Dance", "Fashion"
- Annie Lennox – "Little Bird"
- Ed Sheeran featuring Nick Mason, Mike Rutherford and Richard Jones – "Wish You Were Here"
- Russell Brand featuring London Symphony Orchestra – "Pure Imagination"
- Russell Brand featuring Bond – "I Am the Walrus" (The Beatles cover)
- Fatboy Slim – "Right Here, Right Now", "The Rockafeller Skank"
- Jessie J – "Price Tag"
- Tinie Tempah featuring Jessie J – "Written in the Stars"
- Taio Cruz – "Dynamite"
- Jessie J, Tinie Tempah and Taio Cruz – performing "You Should Be Dancing" (The Bee Gees Cover)
- Spice Girls – "Wannabe", "Spice Up Your Life"
- Beady Eye – "Wonderwall"
- Electric Light Orchestra – "Mr. Blue Sky"
- Eric Idle accompanied by soprano Susan Bullock (as Britannia), Hackney Colliery Band, London Welsh Rugby Club, Reading Scottish Pipe Band and Blackheath Morris Men – "Always Look on the Bright Side of Life"
- Muse – "Survival"
- Freddie Mercury – "Vocal Improvisation" (Live at Wembley Stadium)
- Queen – "Brighton Rock"
- Queen featuring Jessie J – "We Will Rock You"
- London Symphony Orchestra – "Ýmnos is tin Eleftherían"
- London Symphony Orchestra featuring London Welsh Male Voice Choir and London Welsh Rugby Club Choir – "Olympic Hymn"
- London Symphony Orchestra – "Hino Nacional Brasileiro"
- Marisa Monte – "Bachianas Brasileiras No. 5"
- BNegão – "Maracatu Atômico" (Jorge Mautner cover)
- Seu Jorge – "Nem vem que não tem" (Wilson Simonal cover)
- Marisa Monte featuring BNegão and Seu Jorge – "Aquele Abraço" (Gilberto Gil cover)
- London Symphony Orchestra – "Extinguishing the Flame"
- Take That featuring Urban Voices Collective – "Rule the World"
- John Barry – "The John Dunbar Theme" from Dances with Wolves
- David Arnold – "Spirit of the Flame"
- The Who – a medley composed of "Baba O'Riley," "See Me, Feel Me" and "My Generation"

54 bands played live and were recorded in total.

== Anthems ==
- National Anthem of the United Kingdom – London Symphony Orchestra and the Urban Voices Collective
- National Anthem of Greece
- (International Olympic Committee) Olympic Anthem
- National Anthem of Brazil

=== Victory ceremonies ===
- National Anthem of Uganda (Note: Anthem played as part of the Men's marathon victory ceremony.)

== See also ==
- 2012 Summer Olympics opening ceremony
- 2012 Summer Paralympics opening ceremony
- 2012 Summer Paralympics closing ceremony
- 2010 Winter Olympics opening ceremony
- 2010 Winter Olympics closing ceremony
