= Yuhui Choe =

Korean ballet dancer

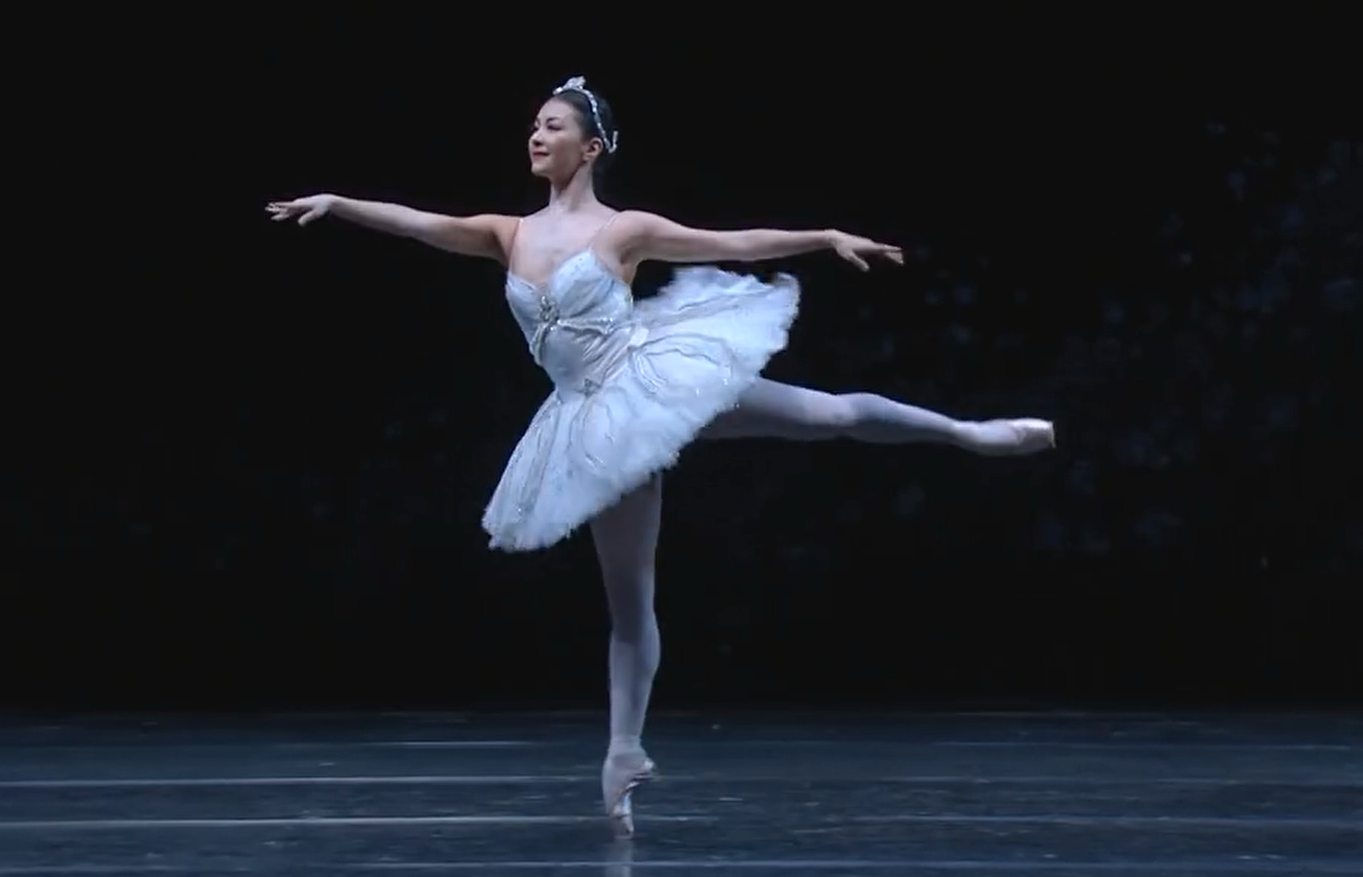
- Choe in La Bayàdere (production of Natalia Makarova)
- Born: 1986 (age 39–40); Fukuoka, Japan
- Occupation: ballet dancer
- Years active: 2002–present
- Spouse: Nehemiah Kish (m. 2018)
- Children: 2
- Career
- Current group: The Royal Ballet

Yuhui Choe (Korean: 최유희,崔由姬) is a Korean ballet dancer. She is a first soloist at The Royal Ballet.

== Early life ==
Choe was born in Fukuoka, Japan. Choe started ballet training at the age of five. At the age of 14, Choe left her family and moved to Paris to train with Daini Kudo and later Dominique Khalfouni. She stated one of the reason why she chose Paris is because Élisabeth Platel was her idol.

== Career ==
In 2002, Choe joined The Royal Ballet as an apprentice after she won first prize and the contemporary dance prize at the Prix de Lausanne. She became an Artist the following year. In 2004, she danced her first solo role, as Princess Florine in The Sleeping Beauty. She was named First Artist in 2006 and First Soloist in 2008. Two of her first roles as First Soloist are Nikiya in La Bayadère and Sugar Plum Fairy in The Nutcracker, and she was one of six women chosen to create roles in Wayne McGregor's Infra. She has also danced roles in The Two Pigeons, Don Quixote and Elite Syncopation. Choe also frequently works with Jonathan Watkins. In 2009, The Guardian chose Choe as the dancer on their "hotlist" of rising stars to watch, quoting Lauren Cuthbertson, "I can't take my eyes off her. She radiates joy in the purest sense". In 2014, Choe had to replace the injured Natalia Osipova at short notice as Princess Aurora, her debut in the lead role in Sleeping Beauty. Osipova's appearance was eagerly anticipated. The Guardian noted that Choe "appeared radiantly unfazed by the challenge" and that "Choe should be promoted to principal now".

== Selected repertoire ==
Choe's repertoire with the Royal Ballet includes:

- The title role - Cinderella
- Alice - Alice's Adventures in Wonderland
- Princess Aurora - Sleeping Beauty
- Nikiya, Gamzatti & Shades La Bayadère
- Sugar Plum Fairy & Rose Fairy - The Nutcracker
- Lise - La Fille mal gardée
- Young Girl - The Two Pigeons
- Lescaut's Mistress - Manon
- Polyhymnia Apollo
- Woolf Works
- Scènes de ballet
- Rhapsody
- Symphonic Variations
- Concerto
- 'Emeralds' and 'Rubies' - Jewels
- Chroma
- Symphony in C
- Song of the Earth
- Within the Golden Hour

=== Created roles ===
- As One
- 'Diana and Actaeon' (Metamorphosis: Titian 2012)
- Infra
- Limen
- 'Fire' (Homage to The Queen)
- DGV: Danse à grande vitesse
- The Human Edge

== Awards ==
- 2000 Paris International Dance Competition - silver
- 2002 Prix de Lausanne - first prize and the contemporary dance prize
- 2008 Critics' Circle National Dance Award - Best Female Artist (Classical)
- 2016 Asian Women of Achievement Awards (Arts and Culture) - nominated

== Personal life ==
In 2018, Choe married Nehemiah Kish, a former Principal Dancer at The Royal Ballet. They have a daughter (born January 2021).
