= Gary Avis =

English ballet dancer

Gary Avis MBE
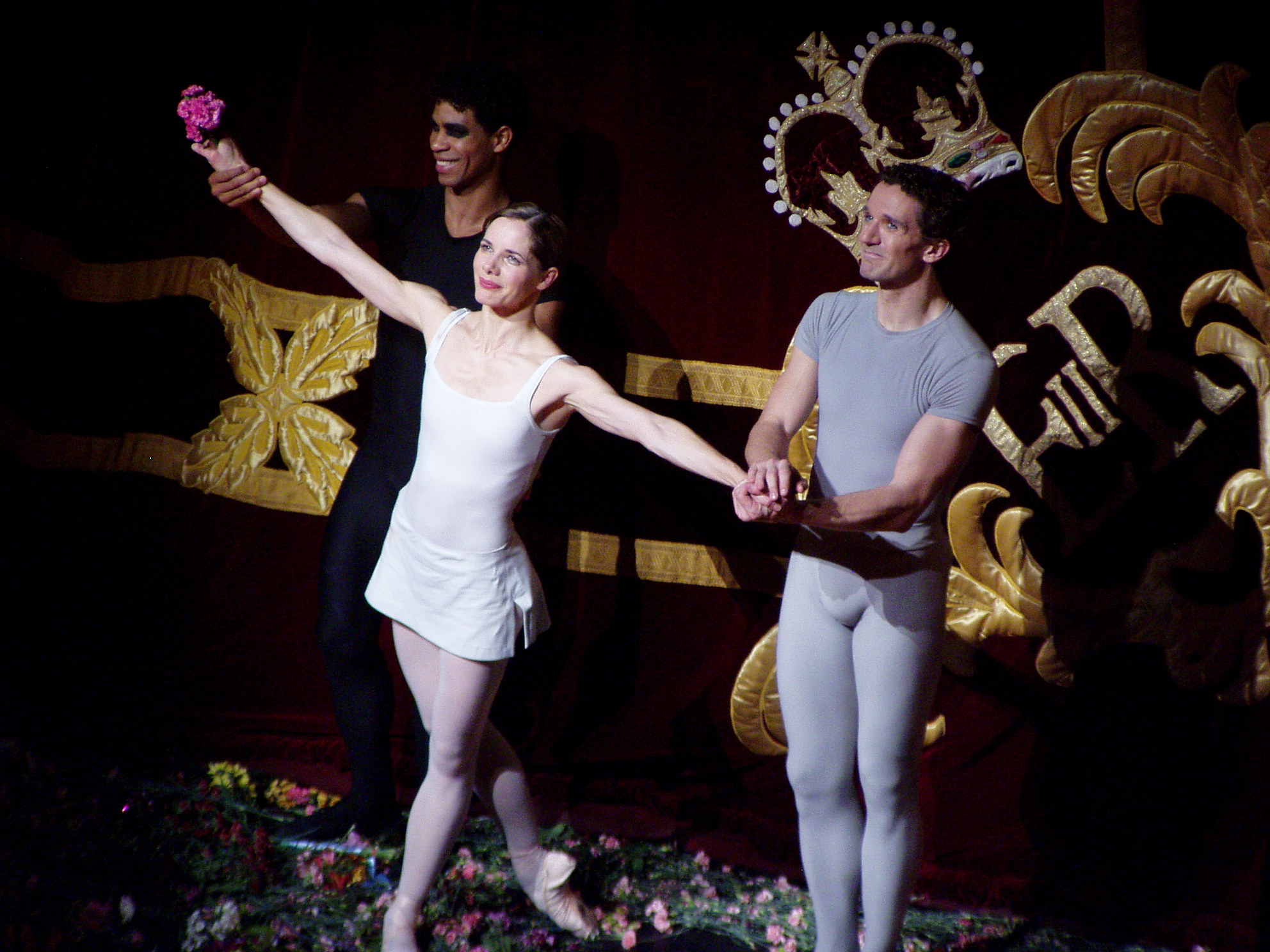
- (Left to right) Carlos Acosta, Darcey Bussell and Gary Avis at the curtain call of Bussell's farewell performance
- Born: 1969 or 1970 (age 56–57); Ipswich, England
- Education: Bird College; The Royal Ballet School
- Occupation: ballet dancer
- Partner: Tim Holder
- Dancing career
- Current group: The Royal Ballet
- Former groups: K-ballet; English National Ballet

Gary Avis is an English ballet dancer, who was a principal character artist and senior ballet master with The Royal Ballet, London, until his retirement in 2025.

== Early life ==
Avis was born in Ipswich. He was first trained in musical theatre, and had performed in the Royal Variety Performance. He did not start ballet until he was 12. He then studied musical theatre at Bird College in Kent. Avis later started training at The Royal Ballet School in London after a teacher from Bird College filled in the application form for him.

== Career ==
Avis joined The Royal Ballet in 1989, and became a soloist in 1995. In 1999, he co-founded K-ballet in Japan. In 2002, he joined the English National Ballet as a First Soloist before returning to the Royal Ballet in 2004. He was made Principal Character Artist the following year. In 2007, he was appointed Assistant Ballet Master, and was named Ballet Master in the 2009/10 season. In 2019, Avis was made Senior Ballet Master. He had portrayed character roles such as Drosselmeyer in The Nutcracker, Von Rothbart in Swan Lake and Prince Gremin in Onegin. His role creations include Woolf Works, for which he danced with Alessandra Ferri. His retirement from The Royal Ballet was announced in November 2025.

Avis is a frequent partner of Darcey Bussell. In her final performance, which was broadcast live, Avis danced with Bussell and Carlos Acosta in Song of the Earth. Avis later danced in Bussell and Katherine Jenkins's tour, Viva la Diva and on Strictly Come Dancing, where Bussell was a judge. In 2012, Avis performed at the London Olympics closing ceremony, in a sequence titled 'Spirit of the Flame', choreographed by Christopher Wheeldon and composed by David Arnold. Bussell flew to the stage on a flaming phoenix and when landing was met by Avis, Jonathan Cope, Edward Watson, Nehemiah Kish and over 200 ballet dancers, after which the Olympic Flame was extinguished.

Avis won the National Dance Awards for Outstanding Male Performance (Classical) in 2011 and 2019. He was made an MBE in 2018. He also has an honorary doctorate from the University of Suffolk, and had worked with the Art and Culture Fund at Suffolk Community Foundation.

== Personal life ==
Avis is in a civil partnership with Tim Holder. They live in rural Suffolk.
