= The Prince of the Pagodas (MacMillan) =

The Prince of the Pagodas is a ballet created by Kenneth MacMillan in 1989 for the Royal Ballet, London, based on the original 1957 John Cranko version. The music is by Benjamin Britten. The scenario was by Colin Thubron, the set and costume designer was Nicholas Georgiadis, and the lighting designer was John B Read.

The first performance was at the Royal Opera House, Covent Garden on 7 December 1989. The lead roles were danced by Darcey Bussell and Jonathan Cope.

== Original cast ==
- Darcey Bussell
- Jonathan Cope
- Tetsuya Kumakawa
- Fiona Chadwick
- Anthony Dowell

== See also ==
- The Prince of the Pagodas
