= Élisabeth Platel =

French prima ballerina (born 1959)

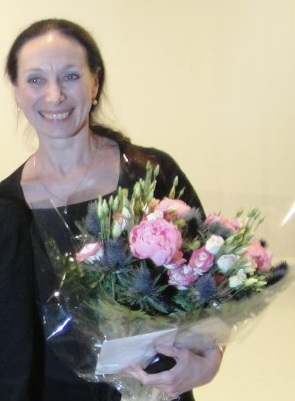
- Born: 10 April 1959 (age 66); Paris, France
- Occupation: Ballerina

Élisabeth Platel (born 10 April 1959) is a French prima ballerina.

== Career ==
After studying at the conservatoire in Saint-Germain-en-Laye, she entered the Conservatoire de Paris in 1971, graduating with First Prize, which allowed her to complete her studies at the École de Danse de l'Opéra National de Paris. Influential teachers of Platel were Pierre Lacotte, who worked with her in the Paris Opera School and Raymond Franchetti, who owned a studio where the budding dancer was able to watch professional artists taking class, among others soloists from the Paris Opera like Noëlla Pontois, or guest stars like Rudolf Nureyev.

Élisabeth entered the corps de ballet of the Paris Opéra Ballet in 1976 as a quadrille at the age of 17. She advanced quickly to successive ranks of the company's hierarchy. The following year she was promoted to coryphée. In 1978 she became sujet and danced her first soloist roles in ballets by George Balanchine, Divertimento No. 15 and The Four Temperaments. In 1979, at nineteen, she was appointed première danseuse.

In 1981 Platel started to prepare her first great classical ballet, La Sylphide with Pierre Lacotte, her former teacher. La Sylphide, a landmark work from 1832 which introduced romanticism in ballet and made Marie Taglioni a world-famous ballerina, became one of Platel's signature roles during her career at the Paris Opera. In that same year she also learned and danced the leading roles in Swan Lake, Paquita, and Giselle. Upon her debut as Giselle on 23 December 1981 she was nominated "étoile".

When Rudolf Nureyev was invited in 1981 to mount his Don Quixote for the Paris Opera, he chose Platel to dance the Queen of the Dryads. For Platel, it meant the beginning of a successful artistic collaboration with Nureyev, who became one of the most important figures in her career, especially when he was director of the Paris Opera Ballet (1983–1989).

In 1983, Nureyev mounted his first full-length ballet as recently appointed director of the Paris Opera Ballet, Marius Petipa's late masterpiece Raymonda. Platel was chosen to dance the title role at the premiere. The following year, she created the roles of Odette/Odile in Nureyev's new version of Swan Lake for the Paris Opera. Swan Lake is her most frequently performed ballet. Nureyev also entrusted her with the creation of the leading roles in his versions of The Sleeping Beauty (1989) and his final work for the Paris Opera La Bayadère in 1992.

Platel has been a guest artist with Royal Ballet (London), Danish Royal Ballet, Hamburg Ballet, Ballet of the Vienna Opera, Ballet of the Berlin Opera, Finnish National Ballet, Bolshoi Ballet, Kirov Ballet, Royal New Zealand Ballet, Les Grands Ballets Canadiens, Municipal Theatre in Rio de Janeiro.

== Retirement from the Paris Opéra Ballet ==
On 9 July 1999, Platel gave her farewell performance as danseuse étoile of the Paris Opera in La Sylphide. At that time, Paris Opéra rules required female étoiles to retire at 40 (male étoiles retired at 45). Now, female and male étoiles retire at 42 and a half. For the occasion she performed with two of her favourite partners, Nicolas Le Riche and Manuel Legris, who danced the role of James Act I and II respectively.

Élisabeth Platel continued to perform with the Paris Opera as "étoile invitée" (principal guest artist). In 2000 she performed La Bayadère and Raymonda, in 2001 A Midsummer Night's Dream. On 20 January 2003 she took part in the Gala performance for Rudolf Nureyev at the Palais Garnier, dancing the variation from Raymonda Act III.

Élisabeth Platel succeeded Claude Bessy as director of the École de Danse de l'Opéra at the beginning of the 2004-2005 season.

She currently serves as a Jury Member for the Youth America Grand Prix.

== Repertoire ==
- Le Spectre de la rose, (Fokine), young girl 1978.
- Divertimento No. 15 (Balanchine), soloist 1978.
- The Four Temperaments (Balanchine), third theme 1978.
- Le Bourgeois Gentilhomme (Balanchine), pas de deux 1979.
- Life (Béjart), soloist 1979.
- Serait-ce la mort? (Béjart), soloist 1979.
- The Sleeping Beauty (Petipa, staged Alonso), Lilac Fairy 1979.
- Schema (Nikolais), soloist 1980.
- Le sacre du printemps" (Béjart), The chosen one 1980.
- Vaslaw (John Neumeier), 1980.
- Giselle (Petipa after Coralli Perrot, staged Alonso), Myrtha 1980.
- La Sylphide (Lacotte after Taglioni), title role 1981.
- Swan Lake (Vladimir Bourmeister after Petipa, Ivanov), Odette-Odile 1981.
- Giselle (Petipa after Coralli Perrot, staged Alonso), title role 1981.
- Paquita (Vinogradov after Petipa), title role 1981.
- Don Quixote (Nureyev after Petipa), Queen of the Dryads 1981.
- Three preludes (Stevenson), soloist 1981.
- Le chant du rossignol" Massine, the nightingale 1981.
- The Sleeping Beauty (Petipa, Nijinska, staged Hightower) princess Aurora 1982.
- Voluntaries (Tetley), soloist 1982.
- Serenade (Balanchine), soloist 1982.
- Pas de Quatre (Dolin), Lucille Grahn 1982.
- Raymonda (Nureyev after Petipa), title role 1983.
- Don Quixote (Nureyev after Petipa) Kitri 1983.
- Agon (Balanchine), pas de deux 1983.
- La Bayadère Act III "Kingdom of the Shades" (Nureyev after Petipa - Royal Ballet, London), Nikiya 1984.
- Marco Spada (Lacotte after Mazillier), Marquise 1984.
- Violin Concerto (Balanchine), soloist 1984.
- Carnaval (Fokine), Estrella 1984.
- Premier Orage Childs, soloist cr 1984.
- Swan Lake (Nureyev after Petipa, Ivanov), Odette-Odile 1984.
- Coppelia (Skouratoff - Ballet de Bordeaux), Swanilda 1985.
- Palais de Cristal Symphony in C" (Balanchine), 2nd movement 1985.
- Concerto Barocco (Balanchine), soloist 1985.
- Before Nightfall (Christe), soloist 1985.
- Jardin aux Lilas (Tudor), Caroline 1985.
- Song of the Earth (MacMillan), soloist 1985.
- La Sonnambula (Balanchine - Ballet de Nancy), title role 1985.
- Sonate à trois (Béjart), soloist 1986
- Manfred (Nureyev), the countess 1986.
- Cinderella (Nureyev), title role 1986.
- Grosse Fugue (van Manen), soloist 1986.
- Apollo (Balanchine), Terpsichore 1987.
- Symphony in Three Movements (Balanchine), soloist 1987.
- Sans Armes Citoyens! van Dantzig, Woman of the people 1987.
- Magnificat Neumeier, soloist cr 1987.
- Suite en blanc (Lifar), soloist 1987.
- Four Last Songs (van Dantzig), soloist 1987.
- Les anges ternis (Armitage), soloist cr 1987.
- Etudes (Lander), soloist 1988.
- In the Middle, Somewhat Elevated (Forsythe), soloist 1988.
- Notre-Dame de Paris Petit, Esmeralda 1988.
- The Sleeping Beauty (Nureyev after Petipa), princess Aurora 1989.
- Les Présages (Massine), soloist 1989.
- In The Night (Robbins), soloist 1989.
- Le Fils prodigue" (Balanchine), the Siren 1989.
- Sinfonietta (Kylian), soloist 1990.
- Les Noces (Nijinska), the bride 1990.
- Variations (S. Lifar), 1st variation 1990.
- A Midsummer Night's Dream (J. Neumeier), Titania 1991.
- Les Biches (Nijinska), chanson dansée "la Garçonne " 1991.
- Glass Pieces (Robbins), soloist 1991.
- Dances at a Gathering (J. Robbins), soloist 1991.
- La dame aux camélias (Neumeier - Hamburg Ballet), Marguerite 1992.
- La Bayadère (Nureyev after Petipa), Gamzatti 1992.
- Les forains (Petit) 1993.
- The Nutcracker (Neumeier) 1993.
- Till Eulenspiegel (after Nijinski) 1994.
- La Bayadère (Nureyev after Petipa), Nikiya 1995.
- Rhapsody (Ashton), soloist 1996.
- Allegro Brillante (Balanchine), soloist 1996.
- Sylvia (Neumeier), 1997

== Prizes ==
- 1978 : Silver medal (Junior Prize) in the International Ballet Competition at Varna, Bulgaria.
- 1982: Laurence Olivier Award for Outstanding First Achievement of the Year in Ballet for her role in La Sylphide by Pierre Lacotte
- 1983: West End Theatres Award
- 1998: Prix Massine
- 1999: Benois de la Danse for her role in Sylvia by John Neumeier

== Honours ==
- 1993: Chevalier des Arts et Lettres
- 1998: Chevalier de la Légion d'honneur
