= Tetsuya Kumakawa =

Japanese ballet dancer

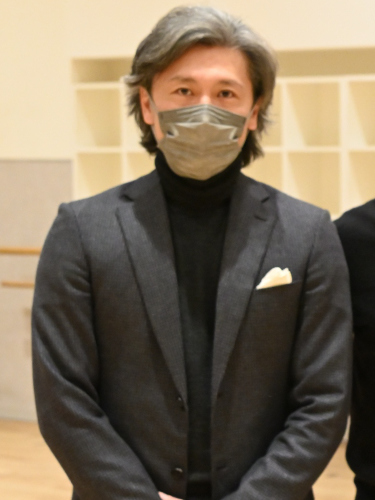

Tetsuya "Teddy" Kumakawa (熊川 哲也, Kumakawa Tetsuya; born 5 March 1972) is a Japanese ballet dancer and a former principal dancer with the Royal Ballet.

== Early life ==
Tetsuya Kumakawa was born on 5 March 1972 in Asahikawa, Hokkaido, Japan. He began studying ballet at 10 years old. At age 15, he moved to the UK and trained at the Royal Ballet School, before joining The Royal Ballet in 1989 and becoming the youngest soloist in their history. He was promoted to first soloist in 1991, and principal dancer in 1993.

== Career ==
Kumakawa won the gold medal and the then newly established Prince Takamado Prize at the 1989 Prix de Lausanne and returned as a jury member in 2013.

With The Royal Ballet, Kumakawa has danced roles such as 'Lead Mandolin Player' in Romeo and Juliet, the Act 1 pas de trois in Pyotr Ilyich Tchaikovsky's Swan Lake, The bronze Idol in La Bayadère, and 'The Fool' in the premiere of Kenneth Macmillan's The Prince of the Pagodas.

In 1998, Kumakawa and five other leading male dancers from the Royal Ballet, Stuart Cassidy, Gary Avis, Matthew Dibble, Michael Nunn, and William Trevitt, left to form K-ballet. He set up the K-Ballet School for young dancers in 2003.

In 1999, Kumakawa appeared as a guest judge on the show Iron Chef.

In 2006, Kumakawa won the "fifth Asahi Scenic Art Prize" for his artistic and original interpretation and presentation of the classical pieces Don Quixote and The Nutcracker.

In 2023 he was a jury member at Prix de Lausanne ballet competitions.
