= National Dance Awards 2006 =

To recognise excellence in professional dance in the United Kingdom, The Critics' Circle organised and presented the National Dance Awards 2006. The ceremony was held at the Sadler's Wells Theatre, London, on 25 January 2007, with awards given for productions staged in the previous year.

== Awards presented ==
- De Valois Award for Outstanding Achievement in Dance - Ivor Guest, dance historian and writer
- Best Male Dancer - Carlos Acosta, for performances with his own company and The Royal Ballet
- Best Female Dancer - Miyako Yoshida, for performances as a Principal of The Royal Ballet
- Working Title Billy Elliot Prize - Brad Corben and Joseph Poulton
- Audience Award - Northern Ballet Theatre and Independent Ballet Wales
- Dance UK Industry Award - Val Bourne CBE
- Best Choreography (Classical) - Alexei Ratmansky, for The Bright Stream
- Best Choreography (Modern) - Wayne McGregor, for Amu
- Best Choreography (Musical Theatre) - Twyla Tharp
- Emerging Male or Female Artist (Classical) - Steven McRae, for performances with The Royal Ballet
- Emerging Male or Female Artist (Modern) - Alexander Varona, freelance dancer
- Company Prize for Outstanding Repertoire (Classical) - Les Ballets Trockadero de Monte Carlo
- Company Prize for Outstanding Repertoire (Modern) - Phoenix Dance Theatre
- Best Foreign Dance Company - The Bolshoi Ballet, for performances at the Royal Opera House
- Patons Award - Strictly Come Dancing

== Special awards ==
No special awards were presented for the 2006 season.
