= The Prince of the Pagodas =

1957 ballet by Benjamin Britten and John Cranko

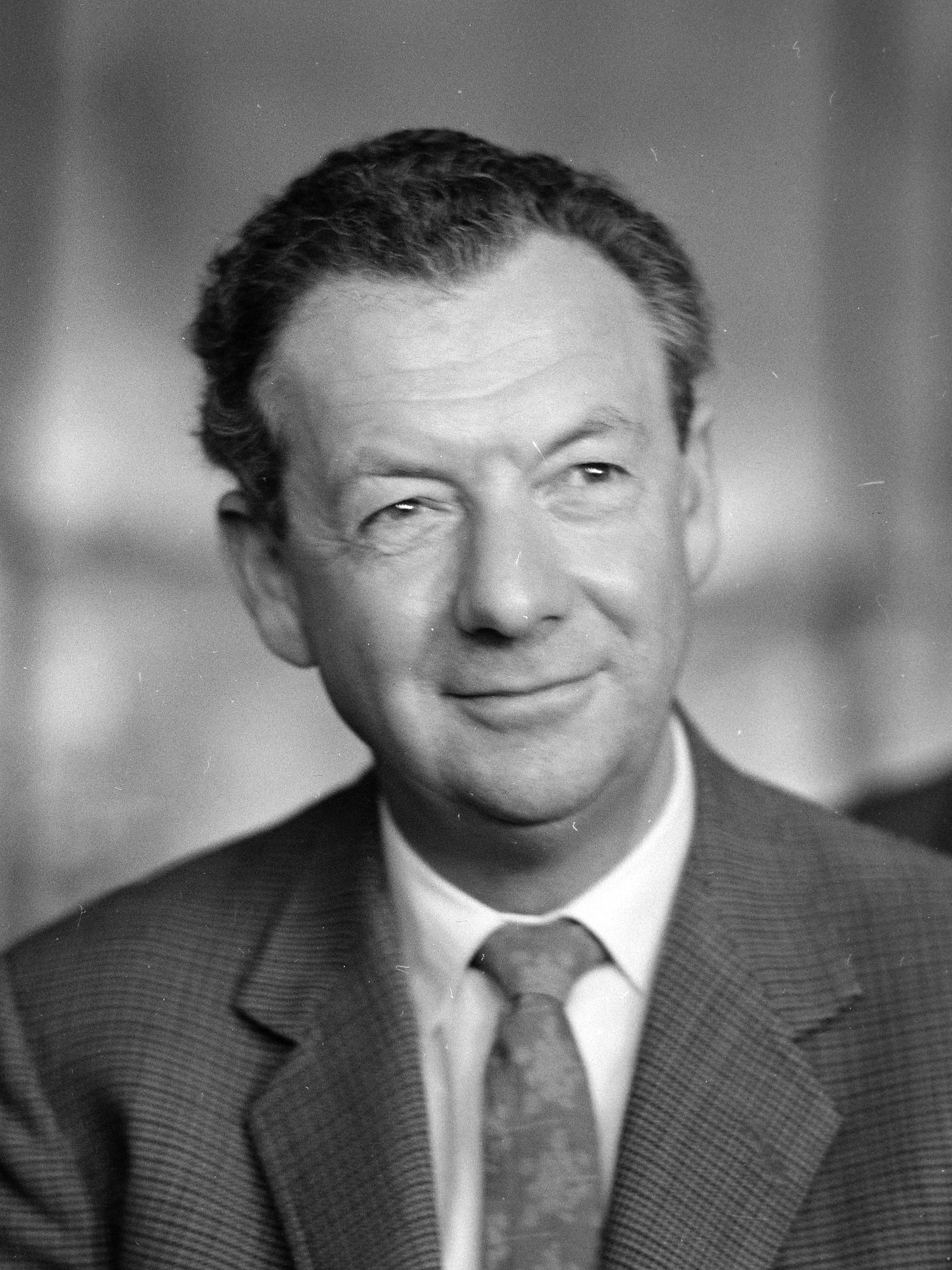
Benjamin Britten in 1965

The Prince of the Pagodas is a ballet created for The Royal Ballet by choreographer John Cranko with music commissioned from Benjamin Britten. Its premiere took place on 1 January 1957 at the Royal Opera House, Covent Garden, London, conducted by Britten.

In February 1957 a recording of a slightly cut version of the score was made by Decca with Britten conducting the Orchestra of the Royal Opera House.

The ballet was revived at the same venue on 7 December 1989 in a new production by Kenneth MacMillan, achieving acclaim for Darcey Bussell's work in a principal role. Another production, set in Japan, was created by David Bintley for the National Ballet of Japan and premiered by that company on 30 October 2011; this was adopted by Birmingham Royal Ballet and danced in 2014 at The Lowry, Salford, Greater Manchester.

== Background ==
In January 1954, Sadler's Wells Ballet announced that Cranko was collaborating with Benjamin Britten to create a ballet. Cranko devised a draft scenario for a work he originally called The Green Serpent, fusing elements drawn from King Lear, Beauty and the Beast (a story he had choreographed for Sadler's Wells in 1948) and the oriental tale published by Madame d'Aulnoy as Serpentin Vert. Creating a list of dances, simply describing the action and giving a total timing for each, he passed this to Britten and left him to compose what eventually became The Prince of the Pagodas.

Britten dedicated the score to Imogen Holst and Ninette de Valois.

== Plot synopsis ==
An Emperor must decide which of his two daughters should inherit the throne, and he chooses the evil older sister Belle Epine over the young and beautiful Belle Rose. Belle Rose is taken by magical flying frogs to Pagoda Land, and meets the Prince of Pagoda Land who is in the guise of a Salamander. Belle Rose and the Prince return to the land of her father and confront her evil sister, in the end driving her away.

== Influence of Balinese gamelan on the music ==
Britten incorporated many elements of Balinese gamelan music into the score of The Prince of the Pagodas, including simulating the seven-tone pelog tuning on Western instruments. Britten was first exposed to gamelan music by Canadian composer Colin McPhee, who had lived in Bali from 1931 until 1938. Britten utilized a "pseudo-gamelan" sound in several of his works, including Paul Bunyan and Peter Grimes, after meeting McPhee. Britten also performed works of other composers which included references to gamelan music, such as Francis Poulenc's Concerto for Two Pianos and Orchestra, which Britten performed with the composer in 1945 and again in 1955, after he had agreed to write a ballet with Cranko.

However, perhaps the most influential experience in gamelan music for Britten was a two-week holiday he took in Bali in 1956. He made a thorough study of gamelan music while he was there and immediately began incorporating Balinese musical ideas into The Prince of the Pagodas. For example, in the Prelude of the ballet, the Salamander Prince theme is played by several instruments in a layered texture, where the instruments are playing in different keys and start the theme at slightly different times in a technique called polyphonic stratification, which is typical of Balinese gamelan music.

Another way in which Britten achieves a gamelan sound is through his instrumentation. His score calls for a variety of percussion instruments, including gong, cymbals, bells, xylophone, and vibraphone, and uses these Western percussion instruments in different ways to produce a gamelan sound. For instance, Britten combines the sounds of an orchestral gong and a double bass to represent the Balinese colotomic gong.

The pentatonic scale, a signature of Oriental music in general, makes frequent appearances in the ballet as well, especially in trumpet fanfares which occur throughout the piece. The interval of the major second appears throughout Britten's gamelan passages, which is normally considered dissonant in Western music but arises from the alternate scales and tunings of gamelan style music.

Britten uses the gamelan sound in his music to symbolize the magical pagodas of Pagoda Land, where the main character, the princess Belle Rose, is taken after a confrontation with her father, the emperor, and her evil sister, Belle Epine. When Belle Rose enters Pagoda Land, she is greeted with gamelan music. Similarly, when the Salamander enters the scene, he is portrayed alongside softer gamelan music to produce a mystical air. The Salamander is revealed to be the human Prince of Pagodaland, and when he changes to a human form, the gamelan music is replaced with more traditional Western orchestral music.

== Productions ==
=== Cranko ===
- Production premiere: 1 January 1957
- Choreographer: John Cranko
- Composer: Benjamin Britten
- Set designer: John Piper
- Costume designer: Desmond Heeley
- Lighting designer: William Bundy

=== MacMillan ===
- Production premiere: 7 December 1989
- Choreographer: Kenneth MacMillan
- Composer: Benjamin Britten
- Scenario: Colin Thubron
- Set designer: Nicholas Georgiadis
- Costume designer: Nicholas Georgiadis
- Lighting designer: John B. Read

This production was dedicated to Margot Fonteyn.

=== Bintley ===
- Production premiere: 30 October 2011
- Choreographer: David Bintley
- Composer: Benjamin Britten
- Company: National Ballet of Japan
- Location: New National Theatre Tokyo
- Design: Rae Smith
- Lighting designer: Peter Teigen
