= Hackney Colliery Band =

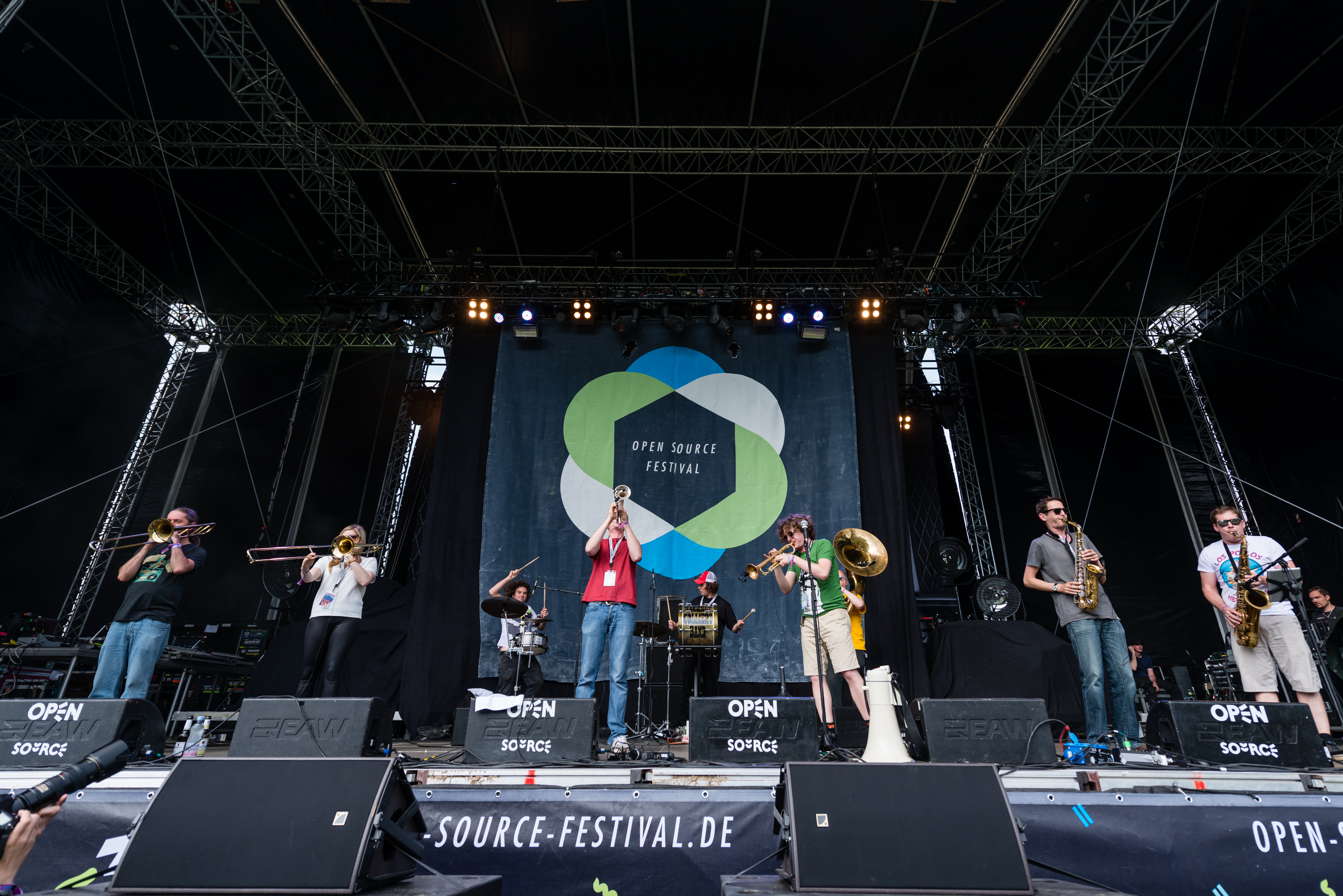
Performance in Düsseldorf, 2014

Hackney Colliery Band is a British jazz brass band from Hackney, London. It plays music inspired by New Orleans jazz and funk.

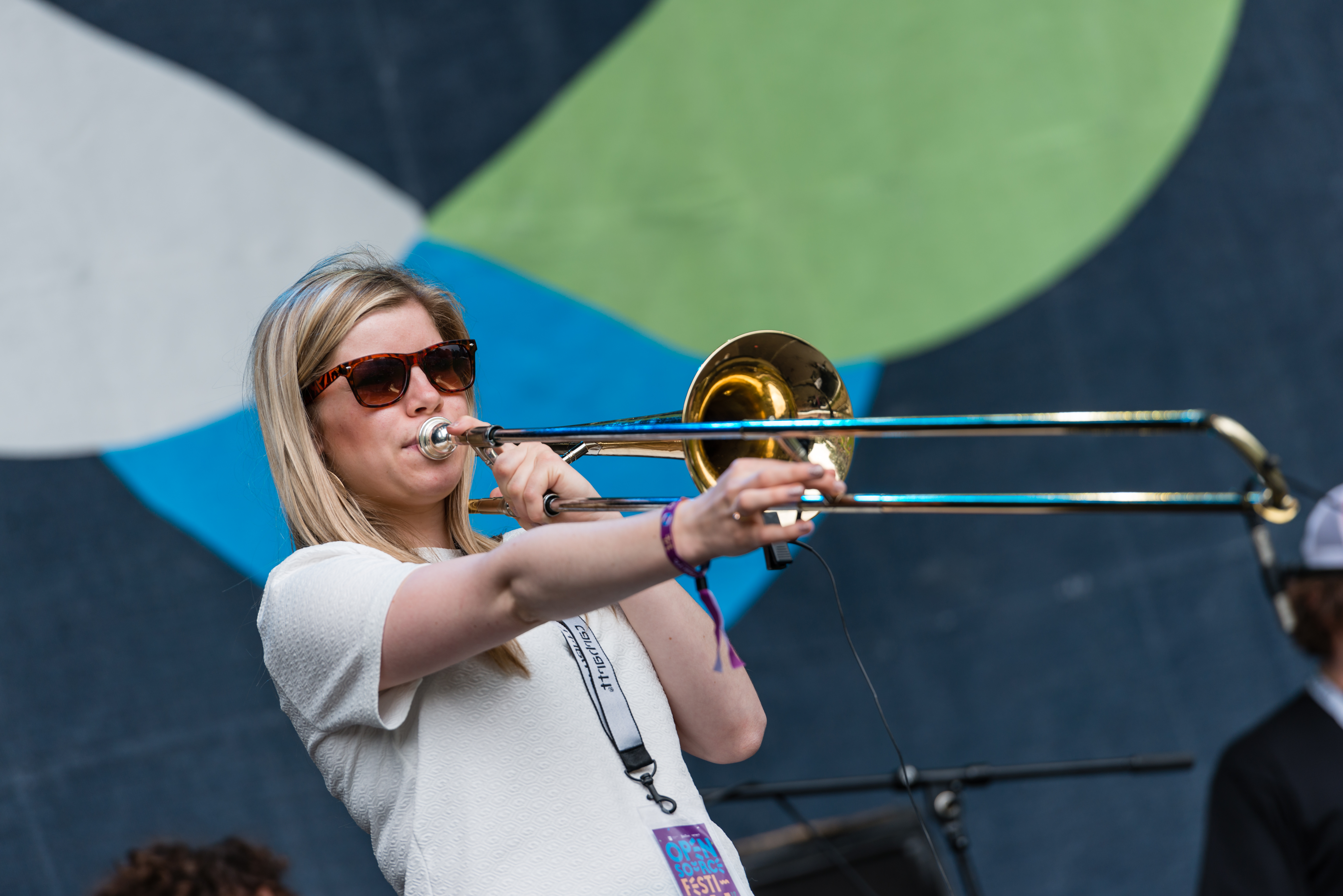

The band's name is an in-joke, as there is no colliery (coal mine) in Hackney, but this is a common name for traditional British brass bands founded by colliery workers.
