= Darcey Bussell =

British ballerina (born 1969)

Dame Darcey Bussell DBE
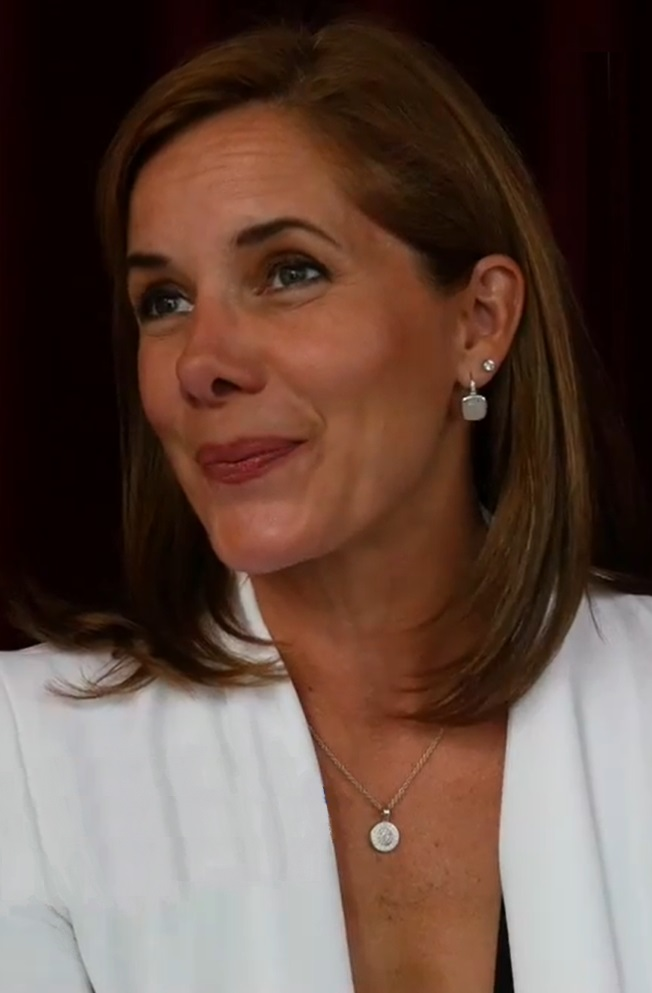
- Bussell in 2016
- Born: Marnie Mercedes Darcey; Pemberton Crittle; 27 April 1969 (age 57); London, England
- Occupations: Ballet dancer (active until 2007); Judge on Strictly Come Dancing (2009, 2012–2018)
- Spouse: Angus Forbes (m. 1997)
- Children: 2
- Parent(s): John Crittle; Andrea Williams

Dame Darcey Andrea Bussell (born Marnie Mercedes Darcey Pemberton Crittle; 27 April 1969) is a retired English ballerina and a former judge on the BBC television dance contest Strictly Come Dancing.

Trained at the Arts Educational School and the Royal Ballet School, Bussell began her professional career at Sadlers Wells Royal Ballet. In 1989, at the age of 20, she moved to The Royal Ballet, where she became the youngest-ever principal dancer.

Bussell remained with The Royal Ballet for her entire career, more than two decades. She however performed as a guest artist with many companies including the New York City Ballet, La Scala Theatre Ballet, the Kirov Ballet, Hamburg Ballet and the Australian Ballet. She retired from ballet in 2007.

== Early life ==
Bussell was born Marnie Crittle in London to Andrea Williams, an English model and actress, and John Crittle an Australian businessman.

Her parents divorced when she was three years old, and her mother remarried Australian dentist Philip Bussell, who became her adoptive father. The family spent some time in Australia, where Bussell attended school before they returned to London for Bussell to be educated at Fox Primary School in Kensington. Her very first dance classes were at the Mercury Theatre, home of the Rambert dance company. She was diagnosed with dyslexia at the age of nine. At school she excelled at physical activity, and this influenced her career path.

== Career ==
Bussell studied "all forms of stagecraft" at the Arts Educational School. In 1982, at the age of 13, she joined the Royal Ballet Lower School, based at White Lodge, Richmond Park. At 16, she progressed to the Royal Ballet Upper School in Baron's Court. While there, she competed in and won the prestigious Prix de Lausanne, before later joining the Sadler's Wells Royal Ballet in 1987. While studying at the Royal Ballet School, she appeared in a number of school productions, including performances at Covent Garden.

In 1988, while still at school, Bussell was given a leading role by choreographer Kenneth MacMillan, in his ballet The Prince of the Pagodas, which led to her moving to the Royal Ballet. A year later in 1989, on the opening night of the show, she was promoted to principal dancer, and at just 20 years old, was the youngest ever in the history of the company.

Bussell performed all the major classical roles numerous times throughout her career, including Masha in Winter Dreams and Princess Rose in The Prince of the Pagodas, both choreographed by MacMillan, as well as Princess Aurora in The Sleeping Beauty, Odette/Odile in Swan Lake, Nikiya and Gamzatti in La Bayadère, the Sugar Plum Fairy in The Nutcracker, Manon in L'histoire de Manon, and Giselle in Giselle.

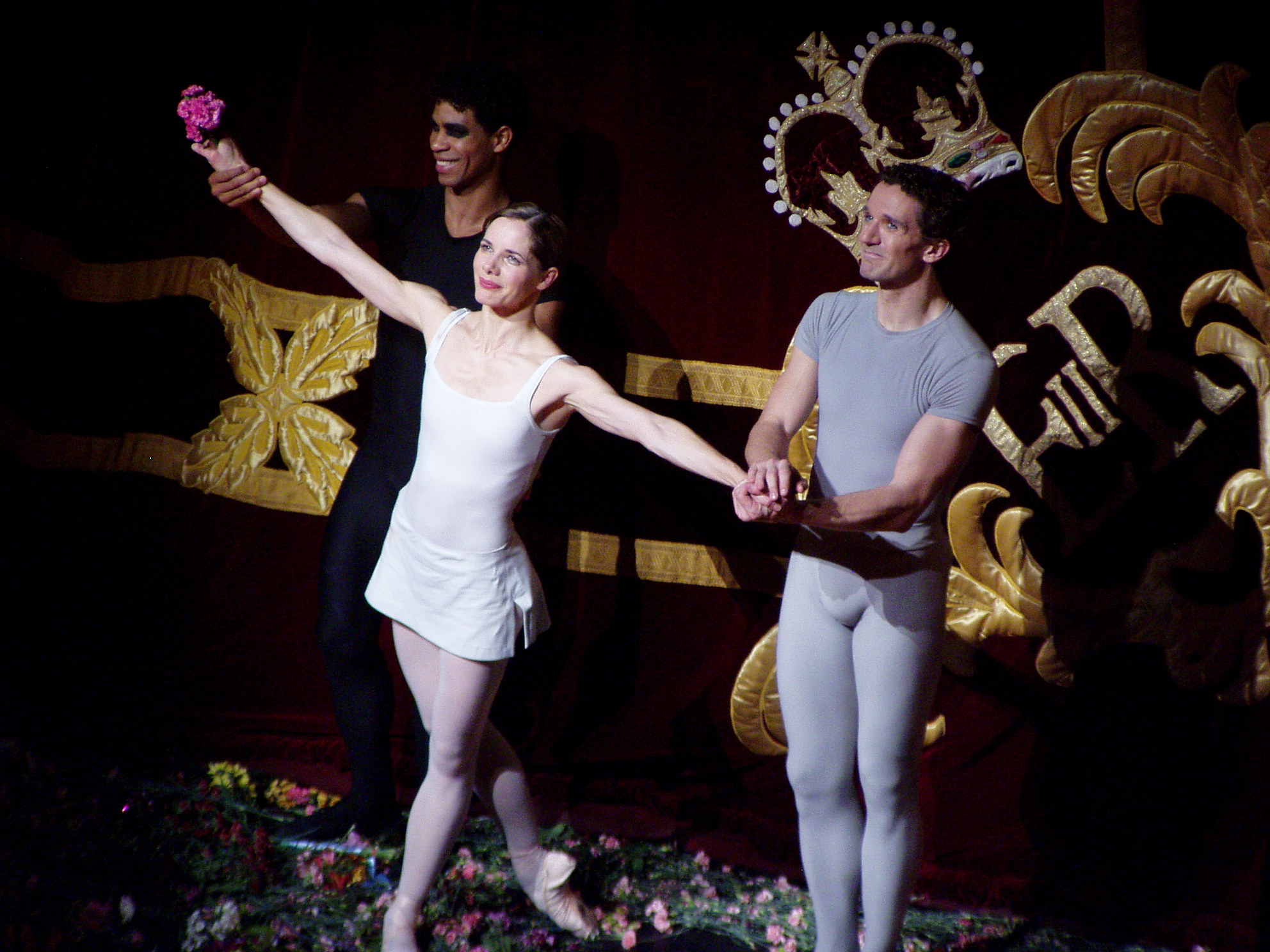
Darcey Bussell, Carlos Acosta and Gary Avis curtain call for Song of the Earth, 8 June 2007

In total, she performed more than 80 different roles and 17 roles were created for her. In Sleeping Beauty alone, she performed Aurora in four different productions, one of which was Sir Anthony Dowell's production which she opened at the Kennedy Center in Washington, D.C. in front of President Clinton. She made several guest appearances with the New York City Ballet, starting in June 1993, with a performance of the pas de deux from Agon.

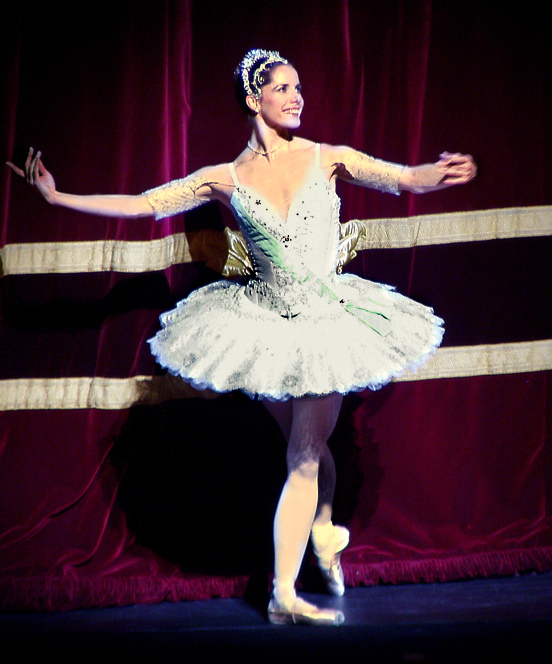
Darcey Bussell at a curtain call after a performance of Theme and Variations, 2007

She retired from ballet on 8 June 2007 with a performance of MacMillan's Song of the Earth (music Gustav Mahler: Das Lied von der Erde). It was performed at the Royal Opera House in London, and broadcast live on BBC Two. Bussell is widely regarded as one of the finest British ballerinas.

In 2012 Bussell was a member of the jury at the Prix de Lausanne ballet competition. Same year she participated in the 2012 Summer Olympics closing ceremony, leading a troupe of 200 ballerinas and 4 male dancers from the Royal Ballet. The performance was known as "the Spirit of the Flame" and preceded the official dousing of the Olympic flame.

Bussell performed the role of the mayor in the 2021 ballet film, Coppelia, a modern adaptation of the E.T.A. Hoffmann story combining live dance with animation.

Bussell was announced as the first female chair of the Board of Trustees of Plymouth Theatre Royal in March 2023. She served as a president of the jury at the Prix de Lausanne ballet competition in 2024.

== Other ventures ==
=== Writing ===
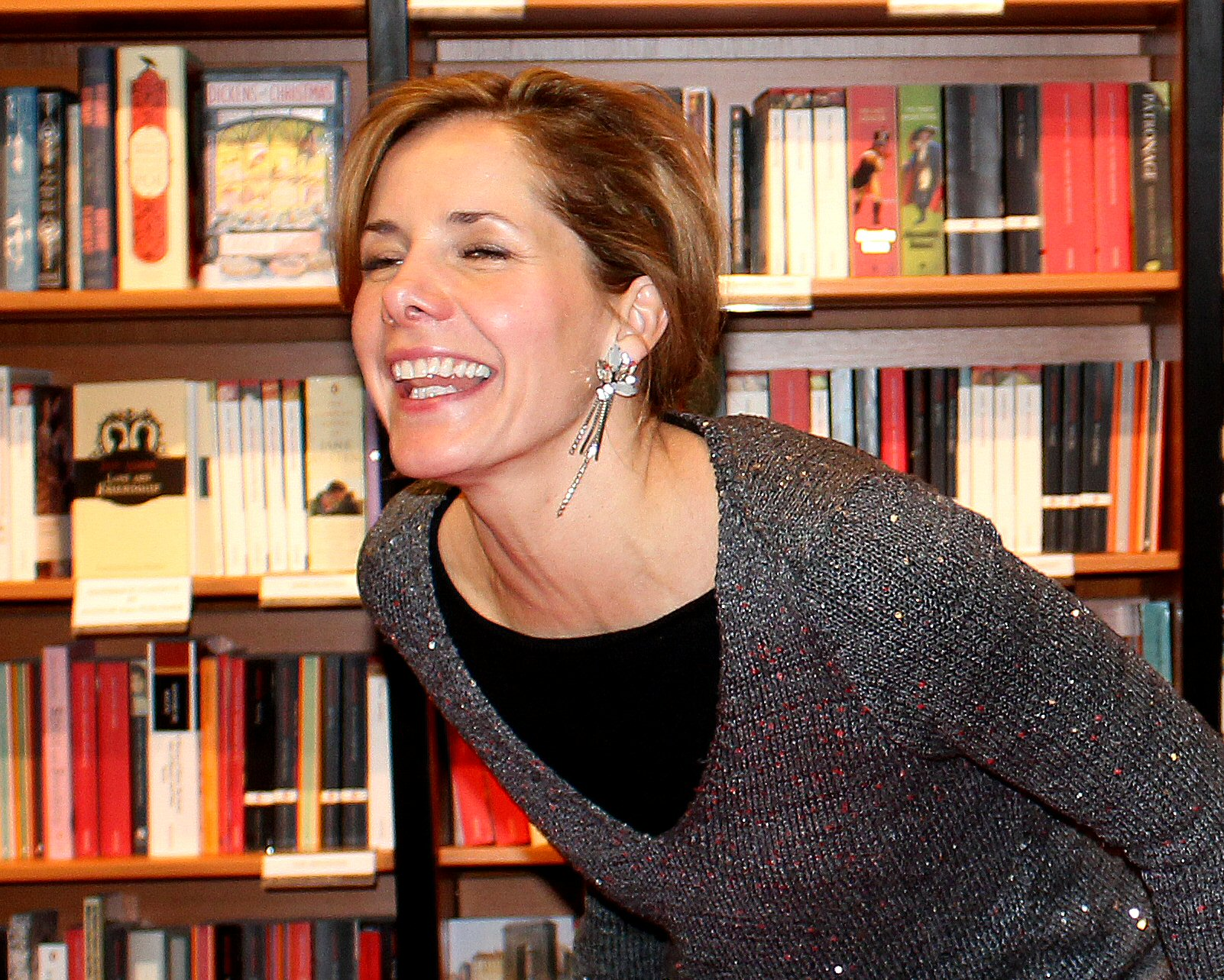
Bussell in a library in Chelsea, London in 2012

In October 2008 HarperCollins Children's Books released six short books in a new children's series called Magic Ballerina. Bussell had initiated the idea and storyline, and the books were written using a series of ghost writers. They feature a girl named Delphie who joins a ballet school and discovers her shoes are magical. Within three years at least 23 Magic Ballerina stories were published, all featuring girls who own magic sparkly red ballet shoes. At least the first two were illustrated by Katie May.

She co-wrote The Young Dancer with the Royal Ballet School and wrote an introduction to the book The Illustrated Book of Ballet by Barbara Newman, which showcases five of the ballets in which she starred. An autobiographical picture book of her ballet career, titled Darcey Bussell, was released in 2012. followed by Darcey Bussell: Evolved in 2018.

=== Television ===
A South Bank Show documentary on Bussell and her fellow principal Viviana Durante was broadcast in October 1992. In 1994 she played her first acting part, playing Olga Khokhlova opposite Brian Cox's Pablo Picasso in Yo Picasso. Bussell guest starred as herself in a 1993 episode of French and Saunders and the popular BBC1 comedy The Vicar of Dibley in 1998. In the episode, she aids Geraldine in a fundraiser and the two perform a pas de deux called "The Mirror".

In 2004 Bussell was the subject of a documentary titled Britain's Ballerina. Bussell teamed up with Katherine Jenkins to stage a song and dance production titled Viva la Diva, to pay tribute to the stars who inspired them, who include Madonna and Judy Garland. Bussell and Jenkins performed a segment of Viva la Diva before the Queen at the 79th Royal Variety Performance which was televised on 9 December 2007. Bussell joined the BBC's Strictly Come Dancing judging panel as a fifth judge in the final stages of the 2009 series. On the semi-final show of the competition she danced a jive with the professional dancer Ian Waite.

In December 2011 Bussell collaborated with choreographer Kim Gavin to make Darcey dances Hollywood, a BBC Two television documentary in which she recreated some of Hollywood's famous dance routines—including some by Gene Kelly and Fred Astaire & Ginger Rogers—from films such as Singin' In The Rain and Top Hat ("Cheek to Cheek").

In 2012 Bussell returned to the Strictly Come Dancing judging panel for the 2012 series as a permanent judge and replacement for Alesha Dixon.

On 12 August 2012 Bussell performed at the closing ceremony of the 2012 Summer Olympics, descending from the roof of the Olympic stadium as the 'Spirit of the Flame' and leading a troupe of 200 ballerinas.

In December 2013 Bussell presented a BBC Two documentary titled Darcey's Ballet Heroines. In December 2014 she presented a BBC One documentary on Audrey Hepburn, titled Darcey Bussell: Looking for Audrey. In May 2015, Bussell was co-presenter and dance expert for the Grand Final of the inaugural BBC Young Dancer competition, which was aired live on BBC Two.

In December 2015 Bussell presented an hour-long documentary on BBC Two, Darcey's Ballet Heroes, focussing on Vaslav Nijinsky, Rudolf Nureyev, and other male professionals ballet dancers. In December 2016, she presented a BBC One documentary on Margot Fonteyn, titled Darcey Bussell: Looking for Margot. In December 2017, she presented a BBC One documentary on Fred Astaire, titled Darcey Bussell: Looking for Fred. In December 2018, she presented a BBC Two documentary on the mental health benefits of dance, titled Darcey Bussell: Dancing to Happiness.

On 10 April 2019 Bussell announced that she had decided to step down as judge from Strictly Come Dancing. She said: "It has been a complete privilege for me to be part of Strictly, working with such a talented team. I have enjoyed every minute of my time and will miss everyone from my fellow judges, the presenters, the dancers, the musicians, the entire back stage team, and especially the viewers of the show, who have been so supportive."

Bussell presented Darcey Bussell's Wild Coasts of Scotland, a four-part travel series which aired on More4 from 8 February to 1 March 2021.

On 19 July 2022, the four-part series Darcey Bussell's Royal Roadtrip, presented by Bussell, premiered on More4.

== Honours and tributes ==
In 1994, a full-length portrait of her was unveiled by the artist Allen Jones RA, commissioned by The National Portrait Gallery, London.

Bussell was appointed Officer of the Order of the British Empire (OBE) in the 1995 New Year Honours for services to ballet, Commander of the Order of the British Empire (CBE) in the 2006 Birthday Honours, and Dame Commander of the Order of the British Empire (DBE) in the 2018 New Year Honours for services to dance.

In 2006, at the Chelsea Flower Show, David Austin Roses launched a new crimson rose called 'Darcey Bussell'.

In 2019, Megabus named one of its new fleet of coaches 'Darcey Bussell'.

Bussell is the "godmother" of MS Azura, a 115,000 ton cruise liner of the P&O Cruises fleet. When the ship was officially launched in April 2010, Bussell performed the traditional ceremony of breaking a bottle of champagne to name the ship. She also staged a dance performance with students from the Royal Ballet School.

In 2025, Bussell appeared on a British postage stamp issued as part of a special set by Royal Mail, which commemorated the series The Vicar of Dibley, Bussell having appeared as herself in an episode of the sitcom in 1998.

== Awards ==
In 2006 Bussell became a gold medal recipient from the John F. Kennedy Center for the Performing Arts. She is a recipient of the Carl Alan Award for contributions to dance.

In December 1990 she was voted Dancer of the Year by the readers of Dance and Dancers magazine. In February 1991 she was presented with the Variety Club of Great Britain's Sir James Garreras Award for the most promising newcomer of 1990 and one week later with the London Evening Standard Ballet Award for 1990. In April 1991 she was selected as the joint winner of the Cosmopolitan Achievement Award in the Performing Arts category.

On 18 July 2009 Bussell received an honorary doctorate from the University of Oxford. During the ceremony the university's public orator noted that she "adds to technical mastery, charm and imagination, in such a way that she seems to reveal the grace of her personality as well as the grace of movement… Moreover, she wants those who are perhaps put off by the grand portals of the Royal Opera House to enjoy the pleasures that ballet affords."

In 2017 Bussell received an honorary doctorate from the Royal Conservatoire in Glasgow, Scotland.

In June 2018 Bussell received an honorary Fellowship from Arts University Bournemouth alongside costume designer Jenny Beavan OBE, graphic designer Margaret Calvert OBE and director and screenwriter Edgar Wright. Bussell, had previously visited the university as a guest lecturer.

== Patronages ==
Since 2012, Bussell has been the president of the Royal Academy of Dance.

Bussell has been campaign president of the Birmingham Royal Ballet's fund raising campaign since 2012. She is an ambassador for the giving programme of the New Zealand School of Dance, and is on the board of the Margot Fonteyn Foundation. She is the international patron of the Sydney Dance Company.

She is a patron of the medical charities Borne, Sight for All and the Henry Spink Foundation.

== Personal life ==
In 1997 Bussell married Australian banker Angus Forbes, in Cherwell, Oxfordshire. Together, the couple has two daughters.

Originally, the couple lived in Kensington, moved to Sydney, Australia in 2008 and returned to London in July 2012. As of 2021, they live in Wimbledon.
