= National Ballet of Japan =

Japanese ballet company

National Ballet of Japan (NBJ)

General information
- Name: National Ballet of Japan (NBJ)
- Local name: 新国立劇場バレエ団
- Year founded: 1997
- Principal venue: New National Theatre, Tokyo
- Website: Official website

Artistic staff
- Artistic Director: Yoshida Miyako

Other
- Associated schools: New National Theatre Ballet School
- Formation: Principal; First Soloist; Soloist; First Artist; Artist

The National Ballet of Japan (新国立劇場バレエ団, Shin-Kokuritsu Gekijō Baree-dan), also known as the New National Theatre Ballet, Tokyo, is a Japanese ballet company founded in 1997 with the opening of the New National Theatre, Tokyo, where it is resident. Its repertoire ranges from the classical ballets of Tchaikovsky to contemporary works, choreographers represented including Frederick Ashton, George Balanchine, Kenneth MacMillan, Roland Petit, David Bintley, William Forsythe, and Christopher Wheeldon. As of 2025, the company has seventy-five full-time dancers.

== Premières ==
New ballets premiered by the company include:

- Bonshō no Koe—from The Tales of the Heike (1998), based on The Tale of the Heike, with music by Ishii Maki and choreography by Ishii Jun
- La Dame aux Camélias (2007), based on The Lady of the Camellias, with music by Berlioz and choreography by Maki Asami

== Overseas ==
The company's international debut was at the Kennedy Center in Washington in 2008, followed by first performances at the Bolshoi Theatre in Moscow in 2009 and at the Royal Opera House in London in 2025.

== Artistic Directors ==
- Shimada Hiroshi (1997–)
- Maki Asami (c. 2004–)
- David Bintley (2010/11–)
- Ōhara Noriko (2014–)
- Yoshida Miyako (2020–)

== Principals ==
- Fukuoka Yudai
- Hayami Shogo
- Izawa Shun
- Kimura Yuri
- Okumura Kosuke
- Ono Ayako
- Shibayama Saho
- Watanabe Takafumi
- Yonezawa Yui

== See also ==
- Kawamura Maki
- Tokyo Ballet
