= Song of the Earth (ballet) =

Ballet adaptations of a Mahler symphony

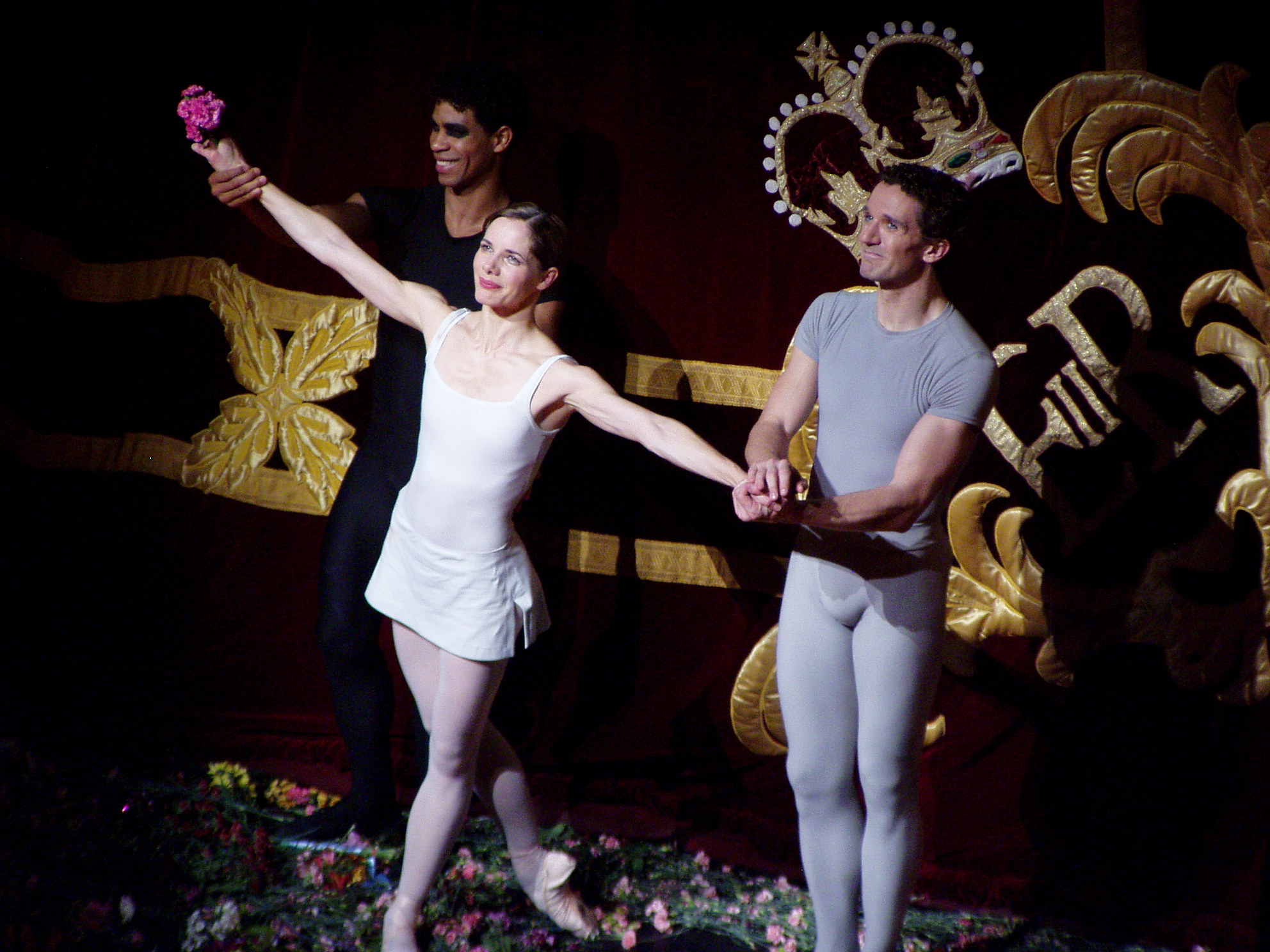
(Left to right) Carlos Acosta, Darcey Bussell and Gary Avis at the curtain call of MacMillan's Song of the Earth

The Song of the Earth is a ballet based on Das Lied von der Erde, a symphonic work written by the Austrian composer Gustav Mahler in 1908–1909. It is scored for two voices and orchestra, and has been used for ballets by several well-known choreographers, including Antony Tudor (1908–1987), Kenneth MacMillan (1929–1992), Heinz Spoerli (born 1940), and John Neumeier (born 1939).

== Tudor version ==
Song of the Earth
- Choreographer: Antony Tudor
- Premiere: 14 April 1948; Metropolitan Opera House
- Original ballet company: American Ballet Theatre
- Design: Jo Mielziner

As staff choreographer with Ballet Theatre (later American Ballet Theatre), Antony Tudor began creating a ballet set to Mahler's Das Lied von der Erde. The six songs based on ancient Chinese poems, expressing the transience of human existence, had long interested him as a choreographic possibility. He explained their appeal: "Like the seasons, human experience is cyclical and has no sudden beginning or end." His ballet, entitled Shadow of the Wind, had its premiere on 14 April 1948 at the Metropolitan Opera House in New York. Scenery, costumes, and lighting were designed by Jo Mielziner. The dancers were Igor Youskevitch, Hugh Laing, and Dimitri Romanoff (in "Six Idlers of the Bamboo Valley," set to song I); Alicia Alonso, John Kriza, and Mary Burr (in "The Abandoned Wife," set to song II); Ruth Ann Koesun and Crandall Diehl (in "My Lord Summons Me," set to song III); Diana Adams and Zachary Solov (in "The Lotus Gatherers," set to song IV); Hugh Laing (in "Conversation with Winepot and Bird," set to song V); and Nana Goldner, Hugh Laing, and Dimitri Romanoff (in "Poem for the Guitar," set to song VI). Photographs of the cast by Carl Van Vechten show elaborate costumes of flowing draperies in pseudo-Chinese style and the dancers in supposedly Oriental attitudes.

The ballet was not a success, receiving scarcely a positive word in the press. John Martin, writing in the New York Times, damned it with faint praise. "To this combination of ancient Chinese classic hedonism already screened through a process of Germanic Weltschmerz, Tudor has deliberately added the academic formation of the traditional ballet. The work had only three performances, the last of which played to a house that had dropped to 24 percent capacity.

== MacMillan version ==
Song of the Earth
- Native title: Das Lied von der Erde
- Choreographer: Kenneth MacMillan
- Premiere: 7 November 1965; Staatstheater Stuttgart
- Original ballet company: Stuttgart Ballet
- Design: Nicholas Georgiadis

In 1959, Kenneth MacMillan asked the directors of the Royal Opera House in London if he might use Mahler's Das Lied von der Erde in a new commission for the Royal Ballet. He was refused because it was thought that such a major musical work was not suitable accompaniment for ballet. In 1965, however, MacMillan offered the idea to his friend John Cranko, director of the Stuttgart Ballet, who promptly accepted it. MacMillan summarized the scenario of his work in these words: "A man and a woman; death takes the man; they both return to her, and at the end of the ballet we find that in death there is the promise of renewal." With Marcia Haydée as Die Frau, Ray Barra as Der Mann, and Egon Madsen as Der Ewig (The Eternal One), it had its first performance on 7 November 1965 at the Württembergische Staatstheater in Stuttgart. Margarethe Bence, mezzo-soprano, and James Harper, tenor, sang the six "songs of the Earth." In MacMillan's choreography, the young woman is a figure of loneliness, isolated from the movements of her friends, and the man, like others in his group, is blissfully unaware of his mortality. The Eternal One is not a figure of evil but a gentle, ever-present companion to all in the ensemble.

The ballet was an instant success, widely admired by German audiences and critics alike. The Royal Ballet took the piece into its repertory only six months after its Stuttgart premiere. Presented under its English title, Song of the Earth, in May 1966 at the Royal Opera House in London, it starred guest artist Marcia Haydée as The Woman, Donald MacLeary as The Man, and Anthony Dowell as The Messenger of Death. Nicholas Georgiadis adapted his original costume designs for the Covent Garden production. The choreography is described as "earthbound, non-classical movements that morph seamlessly into modernist curves in a work of breathtaking beauty and power."

In 2007, the ballet was broadcast live on BBC Two, as Darcey Bussell's farewell performance, with The Man and The Messenger of Death danced by Gary Avis and Carlos Acosta respectively. In 2017, on the 25th anniversary of MacMillan's death, five ballet companies across the UK presented a mixed bill titled Kenneth MacMillan: a National Celebration at the Royal Opera House. Song of the Earth was performed by English National Ballet, with Erina Takahashi as The Woman, Isaac Hernández as The Man and Jeffrey Cirio (a guest principal) as The Messenger of Death. In 2020, the English National Ballet released video of Song of the Earth online in response to the impact of the COVID-19 coronavirus pandemic on the performing arts. This performance was filmed in 2017 at Palace Theatre, Manchester, intended for internal archival, with Tamara Rojo as the Woman, Joseph Caley as The Man and Cirio as The Messenger of Death.

== Spoerli version ==
Song of the Earth
- Native title: Das Lied von der Erde
- Choreographer: Heinz Spoerli
- Premiere: Zurich Opera House
- Original ballet company: Zurich Ballet
- Design: Florian Etti; Claudia Binder

Swiss choreographer Heinz Spoerli created his version of Das Lied von der Erde in 2011, as he was nearing retirement at the end of his long tenure as director of the Zurich Ballet. It was a fitting choice for him, as the last of the six songs ends with the words ewig, ewig, ewig ("always, always, always"), sounding, as one critic wrote, "like the never-ending echo of farewells in the night." It is a melancholy reminiscence of life's journey from the morning of youthful exuberance to the sunset of declining days and the gathering twilight. In his choreography, Spoerli associates the six musical episodes with the protagonists conjured up by Mahler's music and the Chinese poems, entitled in their English translations as "The Drinking Song of Earth's Sorrow," "The Solitary One in Autumn," "Youth," "Beauty," "The Drunkard in Spring," and "The Farewell."

With scenery designed by Florian Etti and costumes by Claudia Binder, Spoerli's ballet had its first performance on 2 April 2011 at the Opernhaus Zürich. The original cast of six soloists included Vahe Martirosyan (The Man), Karine Seneca (Eternity), Filipe Portugal (Death), Arman Grigoryan (The Divided), Galina Mihaylova (The Girl), and Sarah-Jane Brodbeck (The Beauty). Spoerli did not attempt to illustrate the text of the poems, as MacMillan had done in his 1965 version. Instead, he took his choreographic clues from words, phrases, and moods of the text and created meditative dances for each song. "The result is a hauntingly beautiful succession of scenes, big and small ensembles, but hardly any solos, based on the contemporary classic vocabulary."

== Neumeier version ==
Song of the Earth
- Native title: Le Chant de la Terre
- Choreographer: John Neumeier
- Premiere: 24 February 2015; Palais Garnier
- Original ballet company: Paris Opera Ballet
- Design: John Neumeier

In 2015, at the age of 72, choreographer John Neumeier continued his career-long fascination with making dances to the music of Gustav Mahler. His ballet set to Das Lied von der Erde was made for the Paris Opera Ballet. With sets, costumes, and lighting designed by the choreographer himself, it had its first performance on 24 February 2015 at the Palais Garnier, the company's home theater. The conductor was Patrick Lange, and the singers were Burkhard Fritz, tenor, and Paul Armin Edelmann, baritone. Under the French title Le Chant de la Terre, it was danced by "les étoiles, les premiers danseurs, et corps de ballet" of the company. As in MacMillan's version, a woman and two men lead the cast, but the action follows the two men rather than the woman. Mathieu Ganio was a strong, melancholy presence as Le Homme; Karl Paquette was his shadowy double; and Laetitia Pujol portrayed La Femme. The work did not meet with unqualified success. The choreography was criticized for being overliteral in its interpretation of songs inspired by the ancient Chinese poems, and the dancers were faulted for technical inadequacies. Only Ganio and Pujol won praise for their moving performance of "Der Abschied," the final song.
