= K-ballet =

Ballet company in Japan

K-Ballet

General information
- Name: K-Ballet
- Local name: K-バレエカンパニー
- Year founded: 1999
- Founders: Tetsuya Kumakawa William Trevitt Michael Nunn
- Website: http://k-ballet.co.jp

Artistic staff
- Artistic Director: Tetsuya Kumakawa
- Deputy Director: Stuart Cassidy
- Ballet Mistress: Shiori Asakawa, Ran Yamada
- Ballet Master: Hayato Nishino, Rei Sakoh

Other
- Orchestra: Theatre Orchestra of Tokyo
- Official school: K-Ballet School

K-ballet is a Japanese ballet company. The company started in 1999, and has since held approximately 50 annual performances.

K-Ballet's activity was first recognised internationally in July 2004, when the ballet group was invited to New York's Metropolitan Opera House with The Royal Ballet, one of the World's leading ballet companies. The honorary president is currently renowned ballet dancer, Sir Anthony Dowell.

== Company members ==
There are currently almost 70 dancers and artists involved in K-Ballet's productions. The most notable include Artistic Director Tetsuya Kumakawa, Principal Dancer Shohei Horiuchi, and Principal Soloist Dancer Mina Kobayashi (as of June 2022).

=== Principals ===
- Shiori Asakawa
- Nozomi Iijima
- Shoya Ishibashi
- Sena Hidaka
- Shohei Horiuchi
- Masaya Yamamoto

=== Principal soloists ===
- Mina Kobayashi
- Kei Sugino
- Saya Narita

=== First soloists ===
- Mayuka Asano
- Yuka Iwai
- Ren kuriyama
- Kaito Sekino
- Risako Toda
- shuhei Yoshida
- Gregoire Lansier

=== Soloists ===
- Yoshitomo Okuda
- Shu Kurihara
- Miho Saeki
- Rei Takahashi
- Kumiko Tsuzi
- Shohei Honda
- Natsuki Yamada
- Saori Yoshida
