= Nehemiah Kish =

American retired ballet dancer

- Born: Caro, Michigan, U.S.
- Education: National Ballet of Canada School; Goldsmiths, University of London (MA)
- Occupation: Ballet dancer
- Title: Principal dancer, the Royal Ballet
- Term: 2004–2019
- Spouse: Yuhui Choe (m. 2018)
- Children: 1

Nehemiah Kish is an American retired ballet dancer. He was a principal dancer of the Royal Ballet in London.

== Early life ==
Kish was born in Caro, Michigan.

== Career ==
Kish first trained in gymnastics and jazz dance, before changing to ballet. He joined the National Ballet of Canada School aged 13 and graduated into the company in 2001, being promoted to principal in 2005. In 2008, Kish joined the Royal Danish Ballet as a principal dancer. In 2010, he joined the Royal Ballet, also as a principal. He retired from the company in 2019.

== Personal life ==
In 2018, Kish married Yuhui Choe, also a Royal Ballet dancer. They have a daughter (born January 2021). After retiring from ballet, Kish completed a Master of Arts in Arts Administration and Cultural Policy at Goldsmiths, University of London in 2021.
