= O'Hara (surname) =

O'Hara (Irish: Ó hEaghra) is a surname. The death of the eponym – Eaghra Poprigh mac Saorghus, lord of Luighne, in Connaught – is mentioned in the Annals of the Four Masters in 926. According to historian C. Thomas Cairney, the O'Haras were one of the chiefly families of the "race of Luighne" or "Lugh" who came from the tribe of Cianacht who in turn were from the Dumnonii or Laigin who were the third wave of Celts to settle in Ireland during the first century BC.

Notable people with the surname include:

- Aidan O'Hara (born 1964), Irish diplomat
- Sr. Ann Margaret O'Hara, SP (born 1937), American former Superior General of the Sisters of Providence of Saint Mary-of-the-Woods
- Annie O'Hara (1869–1897), Australian physician
- Barratt O'Hara (1882–1969), American politician
- Catherine O'Hara (1954–2026), Canadian and American actress
- Charles O'Hara (1740–1802), British military officer
- Charles O'Hara (politician) (1746–1822), Irish landowner and politician
- Charles O'Hara, 1st Baron Tyrawley (1650–1724), Irish soldier
- Cole O'Hara (born 2002), Canadian ice hockey player
- Dane O'Hara, New Zealand rugby league footballer
- David O'Hara (born 1965), British actor
- Dorothea Warren O'Hara (1873–1972), American ceramic artist
- Eddie O'Hara (politician) (1937–2016), British politician
- Edwin Vincent O'Hara (1881–1956), American prelate of the Roman Catholic Church
- Éilis Ni Dhuibhne (Elisabeth O'Hara; born 1954), Irish novelist
- Elizabeth O'Hara (medical doctor) (1866–1942), Australian physician
- Eva O'Hara, British actress
- Francis or Frank O'Hara, several people
- Gerald Patrick Aloysius O'Hara (1895–1963), American prelate of the Roman Catholic Church
- Geoffrey O'Hara (1882–1967), Canadian American composer, singer and music professor
- George O'Hara (actor) (1899–1966), American actor and screenwriter
- Gerry O'Hara (1924–2023), British film and television director
- Glen O'Hara (born 1974), British academic historian
- Harry Fusao O'Hara (1891–1951), Japanese WWI pilot, first and only known Japanese pilot in the British Royal Flying Corps
- Helen O'Hara (born 1955), British musician, violinist
- James O'Hara, several people
- Jamie O'Hara (footballer) (born 1986), British football player
- Jean O'Hara (1913–1973), American prostitute
- Joan O'Hara (1930–2007), Irish actress
- John O'Hara, several people
- Joseph O'Hara, several people
- Justice O'Hara, several people
- Kane O'Hara (c.1711–1782), Irish composer
- Kelley O'Hara (born 1988), American footballer
- Kelli O'Hara (born 1977), American actress and singer
- Kid O'Hara (1875–1954), American baseball player
- Loral O'Hara (born 1983), American engineer and NASA astronaut
- Maggie Blue O'Hara (born 1975), Canadian actress
- Mario O'Hara (1946–2012), Filipino film director, film producer and screenwriter
- Mark O'Hara (born 1995), Scottish footballer
- Mary O'Hara, several people
- Maureen O'Hara (1920–2015), Irish-American actress
- Michael O'Hara, several people
- Paige O'Hara (born 1956), American singer and actress
- Patsy O'Hara (1957–1981), Irish Republican hunger striker
- Patrick O'Hara, several people
- Quinn O'Hara (1941–2017), Scottish-born American actress
- Sally Brice-O'Hara (born 1953), American 27th Vice-Commandant of the U.S. Coast Guard
- Shaun O'Hara (born 1977), American football player
- Theodore O'Hara (1820–1867), American poet and Confederate colonel
- Thomas O'Hara, several people
- Tom O'Hara, several people
- Valentine O'Hara (1875–1941), Irish author and authority on Russia
- Colonel Walter O'Hara (1789–1874), British army officer

== Other individuals who use the name O'Hara ==
- Asia O'Hara (born 1982), American drag queen
- Eureka O'Hara (born 1990), American drag queen
- Robert O'Hara Burke (1820–1861), Irish soldier, policeman and explorer
- Pat O'Hara Wood (1891–1961), Australian tennis player
- Phi Phi O'Hara (born 1985), American drag queen
- Julia O'Hara Stiles (born 1981), American actress

== Fictional characters ==
- Chief O'Hara (Disney Comics), Disney comic book character
- Chief Miles O'Hara, character from the Batman TV show
- Jack "Butcher" O'Hara, the Green Beret in the game series Commandos
- O'Hara, a major villainous underling from Bruce Lee film Enter the Dragon, played by Karateka Robert Wall
- Juliet O'Hara, a main character in the American comedy-drama television series Psych
- Kimball O'Hara, protagonist of Rudyard Kipling's novel Kim
- Miguel O'Hara is an alternative futuristic version of the comic book superhero Spider-Man
- Neely O'Hara, character in Valley of the Dolls
- Scarlett O'Hara, literary protagonist in Margaret Mitchell's novel Gone with the Wind
- Scarlett (G.I. Joe), a female character whose actual name is Shana O'Hara
- Dr Eleanor O'Hara, a female main character from American medical comedy-drama TV series Nurse Jackie, referred to mostly as just O'Hara
- Spike O'Hara, the main character in the NES game Ghoul School
- Moira O'Hara, a female side character in American Horror Story: Murder House

== See also ==
- O'Hara (disambiguation)
- O'Hare
- Irish clans
