= Gulf Stream, Florida =

Town in the state of Florida, United States

- Town
- Town of Gulf Stream
- Seal

- Location of Gulf Stream, Florida
- Coordinates: 26°29′42″N 80°03′21″W
- Country: United States
- State: Florida
- County: Palm Beach
- Founded (Phipps Beach): c. 1916-Early 1920s
- Incorporated (Town of Gulf Stream): 1925
- Named for: Gulf Stream

Government
  - Type: Commissioner-Manager
  - Mayor: Scott W. Morgan (R)
  - Vice Mayor: Thomas M. Stanley
  - Commissioners: Joan K. Orthwein, Michael Greene, and Robert Canfield
  - Town Manager: Edward C. "Trey" Nazzaro
  - Town Clerk: Reneé R. Basel

Area
  - Total: 0.90 sq mi (2.32 km^{2})
  - Land: 0.78 sq mi (2.03 km^{2})
  - Water: 0.11 sq mi (0.29 km^{2})
- Elevation: 0 ft (0 m)

Population (2020)
  - Total: 954
  - Density: 1,215.3/sq mi (469.23/km^{2})
- Time zone: UTC-5 (Eastern (EST))
  - Summer (DST): UTC-4 (EDT)
- ZIP code: 33483
- Area codes: 561, 728
- FIPS code: 12-28275
- GNIS feature ID: 2406627
- Website: www.gulf-stream.org

Gulf Stream is a town in Palm Beach County, Florida, United States. The population of the town was at 954 as of the 2020 US Census.

== History ==
Gulf Stream was founded around 1916, and throughout the early 1920s, the planned community centered around the Gulf Stream County Club. The name of the town comes from its location on the Gulf Stream, a warm Atlantic Ocean current. Bessemer Properties, a real estate business venture controlled by the family of Henry Phipps, Jr., was responsible for creating the community that was briefly named after him, Phipps Beach, before it was ultimately renamed the Town of Gulf Stream when it was officially incorporated as a municipality in 1925.

== Geography ==
According to the United States Census Bureau, the town has a total area of 0.9 square miles (2.3 km^{2}), of which 0.8 square miles (2.1 km^{2}) is land and 0.1 square miles (0.26 km^{2}) (9.64%) is water.

=== Climate ===
The Town of Gulf Stream has a tropical climate, similar to the climate found in much of the Caribbean. It is part of the only region in the 48 contiguous states that falls under that category. More specifically, it generally has a tropical savanna climate (Köppen climate classification: Aw), bordering a tropical monsoon climate (Köppen climate classification: Am).

== Demographics ==
Historical population
Census	Pop.	Note	%±
1940	93		—
1950	163		75.3%
1960	176		8.0%
1970	408		131.8%
1980	475		16.4%
1990	690		45.3%
2000	716		3.8%
2010	786		9.8%
2020	954		21.4%
U.S. Decennial Census

=== 2010 and 2020 census ===
Gulf Stream racial composition (Hispanics excluded from racial categories) (NH = Non-Hispanic)
Race	Pop 2010	Pop 2020	% 2010	% 2020
White (NH)	740	889	94.15%	93.19%
Black or African American (NH)	2	1	0.25%	0.10%
Native American or Alaska Native (NH)	0	1	0.00%	0.10%
Asian (NH)	5	8	0.64%	0.84%
Pacific Islander or Native Hawaiian (NH)	0	1	0.00%	0.10%
Some other race (NH)	4	1	0.51%	0.10%
Two or more races/Multiracial (NH)	1	3	0.13%	0.31%
Hispanic or Latino (any race)	34	50	4.33%	5.24%
Total	786	954		

As of the 2020 United States census, there were 954 people, 386 households, and 270 families residing in the town.

As of the 2010 United States census, there were 786 people, 332 households, and 234 families residing in the town.

=== 2000 census ===
As of the census of 2000, there were 716 people, 340 households, and 222 families residing in the town. The population density was 953.7 inhabitants per square mile (368.2/km^{2}). There were 625 housing units at an average density of 832.5 per square mile (321.4/km^{2}). The racial makeup of the town was 95.39% White (93.2% were Non-Hispanic White), 0.98% African American, 0.14% Native American, 1.40% Asian, 1.12% from other races, and 0.98% from two or more races. Hispanic or Latino of any race were 2.93% of the population.

In 2000, there were 340 households, out of which 16.2% had children under the age of 18 living with them, 60.6% were married couples living together, 1.8% had a female householder with no husband present, and 34.7% were non-families. 28.8% of all households were made up of individuals, and 18.2% had someone living alone who was 65 years of age or older. The average household size was 2.11 and the average family size was 2.55.

In 2000, in the town, the population was spread out, with 14.9% under the age of 18, 1.7% from 18 to 24, 15.6% from 25 to 44, 29.7% from 45 to 64, and 38.0% who were 65 years of age or older. The median age was 56 years. For every 100 females, there were 93.5 males. For every 100 females age 18 and over, there were 89.1 males.

In 2000, the median income for a household in the town was $146,985, and the median income for a family was $186,777. Males had a median income of $78,045 versus $40,625 for females. The per capita income for the town was $133,651. About 2.5% of families and 2.5% of the population were below the poverty line, none under age 18 and just 1.7% of those age 65 or over.

As of 2000, English spoken as a first language accounted for 97.54% of all residents, while the mother tongue of Spanish made up 2.45% of the population.

== Education ==
Gulf Stream School, a private co-educational school located in Gulf Stream, was founded in 1938. The school serves students from pre-K through eighth grade.

== Notable people ==
- Kevin Anderson, professional tennis player
- Andrew N. "Drew" Baur, co-ownerof the St. Louis Cardinals
- Robert Craft, conductor and musicologist
- Tomas Maier, fashion designer and creative director of Bottega Veneta
- Christopher O'Hare, artist and sculptor
