= Ohara =

Ohara or Ōhara may refer to:

== Places ==
- Ōhara, Chiba
- Ōhara, Okayama
- Ohara District, Shimane

== Companies and organisations ==
- Ohara Corporation, a manufacturer of precision optical glass
- Ohara-ryū, a school of ikebana
- Ohara Museum of Art

== Other uses ==
- Ohara (surname), two separate Japanese surnames
- Ohara (TV series), U.S. TV series
- Ohara, from the anime/manga One Piece, an island in the “West Blue” hemisphere which was blown up by the World Government for trying to uncover the true history of the world. Nico Robin hails from this island.

== See also ==
- O'Hara (disambiguation)
