= Fusao =

- Gender: Male

Origin
- Origin: Japanese
- Meaning: Different meanings depending on the kanji used

Fusao (written: 房朗 or 房雄) is a masculine Japanese given name. Notable people with the name include:

- Fusao Hayashi (林 房雄; 1903–1975), pen name of Toshio Gotō, Japanese writer
- Fusao Sekiguchi (関口 房朗; born 1935), Japanese businessman and racehorse owner
- Lawson Fusao Inada (born 1938), Japanese American poet
- Harry Fusao O'Hara (1891–1951), Japanese military aviator
