= Animal Stories =

- Created by: Trevor Ricketts
- Directed by: Tony Collingwood
- Narrated by: Nigel Hawthorne (UK); Alan Marriott (US)
- Country of origin: United Kingdom
- Original language: English
- No. of seasons: 4
- No. of episodes: 52

Production
- Producer: Christopher O'Hare
- Running time: 5 minutes
- Production companies: Collingwood O'Hare Entertainment Ltd.; Suzhou Hong Ying Animation Company Limited

Original release
- Network: ITV (CITV)
- Release: 22 May 1998 – 13 December 2001

Animal Stories is a British pre-school animated television series on ITV (CITV). It also aired on Disney Channel's Playhouse Disney block in the United States from 1998 to 2001 and on Disney Channel in the rest of Asia. The series gained a 2001 Children's BAFTA for Best Pre-school Animation.

== Plot ==
Every episode of the series focuses on a different individual animal, who is unique in personality. The entire episode rhymes.

== Episodes ==
=== Season 1 (1998) ===
#	Title	Short Summary	Air Date
1	Big Pink Pig	The Pig tries to work out hard, then he learns to be true to his character.	
2	Trevor the Frog	Trevor is overwhelmed by his wife Milly's tadpoles, then gets used to it.	
3	Helen the Penguin	Helen is obsessed with trying to fly and on her birthday, her wish is granted.	
4	Smelly Dog	The Smelly Dog is kept out of the way due to his stinky breath, until he prevents a bank robbery.	
5	Big Bold Lion	The Old Lion is the laughing stock due to his baldness.	
6	Hugh the Worm	Hugh who is secretly a worm has a whirlwind romance with Joyce.	
7	Edwina the Aardvark	Edwina is unhappy about her appearance, until she meets the doctor.	
8	Simpson the Slug	Squeaky the Mouse helps Simpson with his slow problem, which changes his life.	
9	Win-Stanley the Sloth	Win-Stanley has a long journey without even making a move.	
10	Polar Bear	Little Polar Bear does not like the cold and wants to make a journey.	
11	Billy the Giraffe	Billy is proud and snooty about his tallness, until he gets a sore throat.	
12	Ron the Crab	Ron's friends try to teach him how to walk sideways like other crabs.	
13	Crocodile Lou	Lou's smile scares away everyone. That is except Jake Snake.	

=== Season 2 (1999) ===
#	Title	Short Summary	Air Date
1	Bobby the Ape	Bobby's gardening embarrasses the other apes, but not Queen Bridget.	
2	Ant 2954	2954 wants to be recognised by other ants and is renamed Differ.	
3	Tommy the Bat	Tommy has insomnia until he realises he must hang upside-down.	
4	Tony the Tortoise	Tony removes his shell to run fast, but nobody recognises him.	
5	Susie the Kangaroo	Susie has trouble controlling her hopping tendencies.	
6	Camilla the Camel	Camilla isn't confident to attend a dance ball until she rescues an important host.	
7	Oliver the Owl	Oliver has a fight against Reggie the Rooster over their different sleeping patterns.	
8	Dinky the Dolphin	Dinky experiences freedom in the sea after escaping the aquarium.	
9	Clive the Hamster	A selfish Clive greedily steals birthday presents that were meant for him.	
10	Fred the Dragon	Fred tries hard to breathe fire to prove he really is a dragon.	
11	Bruce the Goose	Bruce develops hiccup problems and his flock has a hard time trying to cure it.	
12	Eric the Elephant	Eric is timid and shy at school, but gets confident during a fire rescue.	
13	Jake the Snake	Jake gets in a balloon to be noticed, which works after mishap.	

=== Season 3 (2000) ===
#	Title	Short Summary	Air Date
1	Brian the Leopard	Brian is teased for the spots on his fur and he wants a new makeover.	
2	Pointy the Hedgehog	Pointy's spines are becoming an obstacle for him.	
3	Peter the Peacock	Peter is proud of his feathers, but when they fall off, the peahen helps him.	
4	Lewis the Cat	A picky Lewis has to try new foods when his regular café is closed.	
5	Horatio the Rat	Despite his nice nature, Horatio is ostracised until he rescues a baby bird.	
6	Cyril the Centipede	Cyril feels down, when he thinks he's missing his 100th leg.	
7	Jimmy the Mouse	Alistair Sparkle makes Jimmy a singing star. But being a star makes Jimmy homesick.	
8	Bob the Bee	Bob complains too much. When he gets lonesome, he changes his ways when Billy comes to his rescue.	
9	Keith the Caterpillar	Keith is unhappy he cannot fly to impress Denise, until he turns into a butterfly.	
10	Maurice the Magpie	Maurice has to deal with his huge rubbish collection, which bothers his wife Doris.	
11	Eddie the Catfish	Bored of his surroundings, Eddie foolishly ventures near land and has a lucky escape.	
12	Sammy the Hippo	Sammy likes to get muddy, much to his mother's dismay, until she receives a jar of beauty mud.	
13	Ernest the Hyena	A serious Ernest doesn't laugh like other hyenas, until King Car-stairs slips on a banana peel.	

=== Season 4 (2001) ===
#	Title	Short Summary	Air Date
1	Ralph the Rabbit	Ralph leaves to get away from his overcrowding family. However they rescue him from a hungry fox.	
2	Austin the Oyster	Austin is mocked for his small pearl, but the Seahorse Princess shows everyone that it is special.	
3	Philip the Fly	Flies think that Philip's learning is useless, but it saves him from a hungry spider.	
4	Felicia the Hummingbird	Felicia hurries to do her daily routines until a snail teaches her the benefit of patience.	
5	Drew the Whale	Drew is too big and can't fit into the disco club. When the disco club is destroyed, Drew has just the club for all the fish.	
6	Clara the Cow	Clara and the hen Gwen become business rivals with dairy and egg sales. Together they start a pancake making business.	
7	Charlie the Cheetah	Charlie is quite a show off with his fast speed. Linford the snail beats him in a race and shows him that friends are more important.	
8	Dinosaur Tim	Tim (a Pterodactyl) and Bill (a Brontosaurus) are dinosaurs hatched in the wrong nests, but when they both meet, their families live together, side by side.	
9	Des the Donkey	Des tells tall tales to his barnyard friends. When they find out they aren't true, they remain friends.	
10	Ross the Rhinoceros	Ross is a very cross rhino. Only when his toothache is gone, does he become much nicer.	
11	Carla the Koala	Carla is overwhelmed with jobs for elderly koalas. To solve this, Carla has a platypus sew her a backpack.	
12	Melvin the Moose	Melvin is a fussy eater and swipes his classmates' food. Tricking Melvin into eating his own food cures his greed.	
13	Dodo the Pigeon	Dodo is teased at school for his name. This changes when he tells the class the origin of his name.	

== DVD release ==
Mill Creek Entertainment released Animal Stories- The Complete Series on DVD in Region 1 on 18 May 2010.
