= Patrick O'Hara (disambiguation) =

Patrick O'Hara was an Irish politician.

Patrick O'Hara or Pat O'Hara may also refer to:

- Pat O'Hara (born 1968), American football coach and former player
- Pat O'Hara (rugby union) (born 1961), retired Irish rugby union player
- Patrick O'Hara (artist) (born 1936)

== See also ==
- Patsy O'Hara (1957–1981), Irish republican hunger striker and member of the Irish National Liberation Army
