= O'Hair =

O'Hair is a surname. Notable people with the surname include:

- Frank T. O'Hair, U.S. Representative from Illinois
- Madalyn Murray O'Hair, American atheist and activist
- Sean O'Hair, American golfer

== See also ==
- O'Hare (disambiguation)
- O'Hare (surname)
