= Francis O'Hara (disambiguation) =

Francis O'Hara (1883–1915) was a Scottish football centre forward.

Francis or Frank O'Hara may also refer to:

- Frank O'Hara (footballer) (1872–1944), Australian footballer
- Frank O'Hara (1926–1966), American writer, poet, and art critic

== See also ==
- Frances O'Hara, wife of Charles O'Hara, 1st Baron Tyrawley
