= Michael O'Hara =

Michael O'Hara may refer to:

== Athletes ==
- Michael O'Hara (athlete) (born 1996), Jamaican sprinter
- Michael O'Hara (volleyball) (1932–2018), American Olympic volleyball player

== Writers ==
- Mike O'Hara (reporter), (born 1946) American reporter
- Michael O'Hara (writer), American screenwriter

== Other ==
- Michael D. O'Hara (1910–1978), American jurist
- Michael John O'Hara, (1933—2014) British geologist
- Michael M. O'Hara (born 1959), American educator, author, and historian of theatre
