= Mary O'Hara (disambiguation) =

Mary O'Hara (born 1935) is an Irish musician.

Mary O'Hara may also refer to:

- Mary O'Hara (author) (1885–1980), American author and screenwriter
- Mary O'Hara (journalist), Irish journalist, writer, and anti-poverty activist
- Mary O'Hara (TV series), an Australian television series featuring the musician
- Mary Margaret O'Hara (born late 1950s), Canadian singer-songwriter, actress, and composer
