= O'Hare (surname) =

Irish surname

O'Hare is the anglicised form of the Irish name Ó hÍr (meaning "long-lasting"), or derived from Ó hAichir (meaning "fierce" or "sharp"). It is an Irish clan (or sept) surname.

The earliest reference to the clan Ó Haichir (now O'Hare) is to be found in the Annals of the Four Masters. The great majority of O'Hares, were descendants of the Oriel family of Ohir or Oheir, who were kin to the O'Hanlons and seated in the Barony of Orier, County Armagh in Ireland, where, with the adjacent counties of Antrim and County Down, the O'Hares are still found.

The O'Hare name was spelled: O'Heir, O'Hire, O'Heere, O'Hear, O'Hare and O'Haire. It is the name of an Oriel family who were chiefs of Oirtheara, now the baronies of Orier, in the east of County Armagh. According to the traditional Irish pedigree, the family is descended from Slioch Ir, who was the son of Ior and the grandson of Cathal Ruadh, who was killed in 1401. O'Hare is one of the few surnames which resisted the general tendency in the 18th century to discard the "Ó" in their name.

Since before the Anglo-Norman invasion of Ireland, the names in use in Ireland were in the Irish language; however, the English forced the Irish to adopt English surnames. Accordingly, it was enacted by the statute of the English king, Edward IV (1465), that every Irishman dwelling within the Pale – which comprised the counties of Dublin, Kildare, Louth, and Meath – should take an English surname. The Irish people were forced into adopting an English surname, or at least an English version of their Irish surname, therefore many removed the "Mac" or "Ó" from their surname.

However, the O'Hehir and O'Hare families did not drop the "Ó", nor did they adopt an English version of their surnames. As a result, they had to endure extreme hardship and suffering because of such opposition. (The creation of societies such as the Gaelic League in the late 19th century resulted in the widespread resumption of the "Mac" and "Ó" prefixes to many Irish surnames.)

== People with the surname O'Hare ==
- Brendan O'Hare, Scottish musician
- Christopher O'Hare, American artist, sculptor and inventor
- Damian O'Hare, Irish actor
- David O'Hare, Irish tennis player
- Davy O'Hare, Irish footballer
- Denis O'Hare, American actor
- Dessie O'Hare, Irish republican paramilitary fighter
- Edward O'Hare, U.S. Navy pilot
- Edward J. O'Hare, American lawyer
- Hefin O'Hare, Irish rugby union player
- James Haldane O'Hare, Scottish Theatrical scenic and costume designer.
- John O'Hare, Australian actor, director, teacher
- John O'Hare, Scottish footballer
- Joseph A. O'Hare, Jesuit priest
- Kate Richards O'Hare, American activist
- Kevin O'Hare, British ballet dancer, the Royal Ballet director from 2012
- Majella O'Hare, Irish school girl, who was killed by a British soldier
- Mark O'Hare, American cartoonist
- Michael O'Hare, American actor
- Rita O'Hare, General Secretary of Sinn Féin
- Turlough O'Hare, Canadian swimmer
- William F. O'Hare, American Catholic bishop
- Justin T. O’Hare, American Missouri Man

== Fictional characters ==
- Aloysius O'Hare, the main antagonist from the animated film The Lorax
- Tulip O'Hare, fictional character from the comic book series Preacher
- Bucky O'Hare, is a fictional character and the hero of an eponymous comic book series and spin-off media, including an animated TV series and various toys and video games. He was created by comic book writer Larry Hama and comic book artist Michael Golden[1] between 1977 and 1978[2] and made its publishing debut in Echo of Futurepast #1 in May 1984 Continuity Comics.[3]

== See also ==
- Hare (surname)
- O'Hair
- O'Hara
