= John O'Hara (disambiguation) =

John O'Hara (1905–1970) was an American writer of Appointment in Samarra, Butterfield 8, and many short stories.

John O'Hara may also refer to:

== Law and politics ==
- John J. O'Hara (1885–1954), Michigan politician
- Sir John Ailbe O'Hara (born 1958), Northern Ireland judge
- John O'Hara (Brooklyn politician) (born 1961), American lawyer

== Sports ==
- Jack O'Hara (John James O'Hara, 1866–1931), Australian rules footballer
- John O'Hara (wrestler) (1913–1983), Australian wrestler
- John O'Hara (American football) (1944–1992), American football coach
- John O'Hara (soccer, born 1959), American soccer defender
- John O'Hara (footballer, born 1981), Irish soccer goalkeeper

== Others ==
- John Bernard O'Hara (1862–1927), Australian poet
- John Myers O'Hara (1870–1944), American poet
- John Francis O'Hara (1888–1960), American cardinal
- John Joseph O'Hara (born 1946), American Roman Catholic prelate

== Other uses ==
- O'Hara's Playboys, a.k.a. "John O'Hara and His Playboys", British music group
