= O'Hara =

O'Hara may refer to:

== Place names ==
- Cardinal O'Hara High School (Springfield, Pennsylvania), United States
- Lake O'Hara, a lake in Yoho National Park, British Columbia, Canada
- O'Hara Glacier, a glacier in Antarctica
- O'Hara Township, Allegheny County, Pennsylvania, United States

== Other uses ==
- O'Hara (surname)
- O'Hara, an 1825 novel by William Hamilton Maxwell
- O'Hara (band), a 1960s Yugoslav rock band
- O'Hara, U.S. Treasury, a 1970s crime television series
- The People Against O'Hara, a 1951 film starring Spencer Tracy
- The Book of O'Hara (Leabhar Í Eadhra), a 1951 collection of poetry from the royal O'Hara family, edited by Lambert McKenna

== See also ==
- Ohara (disambiguation)
- O'Hare (disambiguation)
- Justice O'Hara (disambiguation)
