= Thomas O'Hara =

Thomas or Tom O'Hara may refer to:

- Thomas O'Hara (politician) (1911–1984), Irish politician, merchant and auctioneer
- Tom O'Hara (runner) (1942–2019), American runner
- Thomas J. O'Hara (born 1949), American Catholic priest
- Tom O'Hara (baseball) (1880–1954), American outfielder in Major League Baseball
- Tom O'Hara, character in The 13th Man
- Tommy O'Hara (1952–2016), Scottish footballer
