= Mary O'Hara (TV series) =

Australian TV series

- Genre: Music television
- Presented by: Mary O'Hara
- Country of origin: Australia
- Original language: English

Production
- Running time: 10-15 minutes

Original release
- Network: ATN-7
- Release: 1960

Mary O'Hara was an early Australian television series which aired in 1960 and likely ended the same year. Information on this series is scarce. It was produced by and aired on ATN-7 (it is not clear if it aired on other stations in Australia). As the title suggests, it was hosted by popular Irish singer and harpist Mary O'Hara, who performed in each episode. The episodes ran between 10 and 15 minutes. Episodes were directed by Terrence Hughes. 12 of the episodes are held by National Film and Sound Archive.
