= Michael M. O'Hara =

Michael Mullen O'Hara (born October 10, 1959) is an American educator, author, and historian of theatre.

== Personal life and education ==
O'Hara was born in Princeton, New Jersey, to Francis James and Patricia (Smith) O'Hara. He attended Hopewell Valley Central High School and received a Bachelor of Arts degree in English/drama from Fordham University.

He received his Master of Arts in theatre history in 1990 at the University of Maryland, College Park. In 1997, he received his PhD in theatre history, theory and criticism from the same university.

He is married to Laura (Shue) O'Hara.

== Professional career and publications ==
From 1985 to 1986, O'Hara taught at the Canterbury School in Fort Myers, Florida. He then taught theatre and drama for a year at The Nottingham Academy in Colora, Maryland.

Since 1997, O'Hara has been a professor of theater at Ball State University, where he is now Professor of Theatre. He was previously a Sursa Distinguished Professor, the Associate Dean for the College of Fine Arts, and a winner of the Dean's Teaching Award.

He has published scholarly work on George Bernard Shaw, American Theatre, and theatre pedagogy. Pearson Education published his digital text book Explore Theatre in 2012, a 2nd Edition in 2018. He has publishing 40 papers and lectures on theatre pedagogy. His publication, "Technology & Theatre Pedagogy: A Call To the Trenches", appears in Teaching Theatre Today, second edition, published by Palgrave Macmillan Press.
