= Francis O'Hara =

Scottish footballer

Personal information
- Date of birth: 31 August 1883
- Place of birth: Coatbridge, Scotland
- Date of death: 12 July 1915 (aged 31)
- Place of death: Gallipoli, Çanakkale, Turkey
- Position: Centre forward

Senior career*
Years	Team	Apps	(Gls)
- Strathclyde
- Albion Rovers
1905–1906	Chelsea	1	(0)
- Albion Rovers
- Wigan Town
- Birmingham City
- Pendlebury
- Royal Albert
- * Club domestic league appearances and goals

Francis O'Hara (31 August 1883 – 12 July 1915) was a Scottish footballer who played as a centre forward.

== Club career ==
O'Hara began his footballing career in his native Scotland with both Strathclyde and Albion Rovers before a move to English side Chelsea in August 1905. He played for one season with Chelsea, playing once in the league, and twice in the FA Cup, where he scored three goals. He returned to Albion Rovers in the summer of 1906, before going on to play for Wigan Town, Birmingham City, Pendlebury and Royal Albert.

== Military career ==
O'Hara signed up for the army in December 1899, lying about his age and joining the Highland Light Infantry. He served in South Africa and Egypt, serving until late 1904, but remaining a reservist until 1913. At the outbreak of the First World War in 1914, O'Hara reenlisted in the Highland Light Infantry, and was killed in action only a year later, on 12 July 1915, in the Gallipoli Campaign.

He was commemorated in Chelsea's Roll of Honour on Armistice Day 2021.

== Personal life ==
O'Hara assaulted a police officer in Fulham on 24 April 1906, and after failing to appear at a summons, he was arrested in his hometown of Coatbridge, Scotland, and brought back to London on 29 September 1906. He was quoted as saying "I am very sorry, but I am glad the bottle did not hit you", and was ordered to pay 10 shillings or spend one day in prison.
