= John J. O'Hara =

John J. O'Hara may also refer to:

- John J. O'Hara (politician) (1885–1954), Michigan politician
- John J. O'Hara (judge) (1922–1997), justice of the Kentucky Supreme Court
- John Joseph O'Hara (born 1946), American prelate of the Roman Catholic Church
