= Joseph O'Hara =

Joseph O'Hara may refer to:

- Joseph P. O'Hara (1895–1975), U.S. Representative from Minnesota
- Joseph W. O'Hara (1863–1938), lawyer and judge from Ohio
