= Patrick O'Hara (artist) =

English artist of porcelain sculptures

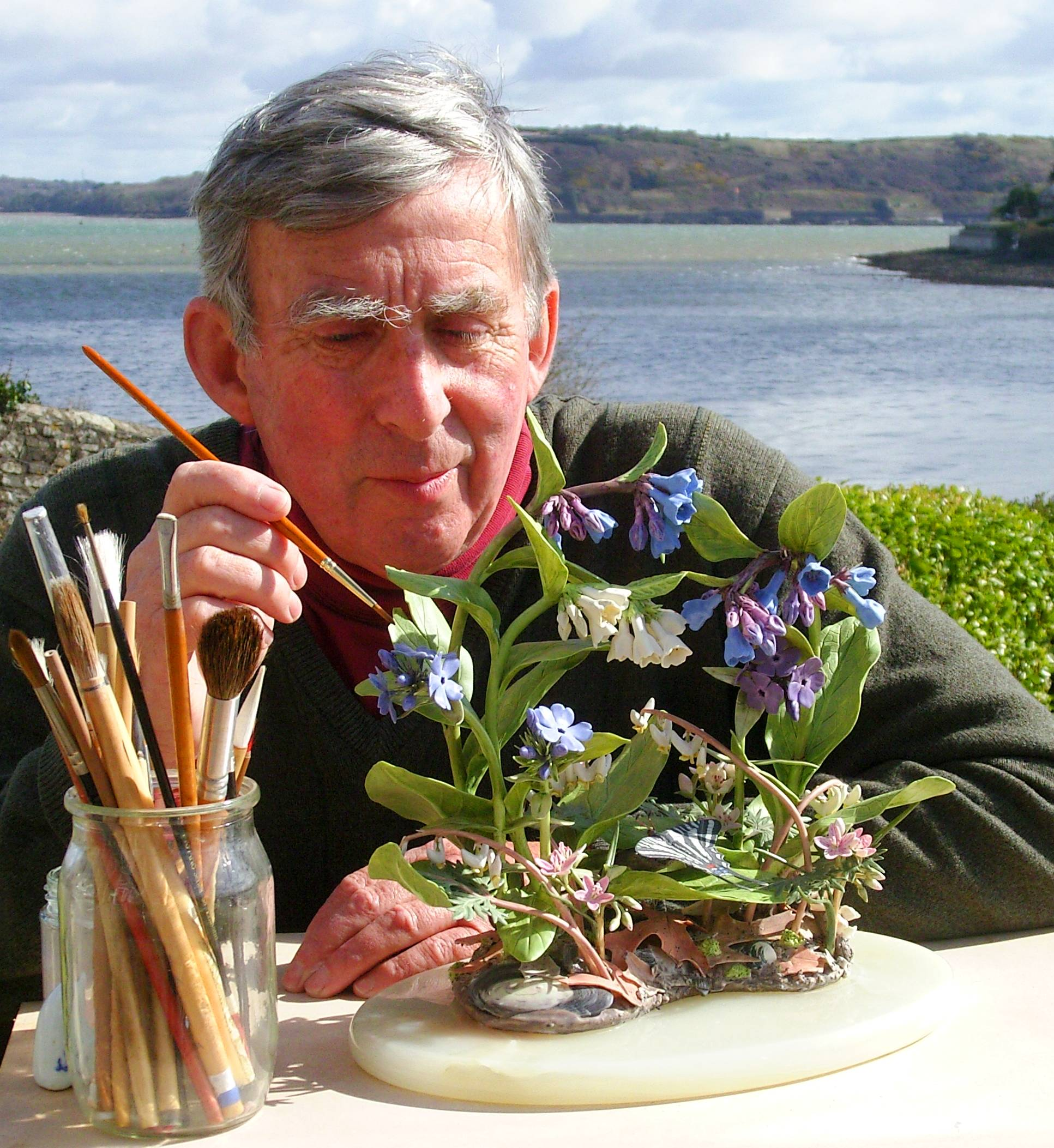
- O'Hara with one of his sculptures in 2010
- Born: 1936 (age 89–90); Windsor, England
- Education: Haileybury and Imperial Service College; University of Reading; Malvern School of Art
- Known for: Sculpture; Ceramic art Porcelain; Watercolor; Wildlife conservation
- Elected: Linnean Society of London
- Patrons: Jean Flagler Matthews; Taoiseach Charles Haughey; Lewis Ginter Botanical Garden; Santa Barbara Botanic Garden
- Website: www.oharasculpture.com

Patrick O'Hara (born 1936) is an English artist and sculptor. His main subjects are wildflowers and butterflies, focusing in particular on endangered species. He is known for his highly delicate work in porcelain, portraying wildflowers and insects life-size, with incredible attention to detail and accuracy.

== Early life and education ==
Patrick O'Hara was born in Windsor, England., in 1936, having ancestral roots in County Mayo, Ireland. His father was a Latin and geography teacher, and his great uncle Alfred Scorer was an eminent entomologist, and O'Hara showed a keen interest in natural history from an early age. He was educated at Haileybury and Imperial Service College, and studied botany, zoology and geology at University of Reading.

== Early career ==
Before becoming successful as an artist, O'Hara worked as an agricultural advisor for Spillers and Unilever. After taking evening classes in ceramics at Malvern School of Art, he began selling Earthenware models of traction engines, fairground organs and veteran cars at London department stores such as Harrods and Liberty's, with prices between £25 and £40. O'Hara was then commissioned by Lord Stokes to model British Leyland veteran cars for display in their offices in Basingstoke. After these initial successes, O'Hara, being a trained botanist, started creating porcelain models of wild flowers and butterflies.

At school, he was thrown out of pottery class.

== Exhibitions ==
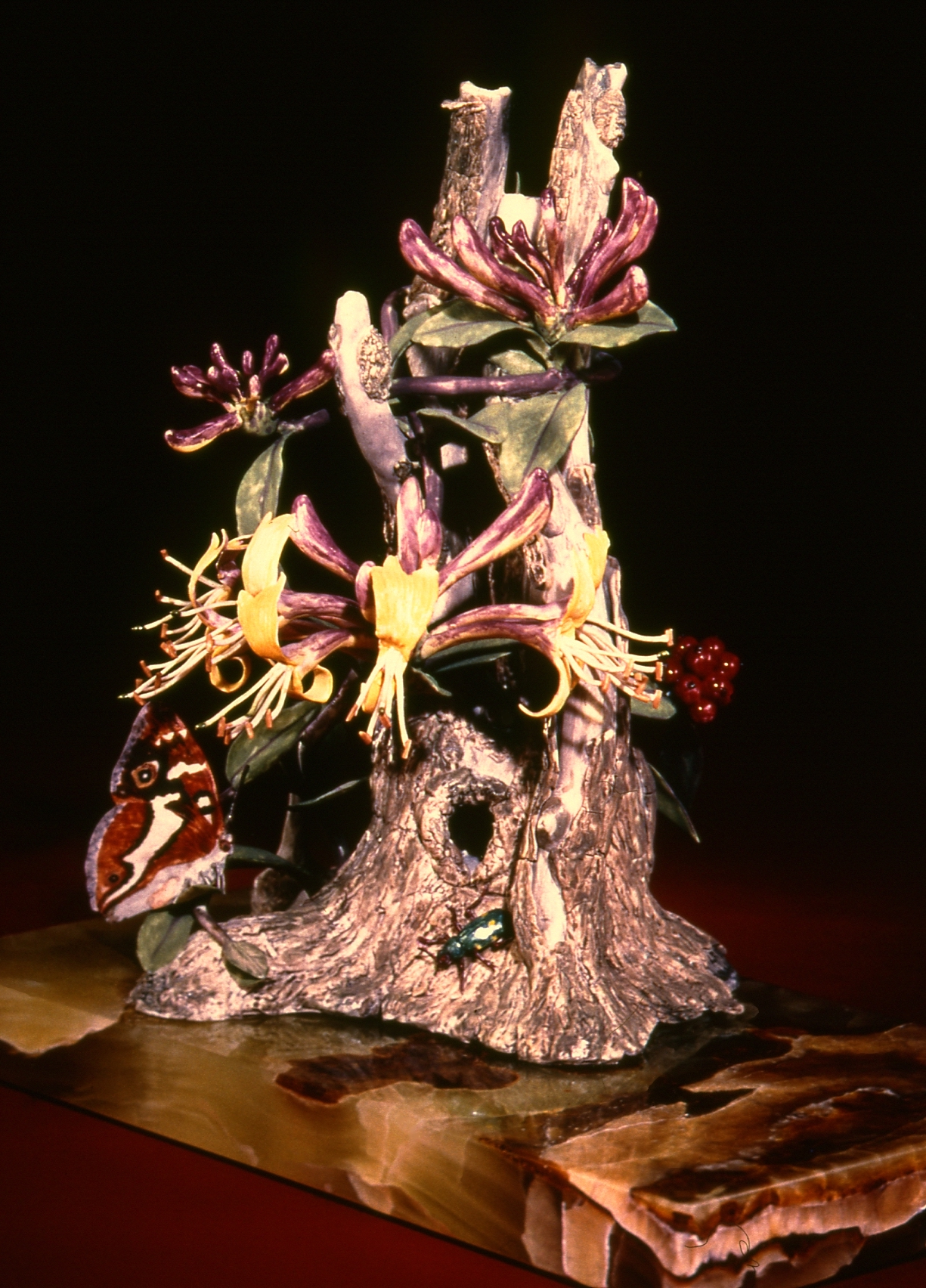
Porcelain sculpture by Patrick O'Hara showing honeysuckle, a tiger beetle and a Purple Emperor butterfly. Exhibited at O'Hara's first exhibition in Cartier in New York in 1972. Height 19 cm.

Just two years after O'Hara started creating ceramic art, he had his first solo exhibition in Cartier in New York's Fifth Avenue in December 1972, with prices ranging between $3,000 and $16,000. The exhibition took place in a darkened room, with his sculptures lit up by hidden lighting, showcasing the translucent nature of porcelain. His exhibits of wild flowers and insects in porcelain were described as exceptionally fine, accurate and scientifically flawless, with even the insects' antennae hand-modelled in porcelain. They included models of gorse, lady orchid, brown toadstool, and Queen of Spain fritillary butterfly. His exhibition was well-received and compared to the famous Glass Flowers of the Ware Collection, as well as to Fabergé. The exhibition was followed by another at Cartier's branch in Beverly Hills, California in 1973.

O'Hara's first exhibition in London took place in the Moorland Gallery in October 1973, and within one hour of the opening, six sculptures had been sold for more than £6,000. The exhibition featured nineteen original sculptures in total, each one being made in pure porcelain, with no wire or plastic used, sometimes only one thirtieth of an inch thick. One stand for a 20th sculpture remained empty, as the wild gladioli that O'Hara had intended to model, had all been picked. He left the stand empty as an appeal to the public not to pick rare flowers. The largest sculpture at the exhibition featured a peony that grows wild only on Steep Holm island, and many of the exhibits are mounted on polished onyx or rosewood bases. Five percent of the sale of a sculpture of sea holly and Glanville fritillary were donated to the Hampshire and Isle of Wight Wildlife Trust. His work was described at the time as "probably the most delicate porcelain in the West", and O'Hara was called one of the world's great wildlife artists. Arthur Negus praised his work calling it "superb" and "antiques of the future".

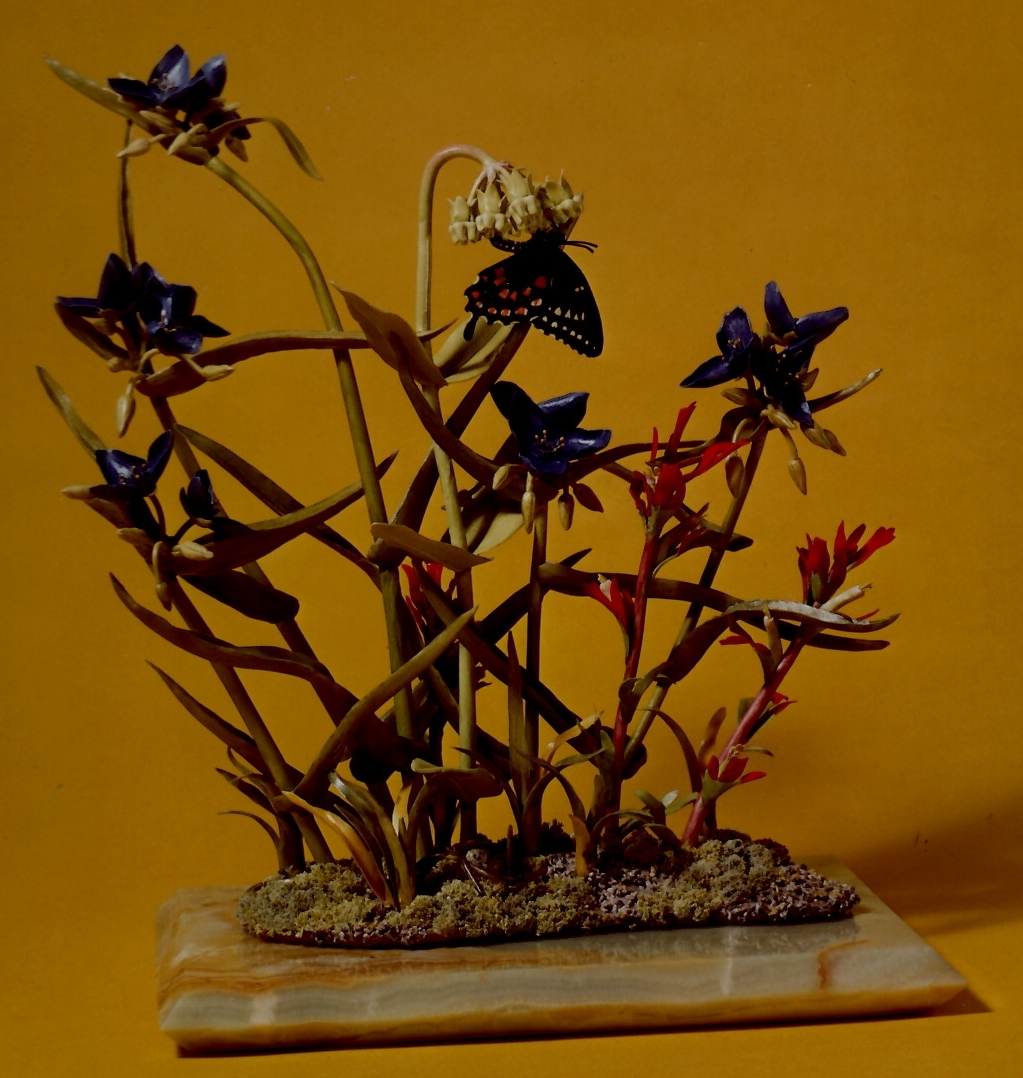
Porcelain sculpture by Patrick O'Hara displaying Mead's Milkweek with Spiderwort & Indian Paintbrush. Exhibited at Barclays Bank Chicago 1975.

In 1975, O'Hara undertook a trip down the Mississippi to study the wildflowers growing there, and to make many notes and drawings, including creating colour charts. These, he brought back to his studio in England to create porcelain sculptures depicting the flowers he had studied. His route followed that of renowned American bird artist Audubon. Many of the flowers he studied are rare or endangered species, including Mead's milkweed, as O'Hara was hoping to draw attention to the need for conservation. The sculptures went on show at two exhibitions in America in 1975, at the Chicago Flower and Garden Show, which at the time was the largest indoor flower show in the world, and at an exhibition at Barclays bank in Chicago. O'Hara is described as enjoying "a freedom and delicacy which give originality and aesthetic appeal to his highly individual works. [...] Patrick works exclusively in porcelain and has acquired, in a few short years, an enviable reputation for his exquisite sculptures of wild flowers [...] Patrick is the consummate artist, botanist and craftsman in porcelain."

After moving to Cork Harbour, Ireland, O'Hara exhibited at the Wexford Festival in 1976 with sculptures showing wild flowers and butterflies that can be found on the Irish coast. They were regarded as real collector's items but that may appeal only to a certain taste.

Further exhibitions followed, including at the Royal Horticultural Society in London in 1979., where O'Hara was the first ever artist showing botanical artwork other than paintings or drawings. In April 1980, he exhibited at Bank of Ireland in Dublin, followed by an exhibition in Zürich in October that same year, featuring porcelain sculptures of rare and protected Alpine flowers. The proceeds of one of the sculptures at his Swiss exhibition, featuring a marsh orchid, were donated to the Swiss League for the Protection of Nature Pro Natura.

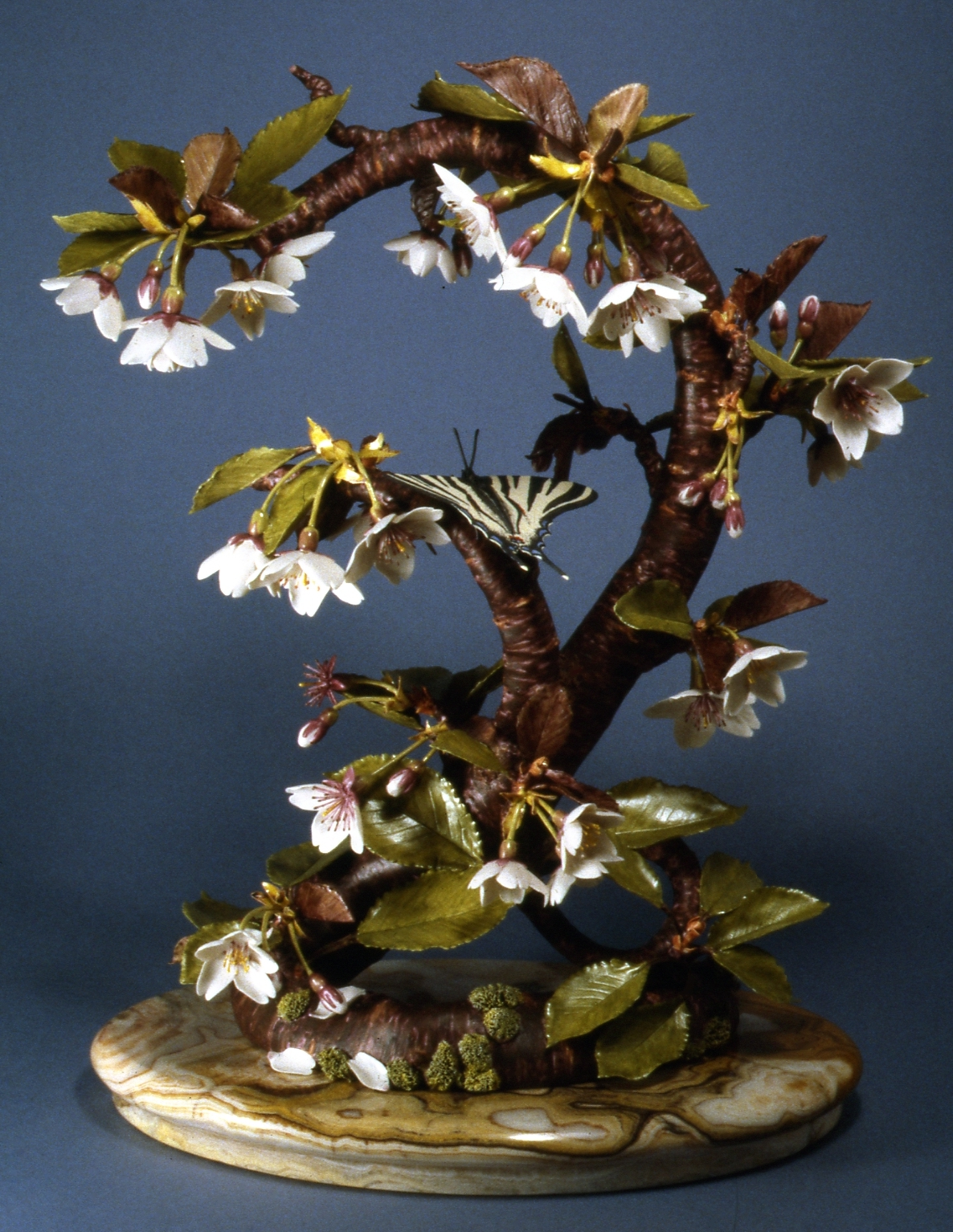
Porcelain Sculpture by Patrick O'Hara showing Prunis avium. Exhibited at the United Nations in Geneva in 1984 (International Year for Plant Conservation). Height 30 cm.

In 1984, O'Hara was the first living artist to exhibit at the Chester Beatty Library in Dublin. This was followed by an exhibition at the United Nations in Geneva entitled 'Secret Gardens of the World' to draw attention to the global need for plant conservation. To underline his approach to conservation, O'Hara never picks a flower to model it, but studies them in the wild. Proceeds of this exhibition supported the International Union for Conservation of Nature.

At an exhibition in Pennsylvania in 1988, O'Hara's botanical sculptures were priced up to $26,000., and described as "so lifelike you can almost smell their fragrance".

Expo '90, the International Garden and Greenery Exposition, in Osaka, Japan, included several O'Hara sculptures of medicinal plants, and one of his sculptures is housed in The Adachi Institute of Woodcut Prints in Tokyo, while another is in the Embassy of Ireland, Tokyo.

In 1994, an exhibition at Wakehurst Place followed, organised by the Royal Botanic Gardens, Kew. At this exhibition, O'Hara not only exhibited porcelain sculptures, but also artworks in glass and watercolour, depicting flora and fauna from many different parts of the world.

In June 2002, thirty years after his first exhibition in New York, O'Hara exhibited porcelain sculptures, pâte-sur-pâte plaques and watercolour paintings at the National Botanic Gardens (Ireland). Sculptures in this exhibition were priced between €6,000 and €12,000.

2004 saw O'Hara holding an exhibition at Fota House, Co. Cork showing twenty four different porcelain sculptures, pâte-sur-pâte plaques and watercolours, depicting flora and fauna from his travels to the US, Switzerland, Saudi Arabia, the UAE and Oman.

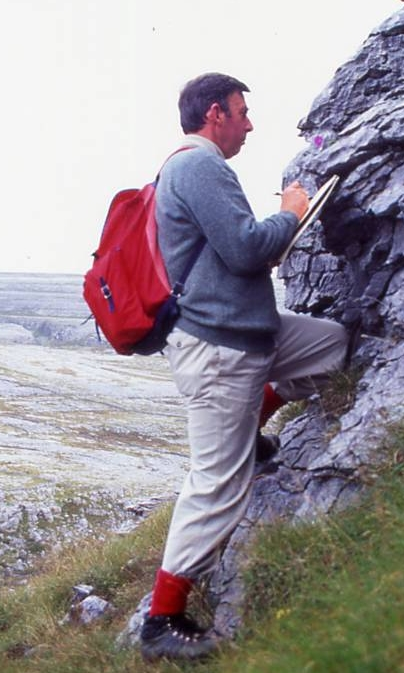
Patrick O'Hara studying flowers on a field trip in the Burren, County Clare, Ireland

In 2008, O'Hara had two exhibitions in California, one at the American Museum of Ceramic Art and one at Santa Barbara Botanic Garden, featuring the first ten of a series of watercolour paintings he was commissioned to do by the botanic garden. The aim of this commission was to highlight rare endemic species and support their conservation. The next exhibition at Santa Barbara Botanic Garden followed in 2009, by which time O'Hara had painted twenty watercolours of Californian wildflowers.

By 2011, O'Hara had completed all thirty watercolour paintings for this series, which were exhibited alongside some sculptures in Boole Library Gallery of University College Cork, Ireland, and which he hoped would inspire more students to study botany. He made prints of the thirty watercolour paintings, and donated one of each to the Irish Heritage Trust, which houses them at Fota House in Cork harbour. A review of the exhibition calls O'Hara "an 'ecological artist' rather than a botancial artist" highlighting his speciality in not presenting "the plants in isolation but rather to present them as entire ecosystems".

His last exhibition before retiring was at the Wildling Museum of Art and Nature in Solvang, California, in 2013. It showcased his entire collection of thirty watercolour paintings commissioned by Santa Barbara Botanic Garden.

He did one final exhibition in 2017, in his own home Manor House in Curraghbinny in Cork harbour, before selling the house. It featured works of art both by him and his late wife, landscape painter Anna O'Hara. He was admired for not only the artwork but also for his commercially successful business which provided O'Hara and his family with a living as well as making significant contributions to plant conservation.

== Notable commissions and collections ==
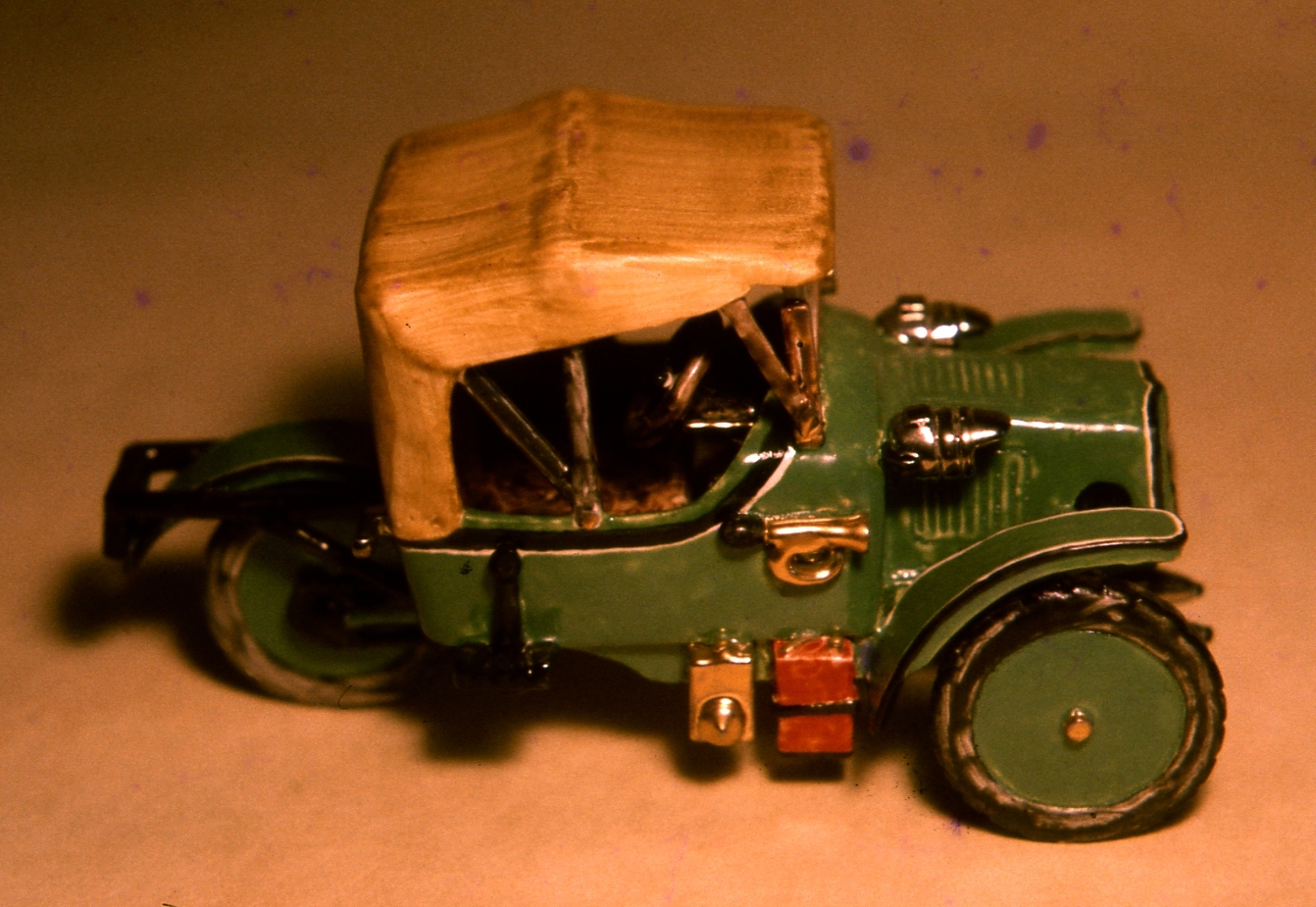
Earthenware model of 1913 Morgan 3 wheel cyclocar by Patrick O'Hara. Height 7.5 cm. Commissioned in 1970 by Peter Morgan, chairman of Morgan Car Company.

One of O'Hara's first commissions was by Lord Stokes to model British Leyland veteran cars in Earthenware for display in their offices in Basingstoke in 1973, including models of the first Morris, Austin and Jaguar cars

In 1977, O'Hara was commissioned to create a series of porcelain sculptures for Hutschenreuther, a porcelain factory in Bavaria, who turned them into limited editions, using almost one hundred moulds for one sculpture.

In 1979, O'Hara was commissioned to make a sculpture of the rare Badgeworth buttercup, which was then presented to the Museum of Gloucester.

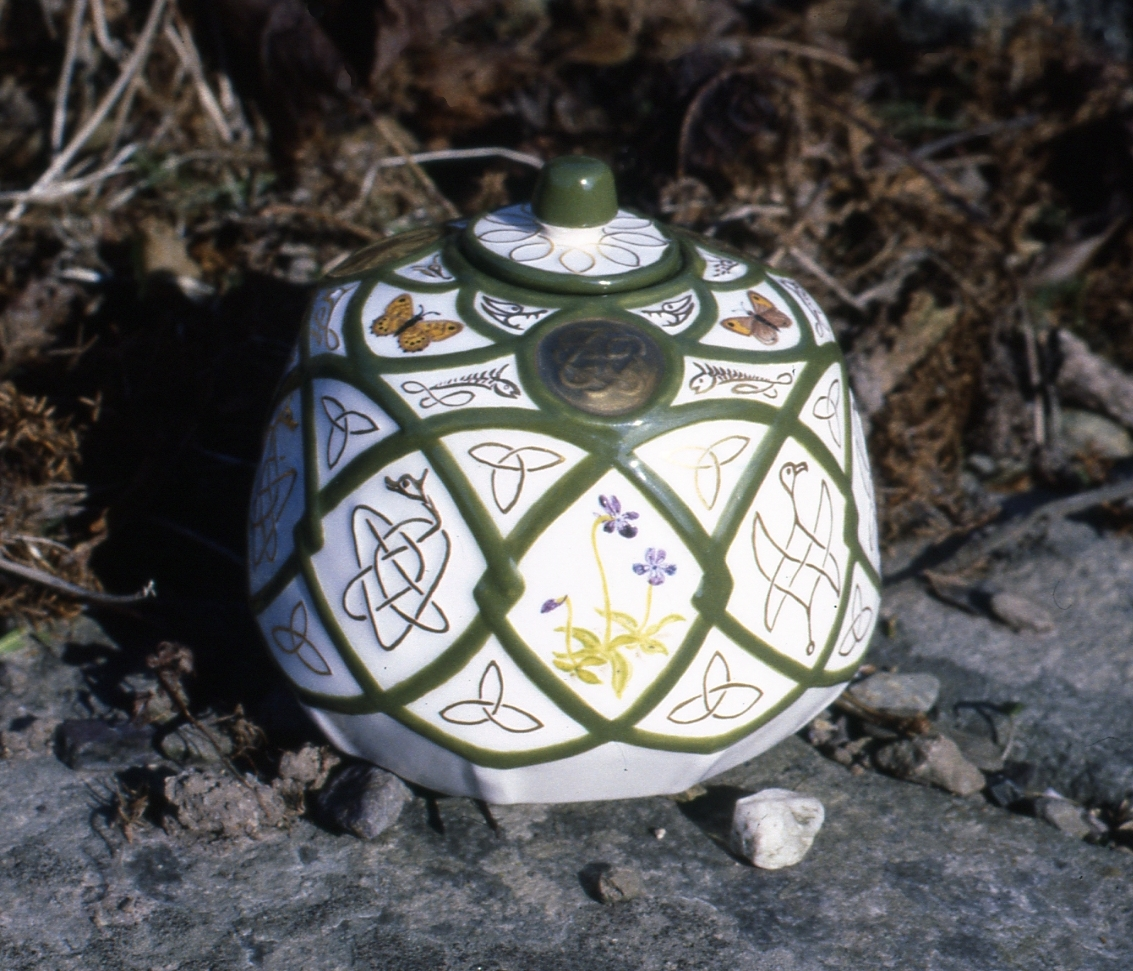
Porcelain sculpture by artist Patrick O'Hara showing the Celtic vase that was given to the President of India by Taoiseach Charles Haughey in 1982. Height 7.5 cm.

In 1982, O'Hara was commissioned by then Taoiseach Charles Haughey to make decorated Celtic vases to present to the President of India and to the Grand Duke of Luxembourg on their state visits. The vases show paintings of mythological creatures inspired by the Book of Kells, alongside Irish wildflowers and butterflies.

Several of O'Hara's sculptures are housed in the Flagler Museum in Florida, having been commissioned by Jean Flagler Matthews.

In 1989, SmithKline Beecham and Sumitomo Chemical jointly commissioned O'Hara to sculpt a series of medicinal plants, including the flowers of liquorice, ginger and ephedra, for display at Expo '90. As ginger flowers quite rarely and only for a brief time, he had to fly to Hong Kong at short notice to study the flower. To study ephedra in flower, he travelled to the border of Pakistan and Afghanistan.

This was followed by a commission by the combined British and American Pharmaceutical Societies to present as a gift to the Japanese Pharmaceutical Society.

In 1990, Lewis Ginter Botanical Garden in Richmond, Virginia commissioned a series of sculptures of rare American flowers as a permanent collection in their premises.

Other notable people in possession of O'Hara's works of art include President of France François Mitterrand, the Sultan of Oman, and Chancellor of Germany Helmut Kohl.

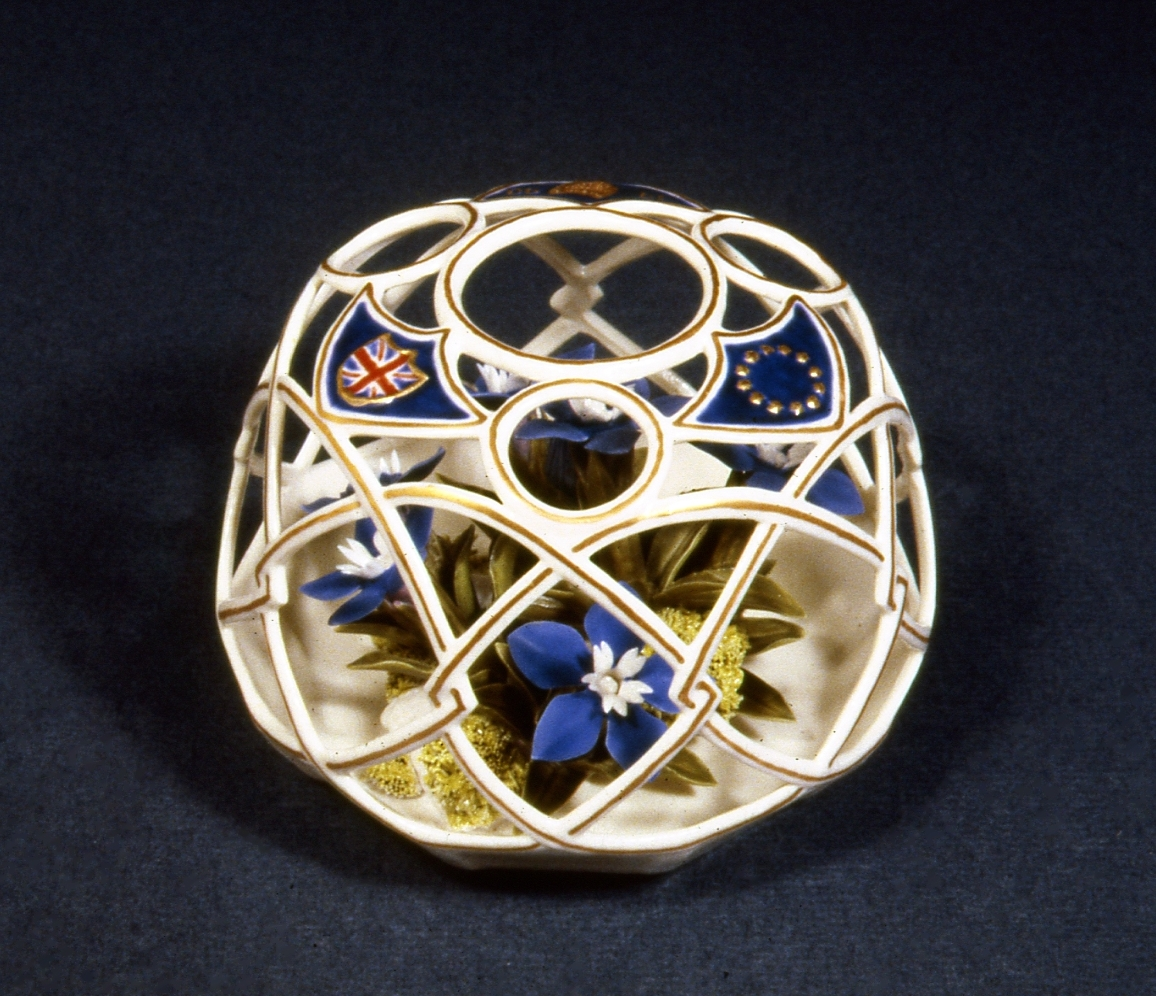
Porcelain sculpture by Patrick O'Hara showing Spring Gentian in a Celtic vase. Given to Lady Margaret Thatcher by Taoiseach Charles Haughey at the EC summit in Dublin in 1990. Diameter 10 cm.

In 1990, at a meeting of the Council of the European Union hosted in Dublin Castle, each of the then twelve European Heads of State was presented with a sculpted endangered life-size flower encased within a cage with Celtic decorations, which O'Hara calls his 'Secret Gardens'. Commissioned by then Taoiseach Charles Haughey to highlight the EU Habitats Directive, each flower was chosen appropriately for the recipient. For example, François Mitterrand received a sculpture of Primula allionii, which grows in an area of the French Alps where he liked to holiday. Margaret Thatcher received the blue Spring Gentian, while Helmut Kohl received the protected species Dianthus gratianopolitanus. Each of the Celtic vases bears the Irish and EU flags, as well as the national flag of the recipient's country.

To make these 'Secret Garden' vases, O'Hara first creates the vase as a hollow sphere, and then cuts the openings. The flower is then inserted, assembled and painted through the openings in the vase.

In 1993, Jefferson Smurfit Corp. commissioned a sculpture of the rare Bartram's Ixia, which grows in their Florida forests and only flowers briefly at dawn. With O'Hara's help, the company set up a conservation programme for the plant. The sculpture, which features fourteen different species, is now on display at the K Club in County Kildare, Ireland.

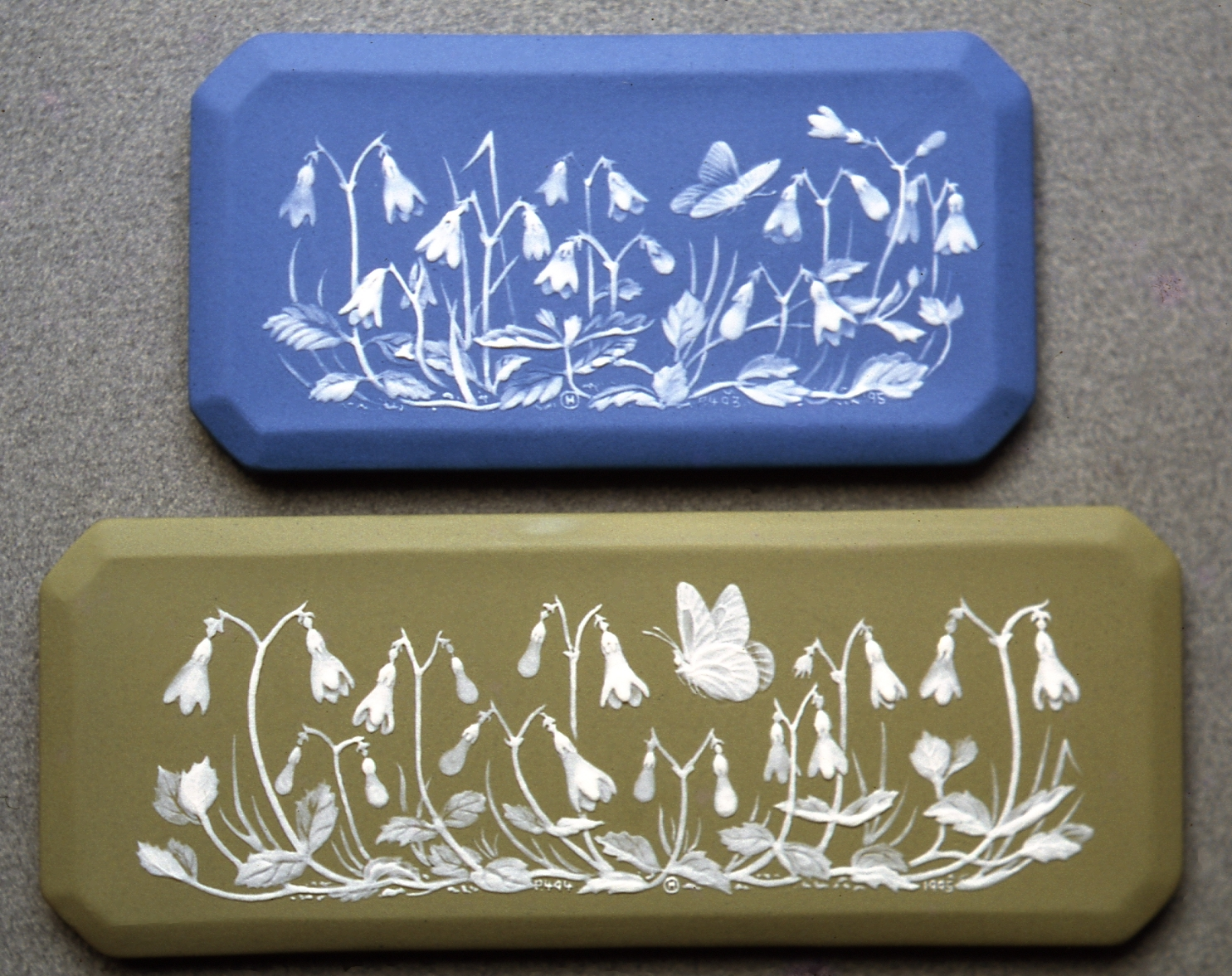
Pâte-sur-pâtes by Patrick O'Hara made in 1995. The green one is in the Ulster Museum in Belfast.

In 2008, O'Hara was commissioned to paint a series of watercolours of the wildflowers of California by Santa Barbara Botanic Garden. Unlike Victorian botanical paintings, his watercolours depict flowers in association with other plants and with the insects and birds that live off them, composing a particular natural habitat.

One of O'Hara's sculptures is in the National Museum of Ireland – Decorative Arts and History, while one of his Pâte-sur-pâte plaques is in the collection of the Ulster Museum.

By the time O'Hara retired from artwork, he had made nearly six hundred sculptures portraying over two thousand different species of plants and butterflies, as well as about one hundred watercolour paintings.

== Public appearances ==
In November 1973, O'Hara appeared on the Roundabout newsreel issue 138, produced by British Movietone News.

In 1974, the BBC made a documentary film about O'Hara's work as part of the 'Look, Stranger' series of programmes, which showed him making a porcelain sculpture of wildflowers over a three-week period.

David Seymour on BBC's The Arts Programme in 1975 described O'Hara as the "world's leading sculptor of wild flowers".

== Recognition ==
O'Hara was elected a Fellow of the Linnean Society of London in 1992.

Carl C. Dauterman, curator at the Metropolitan Museum of Art in New York, described O'Hara's work as "probably the most delicate porcelain ever produced in the West".

Naturalist Roger Tory Peterson commented on O'Hara's artwork "I am astounded to see such great botanical and entomological accuracy and detail in porcelain. Patrick O'Hara is not only a perceptive botanist - but, also, an artist of extraordinary skill".

John Patrick Cushion, Senior Research Assistant at Victoria and Albert Museum and lecturer at Morley College, mentions O'Hara in his book Animals in Pottery and Porcelain when he says "there was nothing that could not be made in porcelain, and modern artists are proving that he was right; none more so than Patrick O'Hara [...] who combines the beauty of wild flowers with that of butterflies and insects. [...] the delicate veins on the wings being applied in slip - similar to the famous pâte-sur-pâte of Marc Louis Solon".

Wilfrid Blunt, author of the great standard The Art of Botanical Illustration (1950) writes in 1987 that he "would sooner own a piece by O'Hara than one by Fabergé", and reckons that O'Hara has "surpassed" the work of the Ware Collection of Blaschka Glass Models of Plants.

== Technique ==
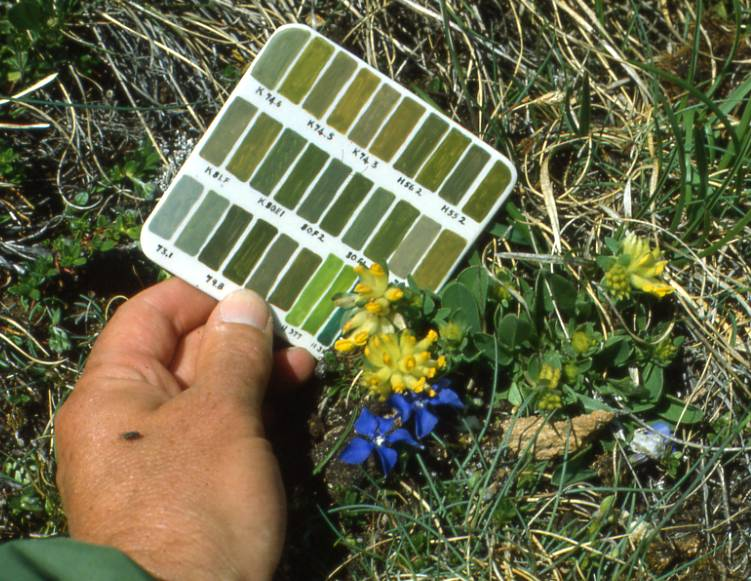
Colour matching with Patrick O'Hara's ceramic tile

O'Hara's work has been described as a synthesis of art and science. Each of his sculptures is a unique piece, and could take O'Hara up to three months to complete. The mineral clay he uses is a translucent hard-paste porcelain, which he gets from Stoke-on-Trent, and is based on a Japanese formula. He would then age the clay for three or four years by keeping it in damp darkness.

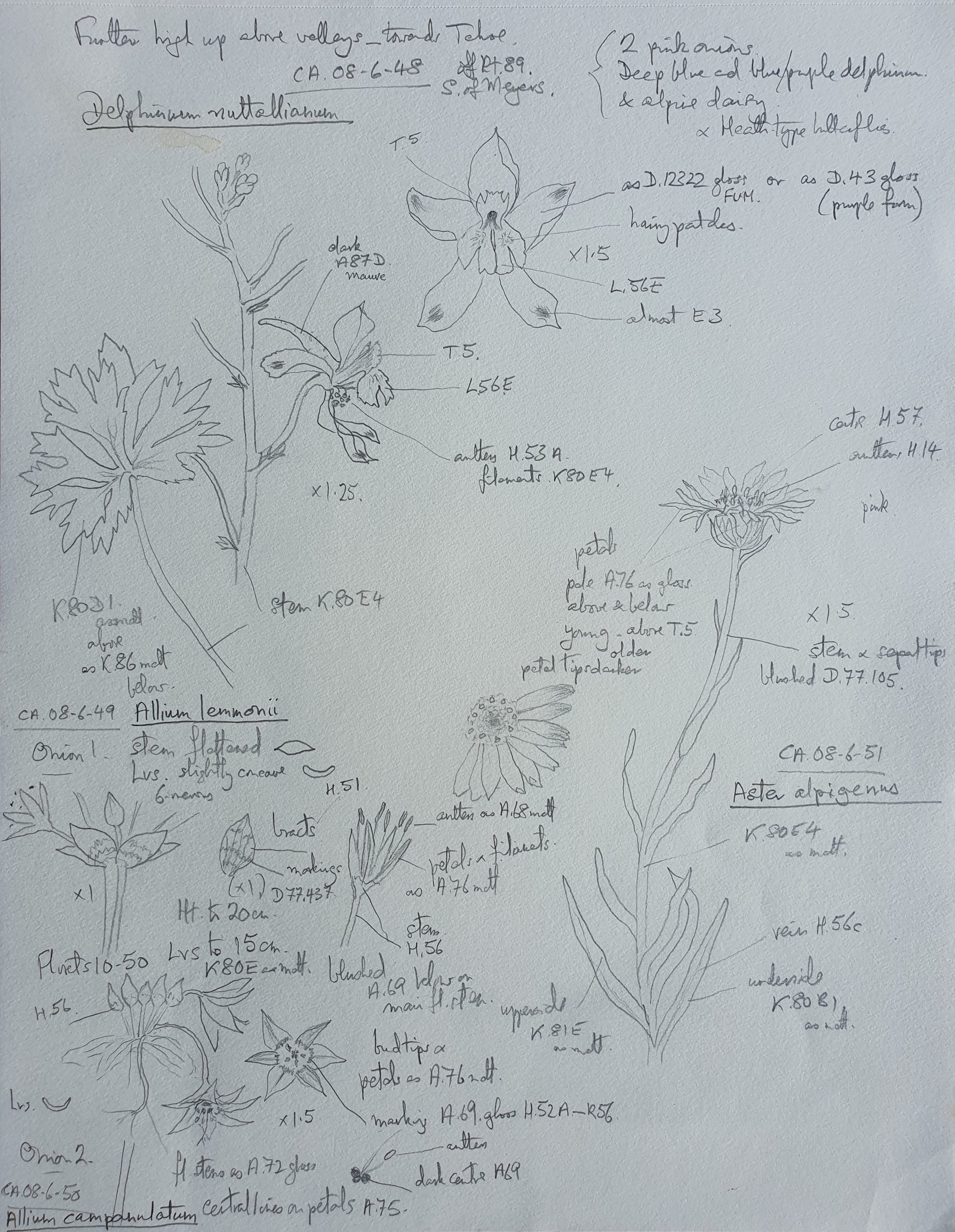
Sample Field Drawing by Patrick O'Hara

Before O'Hara starts modelling the flowers and insects in clay, he makes detailed field drawings studying the species in the wild, travelling through the US, Europe, Asia and Africa. His drawings are rather like engineers' drawings, measuring the distance between leaves, the length of leaves, and how many petals there are. He also matches the plant's colours to a colour palette of fired samples of glazes, as the colour glazes for porcelain look very different before and after firing.

To model the plants and insects in clay, he uses dental instruments, scalpels and tweezers. As metal tools can leave traces, he uses ceramic blades to make sure the porcelain stays pure. Some parts of his sculptures, such as butterflies' wings or antennae, are less than 1 mm thin, and such delicate works in porcelain had not previously been achieved in the Western world. The entire sculpture is then assembled using only water and clay, and fired in one piece, at 1,000°C. Some sculptures are made up of several thousand pieces before the final product is ready for firing.

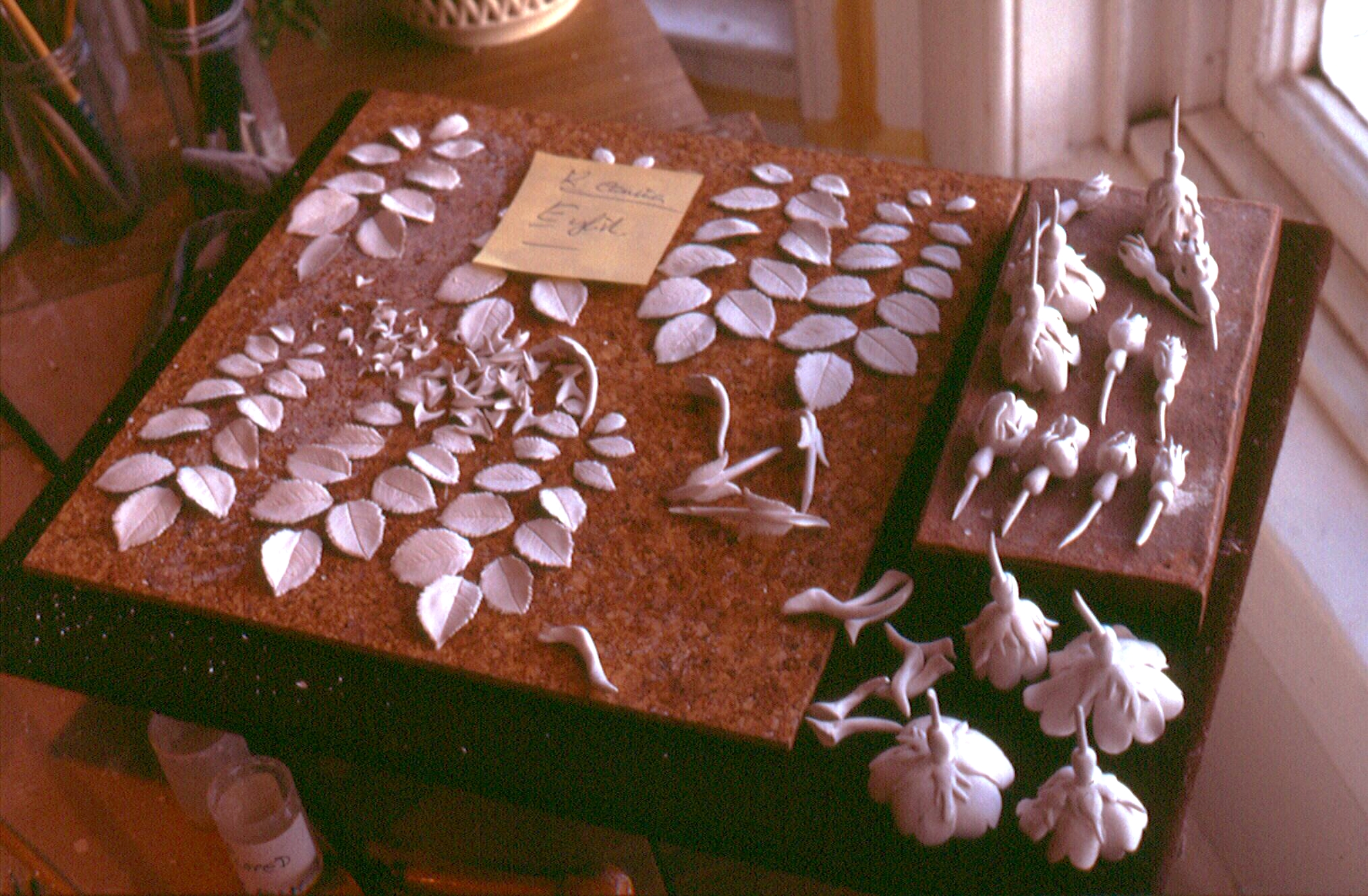
Individual pieces of a sculpture by Patrick O'Hara before assembly

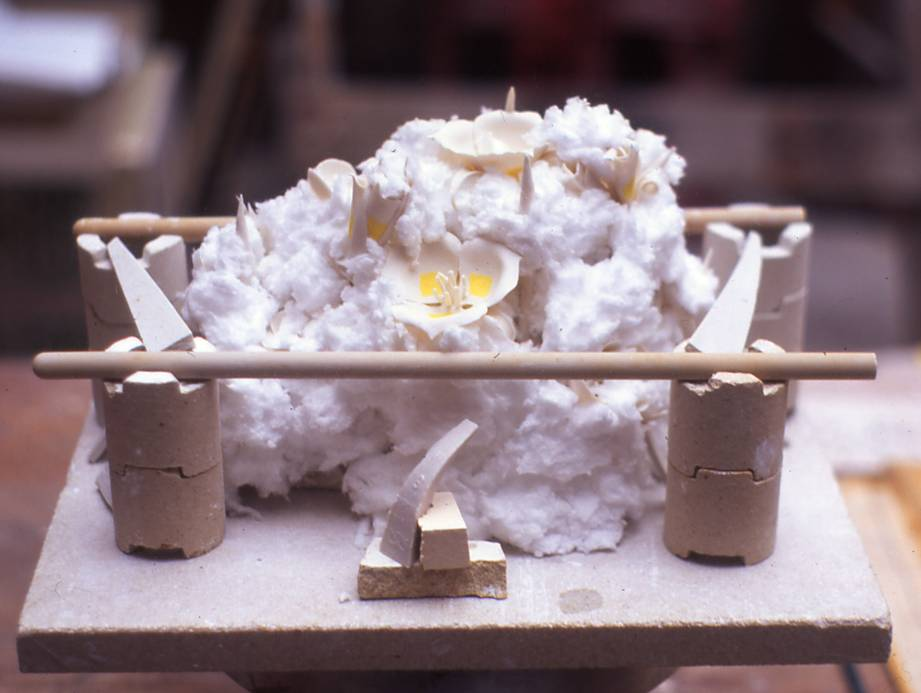
A sculpture by Patrick O'Hara propped up with ceramic wool for firing in the kiln

Because the porcelain clay softens during the second firing process at 1,283°C, every single part of the sculpture down to the thin insect antenna has to be propped up with pre-fired clay rods and ceramic wool. Furthermore, a 12.5% shrinkage during firing has to be taken into account.

After this stage, the supports are removed, and the sculpture is painted with glazes. He has a colour palette of around 4,500 different colour glazes, including matte and glossy shades, including more than seventy shades of green. The sculpture is then fired another five to six times in the kiln, at different temperatures for the different glazes, each firing taking up to 48 hours.

None of his sculptures contain any wire to support them, but most are mounted on bases of onyx, marble or wood.

To transport or ship a finished sculpture, O'Hara places them inside a specially designed wooden box of the kind used for transporting microscopes, with padding only on the outside of the box.

== Personal life ==
Patrick O'Hara was married to Anna, an art teacher and landscape painter. They had two children, Rachel and Simon. Anna died in 2013. O'Hara was remarried in 2019, to Daniela.

== Gallery of works ==
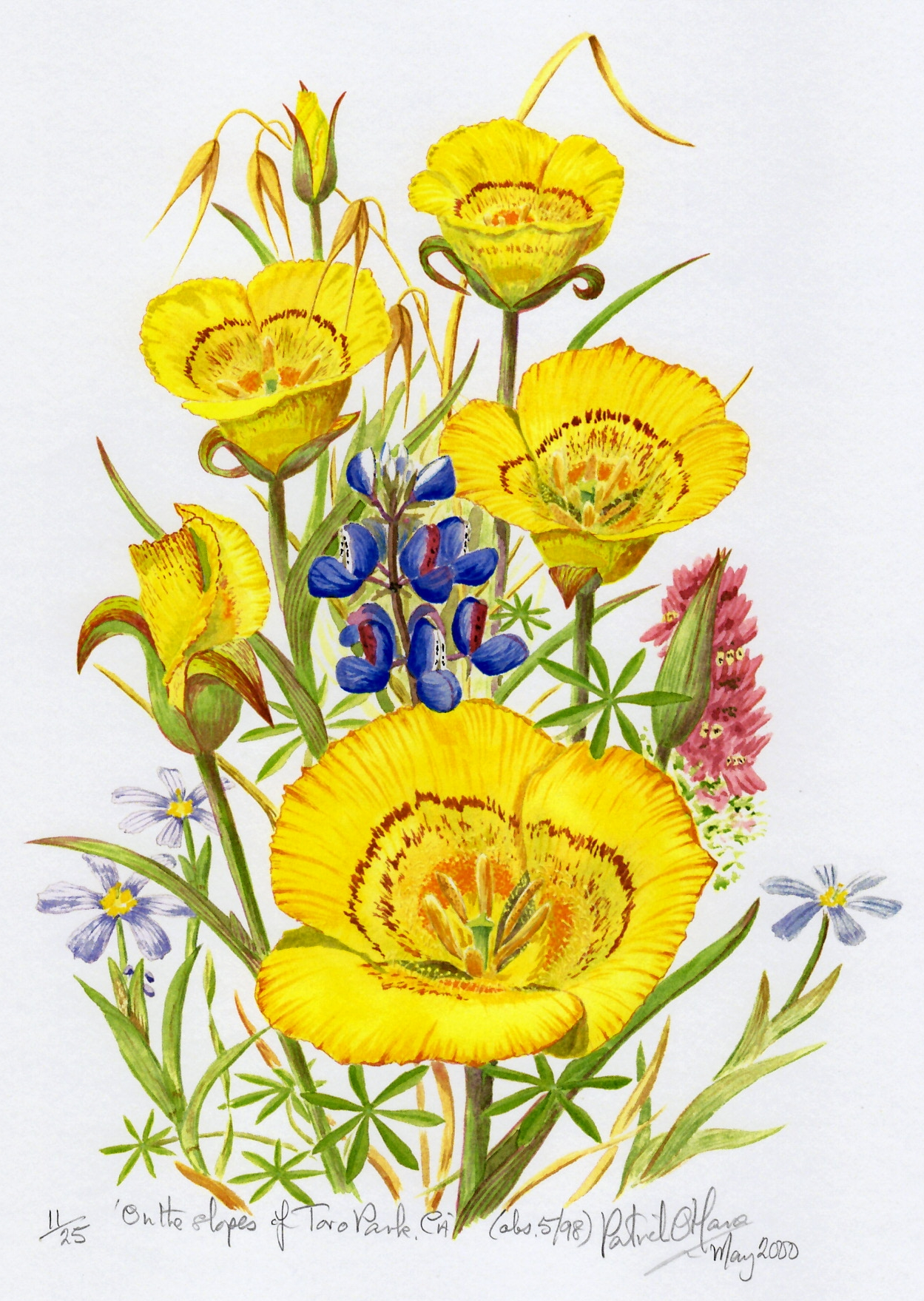
Watercolour 'On the Slopes of Toro Park California' by Patrick O'Hara made in 2000

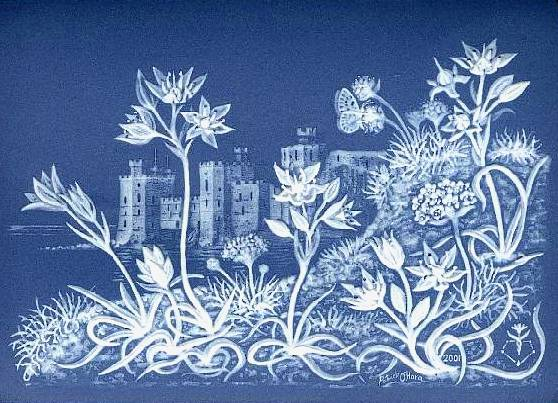
Pâte-sur-pâte plaque presented to Prince Charles and commissioned by Molecular Nature Ltd. Made by Patrick O'Hara in 2001. Size 16 cm by 12 cm

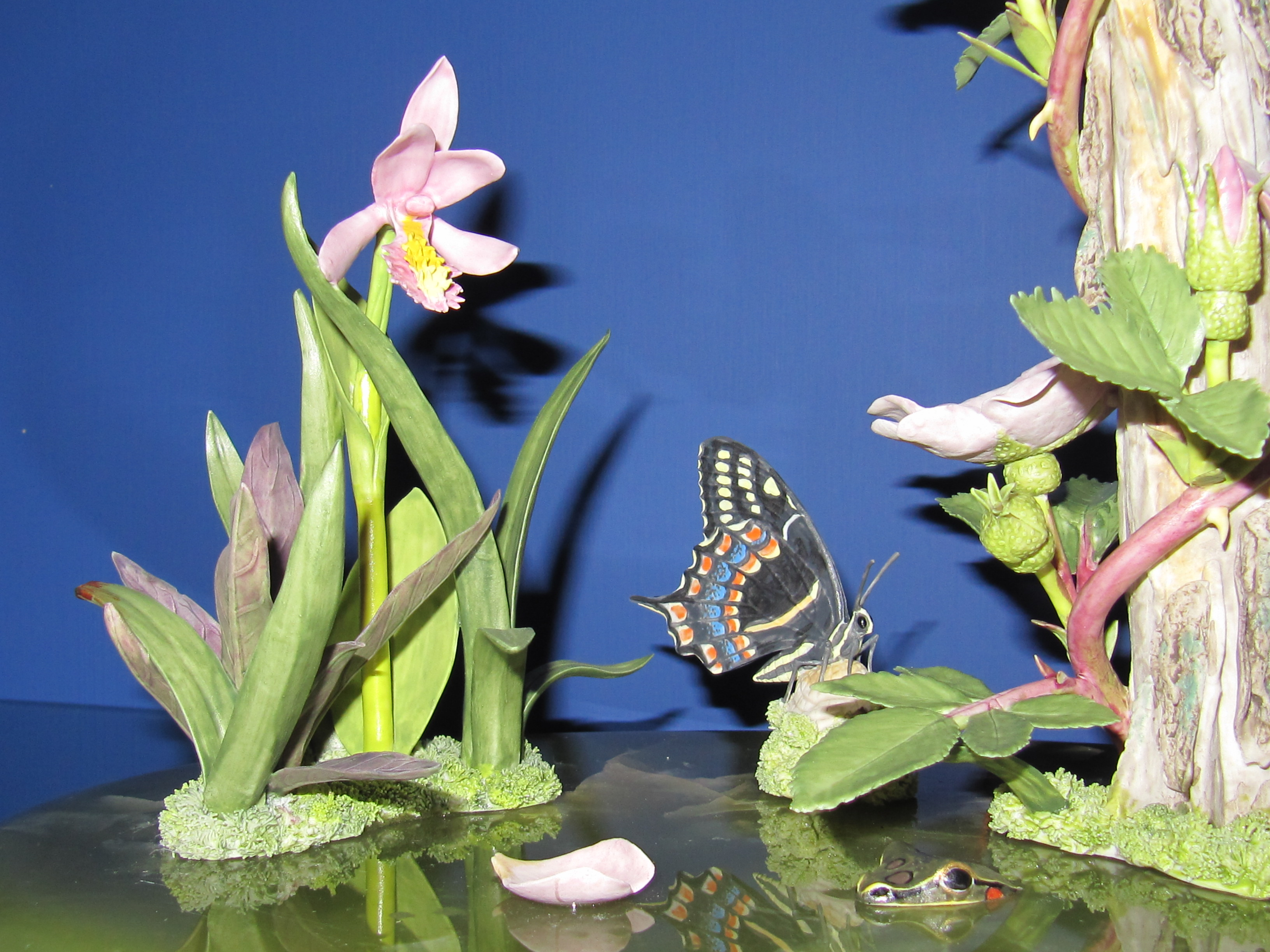
Detail of Sculpture 'The Rose and the Orchid' by Patrick O'Hara

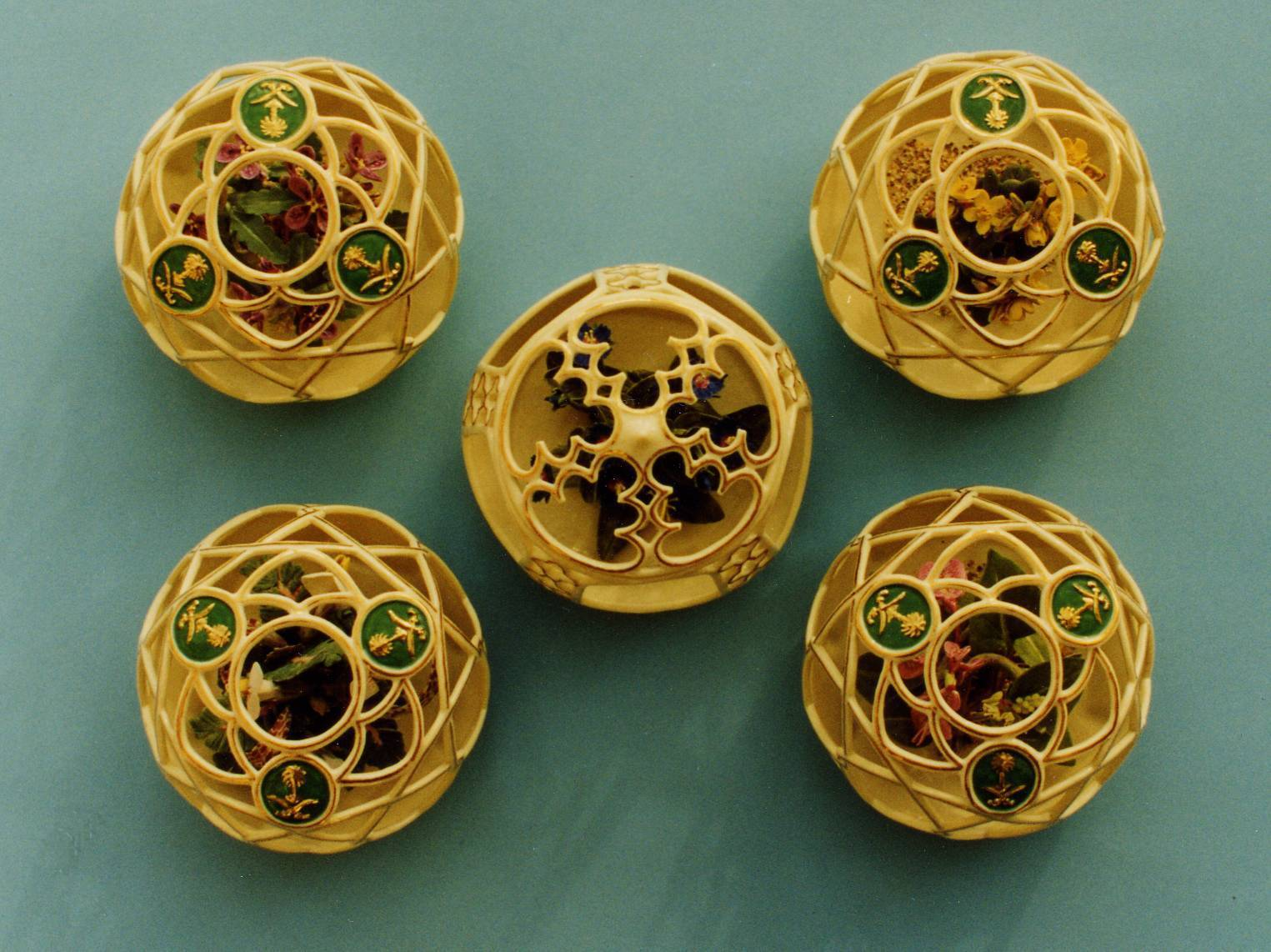
'Secret Garden' Sculptures by Patrick O'Hara in the collection of the Royal Family of Saudi Arabia. Diameter 10 cm each.

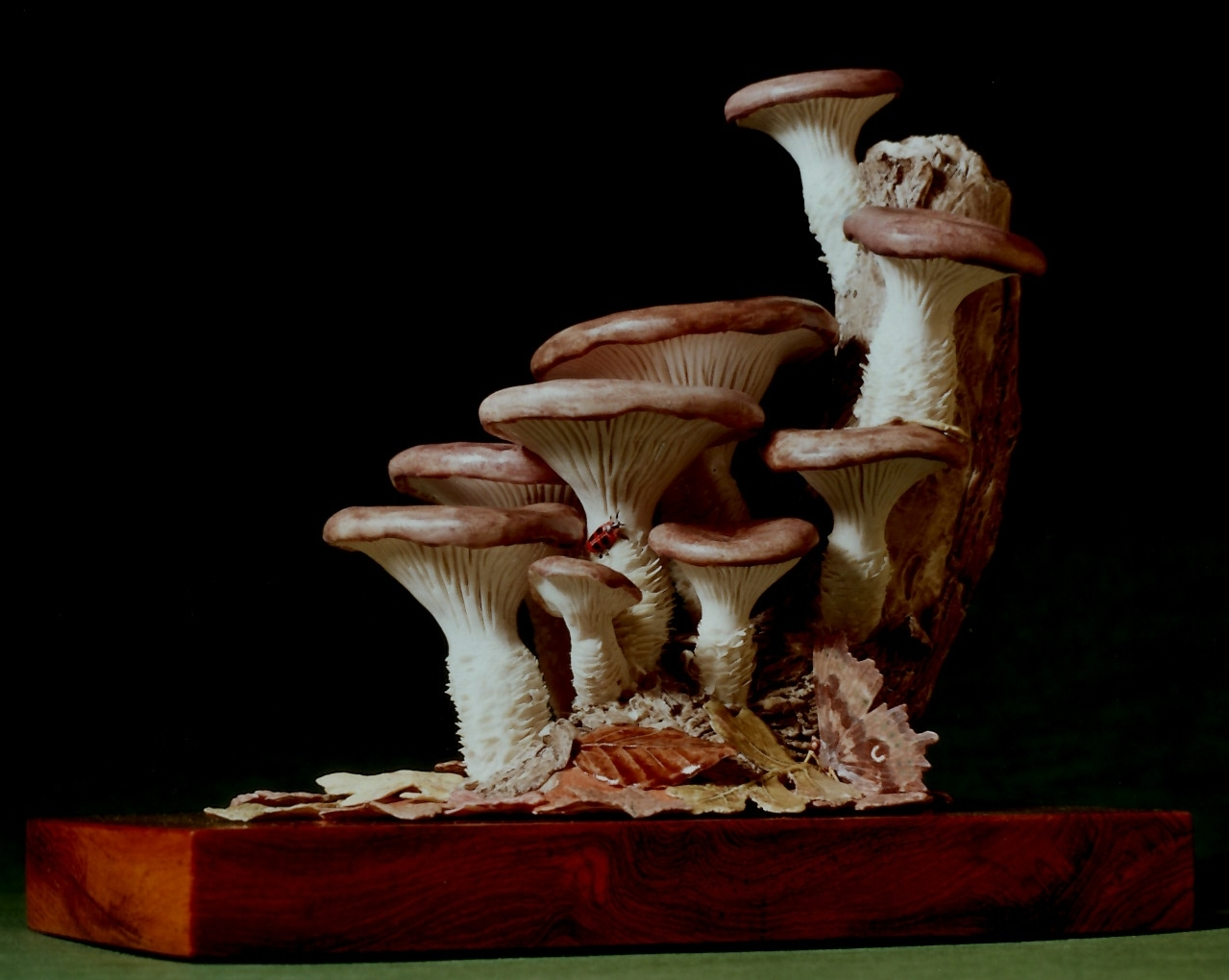
Porcelain Sculpture of Oyster Mushrooms & Comma Butterfly by Patrick O'Hara, created in 1973. Width 15 cm.

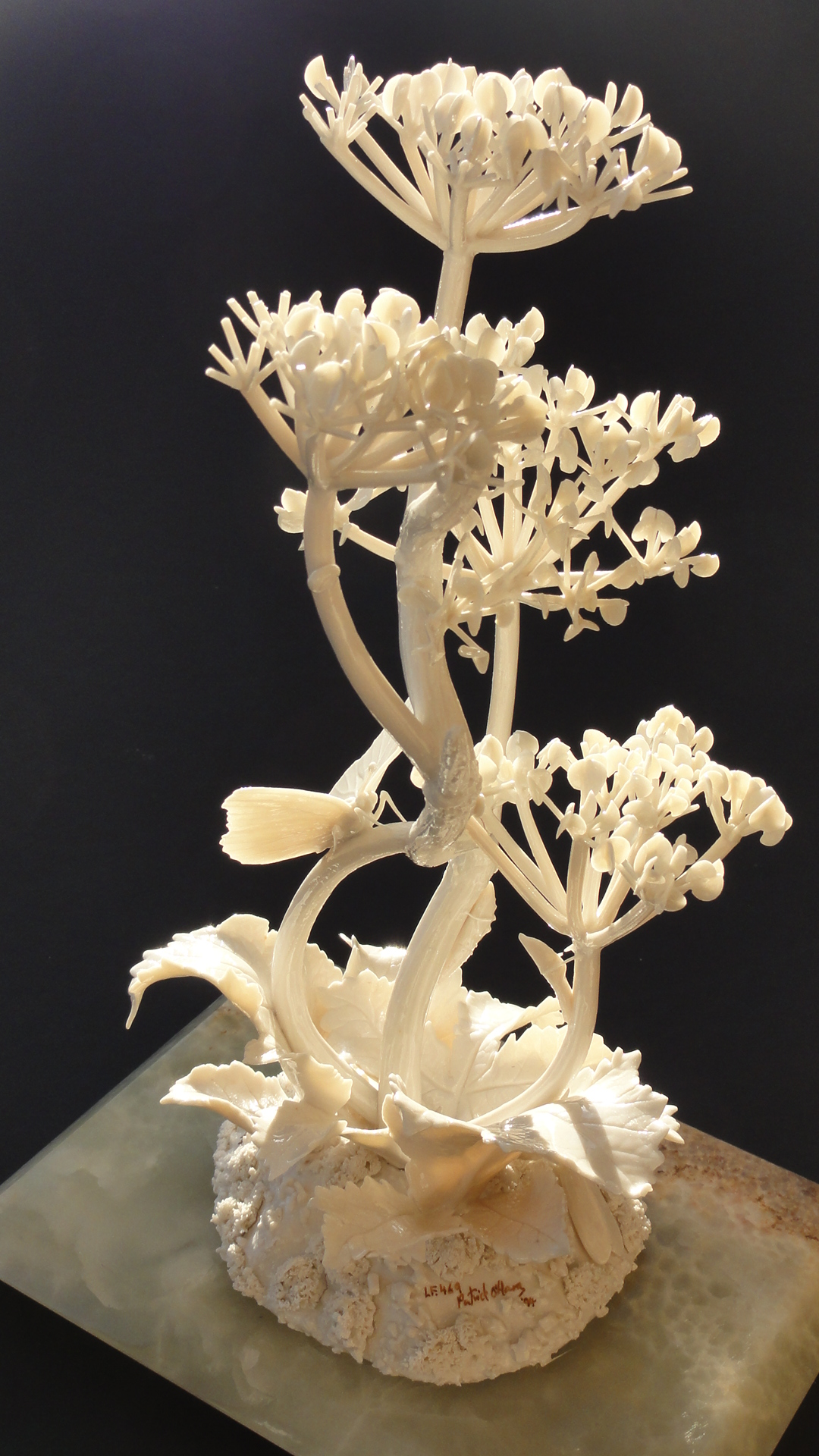
Sculpture of Cow Parsley by Patrick O'Hara after glazing; fully translucent

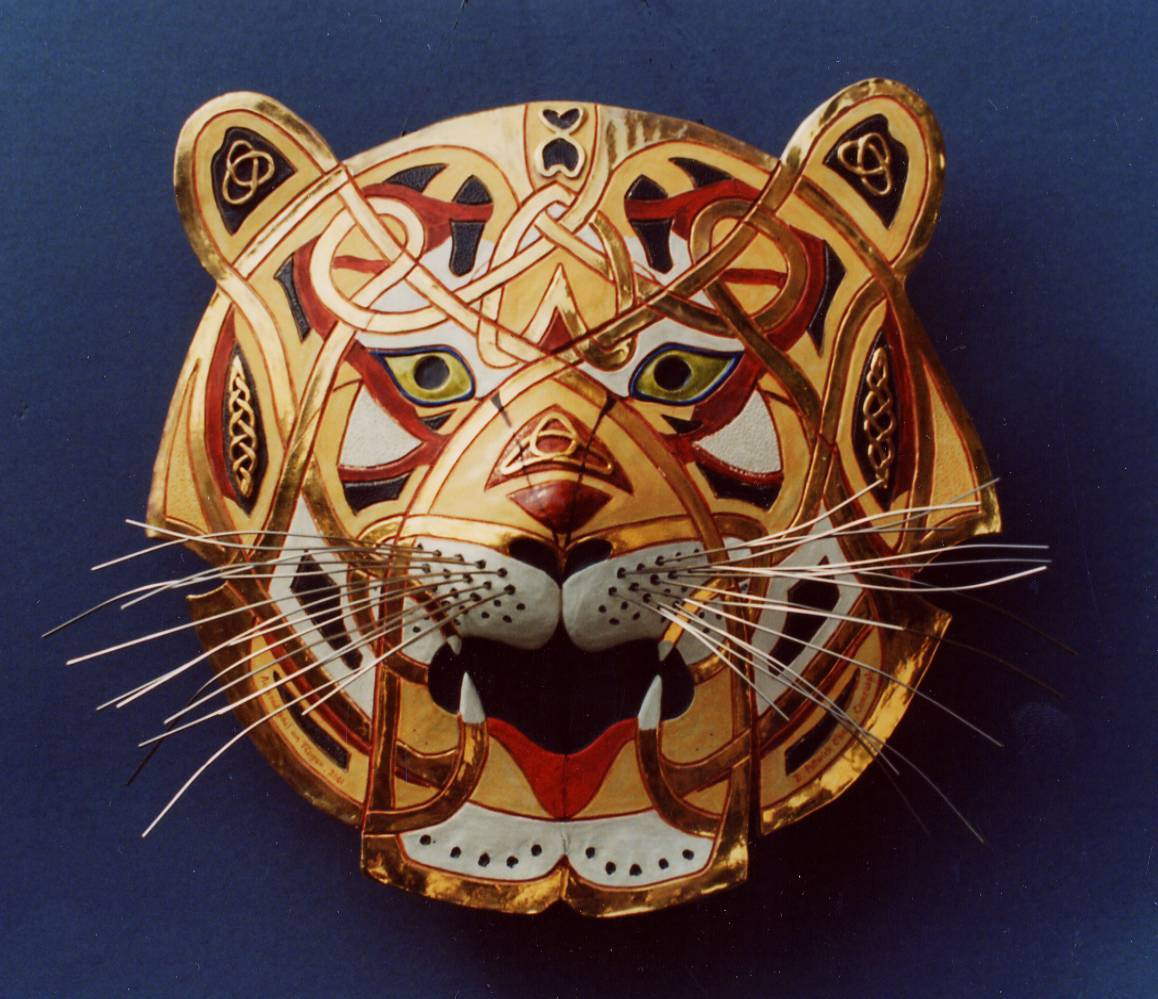
'Celtic Tiger' Stoneware by Patrick O'Hara, 2001. Diameter 60 cm

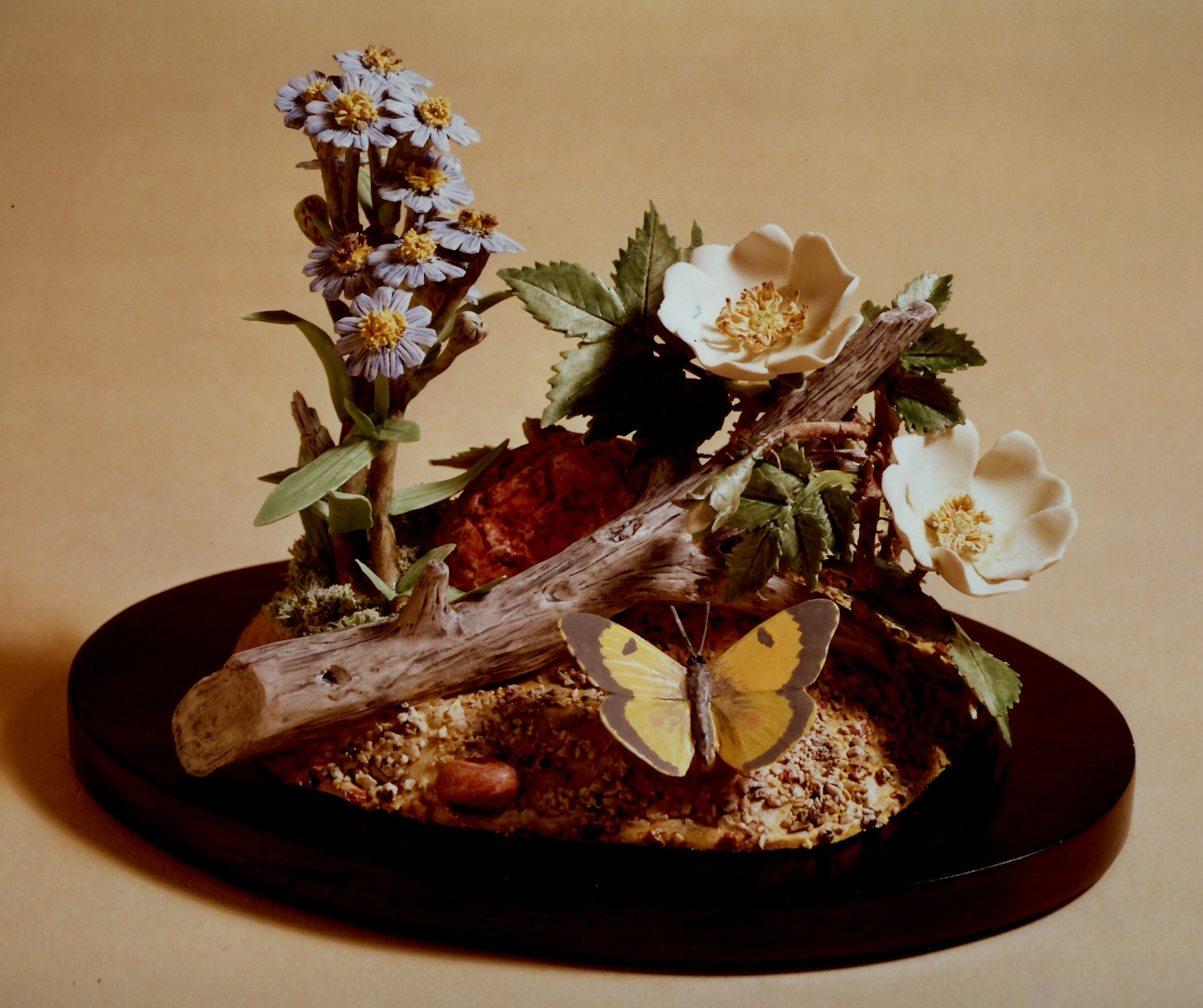
Early Sculpture of Burnet Rose & Sea Aster by Patrick O'Hara 1972

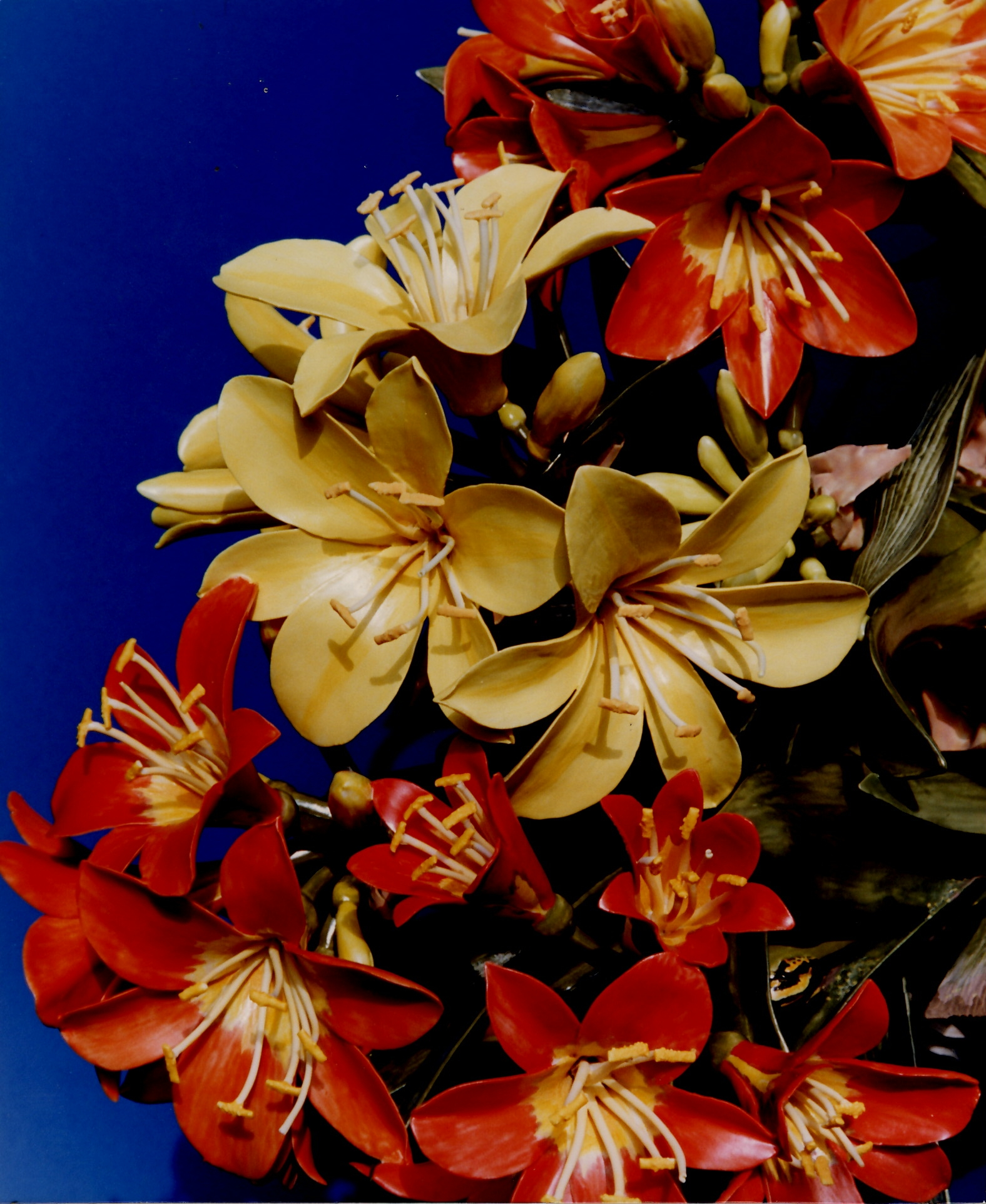
Sculpture of Bush Lily by Patrick O'Hara. Oppenheimer Collection, South Africa, 1991. Height 30 cm

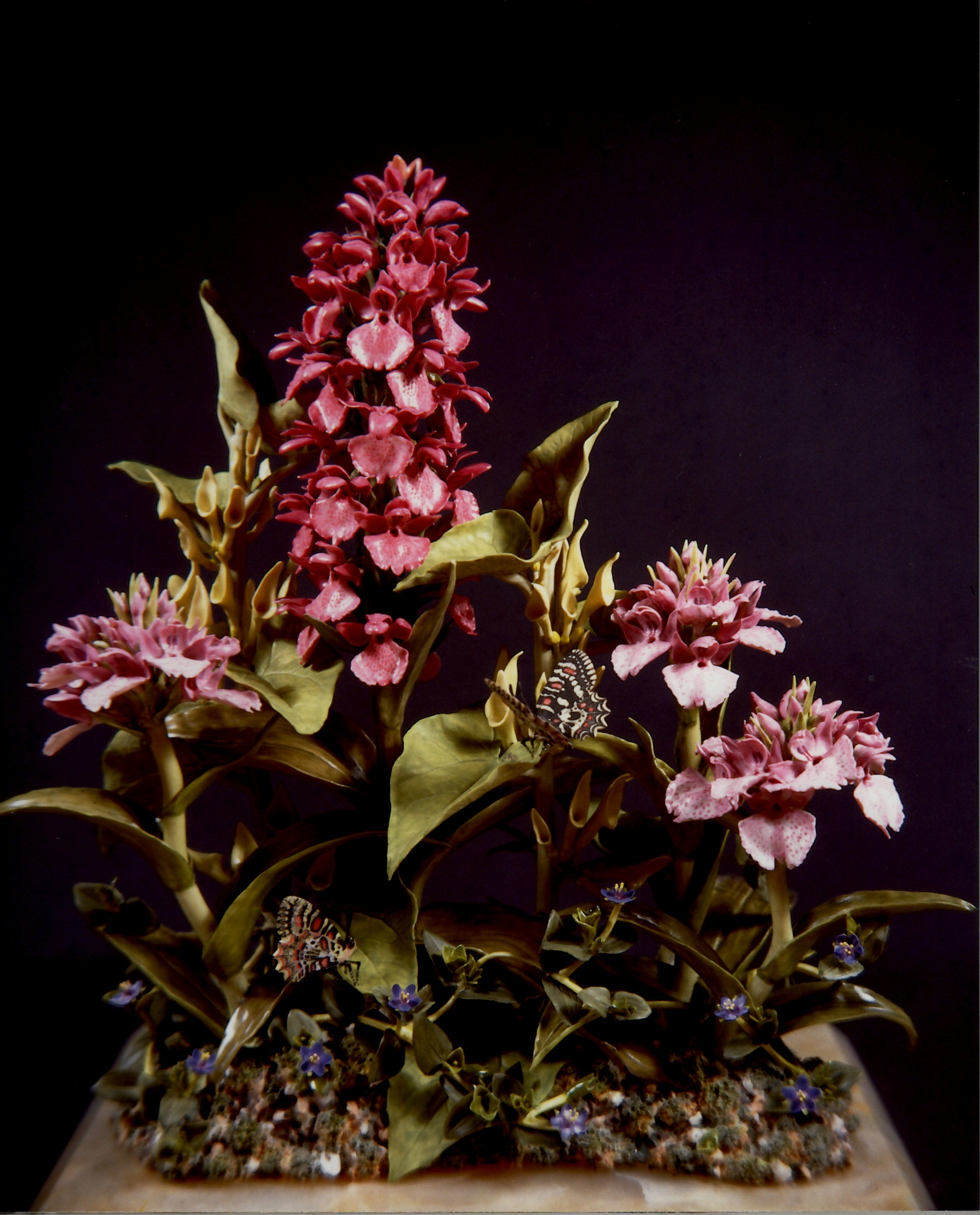
Sculpture of several orchids from Madeira by Patrick O'Hara, created 1984. Height 29 cm

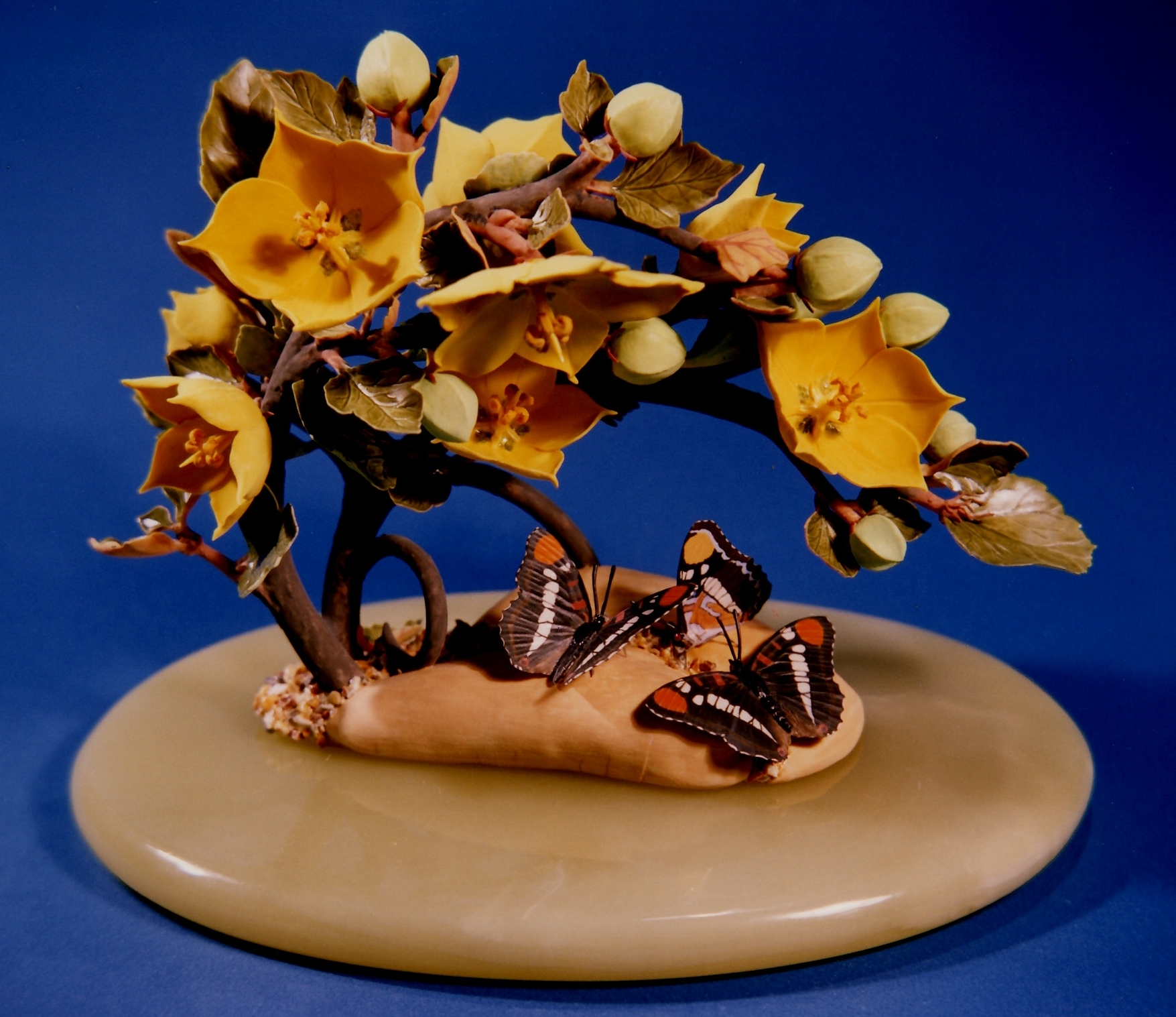
California Sisters & the Lure of Gold by Patrick O'Hara in 1998. Collection of Santa Barbara Botanic Garden, CA, USA.

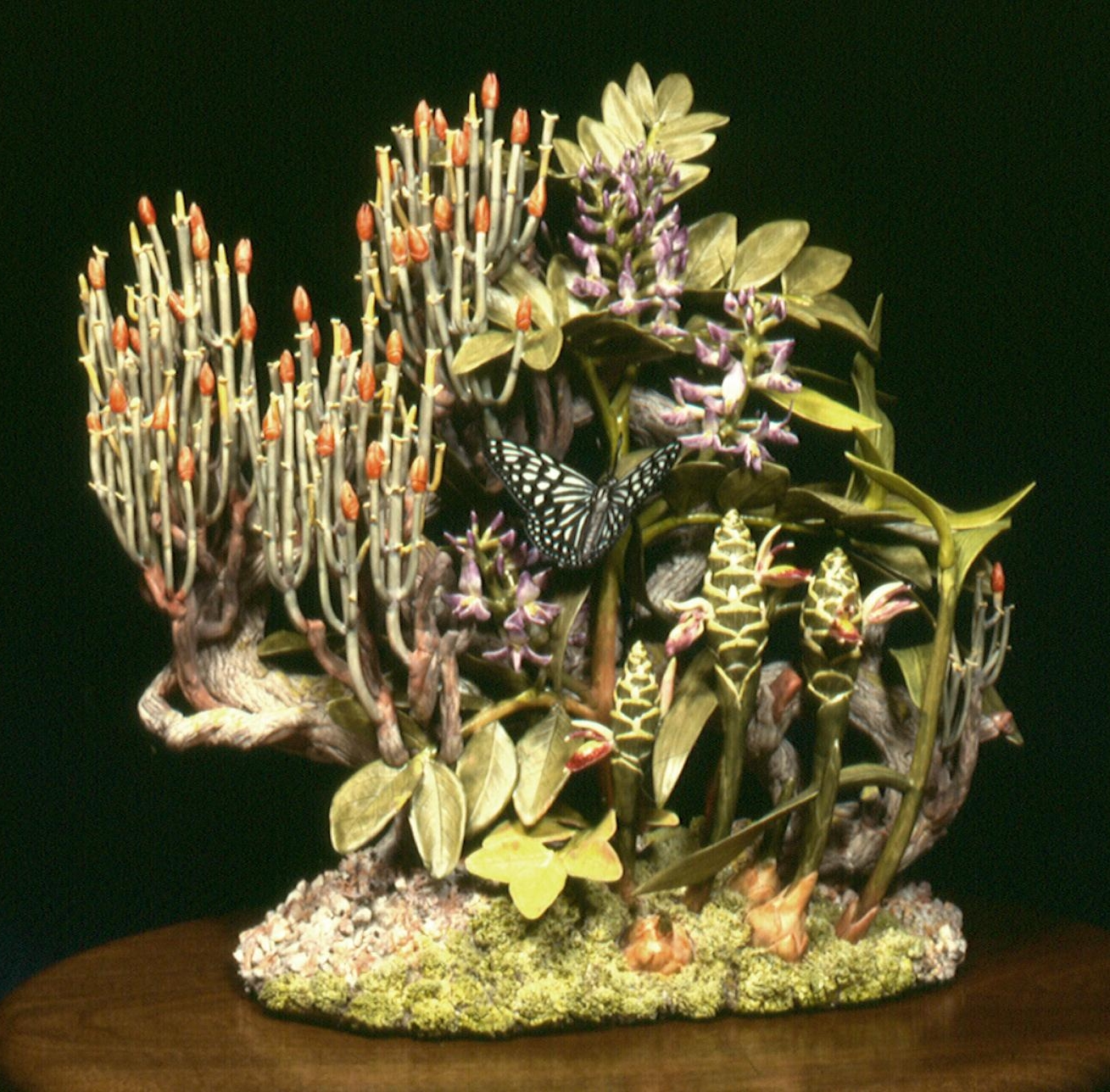
Sculpture of Ginger, Ephedra & Liquorice by Patrick O'Hara in 1990. Height 28 cm. Commission by SmithKline Beecham & Sumitomo Chemical.

== Publications ==
- O'Hara, D. P. (1996, August 27–30). Botanical Sculpture: A Life Saving Alternative? [Paper presentation]. Linnean Society Annual Regional Conference: Systematics and Biological Collections, Belfast, UK.
