= Ohara (surname) =

Ohara is the Romanized Japanese form of two Japanese surnames, Ohara (小原 or 尾原) and Ōhara (大原; also Oohara). Notable people with either surname include:

- Chiaki Ohara, pianist
- Joji Ohara, cinematographer
- Ken Ohara, photographer
- Koson Ohara, painter and printmaker
- Kōyū Ohara, film director
- Michiyoshi Ohara, professional wrestler and mixed martial artist
- Misuzu Ohara, the real name of singer songwriter Amii Ozaki
- Naoshi Ohara (小原 直; 1877–1967), Japanese politician
- Noriko Ohara (1935–2024), voice actress
- Hajime Ōhara, professional wrestler
- Hiroo Ōhara, former Governor of Hiroshima Prefecture, Japan
- Magosaburō Ōhara, businessman and philanthropist
- Mariko Ōhara, science fiction writer
- Noriko Ōhara (born 1943), ballet dancer
- Reiko Ōhara, actress
- Sakurako Ōhara (born 1996), actress and singer
- Sayaka Ōhara, voice actress
- Shōki Ōhara (大原 彰輝; born 1999), Japanese footballer
- Takashi Ōhara, voice actor
- Yuiko Ōhara (大原 ゆい子; born 1992), Japanese singer

== Fictional characters ==
- Lt. Ohara, detective played by Pat Morita in the American television program Ohara (TV series)
- Mari Ohara, fictional character from the media-mix project Love Live! Sunshine!!
- Shota Ohara (大原翔太), a main character from Little Ghost Q-Taro
- Shinichi Ohara, a main character's older brother from Little Ghost Q-Taro
- Yasuka Ohara (大原 寧夏), the original name of main protagonist alias Masane Amaha from Witchblade anime
