= Justice O'Hara =

Justice O'Hara may refer to:

- John J. O'Hara (judge) (1922–1997), associate justice of the Kentucky Supreme Court
- Joseph W. O'Hara (1863–1938), temporary associate justice of the Ohio Supreme Court
- Michael D. O'Hara (1910–1978), associate justice of the Michigan Supreme Court
