= Christopher O'Hare =

American sculptor

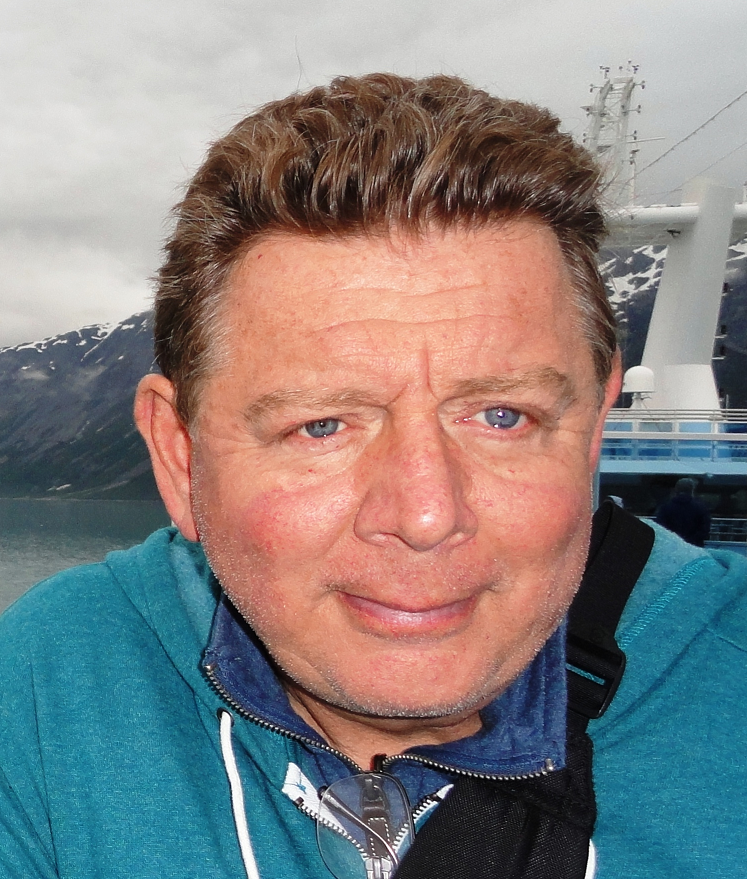
- Occupations: Artist; Sculptor; Inventor; Landscape architect
- Known for: Founder of Pineapple Grove Designs and Reef Cells
- Website: Pineapple Grove Website

Christopher O'Hare is an American artist, sculptor, inventor, and landscape architect based in South Florida. He is the founder of both Pineapple Grove Designs—a producer of ornamental art for architecture—and Reef Cells—a company that designs and deploys artificial, eco-friendly reef structures (some of which memorialize deceased people). Clients of Pineapple Grove Designs include Paul McCartney, the Joint Chiefs of Staff, Gianni Versace, California D.O.T., the Miami Dolphins, and the University of Notre Dame. O'Hare's work is on projects throughout North America and overseas from Okinowa Japan to Dubai UAE.

== Career ==
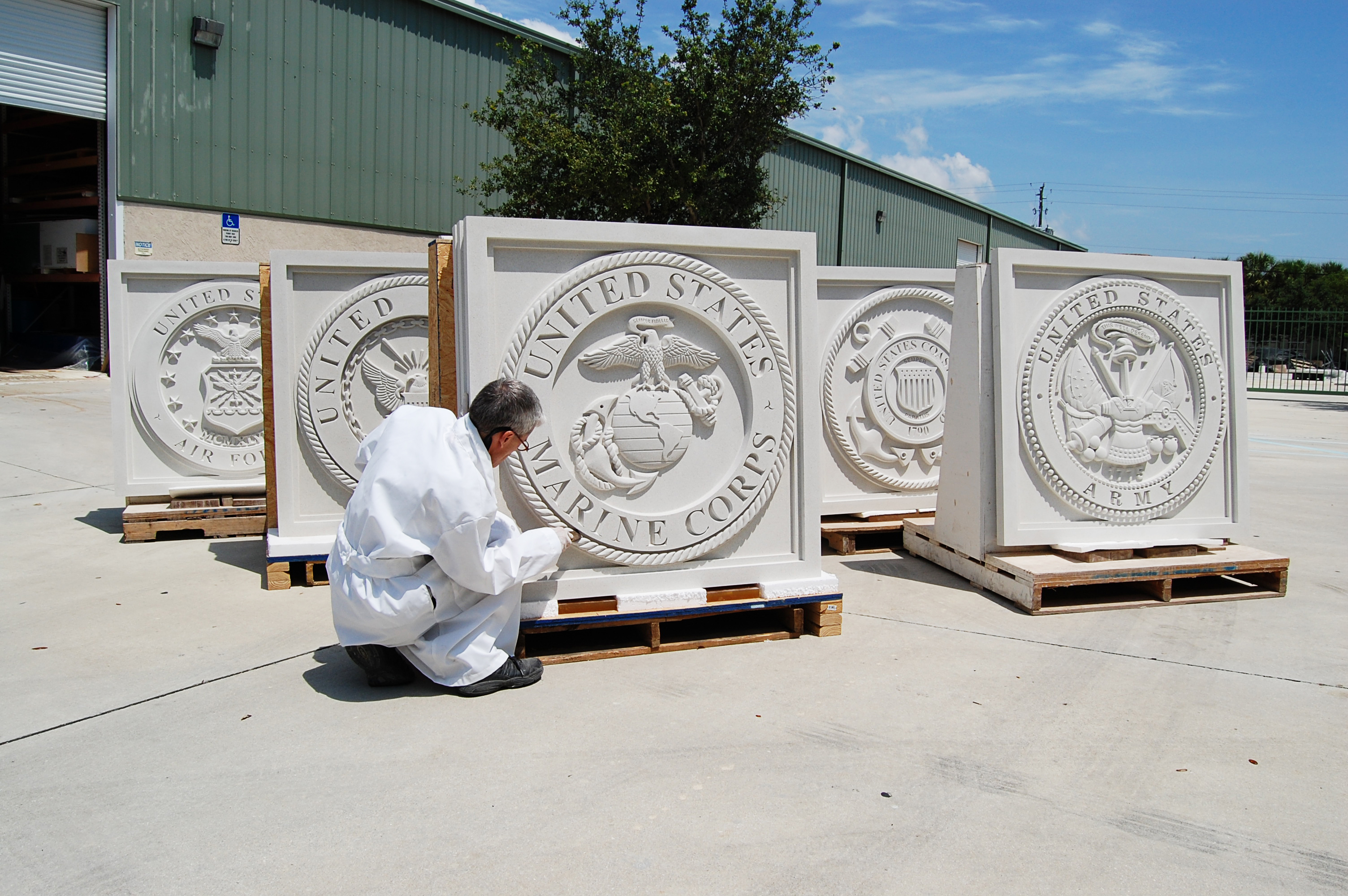
Sculpted panels to honor the U.S. Military readied for California highway project

O'Hare began his career as a landscape architect, designing gardens for residential and resort properties in Miami and Palm Beach. In 1986, O'Hare was a member of the Old School Square Committee and the Beautification Trust Committee for the city of Delray Beach, Florida. The committee was tasked with revitalizing and redeveloping certain sections of the town. In June 1986, he resigned from his post as chairman of the Beautification Committee to focus more on his business. O'Hare continued proposing revitalization developments even after his resignation from the committee.

In 1989, O'Hare founded Pineapple Grove Designs in his garage in Delray Beach. The company now occupies a 50,000 sq ft facility in Boynton Beach, Florida. The company produces numerous stone-sculpted architectural ornamental products. Sculpted products come in a wide range of standard designs including historic, traditional and contemporary imagery. The company also produces custom designs for customers. O'Hare offers all his architectural art, including 3 dimensional sculpture, bas-relief panels, tile, paintings and architectural grilles through Pineapple Grove Designs.

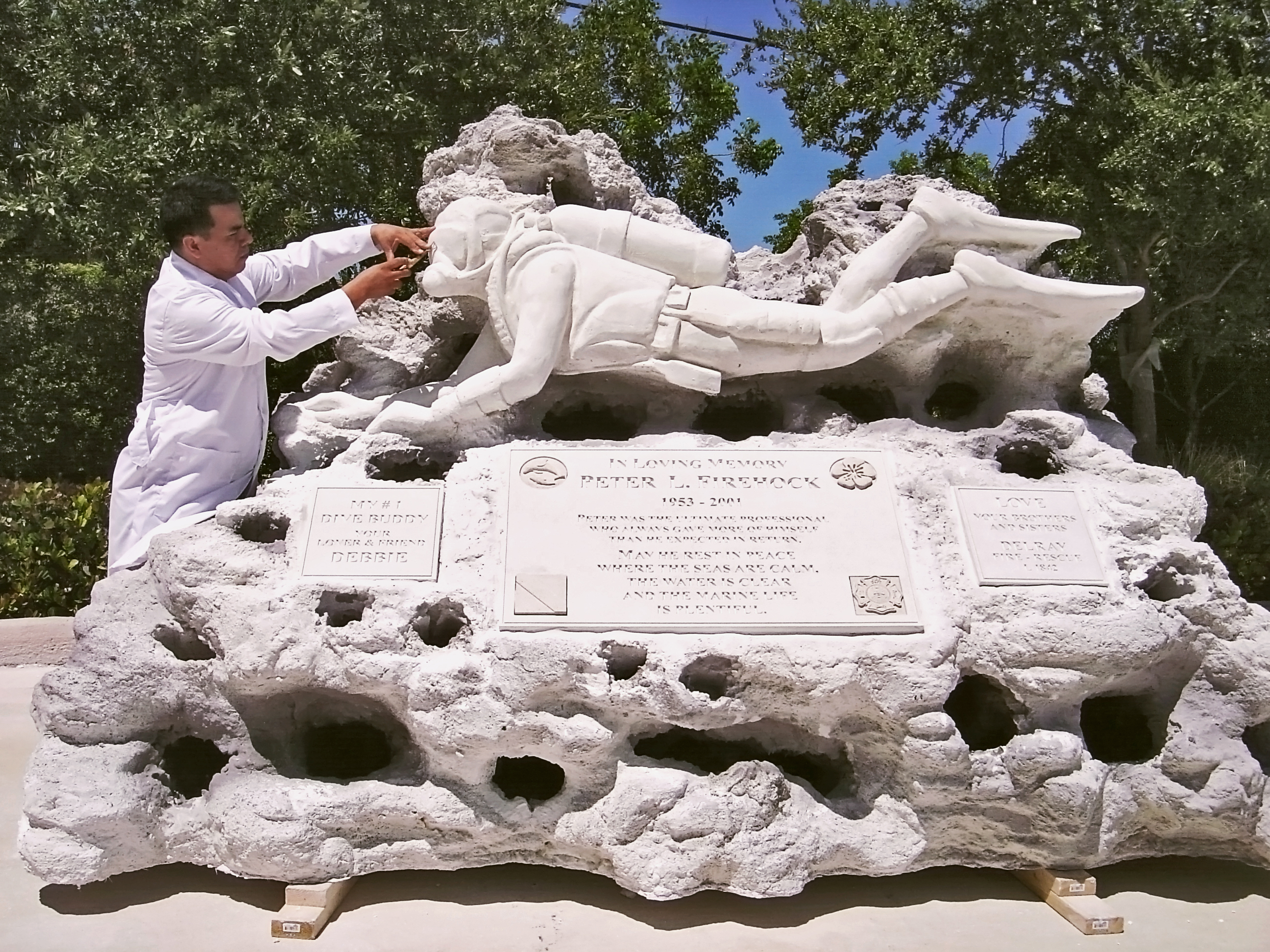
Studio assistant adds finishing touches to O'Hare's Firehock Memorial Reef

In 1996, O'Hare resided in Ocean Ridge, Florida and was elected to the Town Commission. He served on the commission for two years, overseeing projects like the planting of 40,000 plants on beach dunes in the town and the hiring of a new Town Manager. He also donated decorative stone panels for a landscaping project in the city. O'Hare returned to full-time private business when his term expired.

In 2005, O'Hare designed and deployed one of his first artificial reefs. He had previously been granted patents for the design of these artificial reefs in 1997, with additional patents still pending. The reef was donated and deployed in honor of fireman Peter Firehock who had died in December 2001. O'Hare's own father was a New York City firefighter.

The Firehock Reef led to O'Hare founding Reef Cells, a nonprofit subsidiary of Pineapple Grove Designs. Reef Cells are made of a pH neutral Portland and aluminate cement mix and are designed to provide an ideal location for reef-based marine life to thrive. Each reef unit is composed of interconnecting cavities referred to as "cells." O'Hare took on a similar memorialization project in 2015 when he created 40 Reef Cells to memorialize Andrew "Red" Harris. Harris had been killed by a boat while snorkeling in 2014. The reef was deployed in August 2015 in the Jupiter Inlet 3.5 miles off the coast of Jupiter, Florida.

== Patents ==
- U.S. patent 20,030,138,296 Method for assembling artificial reef modular units, filed January 24, 2002; issued July 24, 2003
- U.S. patent 6,189,188 Memorialization of human cremain in artificial reef, filed March 15, 1999; issued February 20, 2001
- U.S. patent 5,669,330 Aquatic organism habitat device, filed June 7, 1995; issued September 23, 1997
