= Harry Fusao O'Hara =

Japanese military aviator

Harry Fusao O'Hara MM
- Born: 1891; Tokyo
- Died: 1951 (aged 59–60); Hampstead, London, England
- Education: Waseda University (dropped out)
- Spouse: Muriel M. McDonald (m. September 1919)
- Children: Geraldine Reedijk (daughter)
- Military career
- Allegiance: United Kingdom
- Branch: British Indian Army, British Army, Royal Flying Corps
- Service years: 1915–1919
- Units: 34th Royal Sikh Pioneers; 5th Battalion, Middlesex Regiment; No. 1 Squadron RAF
- Conflicts: First World War
- Awards: Military Medal (1917)
- Other work: Journalist

Harry Fusao O'Hara MM (1891, Tokyo – 1951, Hampstead, London) was a Japanese man who fought for the British in the First World War, first as an infantryman, later as the first and, as far as is known, only Japanese pilot in the Royal Flying Corps. He was also a journalist.

== Early life and education ==
Born in Tokyo, he attended Waseda University, but dropped out and traveled to India, where he worked as a journalist for Japanese newspapers.

== Military career ==
After the First World War broke out, he enlisted on 13 December 1915. According to his youngest daughter, Geraldine Reedijk, a sergeant wrote down his last name as "O'Hara" over his objections. He was assigned to the 34th Royal Sikh Pioneers infantry regiment of the British Indian Army, which served on the Western Front. When the unit was transferred to Mesopotamia, O'Hara ended his brief stint with the unit and joined the 5th Battalion, Middlesex Regiment, of the British Army as a private on 24 December. He ended up in hospital three times in 1916: first for influenza (6–10 January) and twice for wounds received while on duty (7 August and October). On 6 January 1917, he was awarded the Military Medal.

He transferred to the Royal Flying Corps as an Air Mechanic, 2nd Class. He trained at the Royal Provincial Flying School, Edgware, and upon becoming a pilot, he was promoted to sergeant, on 8 October 1917. In 1918, he was assigned to No. 1 Squadron RAF, fighting in France. On 7 June 1918, he was hospitalised again, this time for a gunshot wound to the jaw. The war ended on 11 November 1918, and he left the RFC sometime in 1919.

== Personal life ==
In September, he married Englishwoman Muriel M. McDonald. The O'Haras lived in London after the war. When the UK declared war on Japan in December 1941, following Japanese attacks on British possessions in the Far East, he became an enemy alien; his daughter, however, does not recall him being interned.

== Death ==
Harry Fusao O'Hara died in 1951 in Hampstead.
