= Daphnis and Chloe =

Ancient Greek novel by Longus

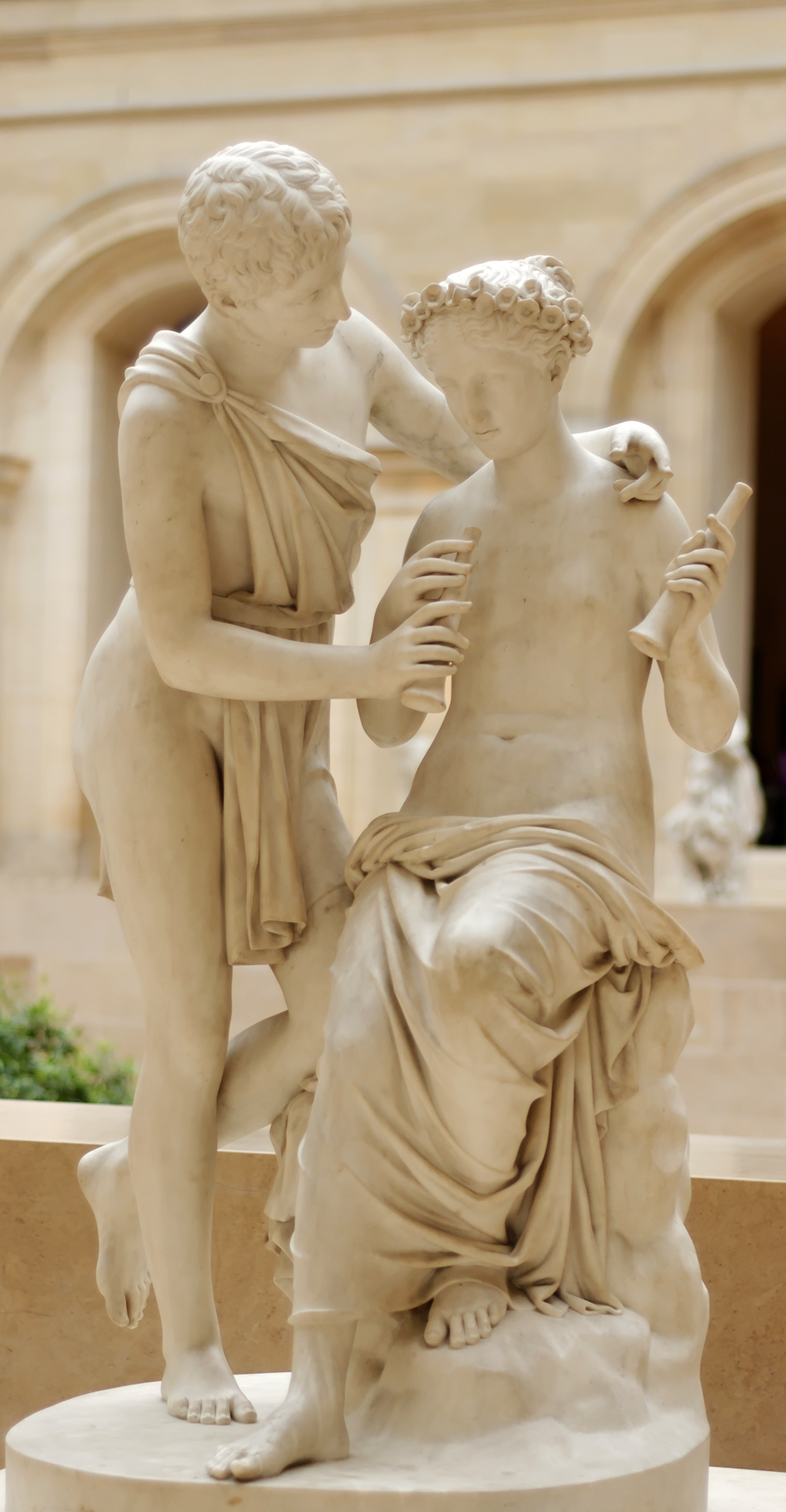
Daphnis and Chloe by Jean-Pierre Cortot

Daphnis and Chloe (Greek: Δάφνις καὶ Χλόη, Daphnis kai Chloē) is a Greek pastoral story written during the Roman Empire, the only known work of second-century Hellenistic romance writer Longus.

== Setting and style ==
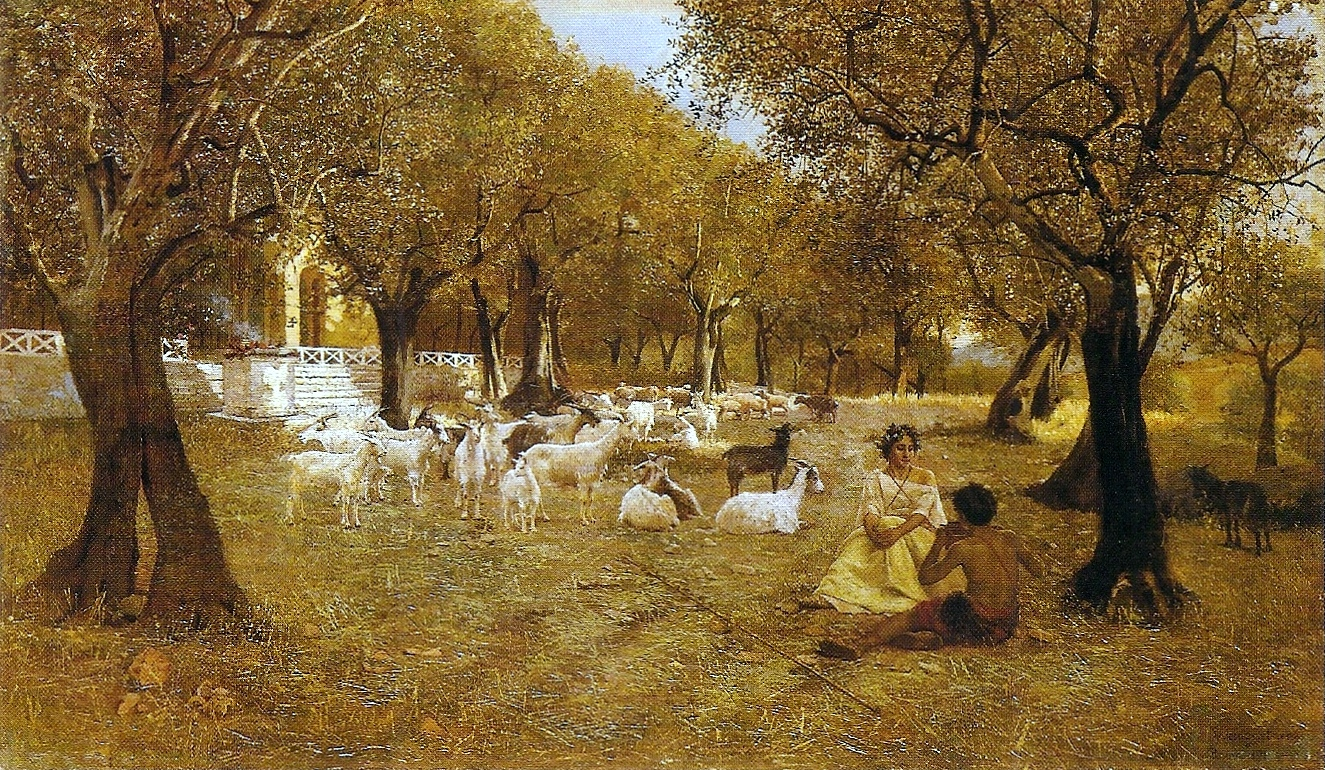
Pedro Weingärtner, Brazilian, 1891

It is set on the Greek isle of Lesbos, where scholars assume the author to have lived. Its style is rhetorical and pastoral; its shepherds and shepherdesses are wholly conventional, but the author imparts human interest to this idealized world. Daphnis and Chloe resembles a modern novel more than does its chief rival among Greek erotic romances, the Aethiopica of Heliodorus, which is remarkable more for its plot than for its characterization.

== Plot summary ==
Daphnis and Chloe is the story of a boy (Daphnis) and a girl (Chloe), each of whom is abandoned at birth along with some identifying tokens. A goatherd named Lamon discovers Daphnis, and a shepherd called Dryas finds Chloe. Each decides to raise the child he finds as his own. Daphnis and Chloe grow up together, herding the flocks for their foster parents. They fall in love but, being naïve, do not understand what is happening to them. Philetas, a wise old cowherd, explains to them what love is and tells them that the only cure is kissing. They do this. Eventually, Lycaenion, a woman from the city, educates Daphnis in love-making. Daphnis, however, decides not to test his newly acquired skill on Chloe, because Lycaenion tells Daphnis that Chloe "will scream and cry and lie bleeding heavily [as if murdered]." Throughout the book, Chloe is courted by suitors, two of whom (Dorcon and Lampis) attempt with varying degrees of success to abduct her. She is also carried off by raiders from a nearby city and saved by the intervention of the god Pan. Meanwhile, Daphnis falls into a pit, gets beaten up, is abducted by pirates, and is very nearly raped by a drunkard. In the end, after being recognised by their birth parents, Daphnis and Chloe get married and live out their lives in the country.

== Characters ==
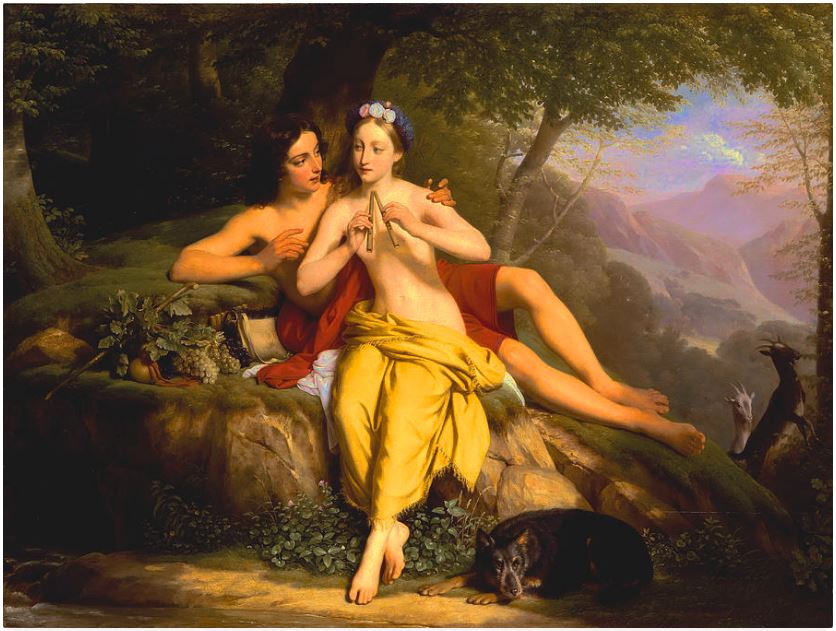
Daphnis et Chloe, oil on canvas by Louise Marie-Jeanne Hersent-Mauduit

The characters include:

- Astylus – Dionysophanes' son
- Chloe – the heroine
- Daphnis – the hero
- Dionysophanes – Daphnis' master and father
- Dorcon – the would-be suitor of Chloe
- Dryas – Chloe's foster father
- Eros – god of love
- Eudromus – a messenger
- Gnathon – the would-be suitor of Daphnis
- Lamon – Daphnis' foster father
- Lampis – a cow-herder
- Lycaenion – woman who educates Daphnis in love-making
- Megacles – Chloe's father
- Myrtale – Daphnis' foster mother
- Nape – Chloe's foster mother
- Pan – god of shepherds and the wild
- Philetas – old countryman who advises the heroes about love; likely named after Philitas of Cos
- Rhode – Chloe's mother

== Text tradition ==
Until the beginning of the nineteenth century, about a page of text was missing; when Paul Louis Courier went to Italy, he found the missing part in one of the plutei (an ancient Roman reading desk or place for storing manuscripts) of the Biblioteca Laurenziana in Florence. However, as soon as he had copied the text, he upset the ink-stand and spilled ink all over the manuscript. The Italian philologists were incensed, especially those who had studied the pluteus giving "a most exact description" (un'esattissima notizia) of it.

== Influences and adaptations ==
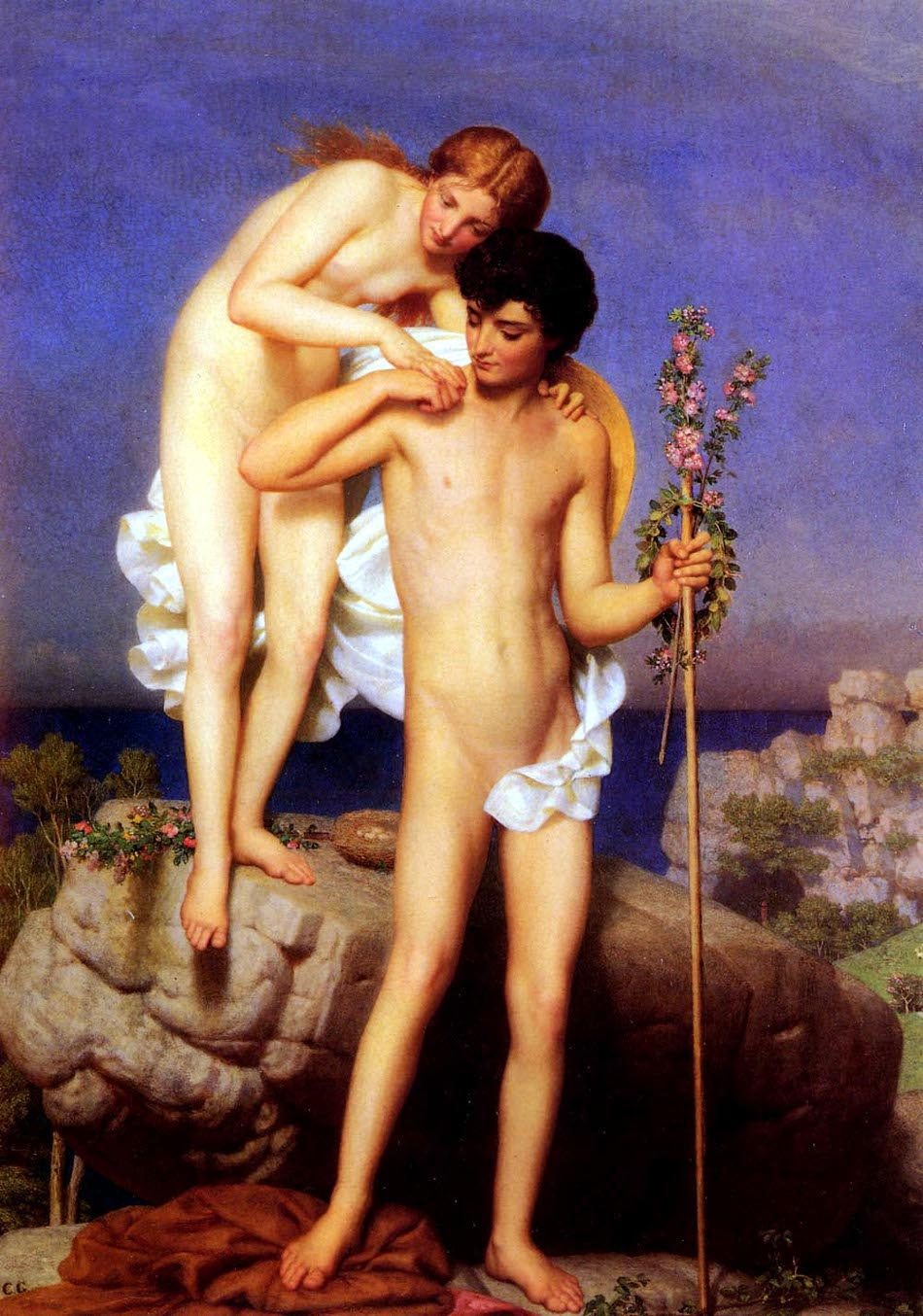
A nineteenth-century painting by the Swiss-French painter Marc Gabriel Charles Gleyre depicting a scene from Daphnis and Chloe

The first vernacular edition of Daphnis and Chloe was the French version of Jacques Amyot, published in 1559. Along with the Diana of Jorge de Montemayor (published in the same year), Daphnis and Chloe helped inaugurate a European vogue for pastoral fiction in the sixteenth and seventeenth centuries. Daphnis and Chloe was the model of La Sireine of Honoré d'Urfé, the Aminta of Torquato Tasso, and The Gentle Shepherd of Allan Ramsay. The novel Paul et Virginie by Jacques-Henri Bernardin de Saint-Pierre echoes the same story.

Jacques Amyot's French translation is perhaps better known than the original. The story has been presented in numerous illustrated editions, including a 1937 limited edition with woodcuts by Aristide Maillol, and a 1977 edition illustrated by Marc Chagall. Another translation that rivals the original is that of Annibale Caro, one of those writers dearest to lovers of the Tuscan elegances.

The 1952 work Shiosai (The Sound of Waves), written by the Japanese writer Yukio Mishima following a visit to Greece, is considered to have been inspired by the Daphnis and Chloe myth. Another work based on it is the 1923 novel Le Blé en herbe by Colette.

Canadian writer Colin McAdam’s 2026 novel Daphnis and Chloe is a modern retelling of the story. It was longlisted for the 2026 Giller Prize and is a 2026 CIBA Booksellers’ List Selection.

=== Opera ===
- Joseph Bodin de Boismortier wrote a Daphnis et Chloé pastorale in 3 acts in 1747
- Jean-Jacques Rousseau worked on but did not finish a pastorale heroïque under the same title between 1774 and 1776
- Jacques Offenbach in 1860 completed a one-act operetta based on the ancient novel

=== Ballet ===
- Maurice Ravel wrote what he called a symphonie chorégraphique bearing the title Daphnis et Chloé in 1912 for Sergei Diaghilev's Ballets Russes; its choreographer that year was Michel Fokine; at nearly sixty minutes, it is the composer's longest work, and two orchestral suites from it are regularly played
- Ravel's work was choreographed by Frederick Ashton for a staging by Sadler's Wells Ballet (now The Royal Ballet) at Covent Garden on 5 April 1951, with Margot Fonteyn as Chloe and Michael Somes as Daphnis; decor was by John Craxton
- John Neumeier choreographed the Ravel for his Frankfurt Ballet company
- Jean-Christophe Maillot in 2010 created a contemporary and sensual choreography of 35 minutes of the Ravel for Les Ballets de Monte-Carlo; this featured Jeroen Verbruggen as Daphnis, Anjara Ballesteros-Cilla as Chloe, Bernice Coppieters as Lycenion and Chris Roelandt as Dorcon, directed by Denis Caïozzi and produced by Telmondis and Mezzo; it premiered on April 1, 2010, at the Grimaldi Forum in Monaco and has since been broadcast internationally

=== Art ===
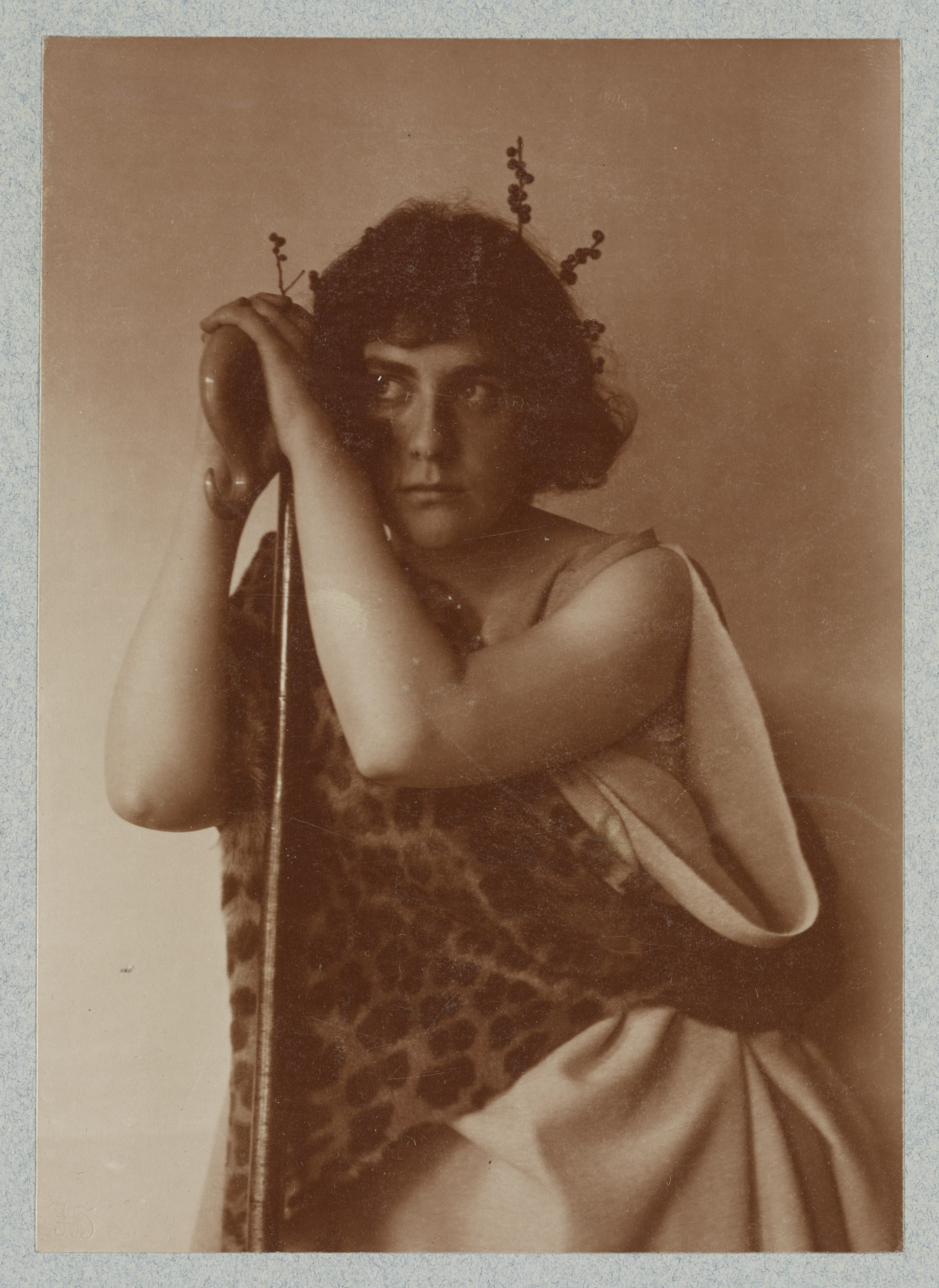
Photographic print by F. Holland Day of Ethel Reed in costume as Chloe (c. 1895–98).

- Marc Chagall produced a series of 42 color lithographs based on the tale of Daphnis and Chloe.
- Aristide Maillol (1861-1944) published a portfolio titled Daphnis et Chloe (1937) which features 49 woodcuts illustrating the story.

=== Cinema ===
- The work was adapted into a 64-minute silent film by Orestis Laskos in 1931, one of the first Greek cinema classics. The movie was originally considered shocking due to the nudity in some of the scenes.
- The story was the basis for the 1963 film Μικρές Αφροδίτες (Mikres Afrodites), or Young Aphrodites, by the Greek filmmaker Nikos Koundouros, based on a script of Vassilis Vassilikos.
- The story was adapted into a movie in 1993 by the Russian filmmaker Yuri Kuzmenko. It starred Lyubov Polishchuk as Daphnis' biological mother.

=== Radio ===
The work was adapted into a 45-minute radio play in 2006 by Hattie Naylor.

== Gallery ==
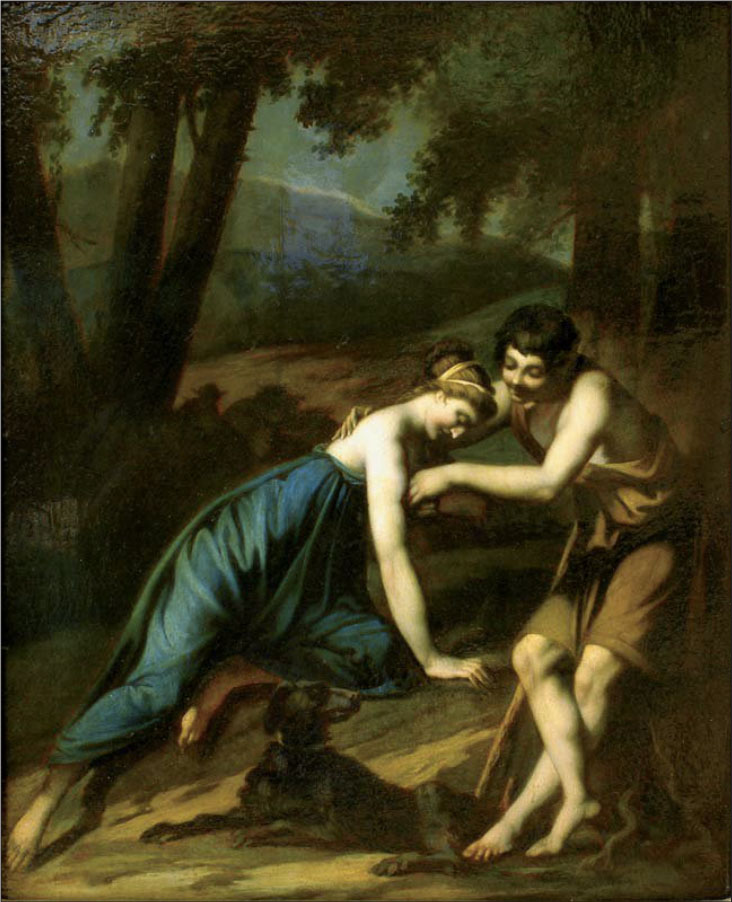
Daphnis et Chloé by Pierre-Paul Prud'hon, 1808

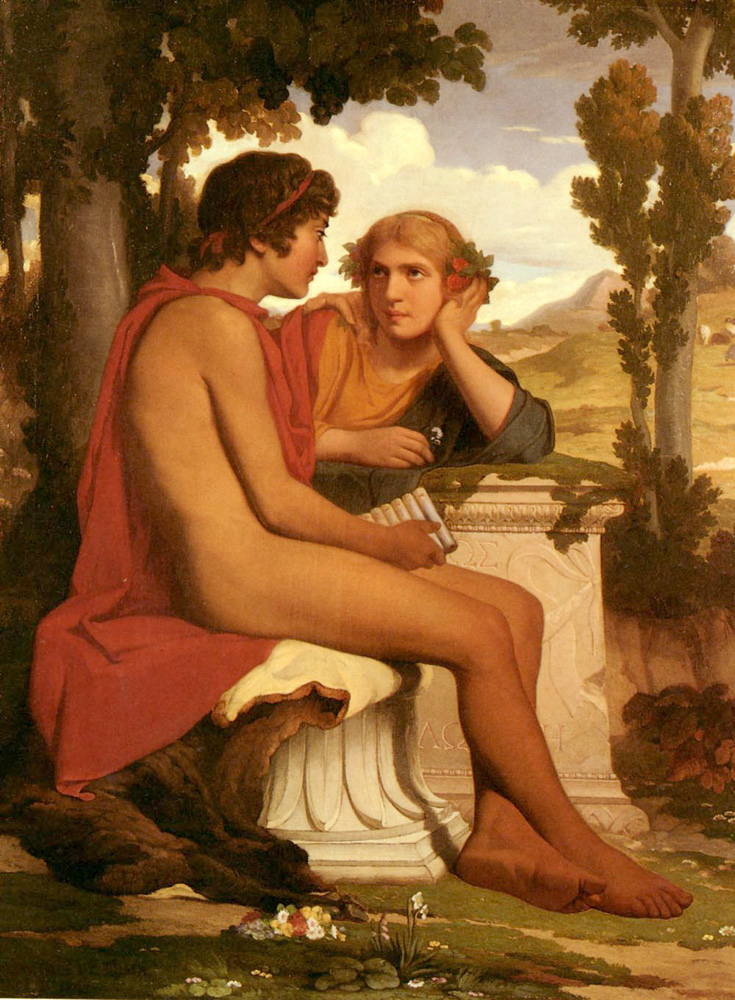
Daphné et Chloé by Dominique Louis Papety, 1848

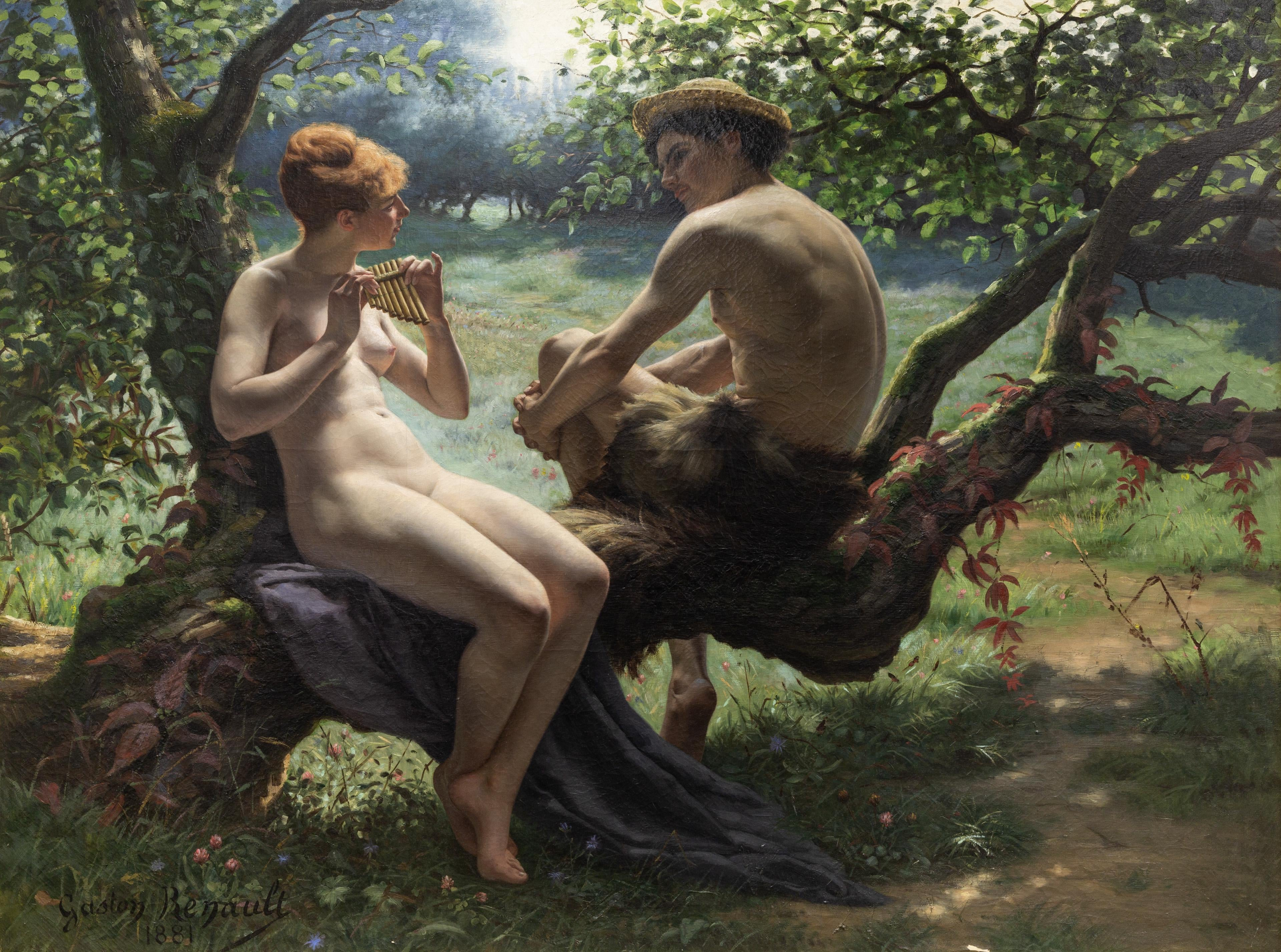
Daphnis and Chloe by Gaston Renault, 1881

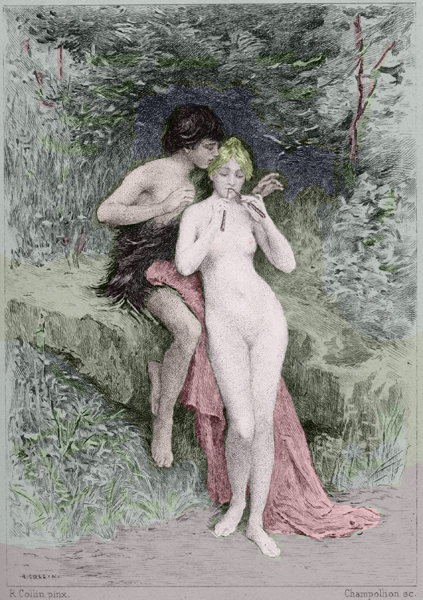
Raphael Collin, 1890 cover

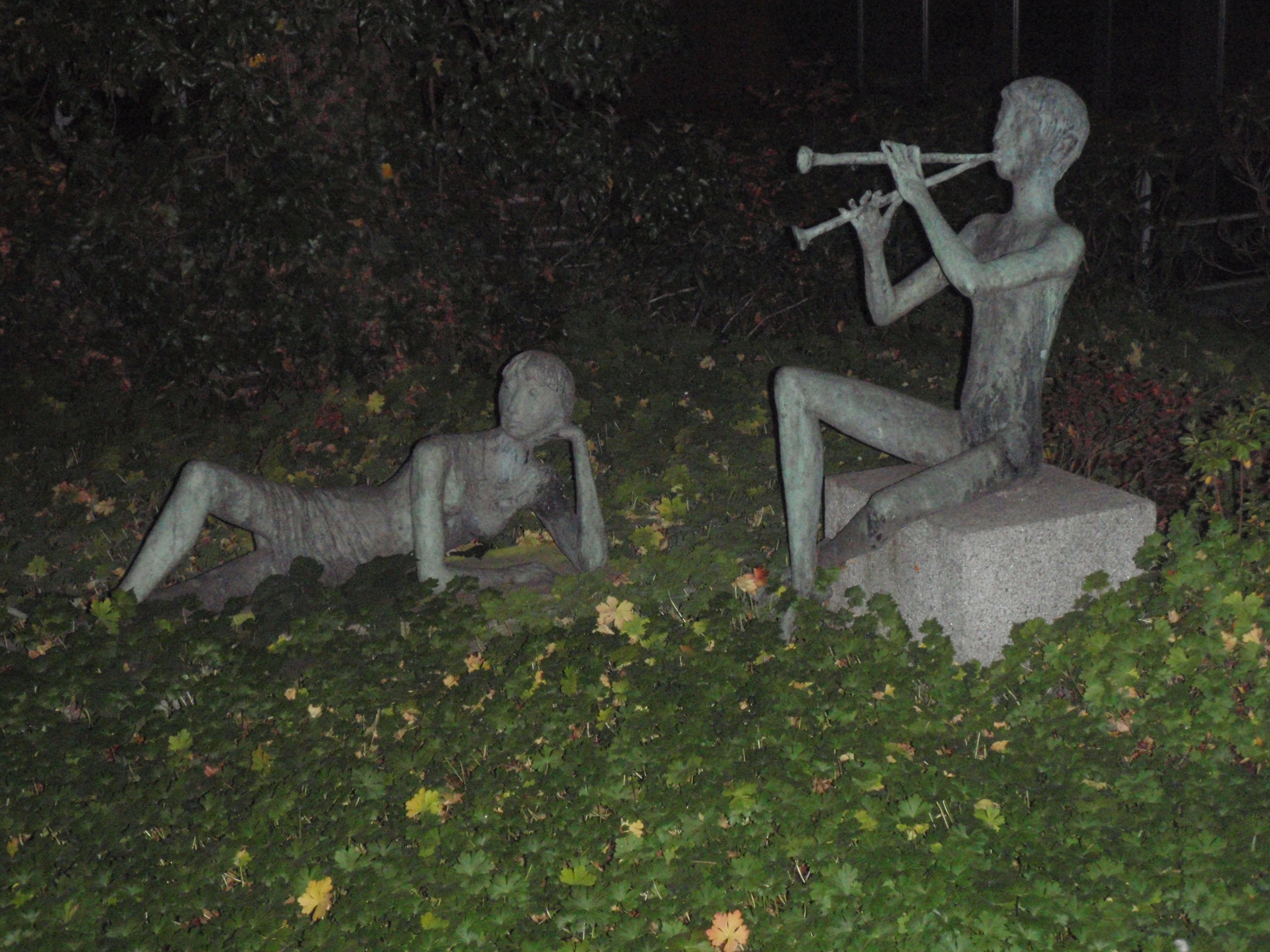
Daphnis und Chloe, 1958 statue by Ursula Querner at Hamburg-Altona, Germany

== See also ==
Other ancient Greek novelists:

- Chariton: The Loves of Chaereas and Callirhoe
- Xenophon of Ephesus: The Ephesian Tale
- Achilles Tatius: Leucippe and Clitophon
- Heliodorus of Emesa: The Aethiopica

== Bibliography ==
=== Manuscripts ===
- F or A: Florentinus Laurentianus Conventi Soppressi 627 (XIII) — complete, discovered at Florence by P. L. Courier in 1809.
- V or B: Vaticanus Graecus 1348 (XVI) — mostly complete; the lacuna comprises chapters 12 to 17 of the first book.
- O: Olomucensis M 79 (XV) — gnomic passages.

=== Editions ===
- Columbani, Raphael; Henry Cuffe and Marcello Adriani (1598). Longi Pastoralium, de Daphnide & Chloë libri quatuor. Juntine Edition. Florence: Apud Philippum Iunctam. — The editio princeps.
- Mitscherlich, Christoph Wilhelm (1794). Longi Pastoralium de Daphnide et Chloe Libri IV Graece et Latine. Scriptores erotici Graeci III. Bipontine Edition. — With Latin translation.
- Courier, Paul Louis (1810). — Contained a previously unknown passage (the great lacuna, comprising chapters 12 to 17 of the first book), after the discovery of MS. F (above).
- Courier, Paul Louis (1829). Longi Pastoralia. Paris. — First complete Greek text of Daphnis and Chloe, edited by P.-L. Courier, with a Latin translation by G. R. Ludwig de Sinner.
- Seiler, Schaefer (1843). Longi Pastoralia. Leipzig: Boissonade & Brunck. — Greek text of Daphnis and Chloe with a Latin translation.
- Hirschig, G. A. (1856). Erotici Scriptores. Paris, 1856. — Greek text with Latin translation, pp. 174–222.
- Longus, Literally and Completely Translated from the Greek. The Athenian Society IV. Athens: Privately printed. 1896. — With English translation.
- Edmonds, John Maxwell (1916). Daphnis & Chloe, by Longus; The Love Romances of Parthenius and Other Fragments. Loeb Classical Library 69. Cambridge, Massachusetts: Harvard University Press. ISBN 0-674-99076-5. — With English translation revised from that of George Thornley.
- Dalmeyda, Georges (1971) [1934]. Pastorales (Daphnis et Chloe) / Longus. Collection des universités de France. Paris: Belles Lettres. — With French translation.
- Vieillefond, Jean-René (1987). Pastorales (Daphnis et Chloé) / Longus. Collection des universités de France. Paris: Belles Lettres. — With French translation.
- Reeve, Michael D. (1994) [1982]. Daphnis et Chloe / Longus. Bibliotheca scriptorum Graecorum et Romanorum Teubneriana (Editio correctior ed.). Stuttgart: Teubner. ISBN 3-8154-1932-8. — Reeve's text is reprinted with the translation and commentary by Morgan (see below).
- Henderson, Jeffrey (2009). Longus: Daphnis and Chloe / Xenophon of Ephesus: Anthia and Habrocomes. Loeb Classical Library 69 (new ed.). Cambridge, MA: Harvard University Press. ISBN 978-0-674-99633-5. — Side-by-side Greek text and English translation.

=== Commentaries ===
- Morgan, J[ohn] R. (see below).
- Bowie, Ewen L. (intr., ed., comm.), Longos Daphnis and Chloe (Cambridge Greek and Latin Classics), Cambridge: Cambridge University Press, 2019. ISBN 978-0-521-77220-4.

=== Translations ===
- Annibale Caro, Amori pastorali di Dafni e Cloe (Parma, 1784, but written before 1538) — into Italian
- Jacques Amyot, Les Pastorales ou Daphnis et Chloé (Paris, 1559); revised by Paul Louis Courier (1810) — into French

==== English translations ====
- Daye, Angell (1587). Daphnis and Chloe. London: Robert Waldegrave. Reprinted and edited by Joseph Jacobs (London, 1890).
- Thornley, George (1657). Daphnis and Chloe: A Most Sweet, and Pleasant Pastorall Romance for Young Ladies. Archived from the original on 2011-05-17. — A revised version is printed with Edmonds's text (see above).
- Craggs, James (1764). The Pastoral Amours of Daphnis and Chloe.
- Le Grice, C. V. (1803). Daphnis and Chloe: A Pastoral Novel. — Published anonymously, with omissions
- Daphnis and Chloe: A Pastoral Romance. London: Vizetelly & Co. 1890. — Anonymous revision of Le Grice.
- Smith, Rowland (1848). The Greek Romances of Heliodorus, Longus and Achilles Tatius. Bohn's Classical Library. London.
- Lowe, W. D. (1908). The Story of Daphnis and Chloe. Cambridge: Deighton Bell & Co.
- Moore, George (1924). The Pastoral Loves of Daphnis and Chloe. London: William Heinemann.
- Hadas, Moses (1953). Three Greek Romances. Indianapolis: Bobbs-Merrill. ISBN 978-0-672-60442-3.
- Turner, Paul (1989) [1956]. Longus: Daphnis and Chloe. Penguin Classics. Harmondsworth: Penguin. ISBN 978-0-14-044059-1.
- Gill, Christopher (1989). "Longus: Daphnis and Chloe". In Bryan P. Reardon (ed.). Collected Ancient Greek Novels. Berkeley, California: University of California Press. pp. 285–348. ISBN 978-0-520-04306-0.
- McCail, Ronald (2002). Daphnis and Chloe. Oxford World's Classics. Oxford: Oxford University Press. ISBN 978-0-19-284052-3.
- Morgan, J. R. (2004). Longus: Daphnis and Chloe. Aris and Phillips Classical Texts. Oxford: Oxbow Books. ISBN 978-0-85668-562-0. — With reprint of Reeve's text and a commentary.
- Tyrrell, Wm. Blake (n.d.). "Daphnis and Chloe: A Novel by Longus". University of North Carolina Wilmington. Archived from the original on 5 February 2016.
- Humphreys, Nigel (2015). The Love Song of Daphnis and Chloe. Circaidy Gregory Press. ISBN 978-1-906451-88-2. — In the form of an epic poem.
