= Bernice Coppieters =

Belgian ballet dancer

- Born: 18 November 1970 (age 55); Dendermonde, Belgium
- Education: Antwerp Institute of Ballet
- Occupations: ballet dancer; ballet master
- Career
- Current group: Les Ballets de Monte Carlo
- Former groups: Royal Ballet of Flanders

Bernice Coppieters (born 18 November 1970) is a Belgian retired ballet dancer and ballet master. She danced as an étoile at Les Ballets de Monte Carlo and is a long time collaborator of Jean-Christophe Maillot. She is now the principal ballet master at the company and has staged Maillot's productions worldwide.

== Biography ==
Born in Dendermonde, Belgium, Coppieters started training at the Antwerp Institute of Ballet in 1980. She join Royal Ballet of Flanders, where she became a soloist. She joined the Ballets de Monte-Carlo in 1991, and began a creative relationship with Jean-Christophe Maillot, which lasted almost 30 years. She was named étoile of the company by Caroline, Princess of Hanover in 1995. Coppieters became the principal ballet master in 2015. She has staged Maillot's productions in Sweden, Germany, Austria, South Korea, U.S., Czech Republic and Belgium.

"As a dancer you are an interpreter, you need to give your body like an object to a choreographer and say, 'Voilà, I am yours, do with me as you want.'"

== Created roles by Maillot ==
Coppieters originated more than 40 roles in Maillot's productions, including:

- Juliet in Romeo and Juliet
- The Fairy Godmother and Wicked Stepmother in Cinderella
- Meier in the Drosselmeier couple in Casse-Noisette Circus
- Beauty in La Belle
- Titania in Le Songe
- Death in Faust
- Princess Sheherazade in Sheherazade
- Her Majesty the Night in LAC

== Awards and honours ==
- 1988: Prix de Lausanne
- 1995: Appointed Danseuse Etoile of the Ballets de Monte-Carlo by H.R.H. the Princess of Hanover
- 2002: Officier de l'Ordre du Mérite Culturel of the Principality of Monaco
- 2003: Positano "Léonide Massine" Award
- 2005: Étoile of the year award by Premio Danza at Danza
- 2011: Prix Benois de la Danse for the title role in Sheherazade
- 2015: Officer of the Order of Cultural Merit.
