= Prix de Lausanne =

International dance competition

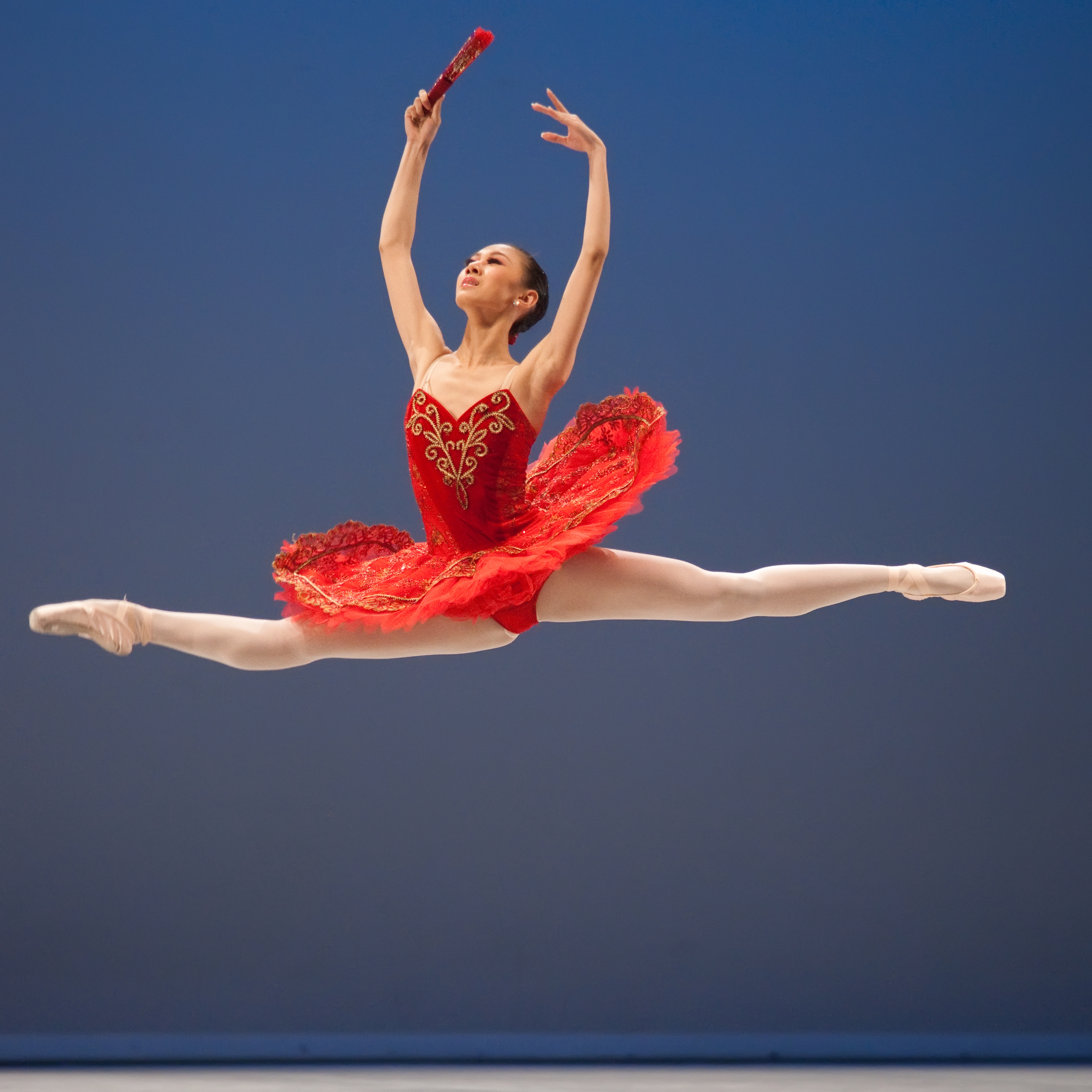
A dancer at the Prix de Lausanne 2010

The Prix de Lausanne (French: [pʁi də lozan]) is an international dance competition held annually in Lausanne, Switzerland. The competition is for young dancers seeking to pursue a professional career in classical ballet, and many former prize winners of the competition are now leading stars with major ballet companies around the world. The competition is managed by a non-profit foundation organised by the Fondation en faveur de l'Art chorégraphique and is maintained by various sponsors, patrons and donors.

== History ==
Prix de Lausanne was founded in 1973 by the Swiss industrialist Philippe Braunschweig and his wife Elvire. Philippe, although not a dancer, became interested in dance as a young man. His Russian dancer wife developed his interest further.

The Braunschweigs created the competition after noticing the lack of financial support for young dance students, particularly those from small regional schools, wishing to attend professional level programs.

He started by approaching Rosella Hightower and Maurice Béjart who drew up the rules for the competition.

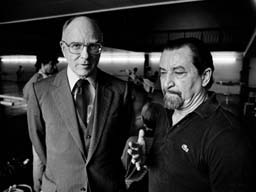
Philippe Braunschweig and Maurice Béjart in 1988

In recent years, the competition has seen increase in Asian candidates. Due t the demand by Japanese students to study abroad, an additional office was set up in Japan.

The Braunschweigs announced their retirement from running the competition at the end of the Prix in 1996. In March 1997, the 25th anniversary of the competition, the philanthropists handed over the Prix's direction to an executive committee. It was composed of the Swiss Secretary of State, Franz Blankart, and an artistic committee headed by Jan Nuyts, who worked with the Prix for many years. Mr Charles Gebhard is in charge of finances and Ms Patricia Leroy heads the actual organization. The Braunschweigs remained available as consultants and managed to maintain the original mission of the competition.

== Entry ==
Entry to the competition is reserved for young student-dancers, aged 15 through 18, who have not yet been in professional employment and is open to candidates of all nationalities.

Currently, participants are required to submit a 15–20 minute digital file recording, showing them performing a combination of barre and centre-work exercises in a studio environment, and pay a registration fee in CHF. Those candidates selected to participate in the competition must pay an additional participation fee in CHF.

Around 80 candidates from 30 or so countries compete each year, in the hope of being selected for the final, which is reserved for the best 20 among them. The final of the competition is broadcast live on television.

Since 2007, the Prix de Lausanne has been part of an exchange program with the prestigious Youth America Grand Prix, which allows dancers from each competition to benefit from both of these organizations' scholarship opportunities. Thanks to a mutual agreement, finalists who have not received a scholarship at one of the competitions, will be eligible to participate in the other, without having to pass the selective rounds.

== Location ==
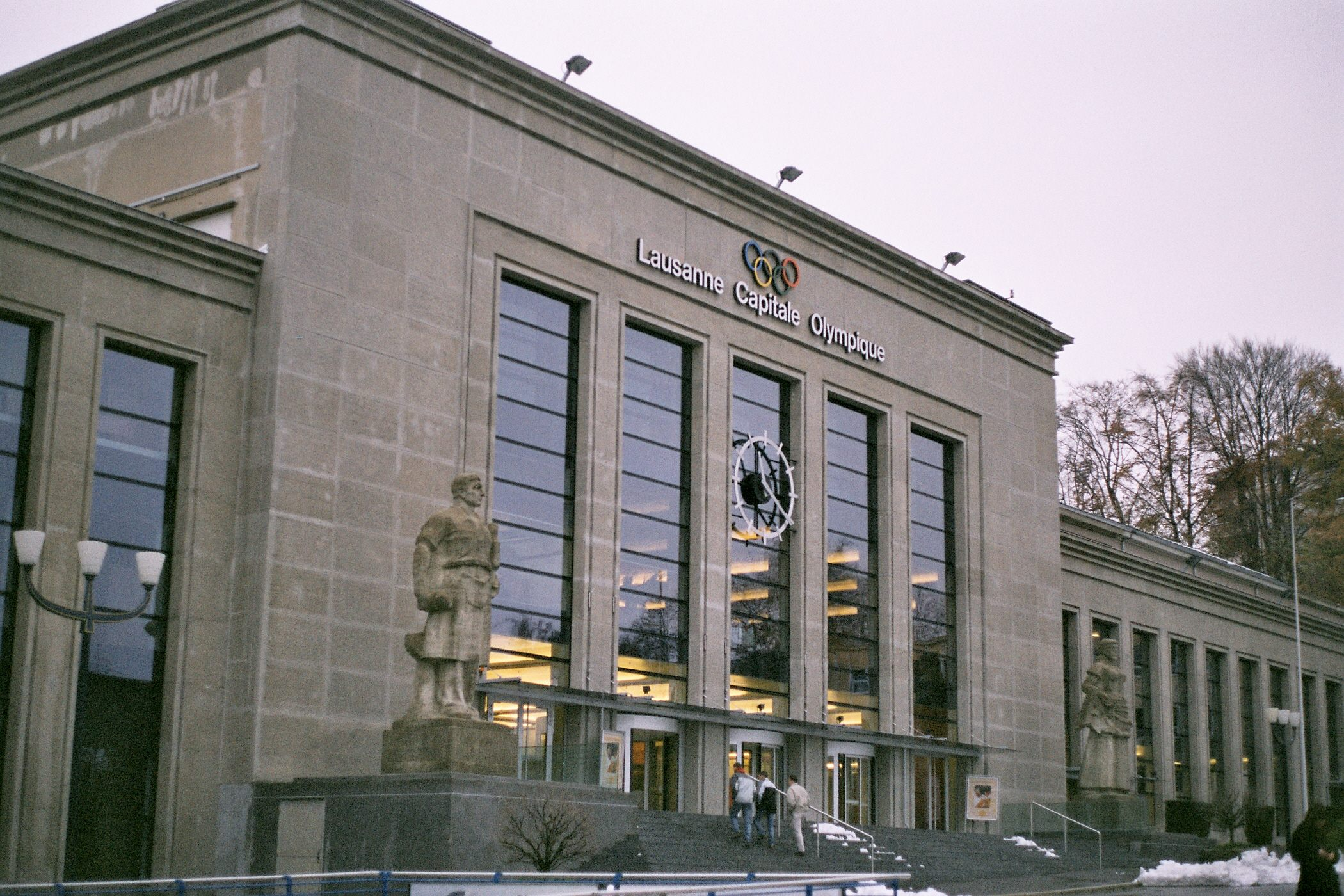
The Palais de Beaulieu, where the final selection is usually held

The Prix is held annually over a one-week period in January, usually at the Théâtre de Beaulieu in Lausanne. The dimensions of the stage of the Théâtre de Beaulieu are: 12 meters (39 ft) wide × 14 m (46 ft) deep. Initially, the stage had a 3.6% rake, which was removed after the 2022 renovation.

Occasionally the organization has arranged for the finals to be held in other locations: New York City in 1985, Tokyo in 1989, Moscow in 1995, and online in 2021, in order to accommodate the participants.

During the competition, the theatre has its foyers and conference halls converted into dance studios and observation areas. The backstage area houses offices, an infirmary, and a shop that sells dance clothes, books, and videos.

== The Competition ==
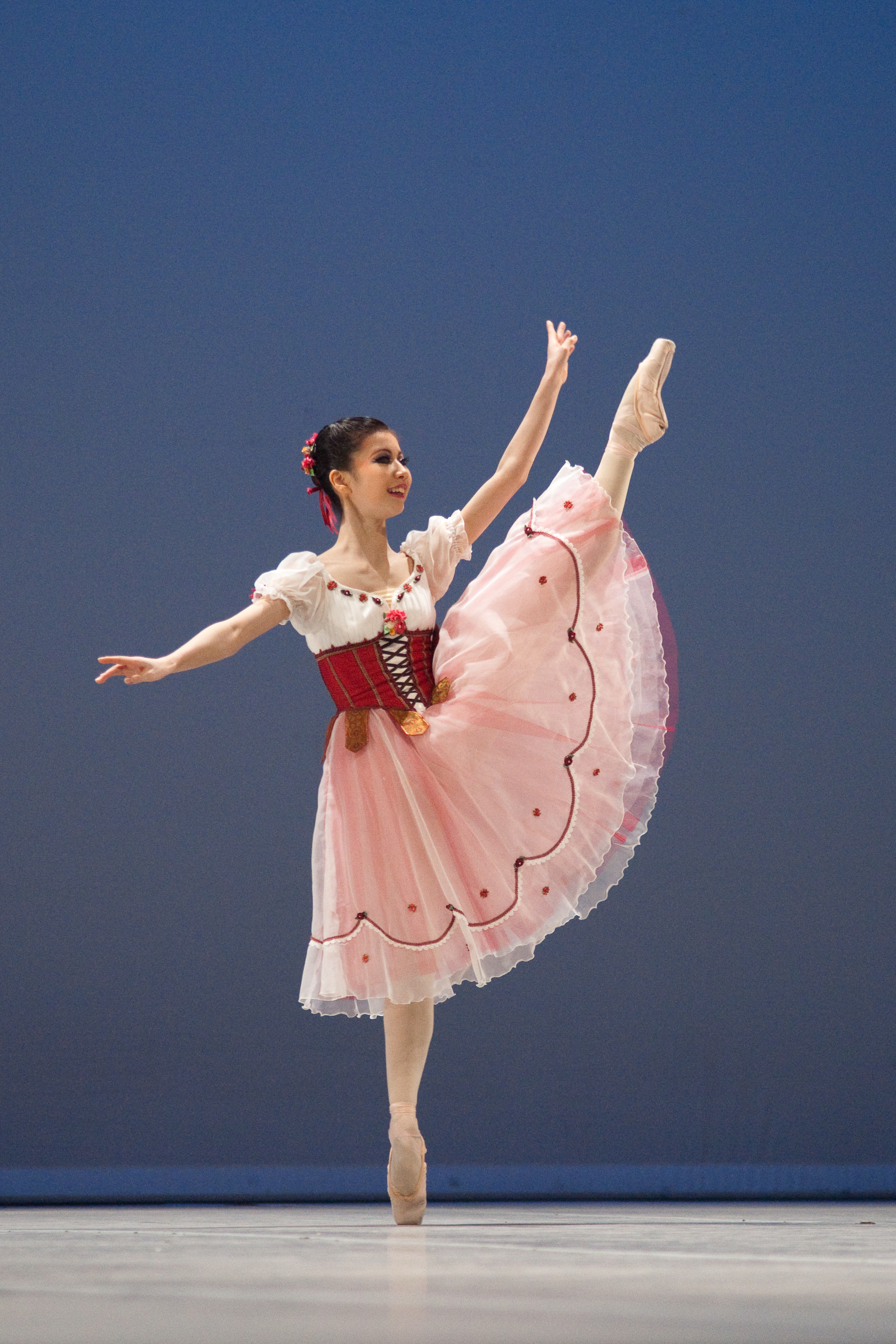
Coppélia variations at the Prix de Lausanne 2010.

The aim of the Prix de Lausanne is to facilitate the young competition prize-winners to embark upon a professional career by providing them with an opportunity to spend a year improving their skills at one of the Prix's partnering schools or to benefit from a year's apprentice scholarship with one of the international professional dance companies partnering the Prix.

Only one scholarship is available from each partner organization so decisions as to which winner is offered a place are based on their ranking. Although on occasion, they agree to accept more than one outstanding dancer.

=== Jury ===
The jury of the Prix is composed of nine people. Each member of the jury must either have a link with one of the Prix's partner ballet schools or companies, or be a former winner of the Prix. The panel is chosen to provide a wide geographical representation and mix of youth and experience. Past members of the jury:

2007

- President of the jury: Jean-Pierre Bonnefoux – artistic director of the North Carolina Dance Theatre, USA

Ramona de Saa – director of the Cuban National Ballet School, La Habana, Cuba
Aki Saito – principal of the Royal Ballet of Flanders, Prix de Lausanne prizewinner (1991)
Cathy Sharp – director of the Cathy Sharp Dance Ensemble, Basel, Switzerland
Irina Sitnikova – professor at the Vaganova Academy, Saint Petersburg, Russia
Monica Zamora – former principal of the Birmingham Royal Ballet, England, Prix de Lausanne prizewinner (1989)
Wim Broeckx – director of the Royal Conservatory, The Hague, Netherlands, Prix de Lausanne finalist (1980)

2009

- President of the jury: Karen Kain – artistic director of the National Ballet of Canada, Toronto

Amanda Bennett – director of the Ballettschule Theater, Basel, Switzerland
Marianne Krusse – educational director and teacher at the School of The Hamburg Ballet, Germany
Francia Russell – founding artistic director of the Pacific Northwest Ballet, USA, Freelance Balanchine teacher and stager
Miyako Yoshida – guest principal of the Royal Ballet, London and K-Ballet Company, Japan, Prix de Lausanne prizewinner (1983)
David McAllister – artistic director of the Australian Ballet, Australia
Patrick Armand – associate director of San Francisco Ballet School and director of San Francisco Ballet School's Trainee Program, Prix de Lausanne prizewinner (1980)
Ted Brandsen – artistic director and resident choreographer, Dutch National Ballet, Amsterdam
Bruce Sansom – director of the Central School of Ballet, London, England

2014

- President of the jury:Kay Mazzo – co-chairman of the School of American Ballet, New York

Kathryn Bennetts – artistic director of the Royal Ballet of Flanders, Antwerp, Belgium
Alessandra Ferri – former principal of the American Ballet Theatre, director of dance programming at the Spoleto Festival, Italy, Prix de Lausanne prize winner (1980)
Gigi Hyatt – pedagogical principal and deputy director, of the School of the Hamburg Ballet, Germany
Marilyn Rowe – director of the Australian Ballet School, Melbourne, Australia
Julio Bocca – former principal of the American Ballet Theatre, director of The Sodre National Ballet, Montevideo, Uruguay
Pedro Carneiro – director of The National Conservatory Dance School, Lisbon, Portugal
Xu Gang – general repetitor and ballet master at the National Ballet of China, Beijing
Christopher Powney – artistic director of the Royal Ballet School, London, England

2016

- President of the jury: Julio Bocca – former principal of the American Ballet Theatre, director of the Sodre National Ballet, Montevideo, Uruguay

Jan Broeckx – director of The Ballet Academy, Munich, Germany, Prix de Lausanne prizewinner (1979)
Lucinda Dunn – former principal of the Australian Ballet, artistic director of Tanya Pearson Classical Coaching Academy, Prix de Lausanne prizewinner (1989)
Viviana Durante – former principal of the Royal Ballet, Prix de Lausanne prizewinner (1984)
Marcelo Gomes – principal of the American Ballet Theatre, Prix de Lausanne prizewinner (1996)
Élisabeth Platel – former principal of the Paris Opera Ballet, director of the Paris Opera Ballet School, France

=== Evaluation ===
The jury evaluates candidates throughout the competition considering their level of:

- Artistry
- Physical suitability
- Courage and individuality
- An imaginative and sensitive response to the music
- A clear grasp in communicating differing movement dynamics
- Technical facility, control, and coordination.

=== Stages ===
After the video selection, participants go through the second phase of selection rounds, which consists of the competition in Lausanne. During the week in Lausanne, candidates are judged both during a dance class and individually on stage. The Prix de Lausanne also organises preselections in Argentina and in Dresden. The four winners from each preselection are invited to participate in the competition in Lausanne. The Prix de Lausanne finances both travel and accommodation expenses for student dancers.

Twenty candidates reach the finals of the competition, and between six and eight of those finalists receive a scholarship. The Prix de Lausanne organises the winners' transfer to one of its partner schools or companies, and monitors their development during the grant year (settling in, health, education, career prospects, etc.). Candidates who are not selected for the finals can participate in the Networking Forum, which gives them an opportunity to be seen by schools and company directors from around the world. Following an audition class, interviews are organised with directors of Prix de Lausanne partner schools and companies wishing to recruit one or more candidates. Interviews with finalists who do not receive a prize are also arranged after the awards ceremony.

The most recent Prix de Lausanne took place from January 29th to February 5th, 2023.

=== Prizes ===
- Prix de Lausanne Scholarship – a scholarship of one year's tuition and the sum of CHF 16,000, given in ten monthly installments, for living expenses during the prize winner's year of studies.
- Prix de Lausanne Apprentice Scholarship – consists of a one-year apprentice scholarship for awardees over 17 and the sum of CHF 16,000, in ten monthly installments, for living expenses.
- Contemporary Dance Prize – consists of contemporary dance course at one of the partnering institutions and includes both travel and living expenses.
- Best Swiss Candidate Prize – consists of a cash prize of CHF 2,500 awarded to the best finalist residing in Switzerland and having trained in Switzerland for at least three years prior to the competition.

All finalists are offered free summer courses (travel and accommodation costs not covered) and receive a diploma and a medal. Finalists not winning a prize receive a consolation prize of CHF 1,000 in cash.

== Winners ==
Prix de Lausanne 2009 poster

=== Since 1973 ===
- 1973 : Michel Gascard, former Soloist with Béjart Ballet, currently co-director of Rudra Béjart Studio-School.
- 1975 : Philippe Talard, French dancer and choreographer.
- 1976 : Jana Kurova, Czech ballerina and choreographer.
- 1976 : Ben Van Cauwenbergh, Belgian, currently director of the Aalto Ballet Essen and choreographer.
- 1977 : Jean-Christophe Maillot, choreographer and company director of Les Ballets de Monte Carlo, Paola Cantalupo, Étoile with Les Ballets de Monte Carlo and former principal dancer with National Ballet of Portugal
- 1980 : Nancy Raffa, retired Principal with Ballet de Santiago, Ballet National Francaise, then Miami City Ballet
- 1982 : Delphine Collerie de Borely
- 1983 : Miyako Yoshida, retired Principal with The Royal Ballet
- 1984 : Viviana Durante, former Principal with The Royal Ballet
- 1985 : Edward Stierle, former leading dancer with the Joffrey Ballet
- 1986 : Darcey Bussell, President of the Royal Academy of Dance and retired principal of The Royal Ballet,
- 1987 : Yilei Cai, former Principal with the Scottish Ballet.
- 1988 : Lisa-Maree Cullum, retired principal with Staatsballett Berlin, Bayerisches Staatsballett and now Artistic Director at the Tanya Pearson Academy, Australia.
- 1989 : Tetsuya Kumakawa, former principal with The Royal Ballet and artistic director of K-Ballet in Tokyo, Japan
- 1990 : Carlos Acosta, retired Principal with The Royal Ballet, now Director of the Birmingham Royal Ballet
- 1991 : Christopher Wheeldon, choreographer and artistic director of Morphoses/The Wheeldon Company
- 1992 : Laetitia Pujol, later étoile with the Ballet de l'Opéra de Paris, Jiří Bubeníček, choreographer, principal dancer with Dresden Semperoper Ballett and former principal dancer with Hamburg Ballet
- 1994 : Diana Vishneva, principal with Kirov Ballet and Guest Principal Artist with American Ballet Theatre, Benjamin Millepied, choreographer and former principal dancer with New York City Ballet
- 1995 : Gonzalo Garcia, former principal with New York City Ballet
- 1996 : Marcelo Gomes, former principal with American Ballet Theatre, Ivan Putrov, former principal with The Royal Ballet, Shoko Nakamura, principal with Berlin Staatsoper
- 1997 : Alina Cojocaru, former Principal with The Royal Ballet, English National Ballet, now guest principal with Hamburg Ballet
- 1998 : Ekaterina Menchikh, ballerina with the Zurich Opera (Ballet Company of Heinz Spoerli)
- 2000 : Yao Wei, principal with the Royal Danish Ballet, Yuriko Kajiya, principal dancer with the Houston Ballet, former soloist with the American Ballet Theatre
- 2001 : Misa Kuranaga, principal with San Francisco Ballet, Jaime Garcia Castilla, principal with San Francisco Ballet and Ludovic Ondiviela, first artist with The Royal Ballet
- 2001 : Sarawanee Tanatanit, former dancer with the Grand Théâtre de Genève and American Ballet Theatre, Natalia de Froberville (Domratcheva), étoile with Théâtre du Capitole, former principal with Perm Opera and Ballet Theatre and former principal with Kyiv Ballet, National Opera of Ukraine
- 2002 : Maria Kochetkova, former principal with the San Francisco Ballet and Yuhui Choe, first soloist with The Royal Ballet
- 2003 : Steven McRae, principal dancer with The Royal Ballet and Hee Seo, principal with American Ballet Theatre
- 2004 : Alex Wong, former principal soloist with the Miami City Ballet
- 2005 : Jin Young Won
- 2005 : Yujin Kim, principal with Alonzo King Lines Ballet
- 2006 : Sergei Polunin, former principal dancer with The Royal Ballet
- 2007 : Sae Eun Park, étoile with the Paris Opera Ballet
- 2008 : Akane Takada, principal dancer with The Royal Ballet and Aleix Martinez, principal dancer with the Hamburg Ballet
- 2009 : Hannah O'Neill, étoile with the Paris Opera Ballet
- 2010 : Cristian Emanuel Amuchastegui, corps de ballet with the Hamburg Ballet
- 2011 : Mayara Magri, principal dancer with The Royal Ballet
- 2012 : Madoka Sugai, principal dancer Hamburg Ballet
- 2013 : Adhonay Silva, principal dancer with the Stuttgart Ballet
- 2014 : Haruo Niyama, international dancer & guest artist
- 2015 : Harrison Lee, first artist with The Royal Ballet
- 2016 : Yu Hang, first artist with The Royal Ballet
- 2017 : Michele Esposito, dancer with the Les Ballets de Monte-Carlo
- 2018 : Shale Wagman, quadrille with the Paris Opera Ballet, former first soloist with the Bayerisches Staatsballett
- 2019 : Mackenzie Brown, principal dancer with Stuttgart Ballet
- 2020 : Marco Masciari, first artist with The Royal Ballet
- 2021 : António Casalinho, principal dancer with the Vienna State Ballet, former principal dancer with the Bayerisches Staatsballett
- 2022 : Darrion Sellman, second soloist with the Royal Swedish Ballet
- 2023 : Millán de Benito Arancón & Fabrizzio Ulloa Cornejo
- 2024 : João Pedro dos Santos Silva
- 2025 : YounJae Park
- 2026 : William Gyves

== Pictures (2010) ==
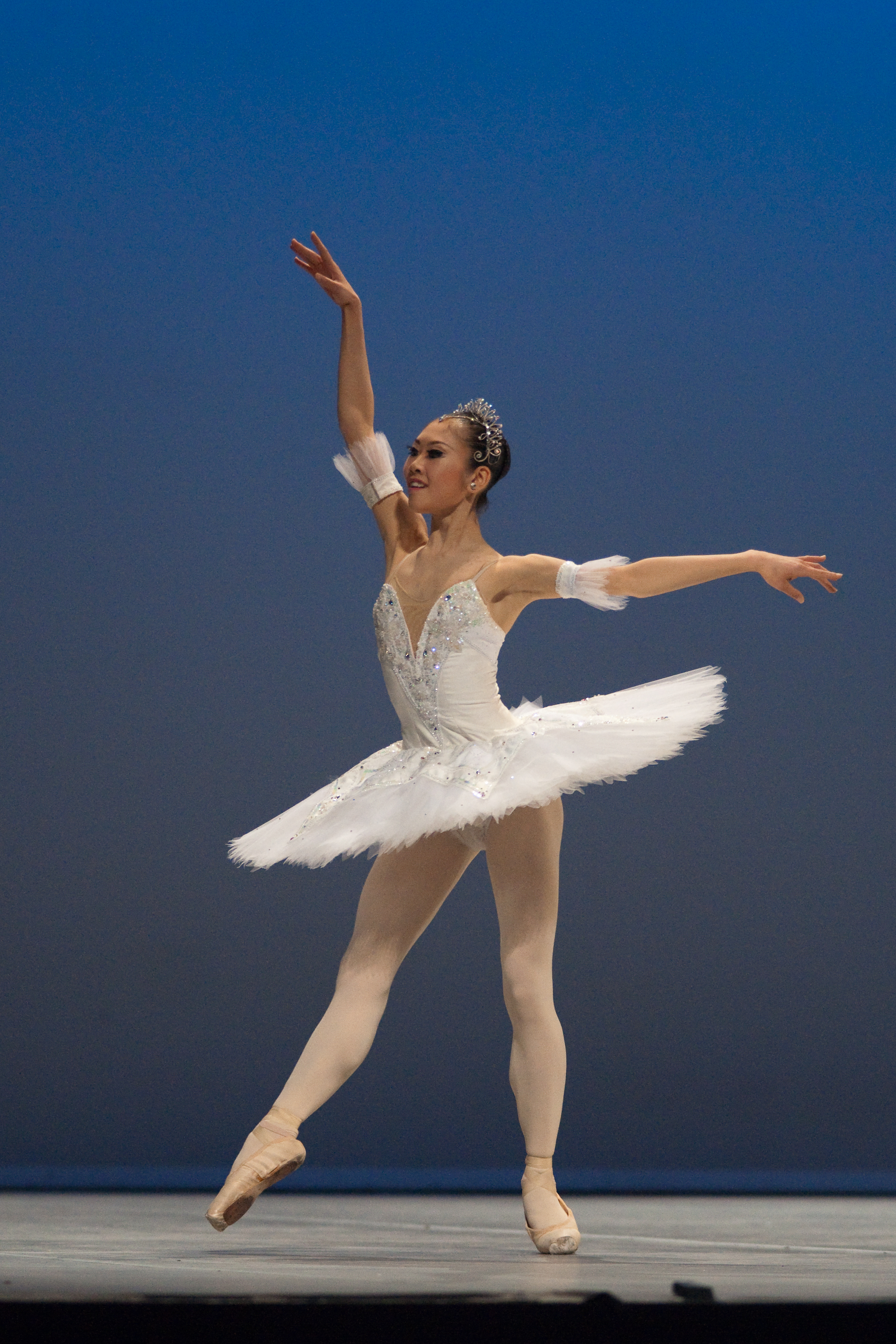
La Bayadère variations

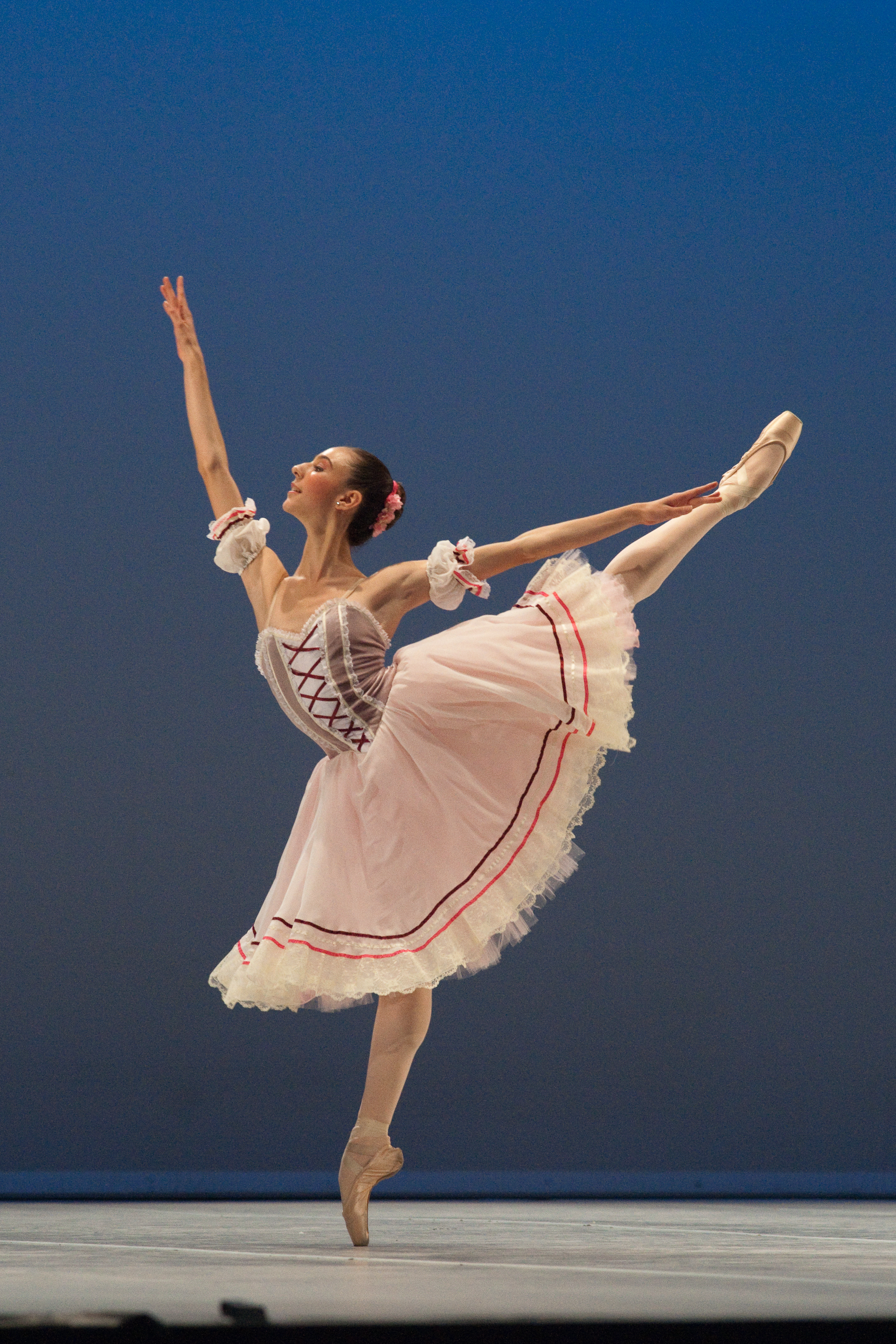
Coppélia variations

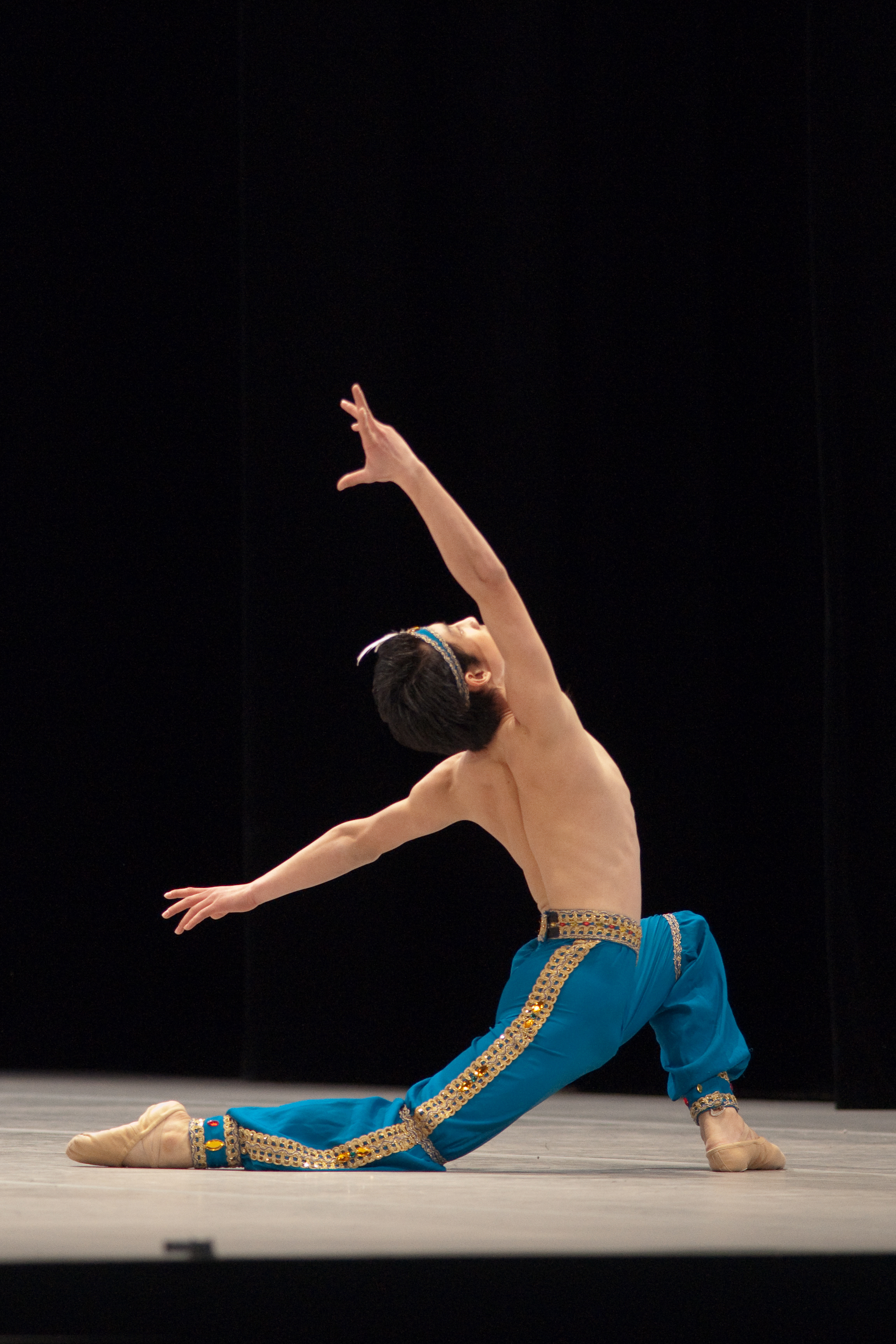
Le Corsaire variations

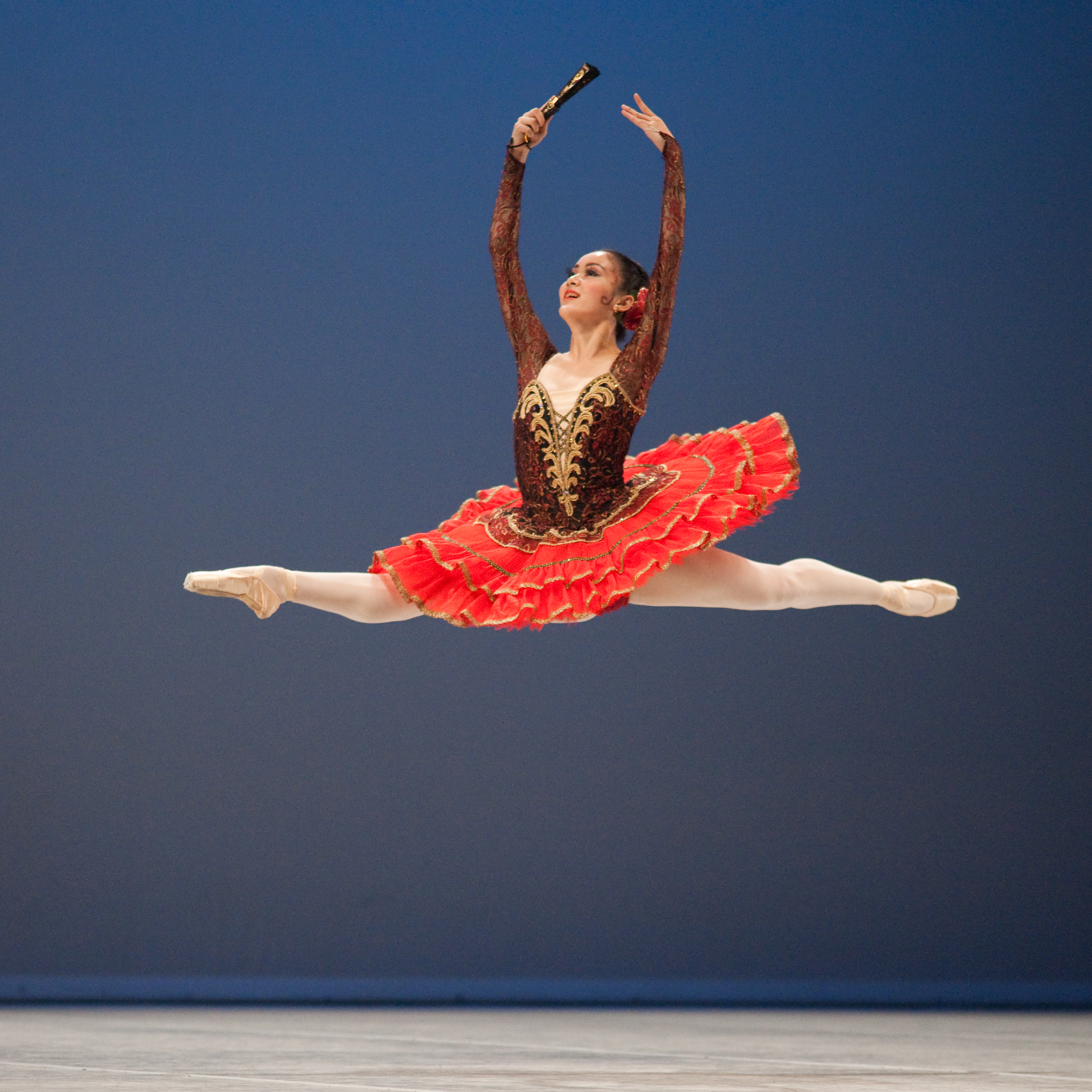
Don Quixote variations

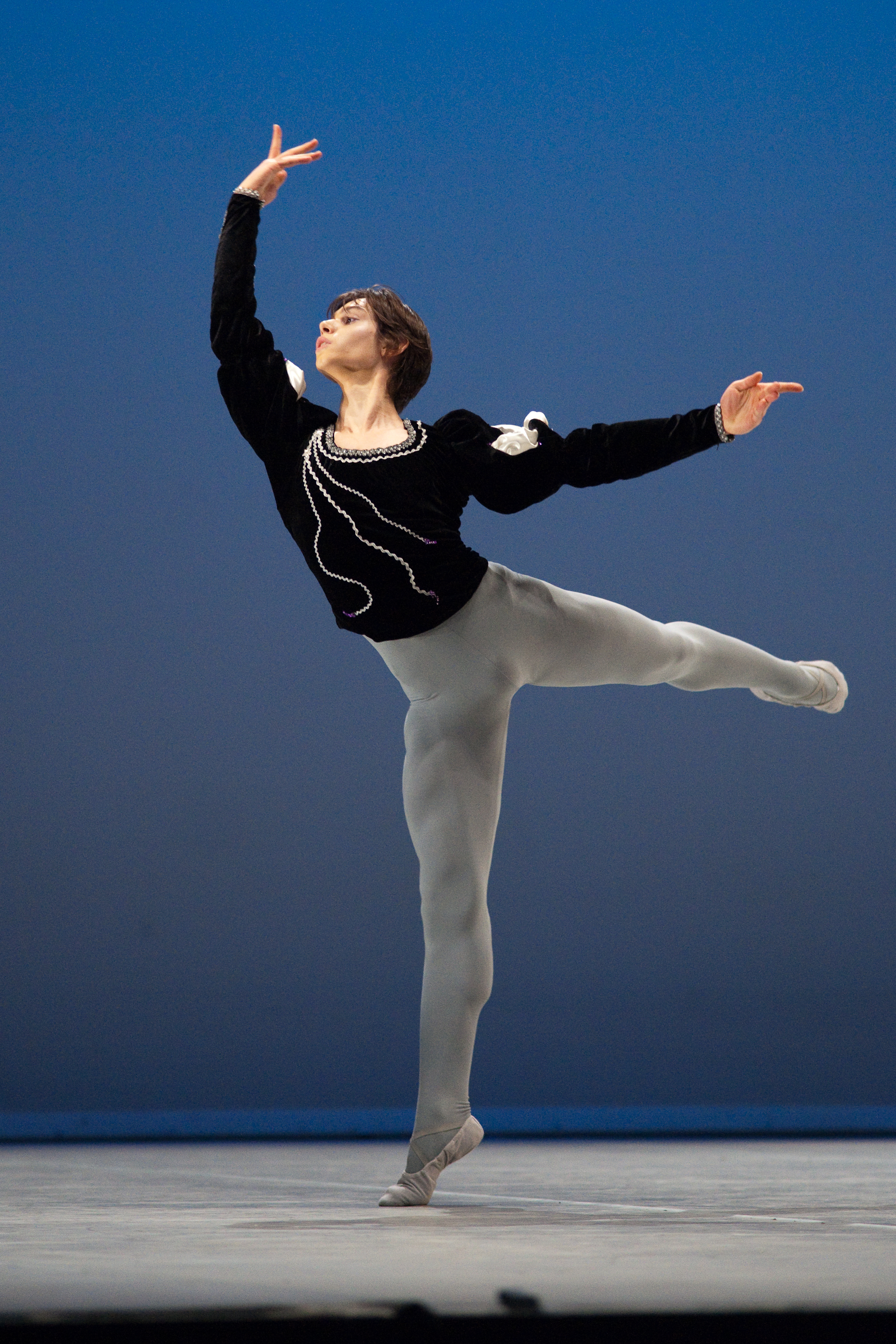
Giselle variations

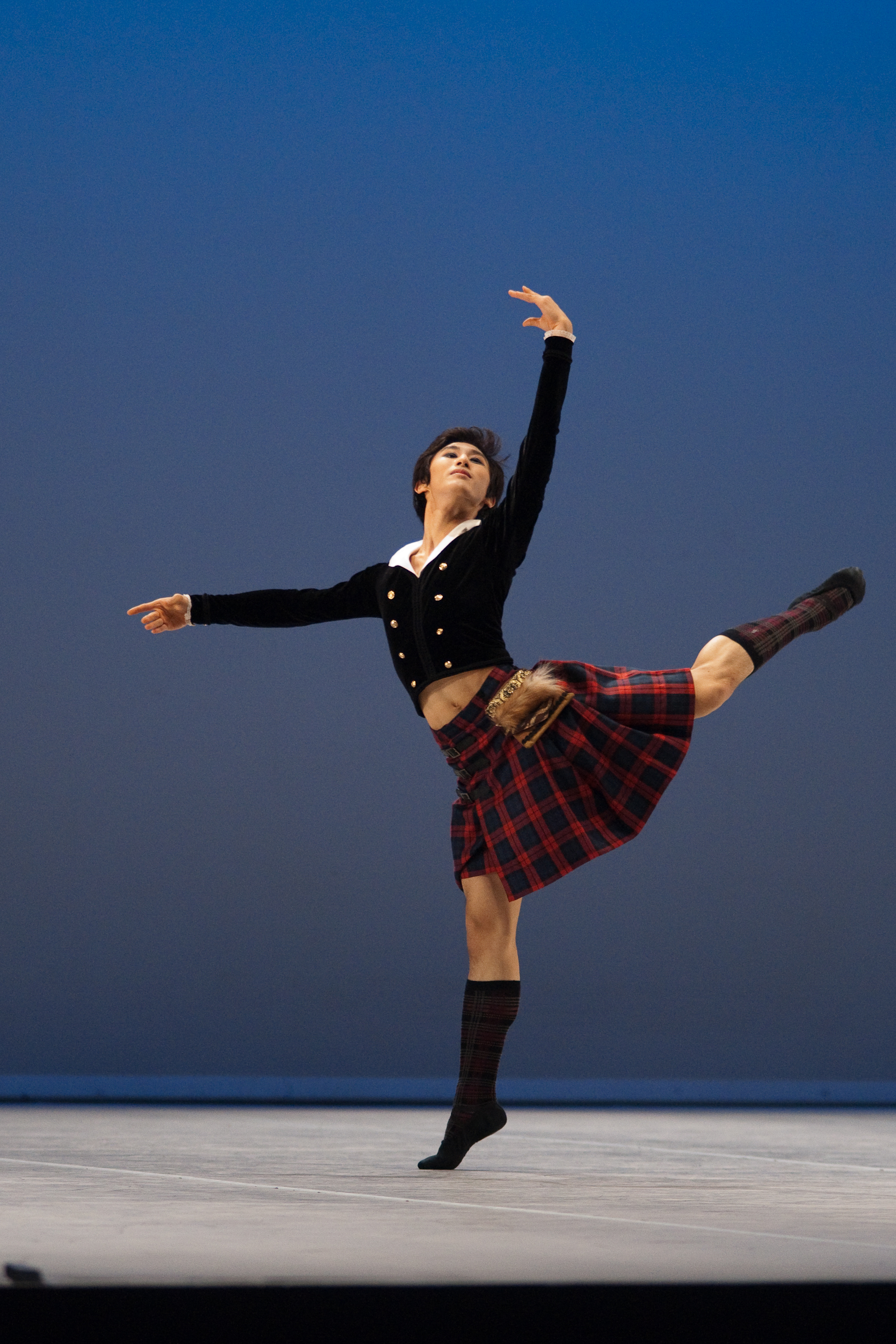
La Sylphide variations

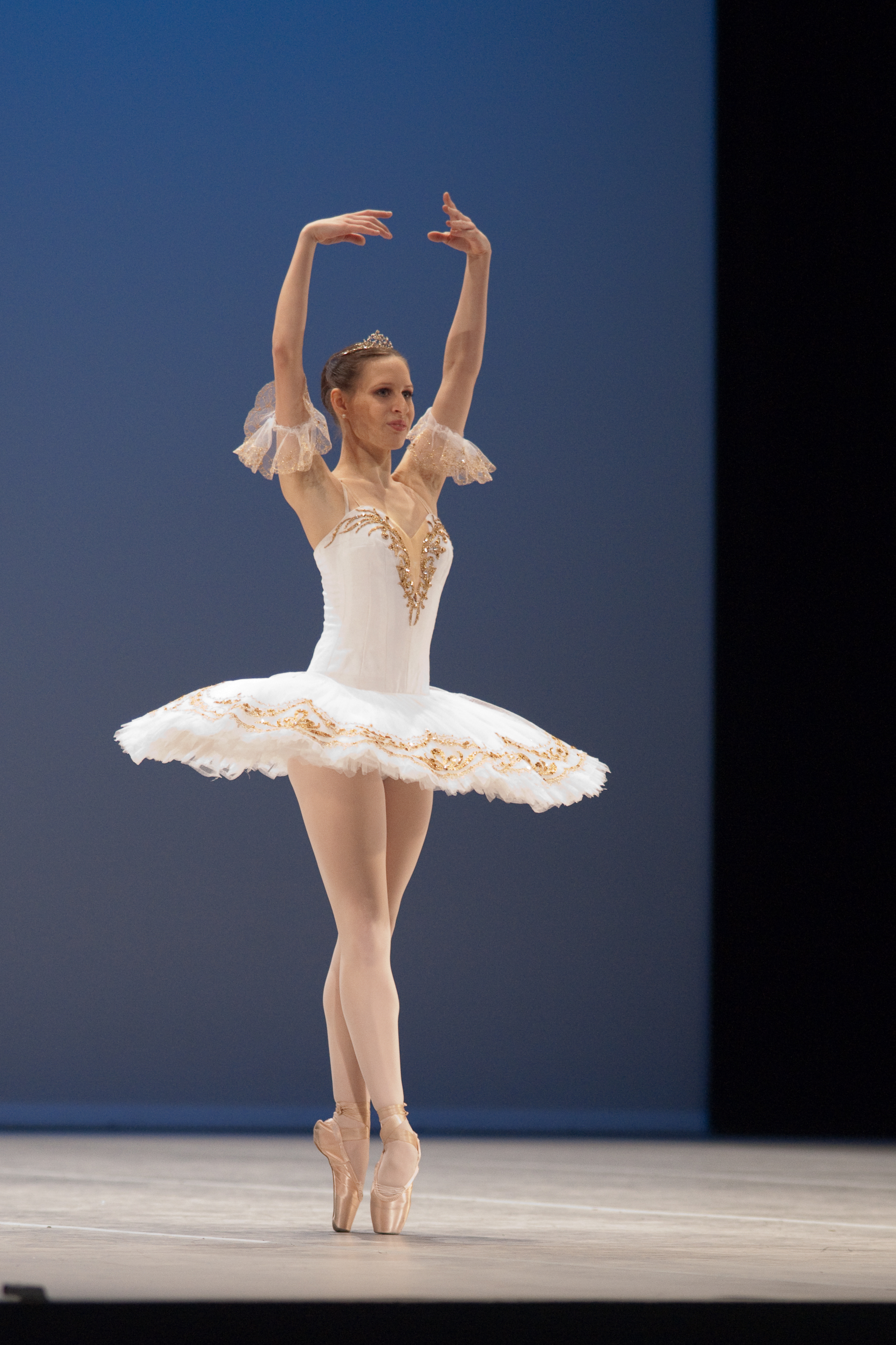
Raymonda variations

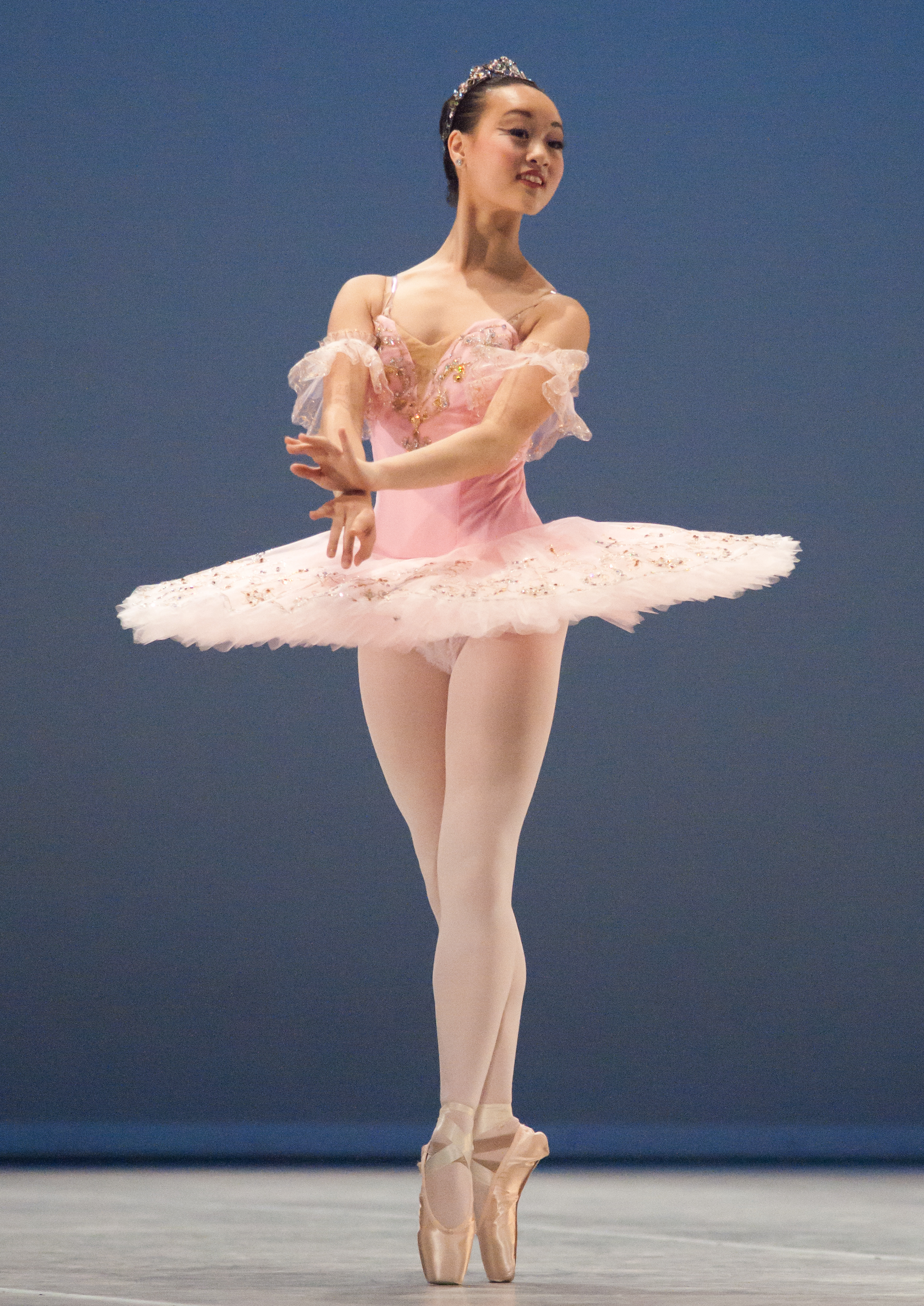
The Sleeping Beauty variations

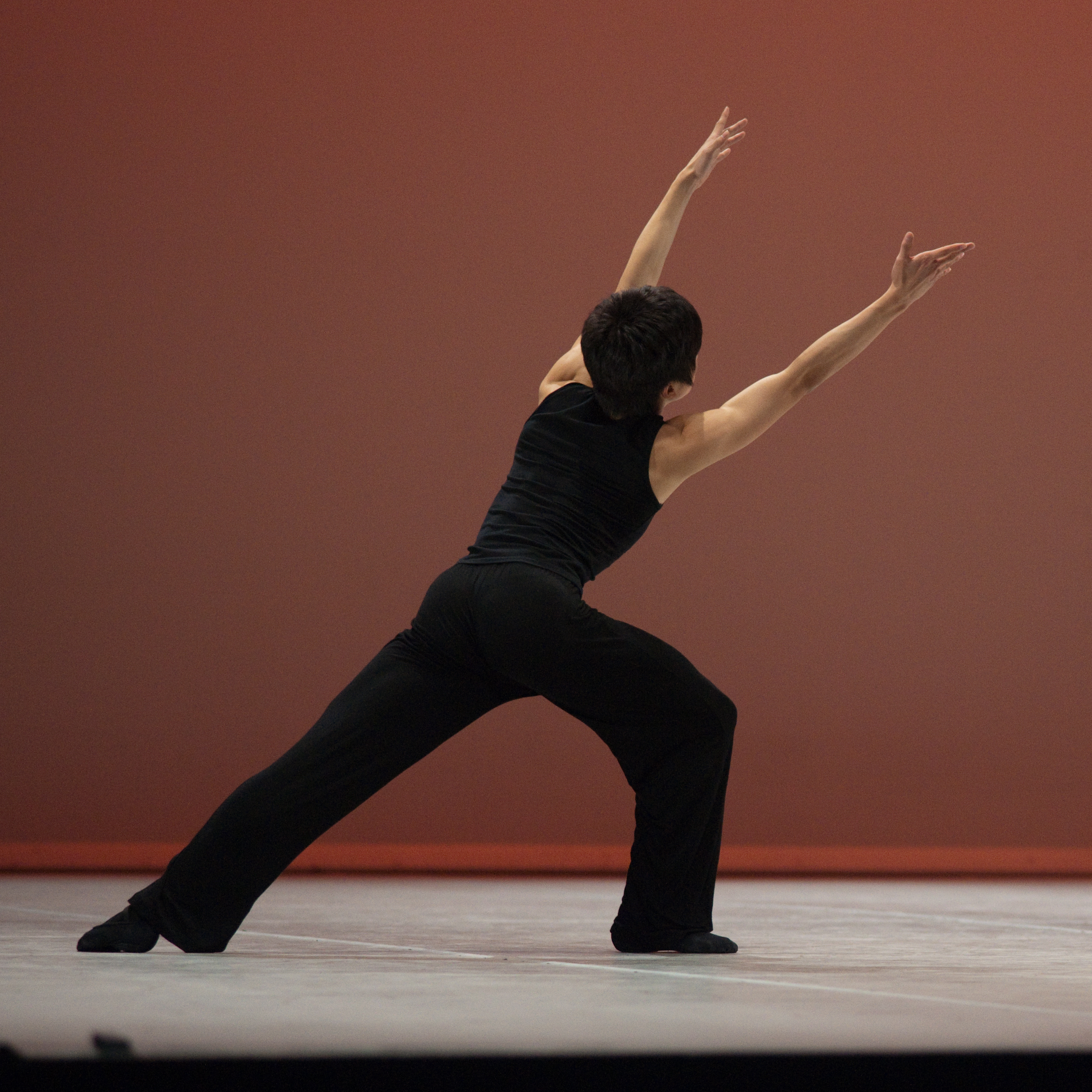
Contemporary variations

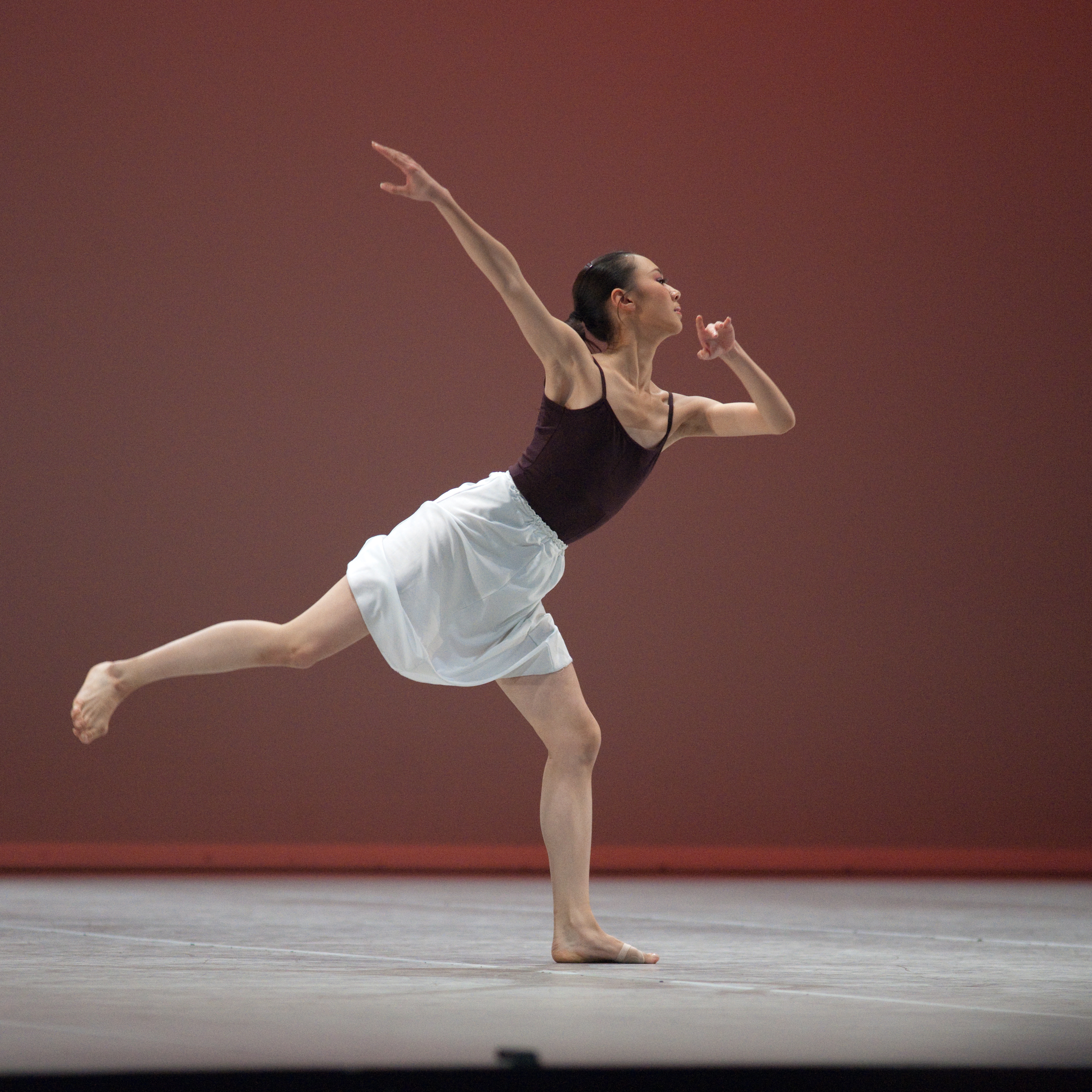
Contemporary variations

== See also ==
- Prix Benois de la Danse
- Zenaida Yanowsky, Prix de Lausanne finalist, 1992
