= Order of Cultural Merit =

The Order of Cultural Merit is an honour or decoration awarded by a country. It may refer to:

- Order of Cultural Merit (Korea)
- Order of Cultural Merit (Monaco)
- Order of Cultural Merit (Romania)
- Ordem do Mérito Cultural, Brazil

== See also ==
- Order of Culture, an Order of Japan
- Person of Cultural Merit, an honour of Japan
