= Jeanne Brabants =

Belgian dancer, choreographer and teacher

Baroness Jeanne Brabants
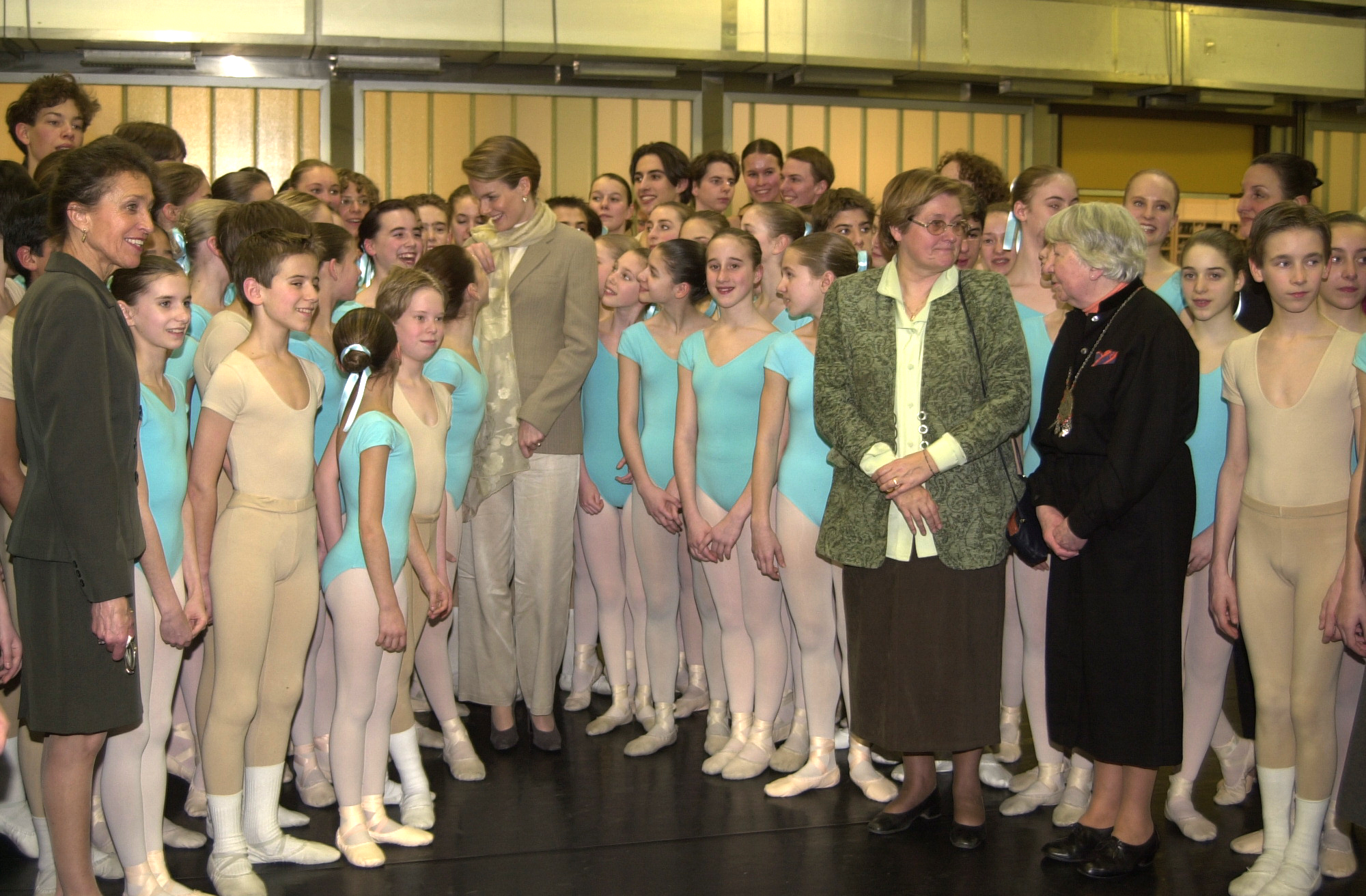
- Jeanne Brabants (right, in black dress) in 2001
- Born: Jeanne Brabants; 25 January 1920; Antwerp, Belgium
- Died: 2 January 2014 (aged 93); Antwerp, Belgium
- Occupations: Dancer, choreographer, teacher
- Years active: 1930s–1984

Jeanne, Baroness Brabants (25 January 1920 – 2 January 2014) was a Belgian dancer, choreographer and teacher. She is known as "the woman who taught Flanders to dance professionally".

== Early life ==
Brabants was born in Antwerp. She learned much about ballet in her younger days in London under Ninette de Valois. She practiced modern dance with Lea Daan, Kurt Jooss and Sigurd Leeder.

== Professional life ==
She founded the Brabant Ballet School with her father in 1941. During the Second World War, she founded the Dance Ensemble of the Brabant Sisters with her sisters. This ballet school was incorporated into the Royal Flemish Opera in 1951-1952 under her impetus.

=== Establishment of Royal Ballet School ===
In 1951, she established the Ballet School of the Royal Flemish Opera within the Royal Flemish Opera. In 1964, the Ballet School of the Royal Flemish Opera became the Stedelijk Instituut voor Ballet (SIB), now the internationally renowned Royal Ballet School in Antwerp. Jeanne Brabants was the director. From the onwards of 1990s, it is an internationally renowned institution which provides a complete professional dance training for young people from 8 to 18 years of age.

=== Formation of the Royal Ballet of Flanders ===
Brabants designed some 200 choreographies, worked with internationally recognized people and achieved numerous international awards. She formed the Royal Ballet of Flanders in 1969. Making its debut with Prometheus, the "Flanders Ballet" repertoire included contemporary works choreographed by her and its chief choreographer Andre Leclair. This included not only works by several of the most prominent contemporary figures (Jiri Kylian, John Butler, Maurice Bejart, Hans van Manen) but also classic pieces by the likes of Mikhail Fokine, George Balanchine, Frederick Ashton and Kurt Jooss, as well as numerous ‘home-grown’ creations (by, for example, Jeanne Brabants, Andre Leclair, Aime de Figniere, Marc Bogaerts etc.). Formation of Royal Ballet of Flanders made ballet, which was for a long time closely linked with opera, become autonomous. Leading the Ballet of Flanders until 1984, she created choreographies including Dialoog, Cantus Firmus, Ode and Grand Hôtel.

== Retirement ==
When she retired from the Ballet of Flanders, she started an association called Youth and Dance, another association for professional dancers and a dance group, Danza Antiqua, which recreated Renaissance and baroque dances. She also continued to fight for the rights of dancers.

Jeanne Brabants died on 2 January 2014, aged 93, in her hometown of Antwerp.
