= Dorcon =

Character from Greek literature

Dorcon (Greek: Δόρκων) is a character in the ancient Greek novel Daphnis and Chloe by Longus. A brutish cow-herder and the would-be suitor of Chloe, Dorcon dies when pirates raid the country.

Dorcon approaches Chloe's father to ask for her hand in marriage, trying to convince Dryas with a gift of noble cheeses. He tries to assuage his love for Chloe in a variety of ways, including one scene where he clothes himself in a wolf skin and hides in a bush. As he waits to sneak up on Chloe, he is attacked by Daphnis and Chloe's herding dogs. When Daphnis and Chloe discover the cause of commotion in the bush, they come to Dorcon's aid and assume he was playing some "pastoral trick".

Dorcon is later killed by Tyrian pirates during a raid. Chloe finds him dying, and for his last wish, he asks her to grant him a kiss – and to think of him when she sees another tending cattle.

== Name ==
Dorcon's name, "δόρκων", even though a pastoral one, is not mentioned in either Theocritus or Vergil. It bears the association with the Greek "δορκάς", referring to an animal of the deer kind. The association seems to give the impression of pastoral innocence, but Dorcon soon proves to be more violent like a wild animal.

== Role in the novel ==
Scholars agree that Dorcon's presence marks the first threat to the romance between Daphnis and Chloe, which has only just started to bloom. This is highlighted by Dorcon's attempt to abduct Chloe in the disguise of a wolf, having failed to seduce Chloe through gifts and a pastoral beauty contest. Dorcon is temporarily turned into an expression of natural violence as a wolf, threatening Chloe's chastity. Ironically, Dorcon's violent disguise is broken by a form of rural violence, similar to the one he was imitating, in the shape of biting dogs. The tension between rural violence and urban values is a theme present throughout the whole novel, of which Dorcon is one of the first manifestations. Dorcon's demise fits in this framework of tension, due to the fact that Dorcon is slaughtered by human hands, described as a sacrificial bull dying for his herd, and ensures the continuation of Dapnis and Chloe's romance. Dorcon gives Chloe his set of pipes and instructs her to play them to stir up his cattle, who turn over the pirate ship on which Dapnhis had been abducted. By saving everyone as the bull of his herd, Dorcon simultaneously becomes a bucolic hero, as well as retaining his status as a bestial figure. The set of pipes given to Chloe will later on in the novel support her growing status of a woman losing her voice to society's violence, adding to the tension between rural and urban influences. After Dorcon's death, Lykainion (little she-wolf) enters the narrative as an urban and female equivalent of Dorcon, pressuring Daphnis' chastity.

== Sources ==
- Epstein, S. (1995). Longus' Werewolves. Classical Philology, 90(1), 58-73. Retrieved February 8, 2021, from http://www.jstor.org/stable/270691
- Morgan, J. (2011). Poets and Shepherds: Philetas and Longus. In Doulamis K. (Ed.), Echoing Narratives: Studies of Intertextuality in Greek and Roman Prose Fiction (pp. 139–160). Barkhuis. Retrieved February 8, 2021, from http://www.jstor.org/stable/j.ctt13wwxfk.10
- Winkler, J.J. (1990) “The Education of Chloe: Hidden Injuries of Sex”. In The Constraints of Desire: The Anthropology of Sex and Gender in Ancient Greece, edited by J. Winkler. New York: Routledge. pp. 101–126.
