= Stülpnagel =

Family of German nobility from the Uckermark

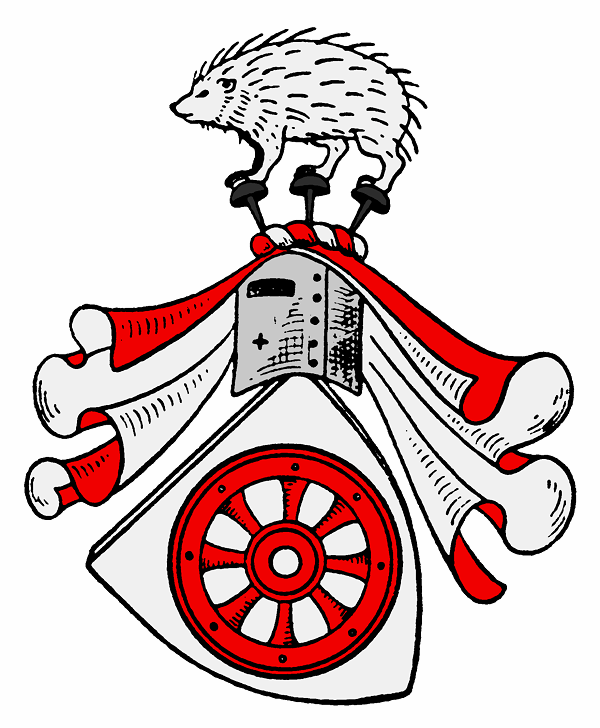
Coat of arms of the Stülpnagel family

The Stülpnagel family is an old German noble family from the Uckermark, Brandenburg. Members of the family held significant military positions during the German Empire.

== History ==
They were first documented in 1321 and can trace their lineage to Valentin von Stülpnagel, living in the middle of the 15th century.

== Notable members ==
- Otto von Stülpnagel (1878–1948), general in charge of occupied France
- Joachim Fritz Constantin von Stülpnagel (1880–1968), general in charge of the Replacement Army
- Carl-Heinrich von Stülpnagel (1886–1944), German Second World War general.
- Friedrich von Stülpnagel (1913–1996), Olympic athlete
- Karina Jäger-von Stülpnagel (born 1972), ballet dancer
