= Nancy Raffa =

American ballet master (born c. 1964)

Nancy Raffa (born c. 1964) is an American ballet master.

== Early years ==
Raffa was born in Brooklyn, New York City.

She began training in ballet under the instruction of Gabriella Taub‐Darvash. She started dancing at the age of seven. Raffa was one of the young dancers highlighted in a 1979 article in The New York Times.

== Dancing ==
At 16 years old, Raffa became the youngest, and first American female to win the Gold Medal at Prix de Lausanne in 1980. That year, she joined Natalia Makarova and Company on Broadway.

In 1981 Raffa joined the American Ballet Theatre, where she became a member of the corps de ballet.

Raffa danced many roles, including dancing in Tharp's Push Comes to Shove with Baryshnikov. She later joined as principal dancer with Ballet de Santiago, Ballet National Francaise, then Miami City Ballet.

In 1981, Raffa performed at Jacob's Pillow, a dance center in Massachusetts.

In 1985 she danced in a performance led by Twyla Tharp. In 1987 she danced the role of Swanilda in Coppelia, and The New York Times described her performance as having a 'memorably luminous quality'.

== Teaching and coaching ==
After a serious injury, she retired from dancing and entered the field of teaching and coaching. In 1994, she joined the staff of the Miami City Ballet School. Raffa was twice awarded a special teacher's recognition from the National Foundation for he Advancement in the Arts. She was also awarded a grant from the United States Information Services to be a cultural ambassador for a company and school in Honduras. In addition, Raffa graduated magna cum laude in 2002 with a bachelor's degree in Psychology from St. Thomas University.

Raffa became head director of the American Ballet Theatre's National Summer Intensive program. In 2007, she was promoted to ballet mistress with the main company. She also worked with the American Ballet Theatre's Jacqueline Kennedy Onassis School. She has also worked closely with resident choreographer Alexei Ratmansky. She has aided him in his choreographic process for every ballet he has ever done with ABT. She sets many of his ABT works with companies around the globe.

== Awards and honors ==
In 1980 Raffa received a gold medal in the International Ballet Competition. She was the first American to receive a gold medal at the competition.
