= Order of Cultural Merit (Monaco) =

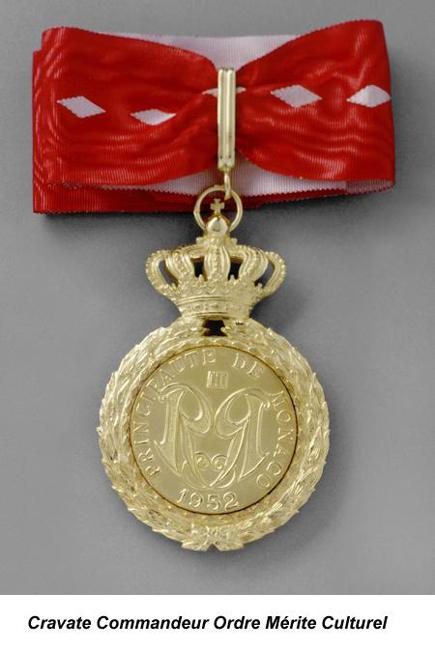
- Commander's insignia

Awarded by Prince of Monaco
- Type: Order of merit
- Royal house: House of Grimaldi
- Eligibility: Citizens of Monaco and foreigners
- Awarded for: distinction in the arts, letters and science through their work or teaching in Monaco. Contributions in those areas and extended the intellectual influence of the Principality, even outside of Monaco.
- Status: Currently constituted
- Sovereign: His Serene Highness Albert II, Prince of Monaco
- Chancellor: Raoul Biancheri, Plenipotentiary Minister
- Grades: Commander, Officer, Knight

Precedence
- Next (higher): Order of Grimaldi
- Next (lower): Medal of Honour
- Commander Officer Knight

The Order of Cultural Merit (French: Ordre du Mérite culturel; Monégasque: U̍rdine d’u Me̍ritu Cürtürale) is the fourth highest Order of the Principality of Monaco. The order was established by Rainier III, Prince of Monaco on 31 December 1952 by Sovereign Order 689. It is awarded to recognize those who have made a distinctive contribution to the arts, letters or science through their work or teaching in Monaco. It may also be awarded to recognize individuals in those areas who have extended the intellectual influence of the Principality, even from outside Monaco.

== Insignia ==
The order is presented in three different grades: Commander, Officer, and Knight. Each grade's insignia share certain characteristics. The badge of the Order consists of a round medallion, framed by a laurel wreath and suspended by the Heraldic Crown of Monaco. The obverse of the medallion contains the monogram of Prince Rainier III, formed by two mirrored "R"s, surrounded by the inscription "Principauté de Monaco 1952". The reverse depicts an arrangement of objects symbolizing the arts and sciences, a lyre, books, compass, etc. On the upper right is the inscription "Arts Lettres Sciences". The medallions are suspended from a ribbon of red with a line of white lozenges in the center. This design is likely inspired by the Monegasque flag variant which is described in the language of heraldry as "lozengy argent and gules". The commander's badge is gold and is worn suspended from the neck. The officers badge, made of silver, is worn on a ribbon with a rosette suspended from the left chest. The knight's badge, made of bronze, is worn suspended by a plain ribbon from the left chest.

== Notable recipients ==
- 1997 – James DePreist (Officer)
- 1997 – Laurent Petitgirard (Officer)
- 1999 – Cecilia Bartoli (Commander)
- 1999 – Hélène Carrère d'Encausse (Commander)
- 1999 – Plácido Domingo (Commander)
- 1999 – Alain Peyrefitte (Commander)
- 1999 – Ruggero Raimondi (Commander)
- 1999 – Mstislav Rostropovich (Commander)
- 1999 – Salvatore Accardo
- 2003 – Luciano Pavarotti (Commander)
- 2003 – Francis Perrin (Officer)
- 2004 – Tahar Ben Jelloun (Commander)
- 2004 – Michel Boujenah (Officer)
- 2005 – Sacha Sosno (Commander)
- 2005 – Ernest Pignon-Ernest (Officer)
- 2006 – Robert Hossein (Commander)
- 2007 – Pierre Cardin (Commander)
- 2007 – Yves Coppens (Commander)
- 2007 – Frédéric Mitterrand (Officer)
- 2008 – Danielle Darrieux (Knight)
- 2008 – Jean Piat (Knight)
- 2008 – Jean-Marie Rouart (Commander)
- 2010 – Jean-Louis Grinda (Knight)
- 2011 – Élisabeth Badinter (Commander)
- 2011 – Henry de Lumley (Commander)
- 2012 – Gilles Kepel (Officer)
- 2012 – Bruno Racine (Knight)
- 2013 – Irina Bokova (Officer)
- 2014 – Jean-Christophe Maillot (Commander)
- 2014 – Amin Maalouf (Officer)
- 2015 – Bernice Coppieters
- 2015 – Vladimir Medinsky (Commander)
- 2017 – Philippe Rahm (Knight)
- 2018 – Jean-Jacques Aillagon (Commander)
- 2018 – Marcus Miller (Officer)
- 2019 – Manu Katché (Knight)
- 2019 – Maxim Vengerov (Knight)
- 2024 – Charlotte Casiraghi (Knight)

== See also ==
- Orders, decorations, and medals of Monaco
