= Karina Jäger-von Stülpnagel =

German ballerina

Karina Jäger-von Stülpnagel is a German ballet dancer, choreographer, and dance teacher. She is a former soloist with the Royal Ballet of Flanders.

== Biography ==
Jäger-von Stülpnagel is from Offenbach, Hesse, in Germany and is a member of the noble Stülpnagel family. She began her ballet career as a dancer at the Staatstheater Mainz. She danced with the Royal Ballet of Flanders in Antwerp, Belgium, and was promoted to the rank of soloist. She later danced at the Theater Saarbrücken. She performed lead roles in Jan Fabre's Swan Lake, Rudolf Nureyev's The Sleeping Beauty and Don Quixote, William Forsythe's Impressing the Czar, and George Balanchine's Divertimento no. 15. She later retired from the stage and began running a classical ballet school in Seligenstadt alongside Valentin Fanel Badiu.
