= Royal Ballet of Flanders =

Belgian dance company

General information
- Name: Royal Ballet of Flanders
- Local name: Koninklijk Ballet Vlaanderen
- Year founded: 1969
- Founding artistic director: Jeanne Brabants
- Principal venue: Theater ’t Eilandje, Antwerp
- Website: www.operaballet.be

Senior staff
- Chief executive: Bart Van der Roost
- Company manager: Kiki Vervloessem

Artistic staff
- Artistic director: Sidi Larbi Cherkaoui
- Ballet mistress: Joëlle Auspert, Gabor Kapin, Olivier Patey
- Resident choreographers: Sidi Larbi Cherkaoui; Pina Bausch, William Forsythe, Hans van Manen, Akram Khan, Ohad Naharin, Marcia Haydée, Crystal Pite, Edouard Lock, Demis Volpi, Jaroen Verbruggen,
- Former Deputy Director: Tamas Moricz

Other
- Official school: Royal Ballet School of Flanders
- Formation: Principals; Soloists; Corps de Ballet

The Royal Ballet of Flanders is a dance company based in Antwerp, Belgium, specializing in classical, neoclassical and contemporary ballet. In its current incarnation, the company was established in 1969. It tours internationally.

== History ==
The current Royal Ballet of Flanders was established by Belgium's federal Ministry of Dutch Culture in 1969. Previously, Belgium had two professional classical ballet companies, the Royal Ballet of Flanders and Ballet royal de Wallonie. The Ballet royale de Wallonie, founded in 1966, was brought under the direction of Frédéric Flamand in 1991, who renamed the company Charleroi/Danse and shifted the focus of the troupe entirely onto modern dance.

Jeanne Brabants was the founder and original artistic director of the Royal Ballet of Flanders. She was succeeded as artistic director by Rus Valery Panov, then Robert Denvers.

In September 2012, Assis Carreiro was appointed artistic director of the Royal Ballet of Flanders and since her arrival has commissioned and produced works by Wayne McGregor, Jacopo Godani, Edward Clug, Glen Tetley, Ashley Page, among others. Previous Artistic Director Kathryn Bennetts took her post in 2005 and raised the company's international profile by adding contemporary works including those of William Forsythe to its repertoire and touring more extensively. Winning the Laurence Olivier Award for Outstanding Achievement in Dance in the category Dance Companies under her direction in 2009 as well as the London Circle Critics National Dance Award in 2012 for Outstanding company during her last season made the company an award-winning company, it has since been described as "today one of the best companies in Europe".

In the 2014 New Year Honours list, Assis Carreiro was appointed a MBE by Queen Elizabeth II of the United Kingdom.

In September 2015 Antwerp based choreographer Sidi Larbi Cherkaoui took the new artistic directorship, along with co-director Tamas Moricz (William Forsythe dancer). Together they became the new artistic co-directors to a reforming Ballet of Flanders under the new aegis of the opera ballet Kunsthuis. The company repertoire has been since shifting to a predominantly contemporary mix of dance works, focusing on new works by Cherkaoui and touring.

== The company ==
The Royal Ballet of Flanders is a collective ensemble organised without any ranking. Its dancers for the 2025/26 season are:

- Charles Antoni
- Louiza Avraam
- Janne Boere
- Yannis Brissot
- Pauline Callebaut
- Morgana Cappellari
- Brent Daneels
- Yaiza Davilla Gómez
- Anaïs De Caster
- Gloria De Meester
- Marine Garcia
- Samatha Hines
- Towa Iwase
- Matthew Johnson
- Ausia Jones
- Aleix Labara i Cerver
- David Ledger
- Philipe Lens
- Valeria Marangelli
- Lisa Mariani
- Cassandra Martín
- Allison McGuire
- Austin Meiteen
- Ester Pérez
- Flavio Quisisana
- Taichi Sakai
- Willem-Jan Sas
- Niharika Senapati
- Gaetano Signorelli
- Saul Vega Mendoza
- Rune Verbilt
- Madison Vomastek
- Lateef Williams

== Notable former dancers ==
- Bernice Coppieters
- Drew Jacoby
- Lorena Feijóo
- Nancy Osbaldeston
- Karina Jäger-von Stülpnagel

== See also ==
- Belgian culture
- Ballet companies
- Flemish culture
