= Kathryn Bennetts =

Australian ballet dancer and director

Kathryn Bennetts is an Australian former ballet dancer and now artistic director.

Kathryn Bennetts was born in Sydney, and trained at the Scully-Borovansky School of Ballet, followed by the Australian Ballet School in Melbourne.

From 2005 to 2012, Bennetts was artistic director of the Royal Ballet of Flanders.

For the ballets 'Sleeping Beauty' and 'Onegin' (both 2012) she received from Klassiek Centraal (Flemish/Dutch internet magazine) a 'Gouden Label' (Golden Label).
