= Jean-Christophe Maillot =

French dancer and choreographer (born 1960)

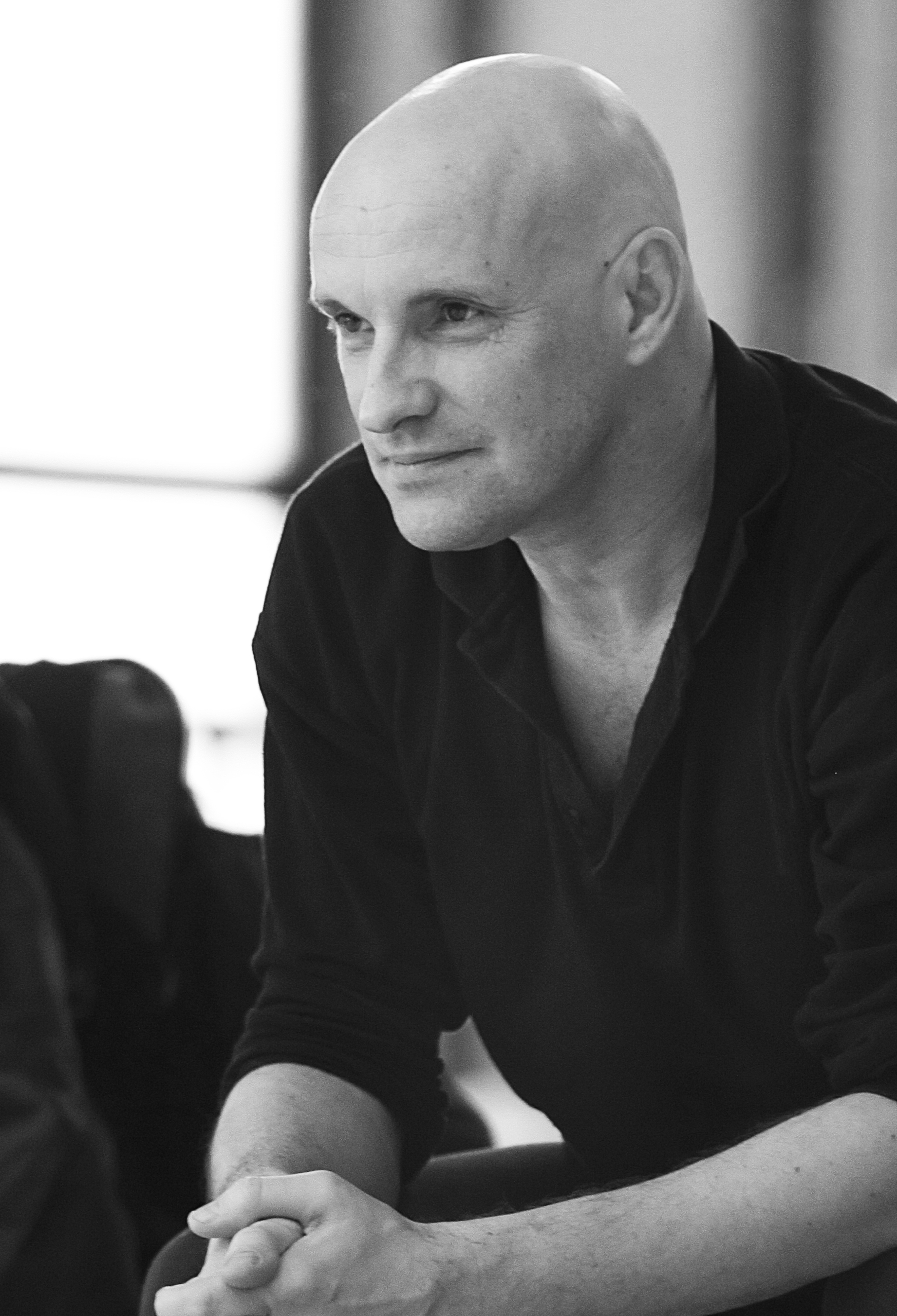

Jean-Christophe Maillot (born 1960) is a Monaco-based, French-born dancer and choreographer. He has been the choreographer-director of Les Ballets de Monte-Carlo since 1993.

== Early life and education ==
Maillot was born in Tours. He studied at the dance conservatory in Tours before enrolling at the École supérieure de danse de Cannes Rosella Hightower, where Rosella Hightower was his primary teacher.

== Career ==
Maillot was invited by John Neumeier to join the Hamburg Ballet in 1978, where he became a soloist and stayed until 1983, when an accident ended his career as a dancer.

In 1983, he became the choreographer and director of the Ballet du Grand Théâtre in Tours. Since 1993, on the appointment of Caroline, Princess of Hanover, he has been the artistic director of Les Ballets de Monte Carlo.

He helped Princess Caroline design the bridesmaids' costumes at the wedding of her brother.

In 2000, 2012 and 2023 was a head of a jury at Prix de Lausanne ballet competitions.

== Works ==
Works created for Les Ballets des Monte-Carlo: Bêtes Noires; Home, Sweet Home; Dov’è la Luna; Vers un Pays Sage; Roméo et Juliette; Recto Verso; L’Île; Cendrillon; Entrelacs; Oeil pour oeil; La Belle; D’une rive à l’autre; Miniatures; Le Songe; Altro Canto; Casse-Noisette Circus (2000). For the Bolshoi Theater, he created The Taming of The Shrew.

- 1987 : Le Mandarin Merveilleux
- 1989 : Über die Winterreise
- 1989 : Du haut de ...
- 1991 : L'enfant et les sortilèges
- 1993 : Bêtes noires
- 1993 : Lueurs d'amour
- 1993 : Thème et quatre variation
- 1994 : Home Sweet Home
- 1994 : Dov'e la Luna
- 1995 : Ubuaha
- 1995 : Vers un pays sage
- 1996 : Concert d'anges
- 1996 : Roméo et Juliette
- 1997 : Duo d'anges
- 1997 : Recto verso
- 1997 : In volo
- 1998 : L'Île
- 1999 : Cendrillon
- 1999 : Casse-noisette circus
- 2000 : Opus 40
- 2000 : Entrelacs
- 2001 : Œil pour œil
- 2001 : La Belle
- 2002 : Men's Dance
- 2003 : D'une rive à l'autre
- 2003 : Noces
- 2004 : Miniatures
- 2005 : Le Songe
- 2006 : Altro canto I
- 2007 : Faust
- 2008 : Altro Canto II
- 2009 : Schéhérazade
- 2009 : Men's Dance for Women
- 2009 : Fauves
- 2010 : Daphnis et Chloé
- 2011 : Opus 50
- 2011 : Lac
- 2013 : Choré
- 2013 : Casse-Noisette Compagnie
- 2014 : La Mégère Apprivoisée - Ballet du Théâtre Bolchoï
- 2015 : Presque Rien
- 2016 : Aleatorio
- 2017 : La Mégère Apprivoisée

== Distinctions and awards ==
- 1977: Prix de Lausanne
- 1992: Knighthood of the Ordre des Arts et des Lettres
- 1999: Officer of the Order of Cultural Merit of Monaco
- 2001: Nijinski Award for Best Choreography for the production of La Belle
- 2002: Knighthood of the Légion d'honneur
- 2008: Prix Benois de la Danse, Choreographer of the Year 2007, for Faust
- 2015: Commander of the Order of Arts and Letters
- 2018: Prix de Lausanne Life Time Achievement Award

== Personal life ==
He and his wife, Valentine, have three children, born between 1986 and 1992. His daughter, Juliette Dol, is a French actress.

== Book ==
- Maillot, Jean-Christophe (2024). La danse en festin. Gallimard/Les Ballets de Monte-Carlo. ISBN 9782073029942.
