= Les Ballets de Monte-Carlo =

Ballet company in Monaco

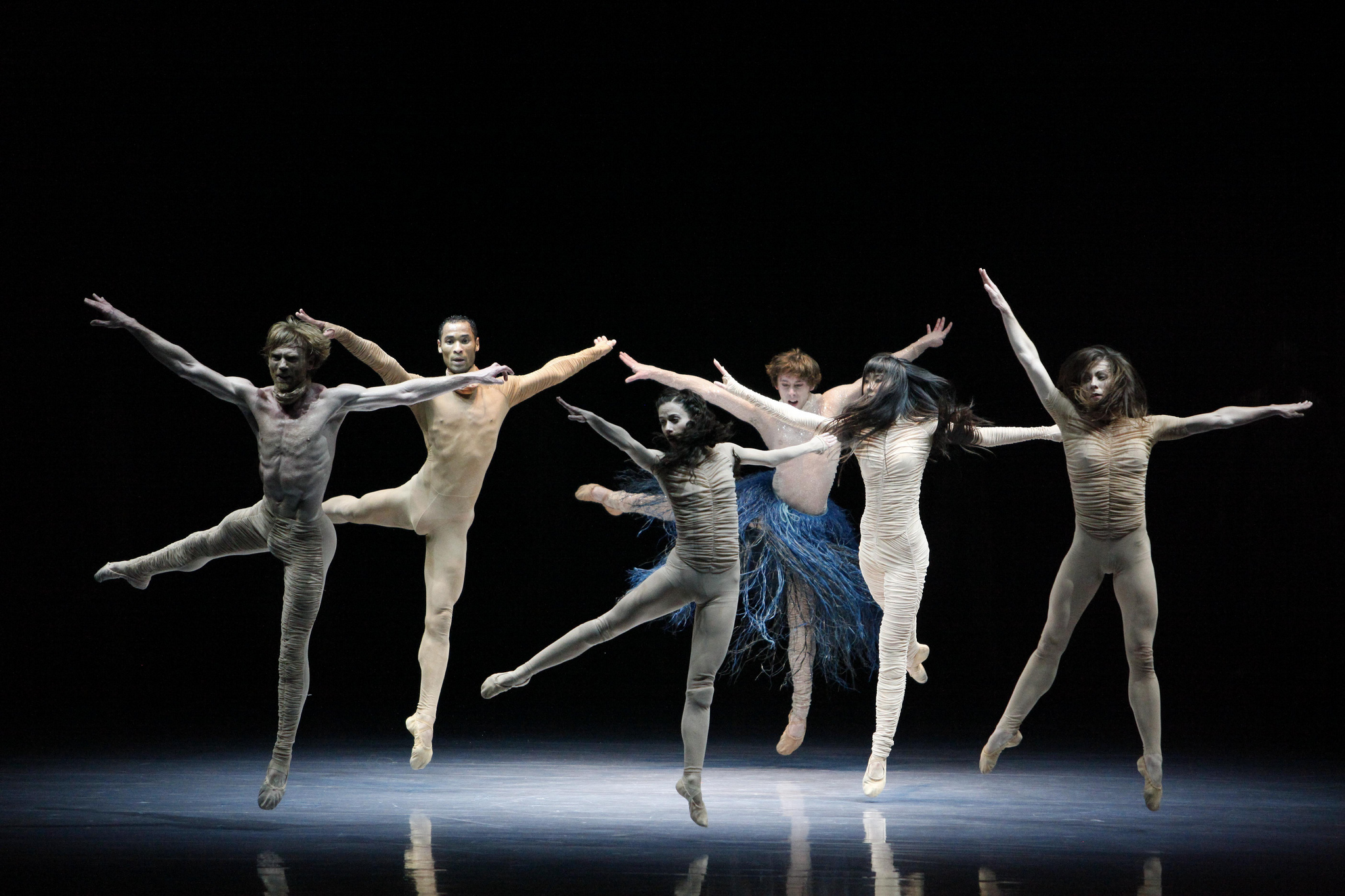

Les Ballets de Monte-Carlo (The Monte Carlo Ballet) is a classical ballet company established in 1985 by Caroline, Princess of Hanover in accordance with the wishes of her mother, Princess Grace of Monaco. It is the national company of the Principality of Monaco.

== History ==
The first performance took place on 21 December 1985, casting among others several guest stars of the Paris Opera. Directed by Ghislaine Thesmar and Pierre Lacotte, the company rehearsed in the Diaghilev studio, performing on the stage of the Salle Garnier at the Opéra de Monte-Carlo and immediately started touring.

Their repertoire includes works from the Ballets Russes and contemporary pieces from guest choreographers such as Kevin Haigen, John Clifford, Jean-Christophe Maillot, Dieter Ammann, and Uwe Scholz. In 1989, Jean-Yves Esquerre became artistic director, after the departure of Ghislaine Thesmar and Pierre Lacotte one year earlier.

In 1992, Jean-Christophe Maillot joined the company, first as artistic consultant, and was officially promoted to the rank of director-choreographer in September 1993. Four years later, thanks to his vision and energy, the Ballets de Monte-Carlo left the building that had been their historical home, which had by then become too small, and moved into their own dance center, l'Atelier. Furthermore, in December 2000, they inaugurated their first ballet season on the huge stage of the Salle des Princes at the brand new congress center in Monaco, the Grimaldi Forum. These were two turning points in the modern history of the company and the beginning of a new dance era in Monaco.
