= List of compositions by Peter Warlock =

Peter Warlock was the pseudonym adopted by the British composer and music scholar Philip Arnold Heseltine (1894–1930). He wrote over a hundred songs, a number of choral works and a small number of instrumental pieces. His general style has been summarised by his biographer Barry Smith as "an idiosyncratic harmonic language that comprise[s] an unusual mixture of Edwardiana, Delius, Van Dieren, Elizabethan and folk music, features that give his music a strongly personal voice". In addition to his own compositions he made transcriptions of Elizabethan and Jacobean vocal solo, choral, and instrumental works, and prepared an edition of Henry Purcell's string fantasias.

For choral works the acronym "SATB" (Soprano-Alto-Tenor-Bass) has been used to indicate the voice composition of the work. Divisions of individual voice parts are indicated by "SSAA..." etc.

1. SONGS (with pianoforte accompaniment)
Year	Title/First line	Words by	Vocal/choral forces	Instrumental forces	Notes
1911	The Wind from the West	Ella Young			
1911	A Lake and a Fairy Boat	Thomas Hood			
1911	Music, when soft voices die	Percy Bysshe Shelley			2 versions
1915	The Everlasting Voices	W. B. Yeats			
1916	The Cloths of Heaven	W. B. Yeats			Revised 1919
1916–17	Saudades: 1. Along the Stream	Li Po			
1916–17	Saudades: 2. Take, O take those lips away	William Shakespeare			
1916–17	Saudades: 3. Heraclitus	Callimachus			
1917	The Water Lily	Robert Nichols			
1917	I asked a thief to steal me a peach	William Blake			2 versions
1918	Bright is the ring of words	Robert Louis Stevenson			
1918	To the Memory of a Great Singer	Robert Louis Stevenson			Revised 1922
1918	Take, O take those lips away	William Shakespeare			2nd setting
1918	As ever I saw				
1918	My gostly fader	Charles, Duke of Orléans			
1918	The bayley berith the bell away				
1918	Whenas the rye	George Peele			
?1918	Dedication	Philip Sydney			
?1918–19	Love for Love				
?1918–19	My sweet little darling				
?1918–19	Sweet Content	Thomas Dekker			
?1919	Balulalow	Martin Luther (scottish translation of "Vom Himmel hoch, da komm ich her," in the 1567 second edition of The Gude and Godlie Ballatis)			
1919	Mourne no Moe	John Fletcher			
1919	Romance	Robert Louis Stevenson			
?1919	There is a Lady				
1920	Play Acting				
1921	Captain Stratton's Fancy	John Masefield			
1921	Mr Belloc's Fancy	J. C. Squire			2 versions
1921–22	Late Summer	Edward Shanks			
1922	Good Ale				
1922	Hey troly loly lo				
1922	The Bachelor				
1922	Piggesnie				
1922	Little Trotty Wagtail	John Clare			
1922	The Singer	Edward Shanks			
1922	Adam lay ybounden				
1922	Rest sweet nymphs				
1922	Sleep	John Fletcher			
1922	Tyrley Tyrlow				
1922	Lillygay: The Distracted Maid; Johnny wi' the Tye; The Shoemaker; Burd Ellen and Young Tamlane; Rantum Tantum	V. B. Neuburg			
1922	Peterisms, set I: Chopcherry	George Peele			
1922	Peterisms, set I: A Sad Song	John Fletcher			
1922	Peterisms, set I: Rutterkin	John Skelton			
1922–23	Peterisms, set II: Roister Doister	N. Udall			
1922–23	Peterisms, set II: Spring	Thomas Nashe			
1922–23	Peterisms, set II:Lusty Juventus	Robert Wever			
1922	In an arbour green				
1922	Autumn Twilight	Arthur Symons			
1923	Milkmaids	John Smith			
1923	Candlelight (12 nursery rhymes)				
1923	Jenny Gray				
1923	I held love's head	Robert Herrick			
1923	Thou gav'st me leave to kiss	Robert Herrick			
1923	Consider	Ford Madox Ford			
1924	Twelve Oxen				
1924	The Toper's Song				
1924	Sweet and Twenty	William Shakespeare			
1924	Peter Warlock's Fancy				
1924	Yarmouth Fair	H. Collins			
1924	I have a garden	Thomas Moore			Revised from 1910
1925	Chanson du jour de Noel	Clément Marot			
1925	Pretty Ring Time	William Shakespeare			
1925	A Prayer to St Anthony	Arthur Symons			
1925	The Sick Heart	Arthur Symons			
1926	The Countryman	J. Chalkhill			
1926	Maltworms	W. Stevenson			With E. J. Moeran
1926	The Birds	Hilaire Belloc			
1926	Robin Goodfellow				
1926	Jillian of Berry	Francis Beaumont and John Fletcher			
1926	Away to Twiver				
1926	Fair and True	Nicholas Breton			
1927	Ha'nacker Mill	Hilaire Belloc			
1927	The Night	Hilaire Belloc			
1927	My Own Country	Hilaire Belloc			
1927	The First Mercy	Bruce Blunt			
1927	The Lover's Maze	Thomas Campion			
1927	Cradle Song	John Phillip			
1927	Sigh no more ladies	William Shakespeare			
1927	Walking the Woods				
1927	Mockery	William Shakespeare			
1927	The Jolly Shepherd				
1928	Queen Anne				
1928	Passing by				
1928	The Passionate Shepherd	Christopher Marlowe			Seven Songs of Summer No. 1
1928	The Contented Lover	trans J. Mabbe			Seven Songs of Summer No. 2
1928	Youth	Robert Wever			Seven Songs of Summer No. 3
1928	The Sweet o' the Year	William Shakespeare			Seven Songs of Summer No. 4
1928	Tom Tyler				Seven Songs of Summer No. 5
1928	Elore Lo				Seven Songs of Summer No. 6
1928	The Droll Lover				Seven Songs of Summer No. 7
1928	And wilt thou leave me thus?	Thomas Wyatt			
1928	The Cricketers of Hambledon	Bruce Blunt			First performed by The Hambledon Band on 1 Jan 1929 at a charity cricket match at Broadhalfpenny Down.
1928	Fill the Cup, Philip				
1929	The Frostbound Wood	Bruce Blunt			
1930	After Two Years	Richard Aldington			
1930	The Fox	Bruce Blunt			
1930	Bethlehem Down	Bruce Blunt			Revision of 1927 choral version
2. CHORAL WORKS (unaccompanied unless specified)
Year	Title/First line	Words by	Vocal/choral forces	Instrumental forces	Notes
1916	The Full Heart	Robert Nichols	Soprano solo SSAATTBB chorus		Revised 1921
1918	As Dewe in Aprylle,		SSAATBB chorus		
1918	Benedicamus Domino		SSAATTBB chorus		
1918	Cornish Christmas Carol	Henry Jenner	SSAATTBB chorus		
1918	Kanow Kernow	Henry Jenner	SSAATB chorus		
1919	Corpus Christi		Alto and tenor solos SSAATBB chorus		
1923	Tyrley Tyrlow (carol)		SATB chorus	Orchestra	
1923	Balulalow (carol)		Soprano solo SATB chorus	String orchestra	
1923	The Sycamore Tree (carol)		SATB chorus	Orchestra	
1925	One More River		Baritone solo TTBB chorus	Pianoforte	
1925	The Lady's Birthday		Baritone solo ATTB chorus	Pianoforte	
1925	The Spring of the Year	Allan Cunningham	SATB chorus		
1923–25	Dirge: All the flowers of spring	John Webster	SSAATTBB chorus		
1923–25	Dirge: Call for the Robin Redbreast	John Webster	SSAA chorus		
1923–25	Dirge: The Shrouding of the Duchess of Malfi	John Webster	TTBB chorus		
1927	Bethlehem Down	Bruce Blunt	SATB chorus		Song version 1930
1927	I saw a fair maiden		SATTB chorus		
1927	What Cheer? Good Cheer!		Unison chorus		
1927	Where Riches is Everlastingly		SATB soli Unison chorus	Organ	
1928	The Rich Cavalcade	Frank Kendon		SATB chorus	
1928	The First Mercy	Bruce Blunt	SSA chorus	Pianoforte	Arrangement of 1927 song
1928	The bayley berith the bell away		Two voices	Pianoforte	Arrangement of 1927 song
1929	The Five Lesser Joys of Mary	D. L. Kelleher	Unison chorus	Organ	
1930	Carillon Carilla	Hilaire Belloc	SATB chorus	Organ	
3. VOCAL with Chamber accompaniment
Year	Title/First line	Words by	Vocal/choral forces	Instrumental forces	Notes
1919	My lady is a pretty one		Solo voice	String quartet	
1920–22	The Curlew	W.B. Yeats	Tenor solo	Flute, Cor Anglais, String quartet	Cycle of four songs
1927	Corpus Christi		Soprano and baritone voices	String quartet	Revision of 1919 choral version
1926–27	Sorrow's Lullaby	Thomas Lovell Beddoes	Soprano and baritone voices	String quartet	
1927	My little sweet darling		Solo voice	String quartet	Unpublished revision of 1919 song
1930	The Fairest May		Solo voice	String quartet	Revision of 1922 song
Undated	Pretty Ring Time	William Shakespeare			Unpublished revision of 1925 song
4. INSTRUMENTAL WORKS
Year	Title/First line	Words by	Vocal/choral forces	Instrumental forces	Notes
1916–17	Four Codpieces			Pianoforte	
1917	A Chinese Ballet			Pianoforte	Unpublished
1917	An Old Song			Small orchestra	
1917	The Old Codger			Pianoforte	Unpub. parody on Franck's D minor Symphony
1918	Folk Song Preludes			Pianoforte	
1921–22	Serenade			String Orchestra	
1926	Capriol Suite			Piano duet or string orchestra or full orchestra	
Undated	Row well ye Mariners			Pianoforte	Unpublished
