= If on a Winter's Night... =

Album by Sting

Studio album by Sting
- Released: 26 October 2009
- Genre: Pop, folk, classical
- Length: 50:18; With Bonus Tracks: 59:16
- Label: Deutsche Grammophon; Cherrytree
- Producer: Robert Sadin, Sting

Sting chronology
Songs from the Labyrinth (2006)	If on a Winter's Night... (2009)	Symphonicities (2010)

Professional ratings
Aggregate scores
Source	Rating
Metacritic	43/100
Review scores
Source	Rating
AllMusic	2.5/5 stars
Billboard	(favorable)
The Boston Globe	(positive)
The Guardian	1/5 stars
The Independent	3/5 stars
NU.nl	7/10 stars
Q	2/5 stars
The Times	3/5 stars
Uncut	2/5 stars

If on a Winter's Night... is the ninth studio album from British musician Sting. The album is a collection of Christmas and winter-themed songs mostly written by others, including folk songs, madrigals and religious hymns from past centuries. Dozens of musicians appear on the album in various configurations, including jazz, folk and classical players.

It was released in most countries on 26 October 2009, on 27 October 2009 in the United States and 2 November 2009 in the United Kingdom. The album was released in several formats: vinyl LP, a single-disc CD, a limited edition CD and making-of DVD entitled The Genesis of 'If on a Winter's Night...' in Six Chapters in hardback book packaging, an Amazon exclusive version, as well as various import editions (of note is the Japanese edition). The limited edition and Amazon exclusive both include bonus songs; the Japanese edition includes them as well but adds "The Coventry Carol." The album includes a reworking of "The Hounds of Winter" from his album Mercury Falling.

The title of the album is based on the novel If on a winter's night a traveler by Italo Calvino.

== Track listing ==
If on a Winter's Night... track listing
No.	Title	Writer(s)	Length
1.	"Gabriel's Message"	Traditional	2:32
2.	"Soul Cake"	Paul Stookey, Tracey Batteast, Elena Mezetti	3:26
3.	"There Is No Rose of Such Virtue"	Anonymous	4:01
4.	"The Snow It Melts the Soonest"	Traditional	3:42
5.	"Christmas at Sea"	Poem by Robert Louis Stevenson, music by Sting, Mary Macmaster	4:34
6.	"Lo, How a Rose E'er Blooming"	Music by Michael Praetorius, English translation by Theodore Baker	2:40
7.	"Cold Song"	Music by Henry Purcell, lyrics by John Dryden	3:14
8.	"The Burning Babe"	Music by Chris Wood, lyrics by Robert Southwell	2:46
9.	"Now Winter Comes Slowly"	Music by Henry Purcell, lyrics by Thomas Betterton	3:04
10.	"The Hounds of Winter"	Sting	5:45
11.	"Balulalow"	Music by Peter Warlock, lyrics traditional	3:08
12.	"The Cherry-Tree Carol"	Traditional	3:10
13.	"Lullaby for an Anxious Child"	Music and lyrics by Sting and Dominic Miller	2:52
14.	"The Hurdy-Gurdy Man"	Music by Franz Schubert, poem by Wilhelm Müller, adapted by Sting	2:48
15.	"You Only Cross My Mind in Winter"	Music by J. S. Bach, lyrics by Sting	2:36

Bonus tracks
No.	Title	Writer(s)	Length
16.	"Bethlehem Down"	Peter Warlock and Bruce Blunt	2:56
17.	"Blake's Cradle Song"	Music by Vaughan Williams, poem by William Blake	3:29
18.	"The Coventry Carol"		2:33

== Personnel ==
=== Musicians ===
- Sting – vocals, arrangements, lute (3), guitars (5, 8, 10, 11, 12, 14), snare drum (5), percussion (2, 8, 10, 17)
- David Hartley – harmonium (3)
- Julian Sutton – melodeon (6, 8, 10, 13, 14)
- David Sancious – organ (10)
- Dominic Miller – guitars (1, 4, 5, 7, 10, 13, 17)
- Dean Parks – guitars (2), mandolin (2)
- David Mansfield – mandolin (2, 8), 12-string guitar (5), lap dulcimer (5, 8), mandocello (8)
- Edin Karamazov – lute (15)
- Ira Coleman – bass (1, 2, 4, 5, 8, 9, 13, 15)
- Kenny Garrett – soprano saxophone (8)
- Chris Dudley – trombone (2)
- Ibrahim Maalouf – trumpet (1)
- Chris Gekker – trumpet (2)
- Brent Madsen – trumpet (2)
- Chris Botti – trumpet (11, 17)
- Leslie Neish – tuba (2)
- Marcus Rojas – tuba (2)
- John Clark – French horn (2)
- Bassam Saba – ney (3), oud (3)
- John Ellis – bass clarinet (7, 10)
- Daphna Mor – recorder (7)
- Mary Macmaster – harp (5, 8, 13, 17), vocals (5)
- Dov Scheindlin – viola (9)
- Kathryn Tickell – violin (2, 5, 6, 8, 10, 13), Northumbrian smallpipes (6)
- Peter Tickell – violin (2)
- Svetlana Tsovena – violin (7)
- Daniel Hope – violin (9, 14, 17)
- Vincent Ségal – cello (6, 7, 8, 10, 11, 13, 17)
- Melissa Meell – cello (9)
- Charles Curtis – cello (11)
- Robert Sadin – arrangements, string conductor (6, 11, 15, 16), percussion (7), soundscape (9)
- Allen Bluestein – string contractor (6, 11, 15, 16)
- Strings of the Musica Aeterna Orchestra – strings (6, 11, 15, 16)
- Joe Sumner – backing vocals (2, 3)
- The Webb Sisters – backing vocals (2, 3)
- Stile Antico – vocal ensemble (6)
- Lisa Fischer – backing vocals (8, 11), vocals (10)
- Jasmine Thomas – backing vocals (11)
- Jack DeJohnette – drums (8)
- Daniel Druckman – snare drum (8, 11)
- Cyro Baptista – percussion (1, 8, 10, 13, 17)
- Bijan Chemirani – percussion (3, 10)
- Daniel Freedman – percussion (3)
- Rhani Krija – percussion (3)
- Donald Hay – percussion (5)
- Bashiri Johnson – percussion (5, 10), frame drum (11)

=== Production ===
- Sting – producer, mixing
- Robert Sadin – producer, mixing (1, 3–17)
- David Darlington – engineer, mixing (1, 3–17)
- Clark Germain – engineer
- Donal Hodgson – engineer, mixing (2)
- Tim Mitchell – additional engineer, assistant engineer
- Todd Whitelock – additional engineer
- Mark Crowley – assistant engineer
- Joshua Cutsinger – assistant engineer
- Martin Hollis – assistant engineer
- Royce Jeffres – assistant engineer
- Adam Miller – assistant engineer
- Mark Wilder – mastering (1, 3–15)
- Maria Triana – mastering assistant (1, 3–15)
- Bob Ludwig – mastering (2)
- Dave Sandford – production coordinator
- Dana Wise – production coordinator
- Joseph Hutchinson – package design, artwork
- Jim & Anne Gable – Executive Producers, Directors: "If on a Winter's Night", Recording Studio Documentary Film
- Tony Molina Filmworks – LP photography cover, LP liner notes package photography. Director of Photography "If on a Winter's Night" Documentary Film.

Studios

- Recorded at Steerpike Studio (Wiltshire, England); Villa Il Palagio (Florence, Italy); The Source (Malibu, Florida); Clinton Recording Studio, Manhattan Center Studios and Seven Seas Studio (New York City, New York).
- Mixed at Steerpike Studio; Villa Il Palagio; Clinton Recording Studio, Burning Kite Digital and Bass Hit Studios (New York City, New York).
- Tracks 1 and 3–17 mastered at Battery Studios (New York City, New York); Track 2 mastered at Gateway Mastering (Portland, Maine).

== Charts ==
=== Weekly charts ===
Weekly chart performance for If on a Winter's Night...
Chart (2009–2010)	Peak position
Australian Albums (ARIA)	58
Austrian Albums (Ö3 Austria)	12
Belgian Albums (Ultratop Flanders)	7
Belgian Albums (Ultratop Wallonia)	5
Danish Albums (Hitlisten)	29
Dutch Albums (Album Top 100)	10
Finnish Albums (Suomen virallinen lista)	7
French Albums (SNEP)	8
German Albums (Offizielle Top 100)	5
Greek Albums (IFPI)	11
Hungarian Albums (MAHASZ)	8
Irish Albums (IRMA)	24
Italian Albums (FIMI)	4
Norwegian Albums (VG-lista)	18
Polish Albums (OLiS)	1
Portuguese Albums (AFP)	25
Scottish Albums (OCC)	17
Spanish Albums (Promusicae)	18
Swedish Albums (Sverigetopplistan)	12
Swiss Albums (Schweizer Hitparade)	13
UK Albums (OCC)	15
US Billboard 200	6
US Top Classical Albums (Billboard)	1

=== Year-end charts ===
2009 year-end chart performance for If on a Winter's Night...
Chart (2009)	Position
Belgian Albums (Ultratop Flanders)	80
Belgian Albums (Ultratop Wallonia)	92
French Albums (SNEP)	69
German Albums (Offizielle Top 100)	99
Polish Albums (ZPAV)	2
US Top Classical Albums (Billboard)	5

2010 year-end chart performance for If on a Winter's Night...
Chart (2010)	Position
Belgian Albums (Ultratop Wallonia)	68
French Albums (SNEP)	186
German Albums (Offizielle Top 100)	93
Swiss Albums (Schweizer Hitparade)	96
US Billboard 200	90
US Top Classical Albums (Billboard)	2

== Certifications ==
Certifications for If on a Winter's Night...
Region	Certification	Certified units/sales
Belgium (BRMA)	Gold	15,000^{*}
Canada (Music Canada)	Gold	40,000^{^}
France (SNEP)	Platinum	100,000^{*}
Germany (BVMI)	Gold	100,000^{^}
Hungary (MAHASZ)	Platinum	6,000^{^}
Italy (FIMI)	2× Platinum	140,000^{*}
Poland (ZPAV)	4× Platinum	80,000^{*}
Switzerland (IFPI Switzerland)	Gold	15,000^{^}
United Kingdom (BPI)	Silver	60,000^{*}
United States (RIAA)	Gold	544,000
^{*} Sales figures based on certification alone.^{^} Shipments figures based on certification alone.

== See also ==
- List of Billboard Top Holiday Albums number ones of the 2000s
