= Percy Scholes =

English musician and writer (1877–1958)

Percy Alfred Scholes OBE FSA FRHistS
- Born: 24 July 1877; Leeds, England
- Died: 31 July 1958 (aged 81); Vevey, Switzerland
- Occupation: Musician
- Notable work: The Oxford Companion to Music (1938)
- Awards: James Tait Black Memorial Prize (1948)

Percy Alfred Scholes (pronounced skolz; 24 July 1877 – 31 July 1958) was an English musician, journalist, vegetarianism activist and prolific writer, whose best-known achievement was his compilation of the first edition of the Oxford Companion to Music. His 1948 biography The Great Dr Burney was awarded the James Tait Black Memorial Prize.

== Career ==
Scholes was born in Headingley, Leeds in 1877, the third of six children of Thomas Scholes, a commercial agent and Katharine Elizabeth Pugh. He was educated privately, owing to his poor health as a child. He became an organist, schoolteacher, music journalist, lecturer, an Inspector of Music in Schools to London University and the Organist and Music Master of Kent College, Canterbury (1900), All Saints, Vevey, Switzerland (1902) as well as Kingswood College, Grahamstown, South Africa (1904). He was Registrar at the City of Leeds (Municipal) School of Music (1908–1912). In 1908 he married Dora Wingate, a talented pianist. That year he founded the magazine The Music Student in 1908 (renamed The Music Teacher in 1921), and continued as its editor until 1920. During the First World War he directed the Music section of the YMCA for troops at home and abroad.

At various times Scholes was music critic for the Evening Standard (1913-1920), The Observer (1920–1925) (immediately following Ernest Newman's departure) and the Radio Times (1923–1929). From 1923 up until 1928 (when he departed for Switzerland) he was making regular music appreciation broadcasts on BBC radio.

He was made an Officer of the Star of Rumania in 1930 and a Fellow of the Royal Society of Antiquaries in 1938. He was founder and general secretary of the Anglo-American Conference on Musical Education, Lausanne (1929 and 1931). Scholes and his wife came back to the UK in 1940, but with his health in decline they returned to Switzerland at the end of 1956. He ended his days in Cornaux, Chamby sur Montreux.

Scholes' oldest brother Ernest Frederick Pugh Scholes (1868–1966) was a Methodist missionary and vegetarian who lived to the age of 98.

Scholes was awarded the OBE in the 1956 New Year's Honours List for his music contributions.

== Work ==
Scholes wrote more than 30 books, mainly concerning music appreciation. His best-known work is The Oxford Companion to Music, which was first published in 1938. Like Grove's Dictionary of Music and Musicians (1878–89) the Companion sought to reach out beyond professional musicians to the amateur as well. This work took him six years to produce and consisted of over a million words (surpassing the length of the Bible). Scholes was assisted by various clerical assistants, but wrote virtually all the text himself. The only exceptions were the article on tonic sol-fa (for which he was dissatisfied with his own article) and the synopses of the plots of operas (which he regarded as too boring). Although the Oxford Companion to Music was (and is) regarded as authoritative, the text of the first edition is enlivened by Scholes' own anecdotal and sometimes quirky style.

He was also the author of Puritans and Music in England and New England: A Contribution to the Cultural History of Two Nations (1934). In 1947, he produced the two volume, 960 page The Mirror of Music, compiling, enlarging and commenting on material published in The Musical Times between 1844 and 1944.

Scholes was deeply concerned with connecting music with a wider audience through musical appreciation in the tradition of Dr Burney, an influence he cited himself and the subject of his biography in 1948. Frank Howes (writing as "Our Music Critic" in The Times) called The Listener's Guide to Music (1919) "that masterpiece of simplification". He recognised very early the possibilities of the gramophone as an aid to knowledge and understanding of music. His First Book of the Gramophone Record (1924) lists fifty records of music from the sixteenth to the twentieth century, with a commentary on each; a Second Book followed in 1925. From 1930 onwards, Scholes collaborated with the Columbia Graphophone Company in The Columbia History of Music by Ear and Eye; this comprised five volumes, each containing an explanatory booklet and eight 78 rpm records specially made for the series, including Renaissance vocal and instrumental items performed by Arnold Dolmetsch and his family.

He also worked on the innovative 'AudioGraphic' project for the Aeolian Company creating richly annotated player-piano (pianola) rolls, having joined as Secretary the Honorary Advisory Committee on the Use of Piano-Player Rolls in Education, chaired by Sir Alexander Mackenzie, in 1925. The AudioGraphic rolls were printed with music biographical and analytical commentary material and illustrations including woodcuts, photographs of drama and opera productions, and paintings, which could occupy over two metres of the roll. These rolls were issued in England from around 1926 to 1929 and America from 1927 to 1930.

== Style and temperament ==
"Nothing he put out was ever 'ghosted'; all bore the individual stamp of the salty P.A.S style," wrote W. R. Anderson in 1958. In his writing for this work, and elsewhere, Scholes never believed in holding back his personal views in favour of a neutral point of view. He is credited with the description of harpsichord music as sounding like "a toasting fork on a birdcage" [actually, he states that “the tone thus produced is a sort of agreeable twang.” The “toasting fork” description he ascribes to an “unappreciative English” humorist. The Oxford Companion to Music: Oxford University Press, 1938 and 1943, Second Printing 1945, p. 413]; when describing Handel and Bach, he said that "Handel was the more elegant composer, but Bach was the more thorough".

Scholes led the public denunciations of Arthur Eaglefield Hull when his book Music: Classical, Romantic and Modern (1927) was found to include material borrowed from other writers. How much of this was plagiarism and how much a mere careless, hasty failure to cite sources is not known, but the scandal left Hull very upset. He took his own life by throwing himself under a train at Huddersfield station on 4 November 1928. Scholes also made enemies amongst The Sackbut group which included Philip Heseltine and Ursula Greville. Scholes' criticism of Hubert Foss' Song-cycle on Poems of Thomas Hardy infuriated Heseltine, who sent Scholes abusive letters, took to telephoning him late at night, and circulated a petition seeking his sacking from the Observer. Scholes sought legal advice on this matter but took no action. Reviews of Christian Darnton's You and Music (1940) were generally positive until Scholes catalogued so many serious and obvious errors (such as “Binary form may be represented by A.B.A.”) that he presented the work as an elaborate joke to trap unwary reviewers.

In The Oxford Companion to Music some composers (Berg, Schönberg and Webern, for example) were described in somewhat unsympathetic and dismissive terms. His article on Jazz states that "jazz is to serious music as daily journalism is to serious writing"; similarly, his article on the composer John Henry Maunder states that Maunder's "seemingly inexhaustible cantatas, Penitence, Pardon and Peace and From Olivet to Calvary, long enjoyed popularity, and still aid the devotions of undemanding congregations in less sophisticated areas."

== Vegetarianism ==
Scholes was a patron of the League for the Prohibition of Cruel Sports. He was a strict vegetarian. Compton Mackenzie who dined with Scholes at the Savile Club noted that he ate two carrots for his dinner. He was a vice-president of the Vegetarian Society and the London Vegetarian Society.

Scholes authored two booklets on vegetarianism, Some Aesthetic and Everyday Reflections on the Vegetarian System of Diet (1931) and Why I am a Vegetarian (1948).

== Death and legacy ==
Scholes died in 1958, aged eighty-one, in Vevey, Switzerland, where he had been living for many years. Shortly before his death, his "professional" library was acquired by the National Library of Canada. This comprised approximately 50 linear metres of research files and correspondence.

His former assistant John Owen Ward revised the Tenth Edition of the Companion in 1970. Ward considered it "inappropriate to change radically the characteristic rich anecdotal quality of Dr. Scholes' style." and left much of Scholes' distinctive work intact. In 1983 Oxford University Press produced The New Oxford Companion to Music, edited by Denis Arnold, which consciously tried to overcome some of the perceived deficiencies of the Scholes' work. This included taking a more eclectic line on music to be included, and resulted in a two-volume work of some 2000 pages. The 2002 edition, edited by Alison Latham, reverted to the original title, and single-volume format.

== Publications ==
- Candidates Self Examiner in Scales, etc. (1907)
- The Music Student (ed). (1908 – 1921, later renamed The Music Teacher)
- Introduction to French Music (1917)
- Everyman and his Music (1917)
- An Introduction to British Music (1918)
- Listener’s Guide to Music (1919)
- Musical Appreciation in Schools (1920)
- Learning to Listen by Means of the Gramophone (1921)
- New works by modern British composers, Carnegie UK Trust (Series 1 and 2, 1921, 1924)
- Beginner’s Guide to Harmony (1922)
- The Book of the Great Musicians (1923)
- The First Book of the Gramophone Record (1924)
- The Appreciation of Music by Means of the Pianola and Duo-Art (1925)
- Everybody’s Guide to Broadcast Music (1925)
- Miniature History of Music (1928)
- Columbia History of Music Through Ear and Eye (1930, in five parts)
- Miniature History of Opera (1931)
- Some Aesthetic and Everyday Reflections on the Vegetarian System of Diet (1931)
- Practical Lesson Plans in Musical Appreciation by Means of the Gramophone (1933)
- Puritans and Music (1934)
- Music: the Child and the Masterpiece (1935)
- Radio Times Music Handbook (1935)
- Oxford Companion to Music (1938)
- God Save the King! Its History and Romance (1942)
- The Mirror of Music (1947)
- The Great Doctor Burney (1948)
- Why I am a Vegetarian (1948)
- The Concise Oxford Dictionary of Music (1952)
- The Life and Adventures of Sir John Hawkins (1953)
- Oxford Junior Companion to Music (1954)
- God Save the Queen! The History and Romance of the World's First National Anthem (1954)
