= Oswald Barrett =

English artist and illustrator

Oswald (Charles) Barrett (1892–1945) was an English artist and illustrator. He also signed his work with the pseudonym "Batt". He produced a wide range of drawings, illustrations and paintings, though is best known for biographical portraits of famous composers.

Barrett was born in Ramsgate, Kent in 1892, and died of leukemia in London in 1945, aged 53 years.

== Early life and education ==
Oswald Barrett was educated at St George's School in Ramsgate. His father was an authority on Oriental art, and the history of London. Before the First World War, Barrett studied at the Camden School of Art in London and began to publish work as a cartoonist. During the war, he served in the Royal West Kent regiment on the North West Frontier in India, where he made drawings of army life. He had training as a violinist, and during his time in the army he played in the regimental orchestra. After the war, he returned to study in London, at the Heatherley School of Art, and Goldsmiths College School of Art.

== Work ==
His career as an illustrator developed in the 1920s, with work appearing in periodicals and books. In 1930 he started to produce drawings for the BBC Radio Times magazine, illustrating articles, programmes, and portraits of famous people. In 1934, the first of the major portraits of composers were published. These proved to be extremely popular with readers, and special editions were produced which readers could purchase for framing.

Barrett also painted (in oils) for his own interest and experimentation, particularly country and mountain scenes.

In 1965, twenty years after his death, an exhibition of his musical work was held at the Royal Festival Hall in London, which included all of the Radio Times composer portraits.

== Portraits of composers and The Oxford Companion to Music ==
Barrett's composer portraits attracted the attention of Percy Scholes and Hubert Foss, music editors at the Oxford University Press. Barrett was asked to contribute portraits to The Oxford Companion to Music encyclopedia, the first edition of which appeared in 1938, and which remained in print in that form until the 1980s.

The composers depicted are: J. S. Bach, Beethoven, Brahms, Byrd, Chopin, Elgar, Handel, Haydn, Liszt, Mozart, Schubert, Schumann, Tchaikovsky, and Wagner. Each has a descriptive note by the artist, for example on the portrait "Beethoven nears the end":

He is seen in his workroom in the old Schwarzspanierhaus. Behind him stands his Graf piano, wrecked by his frantic efforts to hear his own playing. Odd coins lie scattered among the litter on his table. There are his eartrumpets, his conversation books—in which any visitor would have to write what he wished to say—with a carpenter's pencil, letters, quill pens, a broken coffee cup, remnants of food and his candlesticks. The squalid disorder meant nothing to him in those days. He had finished with the world. Since 1824 the medium of the string quartet had absorbed his mind to the exclusion of all else and now, stone-deaf, very ill but still indomitable, he rose to heights which even he had never reached before. His stormy life closed with a revelation which, in the last five quartets, was the crowning glory of his achievement.

Additionally, a colour reproduction of an oil painting titled "Beethoven in Middle Life" appears as a frontispiece to the book (note: this was omitted in some late printings of the book in the 1980s).

Barrett dedicated the portrait of Elgar to the composer's daughter, Carice Elgar Blake, in small writing in one corner.

The book's editor, Percy Scholes describes the creative process behind Barrett's portraits as follows:

interspersed with [the 'authentic' illustrations] is a series of portraits which might be called 'imaginative' or 'synthetic'—neither adjective, however, quite accurately representing their nature. They are a speciality of the artist Oswald Barrett ('Batt' of the Radio Times), and represent years of research, study, and profound thought on his part. He is an ardent music-lover and a deep student of the great masters, and his process has been to assemble (often by very prolonged correspondence with authorities in different parts of Europe) all the existing pictorial documents concerning those composers at different periods of their lives. This done, he has essayed the double task of producing a portrait that shall penetrate to the mind of the character represented and express his personality, and that shall also, by its circumstantial details (as to which, also, he has carried out a great deal of research), recall to us both the operative influences of his surroundings and the manner in which those surroundings represented his own nature. It is the conviction of all connected with this book that nothing of this sort previously seen has been so successful in achievement, and they gratefully record the fact that the frontispiece, a reproduction of an oil painting specially executed for the purpose, which they regard as the most revealing portrait of its subject in existence, is the artist's personal gift to the volume and testifies to his deep interest in it.
