= Noël Goodwin =

English arts critic and author (born 1927–2013)

- Goodwin from before 1960
- Born: Trevor Noël Goodwin; 25 December 1927 (age 98); Fowey, Cornwall, England, UK
- Died: 27 March 2013 (aged 85)
- Education: University of London (BA)
- Occupations: Music critic; dance critic; author
- Notable credits: Daily Express; The Times

Trevor Noël Goodwin (25 December 1927 – 27 March 2013) was an English music critic, dance critic and author who specialized in classical music and ballet. Described as having a "rare ability to write about music and dance with equal distinction", for 22 years Goodwin was Chief music and dance critic for the Daily Express. He held criticism posts at many English newspapers, including the News Chronicle, Truth and The Manchester Guardian among others; from 1978 to 1998 he also reviewed performances for The Times. Goodwin wrote an early history of the Scottish Ballet and was coauthor for two books: London Symphony: Portrait of an Orchestra with Hubert J. Foss and a Knight at the Opera with Geraint Evans.

== Life and career ==
Trevor Noël Goodwin was born on 25 December 1927 in Fowey, Cornwall, England, UK. (Note: Though Howes et al. 1960, p. 223 records his birth year as 1926, this is not corroborated in The Times 2013 or Kennedy & Kennedy 2013) Born to a seafaring family, Goodwin was sent to the Royal Merchant Navy School (now the Bearwood House) in Wokingham, following his father's death. He earned a Bachelor of Arts at the University of London.

In 1952, Goodwin received two posts in arts criticism: he was the assistant music critic of the News Chronicle until 1954 and Music Critic for Truth until 1956. From 1954 to 1955, Goodwin was also a critic for The Manchester Guardian. In 1956, Goodwin became chief music critic and chief dance critic for the Daily Express; he stayed there for 22 years, leaving the post in 1978. From then to 1998, Goodwin reviewed performances for The Times. Other publications Goodwin wrote for include: the New York Herald-Tribune (London dance critic), the Musical Courier, Opera News, Dancing Times, Dance and Dancers (music editor in 1964, associate editor in 1972), Music and Musicians (executive editor from 1963 to 1971).

The Times described Goodwin as having a "rare ability to write about music and dance with equal distinction". Reflecting on his role as a music critic, Goodwin said:

As a music critic in daily journalism for mass circulation my purpose, as I see it, is first to stimulate enthusiasm over the widest possible range of music and then to discriminate in matters of taste and standards. Encouraging in awareness and enjoyment of music as an art as well as entertainment I regard as essential among a steadily growing but hesitant and often suspicious public, for without it there can be no adequate discrimination.

As an author, Goodwin co-wrote the London Symphony: Portrait of an Orchestra (1954) with Hubert J. Foss, and cowrote with Geraint Evans the latter's memoirs, A Knight at the Opera (1984). (Note: See Goodwin & Foss 1954 and Goodwin & Evans 1984) As sole author Goodwin wrote a history of the Scottish Ballet's first ten years, and wrote the libretto for Peter Darrell's ballet Mary Queen of Scots. Goodwin also wrote many articles for The New Grove Dictionary of Music and Musicians and contributed an article on Theatre music for the Encyclopædia Britannica.

Goodwin was a member of the Gulbenkian Foundation's Dance Advisory Panel from 1972 to 1976, helping found the International Course for Professional Choreographers and Composers. Goodwin died on 27 March 2013.

== Selected writings ==
=== Books ===
- Goodwin, Noël; Foss, Hubert J. (1954). London Symphony: Portrait of an Orchestra. London: Naldrett Press. OCLC 1276037532.
- — (1979). A Ballet for Scotland: The First Ten Years of the Scottish Ballet. Edinburgh: Canongate Books. ISBN 978-0-903937-88-7.
- —; Evans, Geraint (1984). A Knight at the Opera. London: Joseph. ISBN 978-0-7181-2322-2.

=== Articles ===
- Goodwin, Noël (2001). "Ansermet, Ernest". Grove Music Online. Oxford: Oxford University Press. doi:10.1093/gmo/9781561592630.article.00983. ISBN 978-1-56159-263-0. (subscription, Wikilibrary access, or UK public library membership required)
- Goodwin, Noël (2001). "Chailly, Riccardo". Grove Music Online. Oxford: Oxford University Press. doi:10.1093/gmo/9781561592630.article.43938. ISBN 978-1-56159-263-0. (subscription, Wikilibrary access, or UK public library membership required)
- —— (2001). "Haitink, Bernard". Grove Music Online. Oxford: Oxford University Press. doi:10.1093/gmo/9781561592630.article.12190. ISBN 978-1-56159-263-0. (subscription, Wikilibrary access, or UK public library membership required)
- —— (2001). "Pleasants, Henry". Grove Music Online. Oxford: Oxford University Press. doi:10.1093/gmo/9781561592630.article.21932. ISBN 978-1-56159-263-0. (subscription, Wikilibrary access, or UK public library membership required)
- —— (2001). "Szeryng, Henryk". Grove Music Online. Oxford: Oxford University Press. doi:10.1093/gmo/9781561592630.article.27313. ISBN 978-1-56159-263-0. (subscription, Wikilibrary access, or UK public library membership required)
- ——; Halfyard, Janet (2011). "Choreography". In Latham, Alison (ed.). The Oxford Companion to Music. Oxford: Oxford University Press. ISBN 978-0-19-957903-7. (subscription required)
- —— (2014) [2001]. "Klobučar, Berislav". Grove Music Online. Oxford: Oxford University Press. doi:10.1093/gmo/9781561592630.article.43944. ISBN 978-1-56159-263-0. (subscription, Wikilibrary access, or UK public library membership required)
