= Kurt Schindler =

German-born American composer and conductor (1882–1935)

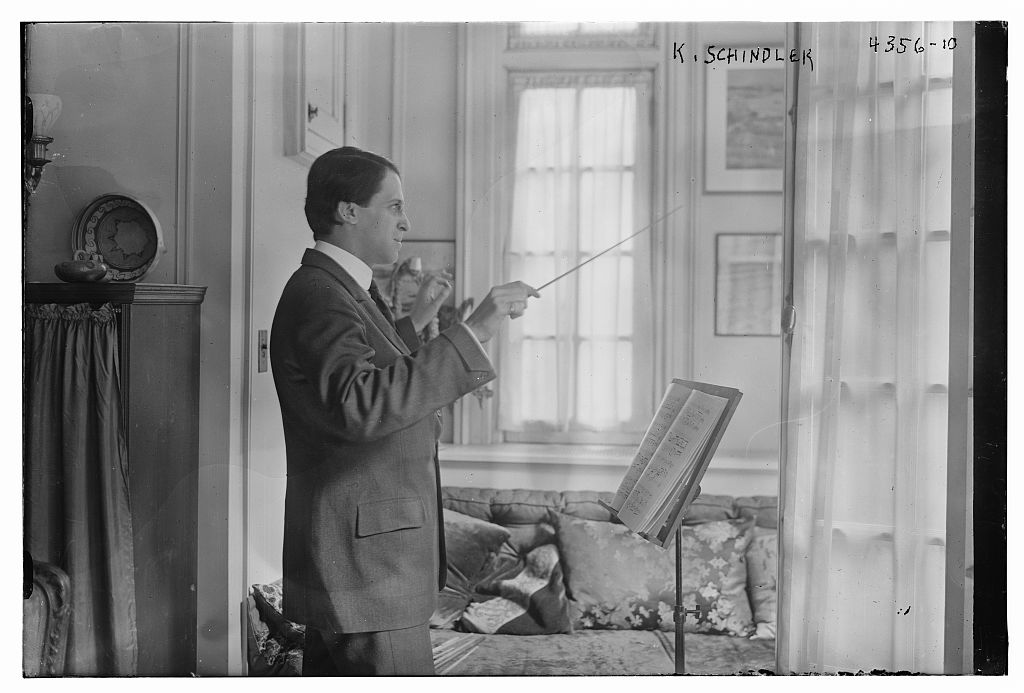
Kurt Schindler in 1917

Kurt Schindler (17 February 1882 – 16 November 1935) was a German-born American composer and conductor.

== Biography ==
He was born on 17 February 1882. He came to the United States in 1905 to serve as an assistant conductor at the Metropolitan Opera, and founded the MacDowell Chorus. He was married to the singer, writer and editor Ursula Greville. He died on 16 November 1935.

== Legacy ==
Much of his choral output consisted of folksong arrangements, though he composed original pieces as well. Folk Music and Poetry of Spain and Portugal/Música Y Poesía Popular De España Y Portugal by Kurt Schindler was published by the New York Hispanic Institute in the US in 1941.

== Sources ==
- Howard, John Tasker (1939). Our American Music: Three Hundred Years of It. New York: Thomas Y. Crowell Company.
- Israel J. Katz: “In the Footsteps of Kurt Schindler: Ballad Collecting in Soria,” in A. Sánchez Romeralo, D. Catalán, and S.G. Armistead, eds., El romancero hoy: Nuevas fronteras (Madrid: Cátedra-Seminario Menéndez Pidal - Univ. of California Press, 1979), pp. 257–66 (with Samuel G.Armistead).
- _____: "Melodic Survivals? Kurt Schindler and the Tune of Alfonso's Cantiga 'Rosa das rosas' in Oral Tradition," in Robert I. Burns, ed., Emperor of Culture: Alfonso X the Learned of Castile and His Thirteenth- Century Renaissance (Philadelphia: Univ. of Pennsylvania Press, 1990), pp. 159–81; 251-57 (notes).
- _____: "Kurt Schindler y la música popular de León y Castilla: Una recolección personal de sus primeras encuestas," Boletín de la Real Academia de Bellas Artes de la Purisima Concepción de Valladolid, no. 28 (1993), 237-46.
- _____: "In the Footsteps of Kurt Schindler: The Portuguese Fieldwork,” in S.G. Armistead, Manuel da Costa Fontes, et al., Cancioneiro Tradicional de Trás-os-Montes (Madison, WI: Hispanic Seminary of Medieval Studies, 1998) (with the collaboration of Prof. Zília Osório de Castro), pp. 11-20.
- _____: "Schindler, Kurt," Diccionario de la Música Española e Hispanoamericana (Madrid, 2002), vol. IX, 860-61.
- _____: and M. Mansano Alonso, eds., Kurt Schindler: Música y poesía popular de España y Portugal. Music and Poetry of Spain and Portugal (New York, 1941). Being a facsimile and critical edition of Kurt Schindler's posthumous publication Music and Poetry of Spain and Portugal (Salamanca/New York, 1991).
- _____: "Schindler, Kurt," The Revised New Grove Dictionary of Music and Musicians (7th ed.). (London: Macmillan, 2001.
- _____: "Schindler, Kurt," Diccionario de la Música Española e Hispanoamericana (Madrid: Sociedad General de Autores y Editores, 2002)
- _____: “The Chronology of Kurt Schindler’s fieldwork in Soria, Spain (from Aug. 4 to Sept. 28, 1930 and Sept. 1932),” in D.J Vicente Blanco, S. Asensio Llamas ,I. Fernández de Mata, and P. Tomé Martín, eds., 'Salvajer’ de acá de allá: Memoria y relato de nosotros. En torno a los trabajos de Luís Díaz Viana (Madrid: CSIC, 2021), pp.
