= Double Crown Club =

The Double Crown Club is a dining club and society of printers, publishers, book designers and illustrators in London that was founded in 1924. Among its early members was the typographer Stanley Morison.

According to Sir Sydney Roberts, writing in his 1966 memoir "Adventures With Authors," the founding of the Double Crown came during a "typographical renaissance which had a notable influence on book-production." While the 1890s saw new standards being applied, Roberts wrote, it was not until after World War I that "publishers as a whole began to recognize that the basic principles of book design could, and should, be exemplified as clearly in a half-crown textbook as in a three-guinea edition de luxe."

The first president, Roberts writes, was Holbrook Jackson. In 1924, Roberts was a member of the club's original committee along with Frank Sidgwick, Hubert J. Foss, Oliver Simon and Gerard Meynell. Douglas Cleverdon was president in c1955. The current Dinner Secretary, responsible for all event arrangements, is Honorary Member James Freemantle.

The club was meant to foster the exchange of ideas on "good printing" and was to meet no fewer than four times a year, and no more than six times.

The name refers to a size of paper, but Roberts writes, it also was chosen because the club planned to "crown" two books a year. That tradition ended in 1927. But one tradition remained—the typography for the menu for each dinner was handled by a member. The first dinner was October 31, 1924, with Simon designing the menu.
