= Cecil Gray (composer) =

Scottish music critic, author and composer (1895–1951)

Cecil William Turpie Gray (19 May 1895 – 9 September 1951) was a Scottish music critic, author and composer.

== Biography ==
Born in Edinburgh, he took an arts degree at the University of Edinburgh and studied composition privately with the Anglo-Canadian composer Healey Willan. From there he developed his career as editor, music critic, and author. Gray first met Philip Heseltine (another writer/critic who also composed music under the name Peter Warlock) at the Café Royal in the spring of 1916 and they were soon sharing a studio – 2 Anhalt Studios, close to Battersea Park. This led to Gray's first musical venture, the co-sponsoring with Heseltine in 1917 of a concert of works by the then completely unknown composer Bernard van Dieren.

Three years later Gray co-founded the early music periodical The Sackbut, also with Heseltine. Gray subsequently worked as music critic for publications including The Daily Telegraph, The Manchester Guardian, and The Morning Post, and occasionally for the Radio Times and The Listener.

His first published book, A Survey of Contemporary Music, was published in 1924, and was notable for its contrary opinions. Frank Howes, The Times chief music critic, pointed out that the formula "so far from the usual view being true, the precise opposite is the case" occurs every few pages. Virginia Woolf mentions the quip he made at Germaine Tailleferre : "Of Mlle. Germaine Tailleferre one can only repeat Dr Johnson's dictum concerning, a woman preacher, transposed into terms of music. 'Sir, a woman's composing is like a dog's walking on his hind legs. It is not done well, but you are surprised to find it done at all.'"

With Heseltine, Gray co-authored the characteristically perverse Carlo Gesualdo, Prince of Venosa: Musician and Murderer in 1926. A full, but equally unorthodox History of Music followed in 1928.

Gray was also an early advocate of Sibelius, championing his music in the UK from 1923 when it was still all but unknown there. He wrote two books on the composer in 1931 and 1935. His sympathetic portrayal of Heseltine/Warlock in his memoir of 1934 is thought by many to be his best literary work. There were also two collections of essays, Predicaments (1936) and Contingencies (1947), a play about Gilles de Rais and an autobiography, Musical Chairs (1948).

== Musical works ==
Gray was also a composer, but preferred to promote the music of his friends Constant Lambert, Peter Warlock and Bernard van Dieren above his own. Hubert Foss said that not even his most intimate friends knew of his complete worth as a composer. (In his autobiography Musical Chairs, Gray said that he was "regarded by musicians as a writer and by writers as a musician").

His first work was the Irish opera Deirdre, completed in 1937. It was never performed in its entirety, but Gray did extract from its third act the Symphonic Prelude for Orchestra (1945), which received several performances in England and the United States. There were two other operas: The Temptation of St Anthony (1937, after Flaubert), and The Trojan Women (1937-40, after Euripides). None of the operas were ever staged, but the BBC did broadcast a shortened version of The Trojan Women on 5 April 1944, conducted by Constant Lambert. Scored for six soloists, chorus and orchestra, the music takes the form of a passacaglia with a chromatic descending ground bass to which the themes of each scene act as a counterpoint. Gray himself adapted and abbreviated the opera for broadcast.

Like Heseltine/Warlock, Gray adopted a pseudonym for some compositions to thwart the enemies he'd made as a critic. Syllogism, or Thesis, Antithesis and Synthesis for orchestra and female chorus was composed using the name Marcus Lestrange. Gray's friend, the artist Michael Ayrton, remembered other works, including an Overture Roma Nobilis and a setting of Canticle of the Sun, but both appear to be lost.

== Personal life ==
In 1917 Gray took out a five-year lease on Count House, close to Bosigran Castle in Cornwall (the house is now a climber's club) where he became a neighbour of D. H. Lawrence. While there, Gray had a relationship with the American Imagist poet H.D. with whom he had a daughter, Perdita, in 1919. In her autobiographical novel Bid Me to Live H.D. portrayed Gray as the character "Vane". Lawrence used Gray as the model for two characters: "Cyril Scott" in Aaron's Rod (1922) and "James Sharpe" in Kangaroo (1923).

He was married three times, first (in 1927) to Natalia Mamontova, the daughter of Natalia Brasova. Their daughter Pauline was born in 1929. But the marriage did not last and Gray married again in 1936, to the Scottish ballet dancer Marie Nielson. Another daughter, Fabia, was born in 1938. His third marriage, to Margery Livingstone Herbage (previously the wife of the BBC's Julian Herbage) in 1944, ended at her death in 1948. Among his grandchildren, through Perdita, was the author and Beatles biographer Nicholas Schaffner.

Gray evidently had difficult relationships with women, something that is partly portrayed by Anthony Powell in his A Dance to the Music of Time sequence of novels – in particular the fifth volume Casanova's Chinese Restaurant. The characters of Maclintick and Gossege are said to form a composite portrait of Gray, though Powell also added echoes of Peter Warlock into the mix.

A hard drinker with a cocaine habit Gray was a slow talker who warmed up and was not regarded as conventional "good company". However he maintained close relationships with many writers, poets, painters and musicians. In 1947 he and his wife Margery moved to the island of Ischia, and then to Capri. He became increasingly ill following Margery's death, returning to the UK in 1951 where he died of cirrhosis of the liver in a Worthing nursing home. In 1989, the composer's daughter Pauline Gray put together a biographical sketch with selections from his notebooks.

== Writings ==
- A Survey of Contemporary Music (London, 1924, 2nd edition 1927)
- (with P. Heseltine), Carlo Gesualdo, Prince of Venosa: Musician and Murderer (London, 1926)
- The History of Music (London, 1928)
- Sibelius (London, 1931, 2nd edition 1934)
- Peter Warlock: a Memoir of Philip Heseltine (London, 1934)
- Sibelius: the Symphonies (London, 1935)
- Predicaments: or Music and the Future (London, 1936)
- The Forty-Eight Preludes and Fugues of Bach (Oxford, 1938)
- Gilles de Rais: a play (1945)
- Contingencies, and Other Essays (London, 1947)
- Musical Chairs, or Between Two Stools: Being the Life and Memoirs of Cecil Gray (London, 1948)
