= Gerald Cockshott =

English composer (1915–1979)

Gerald Wilfred Cockshott (14 November 1915 – 3 February 1979) was an English composer, librettist, writer and teacher.

== Life and career ==
Cockshott was born in Bristol and educated at Taunton School and the University of Bristol where he received his BA in English. He was a friend of and influenced by the composer Ralph Vaughan Williams with whom he studied privately. A Fellow of the Royal College of Organists, he primarily composed choral music, much of it influenced by the English folk tradition, but also composed two operas and several instrumental works.

He had originally written the libretto for the chamber opera Apollo and Persephone for Vaughan Williams, but decided to compose the work himself before showing it to him. Vaughan Williams gave the work his blessing and it was premiered in London in 1954 by the Intimate Opera Company. Apollo and Persephone went on to multiple performances in Europe and North America in the ensuing years. His second opera, A Faun in the Forest, for which he also wrote the libretto premiered in 1959 in Westport, Connecticut.

From 1947 to 1964 Cockshott was the senior English master at Whittingehame College, a boarding school for boys in Brighton founded by the British Zionist Jacob Halevy. After leaving Whittingehame, he taught at Ifield Grammar School and later at Froebel College. He was also the founder of the Peter Warlock Society and served as its first chairman from 1963 to 1969. Cockshott died in West Sussex at the age of 63. His wife Irene died in 2018, and he is survived by two of his three children, his elder daughter having died in 2021.

== Compositions ==
- A Cargo of Fruit (French folk song for baritone solo, SATB, arranged and English words)
- A Carol for Christmas Morning (unaccompanied choral)
- A Carol of Bethlehem (accompanied choral)
- A Charming Country Life (accompanied choral)
- A Child is born in Bethlehem (unaccompanied choral)
- A Christmas Alleluia (traditional French carol, unaccompanied choral, arranged and English words)
- Angels sang that Christmas morn (carol)
- Apollo and Persephone, 1954 (one act comic opera accompanied by piano or piano and string quartet) (composer and librettist)
- A Faun in the Forest, 1959 (one act comic opera) (composer and librettist)
- All in the Morning (unaccompanied choir)
- A Shanty and Two Folk Songs from France (accompanied choral)
- Aubade (unaccompanied choral)
- Autumn twilight (song, text: Arthur Symons)
- Back from the Market (accompanied choral)
- Balulalow (carol, solo and choir)
- Blessed be the time (carol for SATB)
- Can you plant a Brussel Sprout? (accompanied choral)
- Canticle (unaccompanied choral)
- Carol of the Crib (accompanied choral)
- Carol of the Shepherds (accompanied choral)
- Cherries and Plums (accompanied choral)
- Come Away Death (unaccompanied choral)
- Come Bid Farewell to Sorrow (unaccompanied choral)
- Dance suite; six easy pieces for piano
- Dancers of Auvergne (accompanied choral)
- Danish Carol (unaccompanied choral)
- Divertimento No. 1 ( for chamber orchestra)
- Fishing off Iceland (accompanied choral)
- Gloria in excelsis (unaccompanied choral)
- Good People Hear the News I Bring (accompanied choral)
- Gossips at the Wedding (accompanied choral)
- Gone (song, text: Walter de la Mare)
- Greenland Fishery (accompanied choral)
- Haste to the Manger (accompanied choral)
- Haymaker’s Dance (accompanied choral)
- Here lies a most beautiful lady (song, text: Walter de la Mare)
- I have no whiskers on my chin (accompanied choral)
- Il était une bergère (French folksong, arranged and English words)
- In Bethlehem that fair city (accompanied choral)
- In Celebration of Christmas (accompanied choral)
- In Midwinter (unaccompanied choral)
- In Praise of a Lady (unaccompanied choral)
- In Worship of Christ’s Nativity (accompanied choral)
- I saw three ships (accompanied choral)
- I will be glad (unaccompanied choral)
- Jillian of Berry (unaccompanied choral)
- John and the cat (French folksong for unison voices and piano, arranged and English words)
- Johnny and Jenny (accompanied choral)
- King Dagobert (unaccompanied choral)
- King’s Carpenters (unaccompanied choral)
- Ladybird (accompanied choral)
- Le Charbonnier (accompanied choral)
- Maddermarket Suite (for chamber orchestra)
- Magnificat and Nunc Dimittis (accompanied choral)
- May Carol (accompanied choral)
- Merciless Beauty (unaccompanied choral)
- My Blackbird (unaccompanied choral)
- My Boy Billy (unaccompanied choral)
- Now we go to Bethlehem (arranged)
- O John has found a wife (accompanied choral)
- O this night is born (accompanied choral)
- On a Midnight Long Ago (accompanied choral)
- On Christmas Night (unaccompanied choral)
- On the Shore by the River (accompanied choral)
- On to Wakefield (unaccompanied choral)
- Paper of Pins (accompanied choral)
- Paul and the hens (Danish nursery rhyme, accompanied choral, arranged and English words)
- Pirate Song (accompanied choral)
- Planting the oats (French chanson, unaccompanied soprano and alto, arranged and English words)
- Psalmus (unaccompanied choral)
- Quand j’étais chez mon père (French folksong arranged and English words)
- Sans Day Carol (unaccompanied choral)
- Serenade (for flute and string orchestra)
- Sing Lullaby (accompanied choral)
- Sing Noel (accompanied choral)
- Somebody Fetch my Flute (song/accompanied choral)
- Summer (song, text: Robert Seymour Bridges)
- Symphony in B minor (for symphony orchestra)
- The Angel’s Tidings (unaccompanied choir)
- The Apple Harvest (unaccompanied choral)
- The Bagpiper (accompanied choral)
- The Bellman’s Song (accompanied choral)
- The Bird’s Song (accompanied choral)
- The cherry tree (song, text: A. E. Housman)
- The Cobbler (accompanied choral)
- The Crow (accompanied choral)
- The Dancing Shoes (accompanied choral)
- The Farmer’s Daughter (accompanied choral)
- The Faun in the Forest (music theatre, accompanied choral)
- The Friendly Adviser (song)
- The Holly and the Ivy (accompanied choral)
- The Journeyman Cobbler (accompanied choral)
- The King of Spain's Daughter (accompanied choral)
- The Knifegrinder (accompanied choral)
- The Little Man and the Little Maid (accompanied choral)
- The Miller (accompanied choral)
- The Nervous Fox (accompanied choral)
- The Nine Soldiers (accompanied choral)
- The Prince and the Shepherdess (French folksong for unison voices and piano, arranged and English words)
- The Princess by the Water (accompanied choral)
- The Shoemaker’s Son (accompanied choral)
- The Silver Fleet (accompanied choral)
- The Three Kings (carol for SATB a cappella)

== Articles ==
- "A Note on Warlock's Capriol Suite", Monthly Musical Record, 70 (1940), 203–5.
- "E. J. Moeran's Recollections of Peter Warlock", Musical Times, 96 (1955), 128–30.
- "Some Notes on the Songs of Peter Warlock", Music & Letters, 21 (1940), 246–58.
- "Warlock and Moeran", Composer, 33 (1969), 1, 3–4.
