= Capriol Suite =

Musical composition by Peter Warlock

The Capriol Suite is a set of dances composed in October 1926 by Peter Warlock and is considered one of his most popular works. Originally written for piano duet, Warlock later scored it for both string and full orchestras. According to the composer, it was based on tunes in Thoinot Arbeau's Orchésographie, a manual of Renaissance dances. Nevertheless, Warlock's biographer, Cecil Gray, wrote that "if one compares these tunes with what the composer has made of them it will be seen that to all intents and purposes it can be regarded as an original work".

The work is dedicated to the Breton composer Paul Ladmirault.

The suite consists of six movements:

1. Basse-Danse, Allegro moderato, D minor
2. Pavane, Allegretto, ma un poco lento, G minor
3. Tordion, Con moto, G minor
4. Bransles, Presto, G minor
5. Pieds-en-l'air, Andante tranquillo, G major
6. Mattachins (Sword Dance), Allegro con brio, F major

The individual movements are very brief; a performance of the suite lasts about 10 minutes.
