= The Sackbut =

Defunct British music journal

The Sackbut was a British music journal published from 1920 to 1934 by the Curwen Press. It published general articles on mainly contemporary, both British and foreign, music as well as reports on performances and records. It was founded by the composer critics Cecil Gray and Philip Heseltine (a.k.a. Peter Warlock). The singer and composer Ursula Greville was an editor from July 1921 to 1934.

The journal's editions ran from May 1920 (Vol. 1, no. 1) to February 1934 (Vol. 14, no. 7) and was published roughly speaking as a monthly, with exceptions in the first two years and last few years. Noted contributors included Harry Farjeon, William G. Whittaker, Aylmer Maude, Rutland Boughton, Upton Sinclair and Owen Rutter.
