= Bethlehem Down =

1927 song by Peter Warlock

- by Peter Warlock
- Key: D minor
- Period: Early 20th century
- Genre: Christmas carol
- Form: SATB choir
- Occasion: The Daily Telegraph Christmas carol competition
- Text: Bruce Blunt
- Melody: Peter Warlock
- Composed: 1927
- Published: 24 December 1927 in The Daily Telegraph
- Publisher: The Daily Telegraph (1927), Winthrop Rogers (1928)

"Bethlehem Down" is a Christmas carol for SATB choir composed in 1927 by British composer Peter Warlock (1894–1930)—the pseudonym of Philip Arnold Heseltine. (Note: Warlock first used this pseudonym in 1916 when publishing an article in The Music Student journal.) It is set to a poem written by journalist and poet Bruce Blunt (1899–1957). Warlock and Blunt wrote the carol to finance an "immortal carouse" (a heavy bout of drinking) over Christmas in 1927. The pair submitted the carol to The Daily Telegraph's annual Christmas carol contest and won. It is characterised by modal harmony with chromatic inflections. The musicologist Barry Smith described "Bethlehem Down" as the finest of all of Warlock's choral works.

In 1930, Warlock composed an arrangement of "Bethlehem Down" for solo voice and keyboard accompaniment. It was the last piece of music that Warlock wrote, less than three weeks before he died. The solo arrangement uses the soprano line from the SATB version as its melody. It features more complex harmony than the choral arrangement, highlighting the text in a more sombre manner.

== Context ==
=== Composition ===
Peter Warlock was a prolific composer of songs, with over 119 to his name. His choral music is less well-known, but within that genre, "Bethlehem Down" is one of Warlock's most famous carols. The poet and journalist Bruce Blunt told the story behind the creation of "Bethlehem Down" in a letter to Gerald Cockshott, dated 1943. He said that he and Peter Warlock were short on money in the run up to Christmas in 1927, so they had the idea to write a Christmas carol together in the hopes it would be published and earn them enough money for alcohol (or as Blunt called it, an "immortal carouse"). Whilst on a night-time walk between two pubs—The Plough in Bishops Sutton and The Anchor in Ropley—Blunt thought up the words to "Bethlehem Down". He sent the text to Warlock who set it to music within a few days. The completed carol was entered into The Daily Telegraph's Christmas carol competition and won. It was published in the paper on 24 December 1927. (Note: The Telegraph published Warlock's handwritten manuscript, featuring what The New Oxford Book of Carols describes as "archaic diamond-headed notes.") The carol would be published again the following year by Winthrop Rogers (now Boosey & Hawkes). Warlock and Blunt worked on other carols together, including The Frostbound Wood, which was published in the Radio Times on 20 December 1929.

=== Solo arrangement ===
In 1930, Warlock arranged a solo version of "Bethlehem Down". It was written especially for Arnold Dowbiggin to perform as part of a Christmas recital in Lancaster Priory Church. The musicologist Barry Smith writes that in this late period of Warlock's life, he was feeling increasingly depressed. Dowbiggin himself wrote that the solo arrangement of "Bethlehem Down" is "a source for sorrow". The solo arrangement of "Bethlehem Down" was the last piece of music Warlock wrote, less than three weeks before his death. Dowbiggin said that he received the manuscript on the day that Warlock died.

== Composition ==
=== Choral arrangement ===
The choral arrangement of "Bethlehem Down", written and published in 1927, is written for unaccompanied SATB choir. The piece is in D minor and 6/2 time. It is characterised by long phrasing of lines with melancholic modal harmony in a largely homophonic texture. Smith writes that the music complements the lyrics with a "finely-crafted melody" and "imaginative and sensitive harmony". Chromaticism is used throughout the piece, one example being the Tudor-styled flattened sevenths which populate the melody; Ian Alfred Copley writes that this is a common recurring motif in Warlock's music. A prominent example of a flattened seventh occurs in the soprano line of the fifth bar of each verse:

Each verse ends with a phrase which Smith describes as "haunting".

=== Solo arrangement ===
In the solo arrangement of "Bethlehem Down", the solo part uses the same melody as the SATB soprano line. The solo is accompanied by a new keyboard part which can be performed by either piano or organ. Trevor Hold describes the keyboard accompaniment as more "intricate" than the SATB arrangement. It features more complex harmony than the SATB version with additional counterpoint, differences in texture, and a passage linking penultimate and final verses—reminiscent of Warlock's other carol, Corpus Christi. The solo arrangement accompaniment features what Copley calls the "gloom motif"—a motif used in other Warlock pieces consisting of a chromatic sequence played over a pedal. Copley describes the motif as "desolate", and Smith writes that the accompaniment as a whole "highlights the inherent sadness of Blunt's poem".

=== Text ===
Smith writes that, although Warlock was not religious and was anti-Christian, he liked the story of Christmas. Hold writes that Blunt's text takes an "oblique" approach to carol text, contrasting the Christmas story ("Myrrh for its sweetness, and gold for a crown") with the later life of Jesus ("Myrrh for embalming, and wood for a crown").

"When He is King we will give him the Kings' gifts,
Myrrh for its sweetness, and gold for a crown,
Beautiful robes," said the young girl to Joseph,
Fair with her first-born on Bethlehem Down.

Bethlehem Down is full of the starlight—
Winds for the spices, and stars for the gold,
Mary for sleep, and for lullaby music,
Songs of a shepherd by Bethlehem fold.

When He is King they will clothe Him in grave-sheets
Myrrh for embalming, and wood for a crown,
He that lies now in the white arms of Mary
Sleeping so lightly on Bethlehem Down.

Here He has peace and a short while for dreaming,
Close-huddled oxen to keep Him from cold,
Mary for love, and for lullaby music
Songs of a shepherd by Bethlehem fold.

== Reception ==
Smith writes that "Bethlehem Down" is "surely the finest of all [Warlock's] choral works" and a rare example of a modern carol which captures the essence of the genre. The music critic Wilfrid Mellers described it as a small miracle. Music journalist Alexandra Coghlan writes that the piece is Warlock's "unquestioned carol masterpiece", and is particularly impressive given the fact its creation arose from the simple need for money and alcohol. BBC Music Magazine writes that the carol has a beautiful and sombre tone which can act as a change in pace in carol services.

== See also ==
- List of Christmas carols
