= Hubert J. Foss =

English pianist, composer, and book editor

Hubert James Foss
- Born: Hubert James Foss; 2 May 1899; Croydon, England
- Origin: London
- Died: 27 May 1953 (aged 54)
- Occupations: Performer, composer, and editor
- Instrument: Piano

Hubert James Foss (2 May 1899 – 27 May 1953) was an English pianist, composer, and first Musical Editor (1923–1941) for Oxford University Press (OUP) at Amen House in London. His work at the Press was a major factor in promoting music and musicians in England between the world wars, most notably Ralph Vaughan Williams, through publishing and encouraging performance of their works. In doing this work, he made the Music Department of OUP a major publisher of music in the early- and mid-twentieth century.

== Life and career ==
Foss was born at Croydon, to the south of London, the youngest of the thirteen children of Frederick Foss (1850–1968), a solicitor, and Anne Penny Bartrum (1853–1924). His father's father, Edward Foss (1787–1870), had also been a solicitor as well as a historian and biographer of English law and judiciary. Foss's elder sister, Josephine (1877–1983), served as a missionary and teacher of English in Asia and Africa.

Foss's childhood aptitude for both music and language led to his undergraduate education at Bradfield College in these areas as well as in drama. After brief military service towards the end of the First World War, he took a variety of jobs in various teaching and journalistic positions, during which time he married (1921) his first wife, Kate Frances Carter Page (1900–1952), but the marriage only lasted about two years. It was also in 1921 that he was hired by Humphrey S. Milford of OUP's London branch (first at Amen Corner, from 1924 at Amen House) as a sales representative in education. Discussing the antecedents of the Music Department in his history of the Press, Sutcliffe says that Foss "was not particularly interested in education: he was passionately interested in music ... Milford had personal and business relations with cathedral organists and hymnologists. And he also had Hubert Foss."

Foss's experience in education and his musical talents and interest fused with Milford's when Foss brought to Milford a proposal in 1922 for a series or collection of essays on famous composers to be written by well-known contemporary musicians and musicologists. Originally conceived purely as an educational book for the broadcast, recording, and concert-going audience, it may have been the catalyst (Milford's motivation is not clear) for Milford to initiate the creation of a new music publishing department within the London offices. The proposed collection eventually became the first volume of the three-volume Heritage of Music; but upon the new department's undertaking publication of the Oxford Choral Songs series (1923, and still in publication today), Milford made Foss the in-house editor for the series. His work there apparently so impressed Milford that later that year, Foss was appointed the department's head with the title of Musical Editor. Foss also brought his mind to bear on the typographical design of the OUP's music publications at this period.

Foss, working with characteristic energy and enterprise, soon expanded the musical work of the London branch from its original concern with hymnals and music education to every branch of music publication and promotion. He quickly established sales agreements with publishers in other countries, and even in the United States (with Carl Fischer Music) where OUP had its own New York publishing office. He also travelled in Europe and to the United States as a member of the International Society for Contemporary Music (ISCM) whose international festival OUP hosted in 1931. In addition, he was maintaining his own work of composition and piano performance, often accompanying the baritone John Goss, and also his second wife, the soprano Dora Maria Stevens (1893–1978), whom he married in 1927.

As Foss worked at expanding the scope of the Music Department's work (adding "some 200 titles a year"), he also spent much time and energy turning his earliest speculative and underfunded productions into a solid foundation of remunerative publications which would—eventually—both reimburse the Press for the music it had already produced and in turn allow it to introduce new music and composers to the public. In this he had Milford's support, though Milford said that he came nearer than any other single man to ruining the Press. One notable and risky project was the publication by OUP in 1928 of Mussorgsky's original version of Boris Godunov. According to Foss this resulted in "a crop of lawsuits opening up as from a sowing of dragons teeth". It led to the first complete performance outside Russia of the opera, at Sadler's Wells on 30 September, 1935.

The London office's parent body in Oxford was less sympathetic. The difficulty lay in OUP's concept that while the Oxford side (The Clarendon Press) as an academic publisher could and did lose money, the purpose of Amen House was to publish respectable but remunerative books. OUP's accounting traditions further emphasized early write-off as losses of unsold stocks of books, whereas Foss regarded his inventory of music, books on music, performance and "mechanical" (recording and broadcasting) rights, and above all the composers who published with Oxford all as investments. Added to the general economic difficulties of the 1930s, some personal health issues, and the shock caused by the move of the London branch's offices to Oxford to escape The Blitz and the consequent decrease in resources physical and financial, OUP's pressure to reduce his intense efforts to expand the Music Department's scope led to bouts of depression and alcoholism. Foss, "after some difficulties" (which may have included attempted suicide), resigned his editorship in 1941.

In the following years, he energetically pursued a number of freelance musical occupations, serving as critic, reviewer, journalist, and broadcaster. In this last, he was highly regarded and warmly commended by the BBC and other radio authorities during and after the war. He continued to serve as an editor and compiler of articles and works about music and its analysis and appreciation as well as publishing his own works. In the late war years, Foss began his study of Ralph Vaughan Williams, to which the composer himself contributed "A Musical Autobiography". Foss had been asked to assume the editorship of The Musical Times when he suffered a stroke following an operation. He died at the age of 54 at his home in London.

Foss was survived by his second wife, and by children from both his first and second marriages.

== Influences and connections ==
As with others in similar positions (for example, John W. Campbell, Jr., the influential editor of Astounding Science Fiction/Analog), Foss's primary influence in music was as a developer of music and musicians. In this the primary example must be Ralph Vaughan Williams, most of whose music in various forms OUP originally published and still produces. Other composers for whom the Press formed a stepping stone to long and successful careers include William Walton, Edmund Rubbra, and Peter Warlock (the last of whom Foss and his first wife had known early in their lives). Hinnells writes that "Foss had a remarkable ear for the work of a new, younger generation," and Foss's willingness to take risks in publishing such then-unknown artists contributed to bringing them before the English public of his day. However, Foss did misjudge at least one leading British composer: Benjamin Britten. After handling some of Britten's early music, Foss, "in a decision later much regretted by OUP, decided not to continue as his publisher."

Foss brought his whole suite of talents to the selection and production of music. Wright quotes Foss as saying that "the literary side of a song is of equal importance with the musical, and that no one should be expected to sing words of an inferior character." His skills in art and typography manifested themselves in originating distinctive and unique covers, artwork, and layout for each of his "stable" of composers by which copies of their music could be visually identified. This pleased his composers as well as acting as a marketing tool for the sale or rental of their music. (His design for the publication of Constant Lambert's The Rio Grande is still regarded as an outstanding example of music printing.)

With Milford's support, Foss expanded and deepened OUP's music publishing scope from a limited number of hymnals and educational sheet music to a comprehensive inventory of operas, orchestral works, chamber pieces, choral and vocal works, and piano pieces, along with the production facilities and distribution channels to handle them. The educational works were increased and expanded, paralleling increased government support for music education. "The largest part of its publishing came to be of educational and tuitional works. It produced music courses at all levels for schools, textbooks for music colleges and colleges of education, and for universities."

Moreover, Foss played a major role in the industry's recognition of the long-term revenue benefits to be gained by renting scores and parts for large musical works (in contrast to trying to sell them in large quantities when demand was unknown or uncertain) and by acquiring performance and mechanical rights. The latter became increasingly important with the growth of radio and of recorded music. Foss, OUP, and Vaughan Williams were among those who originally opposed the Performing Right Society (PRS) as likely to inhibit musical performance due to their fees. Their position changed, however, as a consequence of decreasing returns from music publication and increasing revenue from broadcasting, and OUP joined the PRS in 1936.

As Musical Editor, Foss expanded OUP's publication of books on music, music analysis, and music appreciation. Continuing OUP's already-established tradition for printing works in series, Foss initiated the booklet series Musical Pilgrims with such authors as C. S. Terry covering the works of Bach and Cecil Gray on the symphonies of Sibelius. Still another series, Oxford Church Music, provided inexpensive but accurate editions of both old and contemporary music for churches and schools; this series still continues today.

In addition to the articles and presentations which would later form the basis for his own studies of Vaughan Williams, Walton, and others, he edited many of the writings of Sir Donald Tovey. Foss found Tovey "fascinating, inspiring, and exhausting," according to Hinnells; but "Foss was credited as being the only man who could have managed to produce [Tovey's] six volumes of Essays in Musical Analysis". It was also Foss who encouraged and supported Percy Scholes during the latter's years as critic and broadcaster; and it was to Foss that Scholes brought what became the first edition of The Oxford Companion to Music in 1938. Late in life, Foss translated Léon Vallas' biography of César Franck. During the same period, he contributed many "liner notes" for long-playing disk recordings.

During the years at Amen House, Foss made the acquaintance of the poet and writer on theology Charles Williams. Williams and Frederick Page were then editors for the Press, and there was a great friendship among all three men. It was for two of Williams' "Amen House Masques" (in 1927 and 1929) that Foss wrote the music and arranged the dances that were performed by some of the employees for festive occasions in honor of Milford and the staff of Amen House. Williams and Foss at about the same time collaborated on a short essay on "Meaning in Poetry and Music" which appeared in Music and Letters.

Most of Foss's own musical compositions are short forms: songs, piano pieces, and chamber music. As might be expected in one who championed the English tradition, his works often involve folk song and Elizabethan influences. Thus, he avoided atonal or "spiky" elements; Foss's music "frequently included complex chromatic harmonies, but his melodic lines remained lyrical in nature." Among the most notable are his contributions (together with Vaughan Williams and Clive Carey) of piano accompaniments for Folk Songs from Newfoundland collected by Maud Karpeles; and his Seven Poems by Thomas Hardy for baritone solo, men's chorus, and instruments.

Showing the "colorful diversity of [his] tastes," Foss contributed articles and letters on the business and the craft of publishing and printing music, and was one of the founders of the Double Crown Club, a dining club for leading printers and typographical designers. He also helped organize the (London) Bach Cantata Club and directed some of its performances.

The composer Herbert Howells, speaking at Foss's memorial service at St. John's Church, St. John's Wood, on 24 June 1953, said that he [Howells]:

often pondered the struggles between heart and mind that must have torn [Hubert] in the exercise and responsibilities of his chief enterprise—the building of the Music Department of the Oxford University Press.… The fruits of that work have been rich and abundant.… The heart and mind of a man governing the accumulation of an extensive catalogue ought, under Providence, to be inhumanly poised and balanced. If the catalogue came to include dusty items among its shining riches, need one wonder? If what we now recognize as deadweight seemed, in its springtime, to deserve the first opportunity for young-eyed creative effort, need we complain? Shall we criticize the generous spirit of the man who took a risk? It is precisely that generosity of his that now so moves us to admiration and affection. And there went with it two other qualities—courage and loyalty….

There are in this gathering of his friends so many who could speak with direct authority on other of his activities and cherished causes. Those who were for five or six years his leading collaborators in the Bach Cantata Club have told me of his selfless work for the important music-making of that society. There are discerning musicians who think of him first as the man whose settings of Thomas Hardy revealed the sensitive creative gift that was in him. A series of Christmas cards signed "Dora and Hubert" are of the kind one keeps and treasures: for to their choice and printing and whole presentation went the grace and exquisite taste that marked his influence in many a distinguished product of the Oxford Press. His heart and mind were attuned to the beauty of sound: his eye to the beauty of a printed page. To the excitement of writing a poem he could add that of printing it with all the experienced skill of a born typographer. On small and great things he lavished an equal care and discernment....

== Selected works ==
=== Books and pamphlets ===
==== Author ====
- Music in My Time (1933)
- The Concertgoer's Handbook (1946, 2nd edition 1951)
- Books About Music: A Reader's Guide (1947)
- Ralph Vaughan Williams: A Study (1950)
- Mussorgsky (Novello Short Biographies, 1951?)
- London Symphony: Portrait of an Orchestra (posthumous, completed by Noel Goodwin, 1954)

==== Editor ====
- Heritage of Music (editor, 3 volumes; 1927, 1934, 1951)
- Tovey: Essays in Musical Analysis: Chamber Music (1944)
- Tovey: Beethoven (1945)
- Wood (Sir Henry): About Conducting: With a Prefatory Note by Hubert Foss (1945)
- Tovey: Essays and Lectures on Music (1949)
- Tovey: The Main Stream of Music and Other Essays [sic] (1949)
- Warlock (Heseltine): Frederick Delius: Reprinted with Additions Annotations and Comments by Hubert Foss (1952)

==== Translator ====
- Léon Vallas: César Franck (1951 tr. of La véritable histoire de César Franck, 1950)

=== Compositions ===
- "As I Walked Forth" and "Infant Joy" (words by William Blake) (19??)
- Seven Poems by Thomas Hardy (1925)
- "The Nurse's Song" (Blake)(1925)
- "New Mistress" (A. E. Housman) (1925)
- "Carol of Amen House" (Charles Williams) (1927)
- Six Songs by Shakespeare (1929)
- "O! I ha'e seen the roses blaw" (arr. of an English North Country ballad) (1929)
- Three Airs for Two Players for violin and piano (1933)
- Folk Songs from Newfoundland (ed. M. Karpeles; piano accompaniments of four tunes) (1934)
- "Come Sleep" (John Fletcher) (1935)
- "Winter Chant" (Richard Watson Dixon) (1937)
- "If I Had But Two Little Wings" (Samuel Taylor Coleridge) (1937)
- A Book of French Songs (selected by E. M. Stéphan; arr. with piano accompaniments by Foss) (1939)
- Prince Otto: A Romance in Two Acts: Based on Robert Louis Stevenson's Famous Novel: Book and Lyrics by Kenelm Foss. Music by Hubert J. Foss (1945?)
- "Lullaby of an Infant Chief" (Sir Walter Scott) (1948)
- "The Gypsy" (Foss) (1949)
- "The Bargain" (Sir Philip Sidney) (1949)
- "Easter Tidings" (B. H. Alexander and an old Easter carol) (1949)

== General sources ==
- Bosky, Bernadette Lynn. Introduction to Williams, Charles: The Masques of Amen House (see below), p. 1–30.
- Bratman, David. "Hubert J. Foss and the Music of the Masques". In Williams, Charles: The Masques of Amen House (see below), pp. 159–164.
- Colles, H. C. "Foss, Hubert (James)". Grove's Dictionary of Music and Musicians, vol. 3. Fifth edition. New York: St. Martin's Press, 1954.
- Colles, H. C., and Frank Howes. "Foss, Hubert J(ames)". The New Grove's Dictionary of Music and Musicians, vol. 6. Second edition. New York: Grove's Dictionaries (ISBN 0-333-60800-3), 2001.
- Eaglefield, A. C. "Foss, Hubert James". A Dictionary of Modern Music and Musicians. London: J. M Dent & Sons, Ltd.; New York: E. P. Dutton & Co., 1924. Rpt. New York: Da Capo Press (ISBN 0-306-70086-7), 1971.
- Foden, Peter, and Paul W. Nash. "The wet grass of bookishness: Hubert J. Foss as book designer" in Matrix 14 (1992), pp. 139–147.
- Foss, Hubert J. "Modern Music Printing", Music and Letters, vol. 4, No. 4 (October, 1923), pp. 340–47.
- Foss, Hubert J. Music in My Time. London: Rich & Cowan Ltd., 1933.
- Foss, Hubert J. "Paper for Printing", The Musical Times, vol. 84, no. 1210 (December, 1943), p. 381.
- Foss, Hubert J. Ralph Vaughan Williams: A Study [RVW]. London: George G. Harrap, Ltd, 1952.
- Frank, Alan. "Hubert Foss" [Obituary]. The Musical Times, vol. 94, no. 1325 (July, 1953), p. 330.
- Hinnells, Duncan. An Extraordinary Performance: Hubert Foss and the Early Years of Music Publishing at the Oxford University Press [AEP]. Oxford: Oxford University Press (ISBN 978-0-19-323200-6), 1998.
- Hinnells, Duncan. "Foss, Hubert James". Oxford Dictionary of National Biography (ODNB), vol. 20. New York: Oxford University Press, 2004.
- Howells, Herbert. "Hubert Foss". Memorial speech rpt. in The Musical Times, vol. 94 no. 1326 (August 1953).
- Lloyd, Stephen, Sparkes, Diana, Sparkes, Brian (editors): Music in Their Time: The Memoirs and Letters of Dora and Hubert Foss, 2019.
- Ould, Hermon. 'Two English Songwriters: Hubert Foss and Norman Peterkin' in The Sackbut, October 1930.
- Oxford University Press. Oxford Music: The First Fifty Years '23-'73. London: OUP, 1973.
- Sutcliffe, Peter. The Oxford University Press: An Informal History. Oxford: The Clarendon Press (ISBN 0199510849 ), 1978.
- Williams, Charles. The Masques of Amen House, together with Amen House Poems, and with Selections from the Music for the Masques by Hubert J. Foss. Edited and annotated by David Bratman, with an Introduction by Bernadette Lynn Bosky. Altadena, California: The Mythopoeic Press (ISBN 9781887726061), 2000.
- Williams, Charles, and Hubert J. Foss. "Meaning in Poetry and Music". Music and Letters, vol. 10, no. 1 (January 1929), p. 83–90. Katherine Wilson's article which led to this essay will be found in the preceding issue of July 1928, p. 211.
- Wright, Simon. "Oxford University Press and Music Publishing: A 75th Anniversary Retrospective". Brio 35, 2 (Autumn–Winter 1998), 90–100.
