= The Oxford Companion to Music =

Music reference book

The Oxford Companion to Music, tenth edition.

The Oxford Companion to Music is a music reference book in the series of Oxford Companions produced by the Oxford University Press. It was originally conceived and written by Percy Scholes and published in 1938. Since then, it has undergone two distinct rewritings: one by Denis Arnold, in 1983, and the latest edition by Alison Latham in 2002. It is "arguably the most successful book on music ever produced" (Wright, p. 99).

== Single-volume edition by Percy Scholes ==
The first edition, a single-volume work, was produced in 1938, edited by Percy Scholes, and was written almost entirely by him alone.

The second edition, published 1939 includes a 64-page categorised List of books about music in the English language by Scholes.

Wherever possible, Scholes tried to use primary source material, rather than summarizing other people's work. His preface to the First Edition describes how he played and read through thousands of sheets music, as well as reading thousands of concert programs and studying "old literature and long-bygone musical journals". From this research, he produced about fifty-five volumes of notes. Each of these was devoted to a separate branch of musical knowledge. He then sought peer review of each of these volumes with specialists in the particular branch of musical knowledge. Finally, these volumes were broken up and re-constituted in alphabetical order.

Scholes' intention was to produce a work relevant to a wide range of readers, from the professional musician to the concert-goer, "gramaphonist", or radio-listener. His work was aimed at a reader for whom it "will neither be beyond the scope of his pocket nor embarrass him by a manner of expression so technical as to add new puzzles to the puzzle which sent him to the book". The result was a work which was highly accessible to the general reader, as well as being useful for the specialist.

While scholarly and well-researched, Scholes' style was also sometimes quirky and opinionated. For instance, his original articles on some of the twentieth-century composers were highly dismissive, as were his articles on genres such as jazz. His entry on the can-can concluded "Its exact nature is unknown to anyone connected with this Companion."

He produced several revisions prior to his death (in 1958), with the last full revision being the 9th edition in 1955. The Tenth Edition, published in 1970, was a revision of Scholes' work by John Owen Ward. Ward considered it "inappropriate to change radically the characteristic rich anecdotal quality of Dr. Scholes' style." Although he brought some of the articles up to date, he left much of Scholes' distinctive work intact.

A distinctive feature of this Companion is a series of "imaginative" portraits of composers created by the artist Oswald Barrett (known as "Batt"). These consist of engravings (Bach, Beethoven, Brahms, Byrd, Chopin, Elgar, Handel, Haydn, Liszt, Mozart, Schubert, Schumann, Tchaikovsky, and Wagner), and a frontispiece which is a colour reproduction of an oil painting of "Beethoven in Middle Life", described by Scholes as "the artist's personal gift to the volume" (see the Preface to the First Edition).

== The New Oxford Companion to Music ==
The New Oxford Companion to Music, 1983

In 1983 a wholly revised two-volume work, titled The New Oxford Companion to Music, was introduced. This was edited by Denis Arnold who made extensive use of other specialist contributors, some 90 in all. The work was significantly broader in coverage than Scholes' original (there was for instance a perceptive article on Bob Dylan), and is the most extensively illustrated of the three versions.

Arnold expressed his intention of adhering to Scholes’ principles and indeed included much of Scholes’ material in the new work. Nevertheless, he cut out much of the personal opinion and quirkiness which was characteristic of the original. For instance, he substantially increased the coverage of female composers and performers, who were almost totally absent from Scholes' work.

There were no further revisions of this version, probably due to its relative unpopularity and Arnold's own early death in 1986.

== 2002 revision ==
The Oxford Companion to Music, 2002 edition

In 2002, a third work was produced. This one, edited by Alison Latham, goes back to the original title and to the single-volume format.

Latham assembled her own team of over 120 contributors, some of whom had contributed to the prior (Arnold) edition, and others drawn from her own previous editing work (for example on the Grove Concise Dictionary of Music). This edition consists of some 7400 articles and aims to bring the work up-to-date: for example, in its coverage of areas such as electronic music and computers.

The 2002 revision is more current, handier and more affordable than its predecessor. However, it abridges the text and eliminates most of the illustrations.

== Bibliography ==
- Arnold, Denis (1983). The New Oxford Companion to Music: Volume 1: A-J; Volume 2: L-Z. Oxford: OUP. ISBN 0-19-311316-3
- Latham, Alison, ed. (2002). The Oxford Companion to Music. London: Oxford University Press. ISBN 0-19-866212-2. OCLC 59376677.
- Scholes, Percy A. (1938). The Oxford Companion to Music: Self-indexed and with a Pronouncing Glossary. Oxford: OUP. ISBN 0-19-311306-6
- Wright, Simon (1998). "Oxford University Press and Music Publishing: A 75th Anniversary Retrospective." Brio 35, 2 (Autumn-Winter), p. 89-100.
