= Ursula Greville =

British soprano and recording engineer

Ursula Greville (1894 – 1991) was a British soprano and folksong singer, songwriter, writer and editor of The Sackbut (a critical music magazine). She has been credited as the first woman recording engineer.

== Career ==
=== Singer ===
Greville was first taught by her mother, who studied with Marchesi. She studied with Field Hyde in London and went to Milan to study with Alfredo Morelli in the early 1920s. She studied diction with Plunkett Greene. Her first recital in London was in 1920. She performed in England, Germany, Austria, and Spain. She did multiple tours in the US. Greville performed a recital at the Town Hall in New York on 16 and 24 October 1926.

=== Sackbut magazine ===
Greville became editor of The Sackbut in July 1921 and she remained editor until 1934. She was in a relationship with John Kenneth Curwen, the publisher of the magazine, and had no prior experience so the decision was seen as controversial. She also composed some songs which were published through her husband's company, Curwen Press.

=== Recording engineer ===
Greville was the recording engineer and part owner of Synchrophone Company, which was formed by Hans Knudsen in 1919 but purchased by Curwen in 1930. Synchrophone was formed to use a vacant record factory in Hertford, England. The factory's previous tenant was Metropole Record (who made Piccadilly and Melba records).

In the 1934, Synchrophone started issuing under the label Octacros. Octacros recordings were single-sided 12" records to be played with short 16mm films. Cinemas would buy the records under a 12-month contract. The records were not sold to the public and are now considered rare.

From 1934 to 1937, Greville was the recording director and the label had three other engineers. Octacros was bought out in 1937 by Decca.

Greville engineered over one dozen records of Frank Newman playing the Christie Theatre organ at the Plaza Cinema (in Rugby, Great Britain) for Octacros. Collector Adrian Tuddenham noted the quality of these records was poor because the company was in financial trouble and had to use subpar materials and recording equipment as a result. The organ had been moved shortly before the recording which left Greville with a less than ideal location for placing a microphone. In addition, the audio had been sent by a 'high quality' telephone line to Hertford where it was captured.

== Personal life ==
Greville was married in 1910 to publisher John Kenneth Curwen. The two had a son, Knowles, born in 1925. She was later married to the composer and conductor Kurt Schindler.

She was a close friend of Israel Regardie. The two traveled together in the summer of 1936.

She moved to the United States at the start of World War II.
