= Bruce Blunt =

George Henry Bruce Blunt, otherwise known as Bruce Blunt (1 July 1899, London – 8 July 1957, London) was an English poet, journalist and wine merchant best known for his collaborations with the composer Peter Warlock. In Frederick Delius and Peter Warlock: a friendship revealed he is described as a "bon viveur, poet, journalist, and writer on wine, gardening, and the turf." His poetry is included in the 1932 anthology Modern Poets edited by J. C. Squire.

For Warlock he wrote a number of short song texts including the carol "Bethlehem Down" (1927) and the songs "The Fox", "The Frostbound Wood" (1929), "The First Mercy" and "The Cricketers of Hambledon" (1928). It has been commented that Warlock's settings of Blunt are amongst his finest. His poem "The Long Barrow" was also set by Bernard van Dieren in 1931.
