= List of compositions by Constant Lambert =

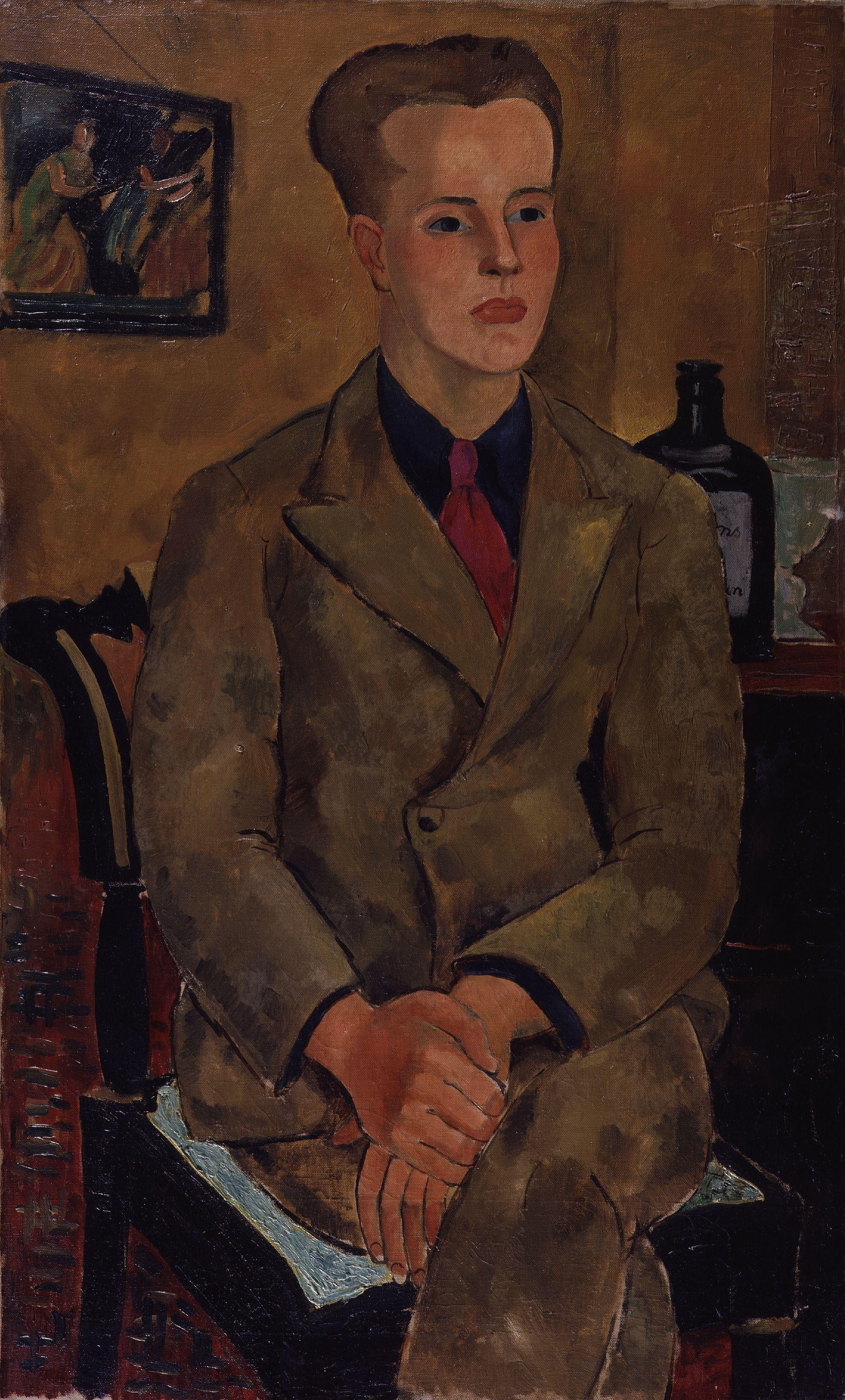
Constant Lambert in a portrait by Christopher Wood (1926)

This is a list of musical works written by Constant Lambert:

== Ballets ==
- Prize-fight (1 act), 1923–4, London, FP 6 March 1924, rev. 1925, 1927, unpublished. (also version for piano, four hands)
- Mr Bear Squash-You-All-Flat (1 act; based on a Russian children's tale), 1923–4, FP Manchester, 22 June 1979, unpublished. (New edition and script by Giles Easterbrook, 2001)
- Adam and Eve (suite dansée), 1924–5, FP London, 6 June 1932, rev. 1932, unpublished
- Romeo and Juliet (2 tableaux), 1924–5, FP Monte Carlo, 4 May 1926 [based on Adam and Eve]
- Pomona (1 act), 1926, FP as a Divertimento 16 November 1926; FP as a ballet Buenos Aires, 9 Sept 1927 [incl. material from Adam and Eve]
- Horoscope (1 act), 1937, FP London, 27 January 1938
- Tiresias (3 scenes), 1950–51, FP London, 9 July 1951, unpublished

== Incidental music ==
- Jew Süss (Ashley Dukes, after Lion Feuchtwanger), ?1929, score possibly lost; FP London, 19 Sept 1929; after Domenico Scarlatti (see also Arrangements: Mars and Venus)
- Salome (Oscar Wilde), clarinet, trumpet, percussion and cello, 1931, FP London, 27 May 1931
- Hamlet (William Shakespeare), flute, two trumpets and percussion, 1944, FP London, 11 Feb 1944, unpublished

== Orchestral ==
- Green Fire, rhapsody, ? 1923, unpublished, score probably lost; FP 28 June 1923
- The Bird Actors, overture, 1925, FP 5 July 1931; reorchestrated 1927, unpublished [originally for pf 4 hands]
- Champêtre, chamber orch, 1926, unpublished in original form [used as Intrada of Pomona; arr. as Pastorale, pf]
- Elegiac Blues, 1927 [arr. pf]
- Music for Orchestra, 1927; FP 14 June 1929; dedicated to Lord Berners
- Aubade héroïque, 1942; FP 21 February 1943; dedicated to Ralph Vaughan Williams on his 70th birthday
- Caprice péruvien, orchestra (on themes by Lord Berners from Le carrosse du St Sacrement)

== Concertante ==
- Concerto for piano, 2 trumpets, timpani and strings, 1924, unpublished. (New edition Giles Easterbrook and Edward Shipley, 1988)
- Concerto for piano and 9 players, 1930–31; FP 18 December 1931; Arthur Benjamin, piano, conducted by the composer; dedicated to Peter Warlock
- see also Arrangements: Concerto for piano and small orchestra (an arrangement of organ concertos by George Frideric Handel)
- see also: Vocal and choral: The Rio Grande

== Film scores ==
- Merchant Seamen, patriotic documentary 1940; orchestral suite arr. 1943, pubd, FP 15 May 1943
- Anna Karenina (dir. Julien Duvivier), 1947, unpublished

== Piano ==
- Alla Marcia, ?1925 [incl. in Romeo and Juliet]
- Overture, pf duet, 1925, unpublished [see Orchestra: The Bird Actors]
- Suite in 3 Movements, 1925, unpublished; FP 19 March 1925
- Tema, ? 1925, unpublished.
- Pastorale, 1926, unpublished.
- Elegiac Blues, 1927
- Sonata, 1928–9; FP 30 October 1929 by Gordon Bryan
- Elegy, 1938
- Trois pièces nègres pour les touches blanches, 4 hands, 1949; FP 17 May 1949; dedicated to Edward Clark

== Vocal and choral ==
- 2 Songs (Sacheverell Sitwell), soprano, flute and harp, 1923; FP 6 March 1924
- 8 Poems of Li-Po, voice, piano or 8 insts, 1926–9; FP 30 October 1929; dedicated to Anna May Wong
- The Rio Grande (Sacheverell Sitwell), alto, chorus, piano, brass, strings, percussion, 1927; first broadcast by the BBC 27 February 1928; first concert performance 12 December 1929, Hamilton Harty, piano
- Summer's Last Will and Testament (Thomas Nashe: Pleasant Comedy), baritone, chorus and orchestra, 1932–5; FP 29 January 1936
- Dirge from Cymbeline (William Shakespeare), tenor and baritone soli, male chorus, strings, 1940; FP 23 March 1947, BBC broadcast; dedicated to Patrick Hadley

== Arrangements ==
- Mars and Venus (incidental music for Jew Süss) (after Domenico Scarlatti)
- Hommage aux belles viennoises, 1929 (after Franz Schubert)
- Les rendezvous, 1933 (after Daniel Auber: L'enfant prodigue)
- Bar aux Folies-Bergère, 1934 ballet (arrangement of piano music by Chabrier)
- Apparitions, 1936, unpublished. (after Franz Liszt)
- Les patineurs, 1937, ballet using music of Giacomo Meyerbeer (Le prophète, L'étoile du nord)
- Harlequin in the Street, 1938, unpublished (after François Couperin)
- Dante Sonata, piano and orchestra, 1940, unpublished (after Liszt)
- The Prospect Before Us, London, 1940, unpublished (after William Boyce)
- Comus, 1942 (after Henry Purcell)
- Hamlet, London, 1942 (after Pyotr Ilyich Tchaikovsky)
- Ballabile, 1950 (after Emmanuel Chabrier)
- Caprice péruvien, orchestra (after Lord Berners: Le carrosse du St Sacrement)
- Concerto for piano and small orchestra (after George Frideric Handel: organ concertos Nos. 2 and 6)
- Facade, Suites 1 and 2 arranged for piano duet (William Walton)
- Job: A Masque for Dancing (Ralph Vaughan Williams), version for theatre orchestra; FP 1931, ISCM Festival, Oxford
- Keyboard pieces by Thomas Roseingrave

== Editions ==
- William Boyce: 8 symphonies, string orchestra, wind ad lib
- Boyce: The Power of Music, The Cambridge Ode, Pan and Syrinx, string orchestra, wind ad lib
- Henry Purcell: The Fairy-Queen, collab. Edward J. Dent, unpublished

== Sources ==
- Michael Jamieson Bristow
- mininova
- Grove's Dictionary of Music and Musicians, 5th ed., 1954, Eric Blom, ed.
