= Eiluned Davies =

Anglo Welsh concert pianist and composer

Eiluned Davies (1913 – 1999) was a British concert pianist and composer.

== Early life ==
Born in Walthamstow, London, the daughter of Welsh bard Owen Davies of Llanarth, Davies won a scholarship to the Royal College of Music at the age of 15 (1929-1933) where her teachers included Gordon Jacob, C H Kitson and Kathleen Long. She also took private piano lessons with Frida Kindler (1879–1964), a pupil of Busoni and the wife of composer Bernard van Dieren.

== Career ==
Davies' first London piano recital took place in June 1936 at the Aeolian Hall, and her first radio broadcast followed in April 1937.

During the war Davies performed at the National Gallery concerts organized by Myra Hess, at which she gave the first performance in England of Shostakovich's Piano Sonata, Op. 12 (on 31 May 1943). She also taught at the City Literary Institute (from 1945), the Mary Ward Centre (from 1956) and the Stanhope Institute, before retiring from teaching in 1979.

Davies' compositions include choral, song and piano works, such as the Sociable Pieces for piano six hands, Three European Folk Dances for piano, a Requiem (1972, performed in Winchester, revised 1991) and the song cycle Glimpses (1993) for female vocal quartet. All her pre-war compositions were withdrawn and destroyed.

Davies' repertoire included Beethoven, Chopin, Liszt, Busoni and Bernard Stevens. Davies recorded the complete solo piano works of Bernard van Dieren for the British Music Society in the 1980s. She also championed Welsh composers, naming 'Y Pump Cymreig' (The Welsh Five) as Denis ApIvor, Daniel Jones, Mervyn Roberts, Grace Williams and David Wynne. She premiered ApIvor's Piano Concerto, op. 13 in 1948 and Wynne's Piano Sonata No 2 in 1957.

In the 1950s Davies' London address was Flat 2, 23 Coram Street, WC1. She later moved to 40, The Limes Avenue, New Southgate. Her archive is held at the National Library of Wales.
