= The Rio Grande (Lambert) =

Secular cantata by Constant Lambert

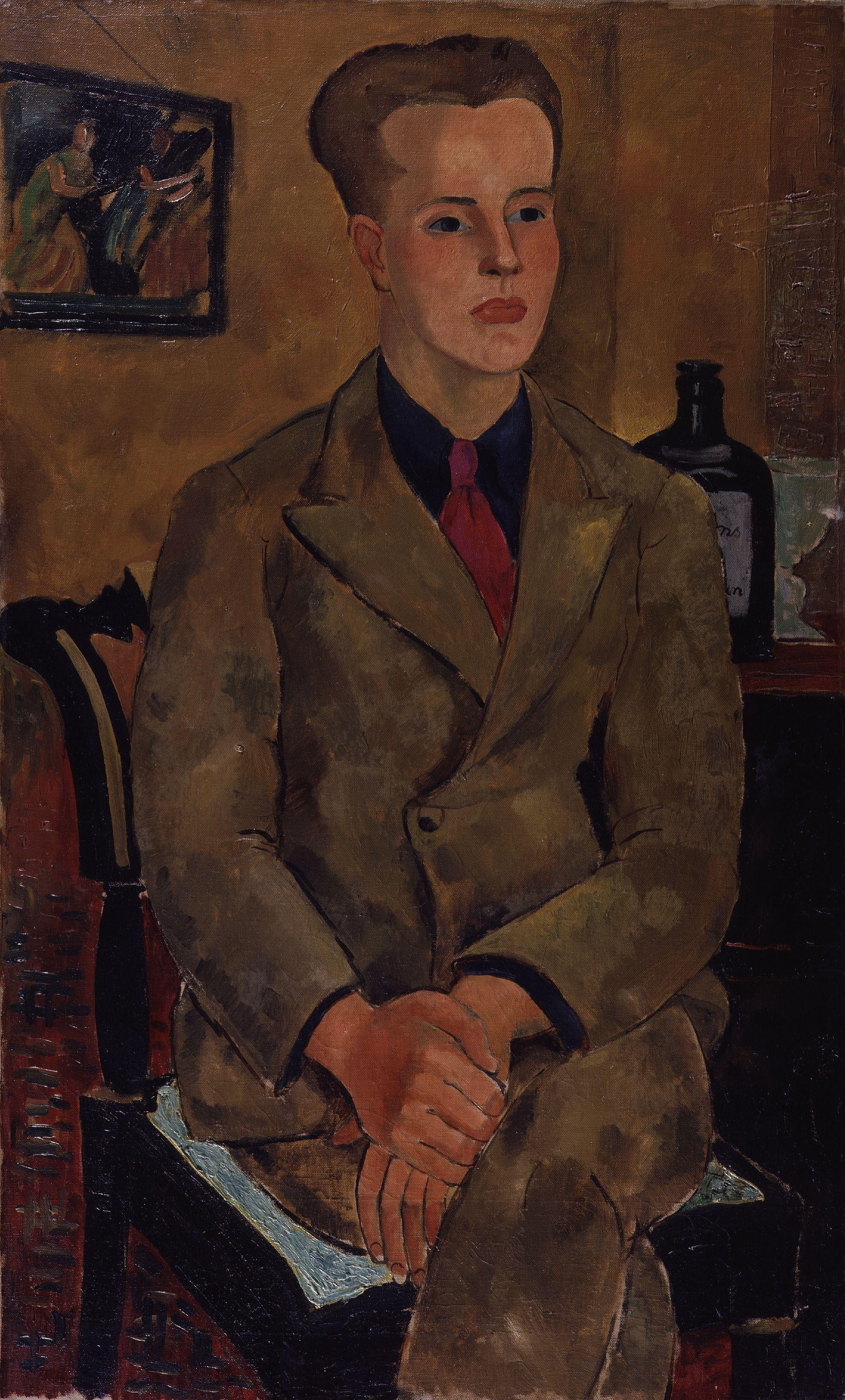
Constant Lambert, 1926 portrait by Christopher Wood

The Rio Grande is a secular cantata by English composer Constant Lambert. Written in 1927, it is a setting of the poem by Sacheverell Sitwell. The piece achieved instant and long-lasting popularity on its appearance on the concert stage in 1929. It is an example of symphonic jazz, not unlike the style of George Gershwin's Rhapsody in Blue, although it is very much Lambert's individual conception. It combines jazzy syncopation with lithe Latin American dance rhythms that create an air of haunting nostalgia. The Rio Grande takes roughly 15 to 20 minutes to perform. It was dedicated to Angus Morrison, who played at its first (broadcast) performance.

No other work of Lambert's achieved the level of popularity achieved by The Rio Grande. It is still performed regularly today, at the BBC Proms (including the Last Night) and by choral societies in the UK and abroad.

== Creation ==
The idea for this piece began when in 1923 Lambert attended a performance by Will Vodery’s Plantation Orchestra. He later wrote: ‘After the humdrum playing of the English orchestra in the first half, it was electrifying to hear Will Vodery’s band in the Delius-like fanfare which preluded the second. It definitely opened up a new world of sound.’ That "new world of sound" is the syncopated jazz sound that he would incorporate in The Rio Grande. While George Gershwin was clearly a major influence, Vodery's mention shows us that besides Gershwin, the entire jazz and Broadway zeitgeist of the day served as the influence for this piece. Frederick Delius also served as an inspiration. The chorus’s fortissimo opening statement is a direct transcription of the fanfare that appears frequently in Delius' work (the famous "Walk to the Paradise Garden" from A Village Romeo and Juliet, to quote just one instance, has it in almost every bar). Delius knew much about spirituals from living among African-Americans in Florida.

== Style ==
The Rio Grande is scored for alto soloist, mixed chorus, piano, brass, strings and a percussion section of 15 instruments, requiring five players. It combines jazzy syncopations, ragtime and Brazilian influences, harmonies and rhythms inspired by Duke Ellington, with a traditional English choral sound. The outer sections are brisk, surrounding a central nocturne, which is introduced by a virtuosic solo piano cadenza with percussion. The piano part often plays triplets against duplets, redolent of a rumba. The coda is based on material from the central section.

Lambert noted in a 1928 article:

The chief interest of jazz rhythms lies in their application to the setting of words, and although jazz settings have by no means the flexibility or subtlety of the early seventeenth-century airs, for example, there is no denying their lightness and ingenuity … English words demand for their successful musical treatment an infinitely more varied and syncopated rhythm than is to be found in the nineteenth-century romantics, and the best jazz songs of today are, in fact, nearer in their methods to the late fifteenth-century composers than any music since.

Music critic Christopher Palmer said of this piece that:

Lambert would be the first to concede, today, that some of the harmonic and rhythmic clichés he decried in others had slipped into his own work. Yet, for all that, The Rio Grande retains a pristine quality. Now hard, now soft, it sparkles and glitters one moment, then seduces us the next with the kind of bluesy urban melancholy to be found in deeper, richer measure in a quite different context in Summer's Last Will and Testament. It is above all the work of a poet, and Lambert’s poetic sensibility has ensured the survival of his best music. The free-fantasy form is simplicity itself: first section (allegro) – cadenza for piano and percussion – slow central section, in the style of a nostalgic tango – recapitulation – tranquil coda.

Angus Morrison, discussing the long cadenza accompanied by percussion, noted that:

It was always Constant's idea that the piano should be, like the 'I' of a novel, a central narrator interpreting and reflecting upon the varied episodes that appear in the course of the poem...the cadenza [is] not only a brilliant showpiece of dazzling virtuosity and bravura (which always seems to issue from the preceding trombone glissandi with the force of a rocket) but also a sort of journey in which the player, as narrator, seems to take the listener by the hand and guide him through the streets and squares of this imagined city.

== The poem ==
The text is a poem by Sacheverell Sitwell, first published in his collection The Thirteenth Caesar, and other Poems (1924). It contrasts the lively urban dancing in the city with the slow courtly dancing of the sarabande on the grassy banks of the river, and the singing of "forlorn madrigals". Andrew Motion has suggested that Lambert's music brings out the underlying sadness behind the poem's extravagant words, "suggesting such freedoms are exceptions to the general rule. Created between two world wars, in the aftermath of the general strike, it admits to an element of guilt in its escapism, and of guilt in its melancholy".

The poem refers to a river in Brazil which flows through a town and over a waterfall, although it is not clear if it is meant to refer to a real location or if it is entirely imaginary. There is a river called Rio Grande in the states of Minas Gerais and São Paulo. There are also states named Rio Grande do Norte and Rio Grande do Sul, as well as a city in the latter state called Rio Grande.

By the Rio Grande
They dance no sarabande
On level banks like lawns above the glassy, lolling tide;
Nor sing they forlorn madrigals
Whose sad note stirs the sleeping gales
Till they wake among the trees and shake the boughs,
And fright the nightingales;
But they dance in the city, down the public squares,
On the marble pavers with each colour laid in shares,
At the open church doors loud with light within.
At the bell's huge tolling,
By the river music, gurgling, thin
Through the soft Brazilian air.
The Comendador and Alguacil are there
On horseback, hid with feathers, loud and shrill
Blowing orders on their trumpets like a bird's sharp bill
Through boughs, like a bitter wind, calling
They shine like steady starlight while those other sparks are failing
In burnished armour, with their plumes of fire,
Tireless while all others tire.
The noisy streets are empty and hushed is the town
To where, in the square, they dance and the band is playing;
Such a space of silence through the town to the river
That the water murmurs loud -
Above the band and crowd together;
And the strains of the sarabande,
More lively than a madrigal,
Go hand in hand
Like the river and its waterfall
As the great Rio Grande rolls down to the sea.
Loud is the marimba's note
Above these half -salt waves,
And louder still the tympanum,
The plectrum, and the kettle-drum,
Sullen and menacing
Do these brazen voices ring.
They ride outside,
Above the salt-sea's tide.
Till the ships at anchor there
Hear this enchantment,
Of the soft Brazilian air,
By those Southern winds wafted,
Slow and gentle,
Their fierceness tempered
By the air that flows between.

== Premieres ==
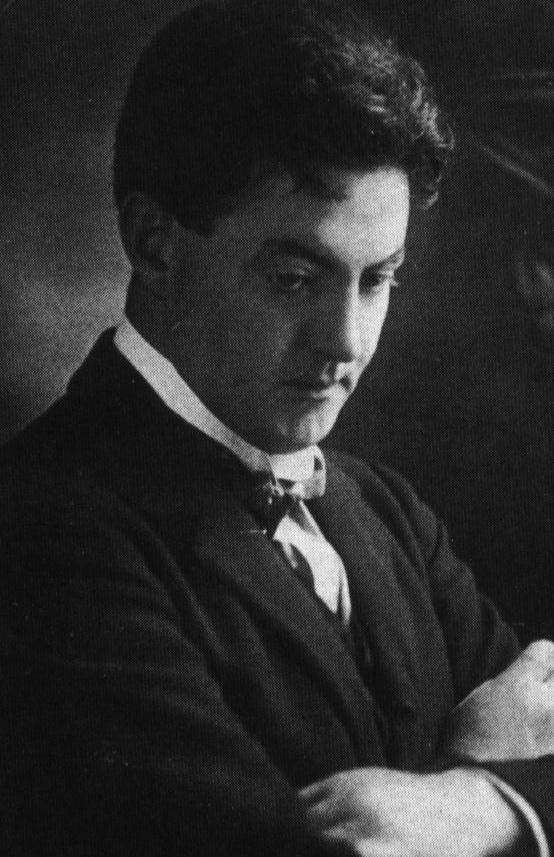
Hamilton Harty

Its first performance was a BBC Radio broadcast on 27 February 1928 from the old BBC Studios at Savoy Hill. The piano soloist was Angus Morrison, to whom the work was dedicated. It was popular enough to be repeated six months later.

The first concert performance was in Manchester on 12 December 1929 with Sir Hamilton Harty as piano soloist, and the composer conducting the Hallé Orchestra. It had its London premiere the following day, 13 December, at the Queen's Hall, London, with the same forces. It was repeated at the subsequent Hallé concert the following month. There was also the first chamber performance, on 15 June 1930 at a party given by the composer Arthur Benjamin at his house in London (66 Carlton Hill, St John's Wood), for two pianos (Benjamin & Julie Lasdun), Albert Whitehead (alto solo), a choir of six, Lambert on percussion taking the part of five players, and William Walton turning the pages.

The piece was also an international success. The first performance in Canada (and in North America), was on 11 February 1930, with Ernest Seitz and the Toronto Symphony Orchestra. It was first heard in New York on 29 January 1931 given by Hugh Ross and the Schola Cantorum with Colin McPhee as the piano soloist. The following April Serge Koussevitzky included it in the 50th anniversary season of the Boston Symphony Orchestra.

On 28 August 1945, aged just 23, the pianist Kyla Greenbaum first appeared as a soloist at the BBC Proms in a performance of The Rio Grande. It became her calling card, with Lambert saying that he preferred her interpretation to that of Hamilton Harty. She played it again at the Proms on 15 August 1951 with the composer conducting, just days before his death.

== Recordings ==
The composer made two recordings of The Rio Grande as conductor, both of which have held their place in the catalogue:

- 11 January 1930: Albert Walter Whitehead (male alto; also seen as A. W. Whitehead, and Alan Whitehead), Sir Hamilton Harty (piano), St Michaels Singers, the Hallé Orchestra.
- 14 January 1949: Gladys Ripley (alto), Kyla Greenbaum (piano), Philharmonia Chorus and Orchestra.

Later recordings include:

- Jean Allister (contralto) and Eileen Joyce (piano) with the B.B.C. chorus and the B.B.C. orchestra conducted by Sir Malcolm Sargent, B.B.C. Prom, broadcast 'live' from the Royal Albert Hall, London on Saturday, 12 September 1959
- Jean Temperley (mezzo-soprano), Cristina Ortiz (piano), the London Madrigal Singers, the London Symphony Orchestra, André Previn (conductor), Angel Records, 1974.
- Sally Burgess (alto), Jack Gibbons (piano), Chorus of Opera North, English Northern Philharmonia, David Lloyd-Jones (conductor) (this recording was nominated for a Gramophone Award and awarded a Penguin Guide 3-star rosette)
- Della Jones (mezzo), Kathryn Stott (piano), BBC Singers, BBC Concert Orchestra, Barry Wordsworth (conductor).
