= Bernard van Dieren =

Dutch composer and author (1887–1936)

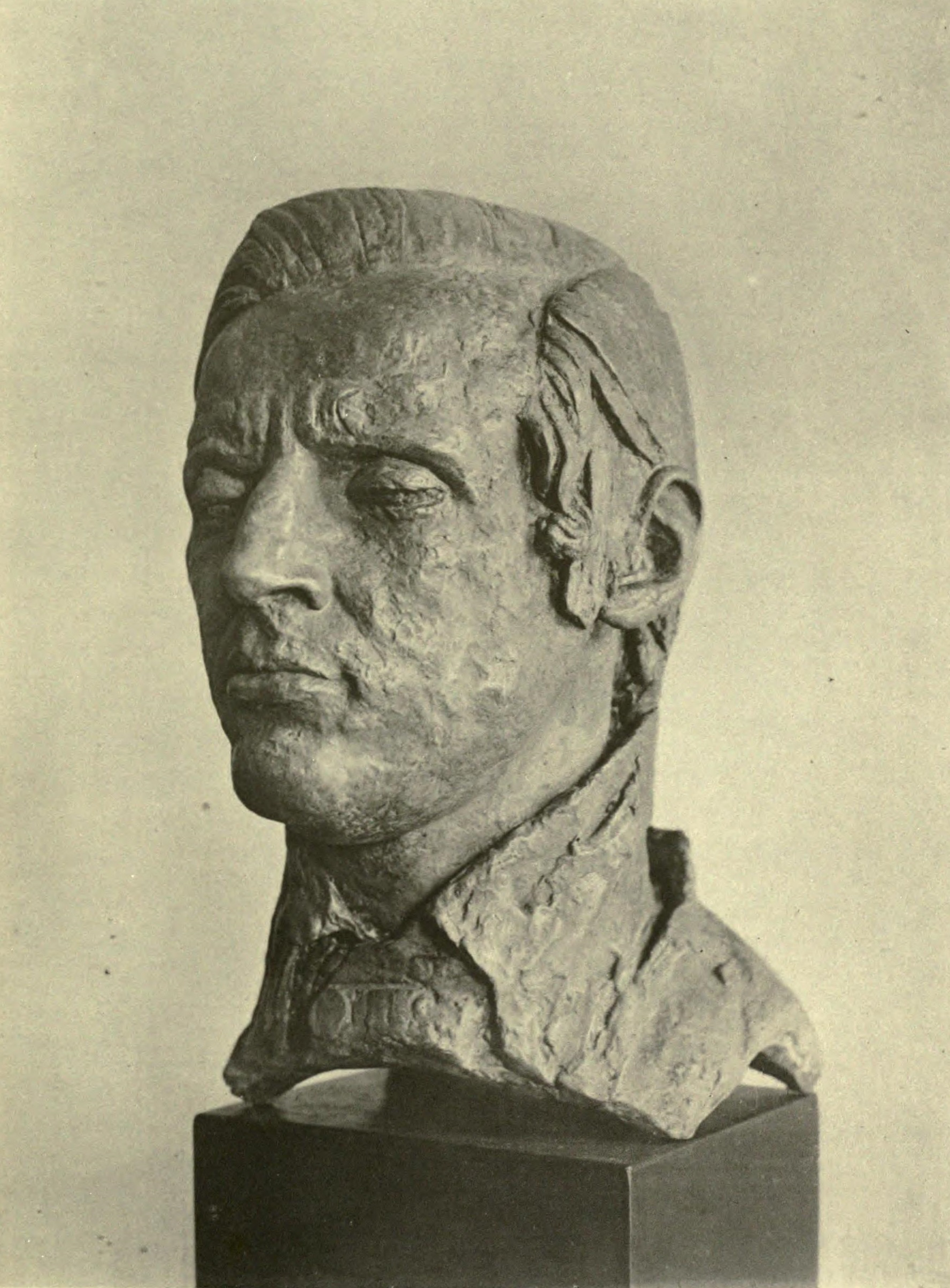
- Bust of Bernard van Dieren, by Jacob Epstein

Background information
- Born: Bernard Hélène Joseph van Dieren; 27 December 1887; Rotterdam, Netherlands
- Died: 24 April 1936 (aged 48) London, England
- Occupations: Composer, writer

Bernard Hélène Joseph van Dieren (27 December 1887 – 24 April 1936) was a Dutch composer, critic, author, and writer on music, much of whose working life was spent in England.

== Biography ==
Van Dieren was the last of five children of a Dutch Rotterdam wine merchant, Bernard Joseph van Dieren, and his French second wife, Julie Françoise Adelle Labbé. Details of his education are unknown but it seems that his early training was as a scientist, as a research assistant in a laboratory. Gifted in science, extremely intelligent and with a phenomenal memory, he was also well-versed in literature as well as an able violinist and amateur artist.

His career as composer began when he was twenty when some of his early works were published in the Netherlands. In 1909 he relocated to London as a correspondent for the Nieuwe Rotterdamsche Courant with his wife-to-be, Frida Kindler (1879–1964), a very gifted concert pianist whom he married on 1 January 1910. By this time he had decided to study music seriously. A son, Hans Jean Jules Maximilian Navarre Benvenuto Bernard van Dieren (1910–74), was born the same year, during which he took British nationality. They settled at 35A St George's Road, West Hampstead in the 1920s, and later at 68, Clifton Hill, St John's Wood.

He was largely self-taught, though he spent 1912 in Europe where he met the composers Busoni and Schoenberg. His early contact with the music world was as a musical correspondent for several European newspapers and periodicals. During the First World War he was for a short time involved in secret service in the Netherlands, as a cypher expert in the Intelligence Department.

He suffered most of his life from ill health and had numerous operations for kidney-related complaints. To relieve the recurring pain, morphine was prescribed, and it is thought that in later life he became addicted to the drug. Because of these frequent bouts of illness, his wife, a former pupil of Busoni, supported the family by teaching the piano and by giving recitals. They also relied on financial support from a group of admirers and friends, which included notable personalities such as Jacob Epstein, Osbert and Sacheverell Sitwell, Augustus John, Kaikhosru Shapurji Sorabji, Philip Heseltine (the composer Peter Warlock) and Cecil Gray. The latter two were especially drawn by his charismatic and powerful personality and gave untiring support for his cause by prompting performances and publication of his works.

However, this sometimes over enthusiastic support generated a backlash from non-believers. Eric Coates, who played viola in the under-rehearsed premiere of Diaphony (1916), witnessed the contempt of the musical establishment – Parry, Stanford and others – towards van Dieren. Heseltine made van Dieren his heir in his will, inspiring claims by Heseltine's son Nigel that van Dieren had murdered Heseltine.

In 1925 van Dieren worked for the Philips electrical company but recurring illness forced him to resign the following year. Some of his works were published in 1927 and in the same year his Fourth String Quartet was performed at the Frankfurt Festival. In 1930 he completed his comic opera The Tailor (begun in 1916 at Heseltine and Gray's request). He also wrote a book on Epstein (1920) and published a collection of controversial essays entitled Down Among the Dead Men (1935). In his writings van Dieren championed composers such as Alkan, Bellini, Busoni, Liszt and Meyerbeer.

Eventually two of his more important works were broadcast by the BBC: Diaphony in 1934 and the Chinese Symphony in 1935. He died on 24 April 1936 in London, and is buried on the edge of the graveyard of St Lawrence's Church, West Wycombe. Constant Lambert, who conducted the first public performance of the Chinese Symphony from BBC Broadcasting House on 15 March 1935, claimed that the theme for the opening movement, "Palindromic Prelude", from his 1938 ballet Horoscope, was dictated from beyond the grave by van Dieren.

== Musical style ==
The music of van Dieren is harmonically chromatic, rhythmically fluid and freely polyphonic, tonally anarchic rather than atonal and often notated without barlines. At the same time melody, particularly the importance of the singing line, is central. Wilfrid Mellers rated him "a great melodist". This is most evident in the songs, championed by the baritone John Goss and the soprano Megan Foster in the 1920s and 1930s. He set some German texts (particularly Heine), but mostly chose from the English Romantic poets, including Shelley, Byron, Keats, Beddoes and Walter Savage Landor. According to Stephen Banfield, van Dieren, “if he belongs anywhere”, is best positioned as part of the inter-war lyrical tradition.

In his chamber music the influence of Schoenberg can be detected, along with “a textual complexity (comparable with Busoni) which engages the imagination”. The six quartets gained immediate attention from leading performers of the day: for instance the Second String Quartet was premiered by the Amar Quartet, with Paul Hindemith on viola, at the Donaueschingen Festival in 1922. The Third, dedicated to Delius, shows some of the serenity of its dedicatee. It was a favourite of the Brosa Quartet. The Fourth Quartet is written for the unorthodox combination of two violins, viola and double bass. The fifth quartet, composed in 1925, was originally written for violin, viola, cello and double bass, but in 1931 van Dieren re-scored it for conventional quartet. The composer Ronald Stevenson later transcribed it for solo piano "as a piano sonata (which B. v. D. never composed)".

The piano music illustrates van Dieren's shifts in style, from the atonal and terse Six Sketches (1910-11) to the more approachable, lyrical and tonally oriented style of the Three Studies (early 1920s) and Tema Con Variazione (1927). Many of these pieces were premiered by the composer's wife Frida, but they have also been performed over the years by Kathleen Long, Robert Collet (1905-1993) Erik Chisholm, Ronald Stevenson, Eiluned Davies and (most recently) Christopher Guild.

The Chinese Symphony (1912–14) shows the characteristic style of the songs and chamber work could be applied to large forces: it is scored for five soloists, chorus and orchestra. The text uses German translations by Hans Bethge of Chinese poetry, also used by Mahler in Das Lied von der Erde a few years earlier. Along with Schoenberg and Busoni, the rhapsodic and lyrical style of Delius can often be heard in the Chinese Symphony and other orchestral works, such as the Elegy for cello and orchestra.

Although Oxford University Press (under Hubert Foss) published some scores from 1925 onward, much of van Dieren's work remained in manuscript and hard to find for many years after his death, until work of reconstructing missing scores and instrumental parts was carried out by Denis ApIvor and Alastair Chisholm in the 1970s. More recently, Barry Ould of Bardic Edition has been making previously unpublished scores available again.

== Major works ==
Orchestral
- Elegy for cello and orchestra (1908)
- Symphonic Epilogue to 'The Cenci', Op. 3 (1910)
- Belsazar for baritone and orchestra (1911)
- Symphony No. 1 Chinese, Op. 6 (1914)
- Diaphony for baritone and chamber orchestra (1916)
- Overture to an Imaginary Comedy for 16 instruments (1916)
- Introit to Topers’ Tropes ‘Les Propos des Beuveurs’ after Rabelais (1921)
- Serenade for chamber orchestra (1925)
- Anjou (Comedy Overture) for orchestra (1935)
- Symphony No. 2 (In Three Dance Movements) (unfinished)

Chamber and Solo

- Impromptu for violin (1909)
- String Quartet No. 1, Op. 5 (1912)
- Ballad de Villon, string quartet and recitation (1917)
- String Quartet No. 2, Op. 9 (1917)
- String Quartet No. 3, Op. 15 (1919)
- String Quartet No. 4, Op. 16 (1923)
- String Quartet No 5 (1925, re-scored 1931)
- String Quartet No. 6 (1927)
- Sonatina Tyroica for violin and piano (1927)
- Sonata for solo violin (1928)
- Sonata for solo cello (1930)
- Estemporales, harp solo (1931)

Piano

- Six Sketches Op. 4a (1911)
- Toccata (1912)
- Netherlands Melodies (1917)
- Three Studies (1925)
- Tema con Variazione (1928)
- Adagio Cantando, transcription from String Quartet No. 5 (1931)
- Piccolo Pralinudettino Fridato (1934)

Song

- Mir träumte von einem Königskind (Heine)
- Wer zum ersten Male liebt (Heine, 1908)
- Wenn ich auf dem Lager liege (Heine, 1908)
- Und wüssten's die Blumen (Heine, 1908)
- Lebewohl (Mörike, 1908)
- Song from 'The Cenci' (Shelley, 1909) (string quartet)
- Es fällt ein Stern herunter (Heine, 1911)
- Die Trennung (Hans Bethge, 1912)
- Epiphanias (Goethe, 1914)
- Mädchenlied: An einem jungen Rosenblatt (Bierbaum, 1914)
- Green (Verlaine, 1915)
- Ich wandelte unter den Bäumen (Heine, 1918)
- Mon bras pressait ta taille frêle (Hugo, 1921)
- À Cassandre (Ronsard, 1924)
- Sonetto VII for tenor and 11 instruments (Spenser, 1925)
- Dream Pedlary (Thomas Lovell Beddoes, 1925)
- Oh! Quand je dors (Hugo, 1925)
- Rhapsodia (De Quincey, 1925) (string quartet)
- Schön Rohtraut (Mörike, 1925)
- Spring Song of the Birds (King James I of Scotland, 1925)
- Take, o take those lips away (Shakespeare, 1925)
- Weep you no more sad fountains (anon., 1925)
- With Margerain Gentle (Skelton, 1925)
- Der Asra (Heine, 1927)
- Last Days (Landor, 1927)
- Love Must Be Gone (Landor, 1927)
- She I Love (Landor, 1927)
- Les roses étaient toutes rouges (Verlaine, 1927)
- Mon cœur se recommande à vous (Lassus, arr. van Dieren, 1927)
- Spleen (Verlaine, 1927)
- Spring, the sweet Spring (Thomas Nashe, 1927)
- Ach, ich sehne mich nach Thränen (Heine, 1930)
- Der Kastraten Urteil und Gesang (Heine, 1930)
- Seraphine (Heine, 1930)
- A Prayer (Joyce, 1930)
- Frail the White Rose (Joyce, 1930)
- Nightpiece (Joyce, 1930)
- Mit deinen blauen Augen (Heine, 1930)
- Dawn (John Ford, 26 April 1935)

Opera

- The Tailor (1917–30)

== Discography ==
- Twentieth Century English Songs: Dream Pedlary and Take, o take those lips away. Peter Pears, Viola Tunnard, Argo RG 439 (1965)
- Piano Music Volumes 1 and 2: Six Sketches, Toccata, Tema con Variazione, Three Studies, Piccolo Pralinudettino Fridato, Adagio Cantando, Netherlands Melodies, Eiluned Davies (piano), British Music Society BMS 402 (1983) and BMS 405 (1986).
- The Bernard van Dieren Collection: Songs for High Voice and String Quartet, Heine Songs, Song from The Cenci, Rhapsodia, Sonata for solo violin, Sonatina Tyroica, Estemporales for harp. Ludmilla Andrew, Philip Thomas, Emperor String Quartet etc., British Music Society BML 001 (1992).
- String Quartets from the Twenties: String Quartet No 6. Utrecht String Quartet, NM Classics (2000).
- Chinese Symphony: Symphony No.1 Chinese Op.6, Intriot, Elegy for cello and orchestra. BBC National Orchestra and Chorus of Wales, conducted by William Boughton, Raphael Wallfisch (cello), Lyrita (2016).
- Ronald Stevenson, Piano Music Vol. Five: Transcription of String Quartet No 5 for piano. Christopher Guild (piano). Toccata Classics TOCC0606 (2021)
- Complete Piano Music: (also includes Ballad de Villon). Christopher Guild. Piano Classics PCL10241 (2022)

There are also a dozen or so recordings on YouTube that haven't been commercially released, including songs, piano works and the String Quartets Nos 1, 4 and 5.
