= Philip Cannon =

Philip Can(n)on may refer to:

- Philip Cannon (composer) (1929–2016), British composer
- Philip L. Cannon (1850–1929), first Lieutenant Governor of Delaware
- Philip Canon, Member of Parliament (MP) for Dunwich
