= Archibald Jacob (musician) =

English composer (1888–1959)

George Archibald Forlong Jacob (16 September 1888 - 11 October 1959) was an English arranger, composer and author, older brother of the composer and orchestrator Gordon Jacob.

Jacob was born in Bedford. His father was Colonel Stephen Jacob, an official of the Indian Civil Service based in Calcutta who died in 1898, and his wife, Clara Laura, née Forlong. The family was musical: his brother Ansty (later killed in the Battle of the Somme) played the cornet. Another brother, Charles Theodore played the flute, wrote songs and composed a duet for cornet and piano for Ansty and his youngest brother Gordon Jacob to play. While a student at King's College, Cambridge, Jacob discovered the music of Vaughan Williams and brought home scores (such as The Wasps, produced in Cambridge in 1909 and the Sea Symphony performed there in 1910) to play through with Gordon on the piano.

Archibald Jacob composed choral music and songs, published by Oxford University Press, including Banks of Roses, Country Girl's Farewell and The Ship of Rio, and some educational piano works such as the Five Finger Sonatina (1937). He contributed piano arrangements to The Daily Express Community Songbook (1927) edited by the baritone John Goss. But he is best known today for his arrangements of orchestral works for piano duet. These include the Vaughan Williams London Symphony in 1924, which has been recorded by Lynn Arnold and Charles Matthews. Jacob produced the piano duet reduction of Constant Lambert's choral orchestral work Summer's Last Will and Testament (1936). In the score, Lambert says he asked Jacob to produce "a clear presentation of the contrapuntal texture of the full score rather than a pianistic transcription". He also produced the piano reduction of the choral and orchestral setting of Ode to a Grecian Urn (1931) by Philip Napier Miles.

Jacob was the author of Musical Handwriting: or How to Put Music on Paper: A Handbook for All Musicians, Professional and Amateurs (1937), said to have been the only book on the subject at its time of publication, with a preface by Sir Henry Wood. Jacob also provided notes on the music for Songs of Praise Discussed (1933), Percy Dearmer's commentary on the literature of hymns.
