= Hans Kindler =

Dutch American cellist and conductor (1892–1949)

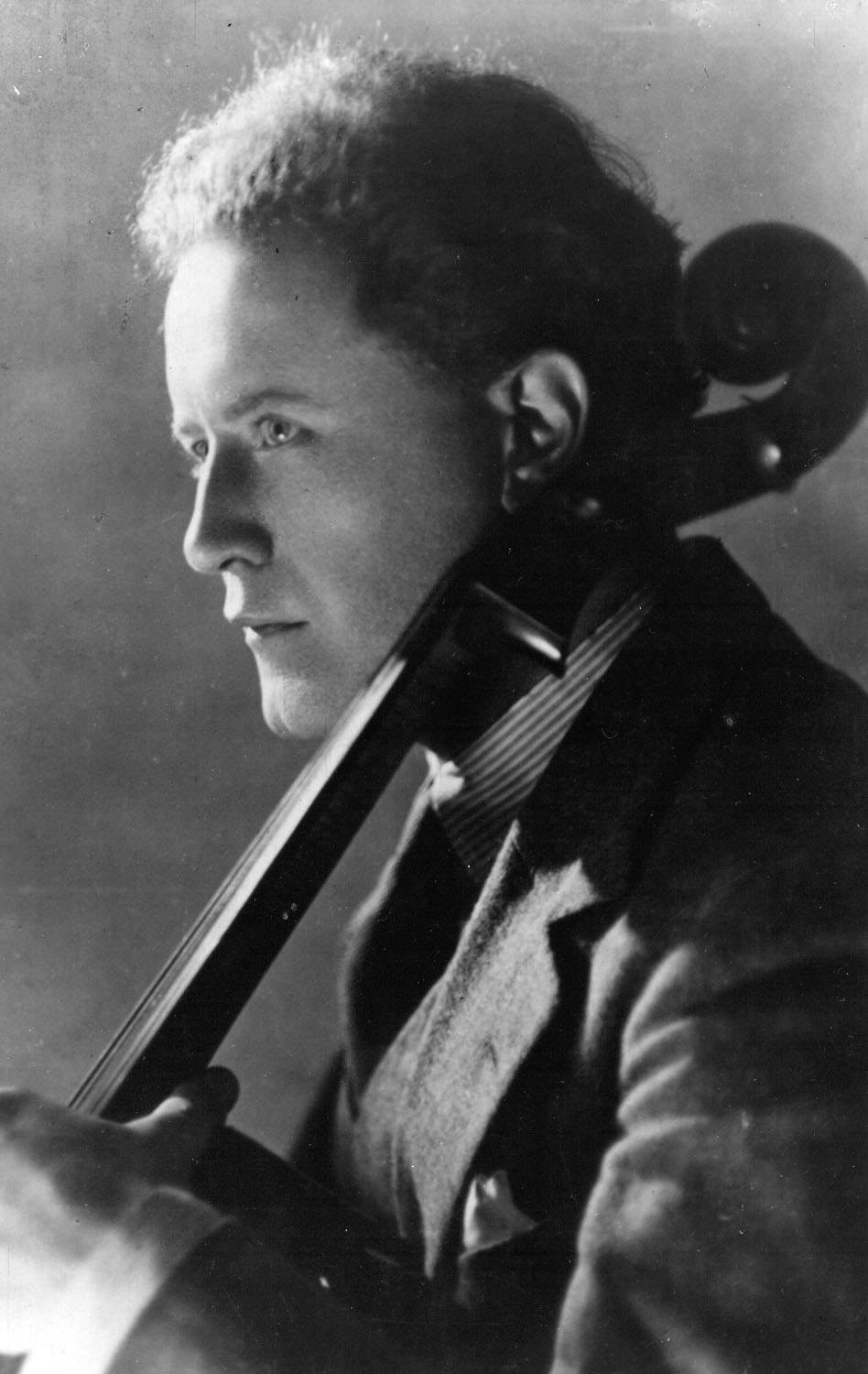
Kindler in ca. 1910

Johannes Hendrikus Philip Kindler (January 8, 1892 – August 30, 1949) was a Dutch American cellist and conductor who founded the National Symphony Orchestra. He was married to painter Alice Kindler and Persis Chase Myers.

== Kindler as cellist ==
Kindler was born in Rotterdam as the child of the oboist and conductor Johan Karl Eduard Kindler (1838–1899) and Johannetta Filippina Maria Hanken. His older sister was the concert pianist Frida Kindler, later the wife of composer Bernard van Dieren. Kindler made his public debut aged 10 and took first prizes in cello and piano at the Rotterdam Conservatory in 1906. He studied under Jean Gerardy and Pablo Casals.

In 1910 Kindler appeared as a soloist with the Berlin Philharmonic. On 16 October 1912 he appeared as the cellist in the premiere of Schoenberg's Pierrot Lunaire in Berlin. He made a considerable reputation in Europe, but when he went to the US in 1914 to further his career, the outbreak of the First World War prevented his return.

He immediately joined the Philadelphia Orchestra and was appointed first cello by Stokowski in 1916. That same year he gave the world premiere of Bloch's Schelomo at Carnegie Hall. He stayed in Philadelphia until 1920 when he returned to Europe (Senlis, France), married his wife Alice (there were three children) and resumed his solo career, both as a concerto soloist under such conductors as Mengelberg, Monteux and Reiner, and collaborating in chamber music recitals with Ravel and Rachmaninov. He gave first performances of works by Ravel and Schoenberg, and Ferruccio Busoni dedicated an arrangement of Bach's Chromatic Fantasy and Fugue for cello and piano to him. In 1929 he made extensive tours of the US and Europe and also visited the Far East. But by now he had become an American citizen and taken up conducting and this led to a new career.

== Kindler as conductor ==
Kindler made his conducting debut in 1927 with the Philadelphia Orchestra and the following year conducted the world premiere of Stravinsky's ballet Apollon musagète in Washington, commissioned by Elizabeth Sprague Coolidge. He then devoted himself entirely to conducting, a move which led him to found a brand new orchestra. This occurred in 1931 when he formed the National Symphony Orchestra (NSO) in Washington, DC. Despite the Depression, the venture was a great success and resulted in many nationwide tours. Kindler was a champion of modern composers and introduced many new works to his audiences. He also achieved high praise for his moulding of the NSO and it was soon being ranked alongside the orchestras in Boston and Philadelphia.

He stayed with the NSO for many years and in David Ewen's Dictators of the Baton (1948) the author wrote: "Kindler may not rise to those empyrean heights to which some other conductors may soar, but he is a self-respecting and respected musician who does justice to the great music he performs, and serves his art with humility." That same year he guest-conducted in Europe and received plaudits from critics in Germany and Denmark who compared him with Weingartner and Toscanini. However, post-war conditions at the National Symphony Orchestra had deteriorated, as had Kindler's health, so he resigned on 30 November 1948 and gave his farewell concert the following March. Following a serious operation he died a few months later, on August 30, 1949, at Watch Hill, Rhode Island.

Following his death, Kindler's library of orchestral performance sets was donated to DC Public Library in 1951. This special collection includes over 900 titles and is available for use, free of charge, by orchestras and ensembles in the Washington Metropolitan region.

== Kindler on record ==
External audio
- Hans Kindler conducting Bedřich Smetana's symphonic poem The Moldau from Má Vlast with his National Symphony Orchestra in 1942 Here on archive.org
- Hans Kindler conducting Armas Järnefelt's Praeludiem and Berceuse with his National Symphony Orchestra in 1947 Here on archive.org
- Hans Kindler conducting George Enescu's Romanian Rhapsody No. 2 in D minor, Op. 11 with the National Symphony Orchestra in 1940 Here on archive.org

Kindler made his first recordings as a cellist for Victor by the old acoustic method during the First World War. Following the introduction of electrical recording, he made a number of discs for Decca in 1929. His first recordings as a conductor were made for RCA Victor in 1940 and these included the first recording of William Schuman's American Festival Overture and the first American recording of Tchaikovsky's 3rd Symphony. Subsequent record sessions in 1941, 1942 and 1945 found Kindler recording such novelties and rarities as George Whitefield Chadwick's Noel, Mary Howe's Stars, Jaromir Weinberger's Czech Rhapsody, and Dai-Keong Lee's Prelude and Hula. These were recorded alongside more staple orchestral fare, such as Richard Strauss's Don Juan, Bedřich Smetana's Vltava, and Johannes Brahms' 3rd Symphony which was praised for its "vitality and the glowing brilliance of the orchestra's execution."

== Reputation ==
According to the WPA Guide to Washington, originally published in 1942: "Potential symphony players had left Washington during the years of musical drought, and Kindler found it necessary to combine local talent with musicians imported from New York, Philadelphia and Boston." However even in the worst year of the Great Depression Kindler managed to create his orchestra. According to violinist Milton Schwarz, "He was a famous cellist and the first chair of the cello section of the Philadelphia Orchestra. I had heard of him and heard him play. He was indeed very fine."

He was a National Patron of Delta Omicron, an international professional music fraternity.

The Kindler Foundation Trust Fund was established in 1983 by the Kindler Foundation to offer concerts and to commission new chamber music in his memory.
