= Frida Kindler =

Dutch pianist active in Britain (1879–1964)

Frida Carola Johanetta Kindler (1879 – 26 January 1964) was a Dutch concert pianist and teacher active in the UK, a pupil of Busoni and later the wife of composer Bernard van Dieren.

Kindler was born in Rotterdam. Her father was the oboist and conductor Johan Karl Eduard Kindler (1838–1899) and her younger brother was the cellist (and later conductor) Hans Kindler. She attended the Berlin Conservatoire and Busoni's master classes of 1900–1901. Busoni dedicated his 1908 piano piece Nuit de Noël to Kindler.

She made her UK debut in Birmingham in 1903 and played at the Proms in London on 11 September 1906. During this period she bagan a long-term friendship with the headmistress Emmeline Tanner, coming to play at Sherborne, and later at her other schools, even teaching for a while at Bedford High School.

In 1909 Frida relocated permanently to England with Bernard van Dieren, a composer ten years her junior, whom she married on 1 January 1910. A son, Hans Jean Jules Maximilian Navarre Benvenuto Bernard van Dieren (1910–74, known as Bernard), was born the same year. They settled at 35A St George's Road, West Hampstead in the 1920s, and later at 68, Clifton Hill, St John's Wood. But by 1912 her husband's ill-health was already holding back her career as a virtuoso pianist, which over time she sacrificed to support his survival and his work as a composer, though she did continue to premiere most of her husband's piano works.

On the evening of Tuesday 16 December 1930 Frida and Bernard van Dieren met Peter Warlock at the Duke of Wellington pub near Sloane Square, then went back to his basement flat at 30 Tite Street, where they stayed until after midnight. They were the last to see him alive: he was found dead the following morning from coal-gas poisoning.

Frida continued teaching, and resumed performing after van Dieren's death in 1936. Her pupils included Dorothy E. Bradshaw, Robert Collett, Eiluned Davies, the Scottish pianist Virginia Fortesque and the American pianist Thomas Lishman. Denis ApIvor reported her suffering from dementia in her last years. A year before her death her Steinway grand piano was put up for sale at the Steinway showrooms in Hanover Square. She died in January 1964, aged 84.
