= Horoscope (ballet) =

Horoscope is a ballet created in 1937 by Frederick Ashton with scenery by Sophie Fedorovitch and music by Constant Lambert. It is based on astrological themes, and is reminiscent of Gustav Holst's The Planets in its musical exploration of the mystical.

== Background ==
Lambert had a strong interest in astrology and the programme note for the premiere by him how the zodiac determines the course of the ballet. The story of the ballet concerns a young man and woman who were born in the disjoint Sun signs of Leo and Virgo. However, both have their Moon in Gemini, and they are able to overcome their fate and become lovers. It had its first performance by the Vic-Wells Ballet at Sadler's Wells Theatre on 27 January 1938, starring Margot Fonteyn and Michael Somes, and it made stars of both principal dancers, but particularly Michael Somes, who was described by one critic as potentially the finest British male dancer of the half century. At that time Constant Lambert was conducting an affair with the young Margot Fonteyn, but they later separated. The ballet has been described as a symbolic representation of this affair. Other roles were danced by Richard Ellis and Alan Carter (the Gemini), and Pamela May (the Moon).

The ballet was praised by the critics: Francis Toye called it ... perhaps the most successful modern ballet that has been produced at this theatre for a long time. Arnold Haskell wrote: With Horoscope, ballet, now truly indigenous in England, readies a splendid maturity.

Horoscope was to be Lambert's last original work for 14 years, during which time he concentrated on conducting and touring.

== Structure ==
The full score was lost in the Netherlands, only nine numbers surviving. The Vic-Wells Ballet was touring there in 1940 when German forces occupied the country, and they had to escape hurriedly, leaving behind scenery, costumes, and the full scores to both Horoscope and The Wise Virgins (an arrangement of Bach's music by William Walton). The work had had only 29 performances and was never revived.

The nine surviving numbers are:

- "Palindromic Prelude"
- "Dance for the Followers of Leo"
- "Saraband for the Followers of Virgo"
- "Man's Variation"
- "Woman's Variation"
- "Bacchanale"
- "Valse for the Gemini"
- "Pas de Deux"
- "Invocation to the Moon and Finale".

Lambert had claimed that the theme of the Prelude was dictated to him by the ghost of Bernard van Dieren; Ashton suggested the tune for the Invocation to the Moon. For many years, the music for Horoscope was known only in the form of an abridged concert suite of five numbers that contained, according to contemporary commentators, the best of the music. The first performance of the suite was conducted by Lambert himself at Queen's Hall on 8 August 1938 as part of the Proms season. Lambert recorded three of the movements ("Dance for the Followers of Leo", "Valse for the Gemini" and the "Invocation to the Moon and Finale") in 1945, with the Liverpool Philharmonic Orchestra. That was the first recording of any of the music from the ballet. In 1949, Lambert recorded two more numbers, "Saraband for the Followers of Virgo" and "Bacchanale", with the Philharmonia Orchestra. The five-movement Horoscope Suite was later recorded by the London Symphony Orchestra under Robert Irving (1953) and the English Northern Philharmonia under David Lloyd-Jones (1990).

In March 2003, the nine surviving numbers were recorded complete for the first time, by the BBC Concert Orchestra under Barry Wordsworth.

In April 2024, pianists Ben Costello and Joseph Tong gave the premiere of Costello's transcription for two pianos of the complete ballet. This transcription was created with the permission of the Lambert Estate.
