= Alan Carter (dancer) =

English dancer (1920–2009)

Alan Carter (24 December 1920 – 30 June 2009), was an English ballet dancer, choreographer, teacher, and company director, active in numerous countries in Europe and the Middle East. Perhaps best remembered for his work in films, notably The Red Shoes and The Tales of Hoffmann, he was known in his later years as a ballet master and as a gifted painter, pianist, composer, and writer.

== Early life and training ==
Born in London on Christmas Eve of 1920, Alan Carter became interest in ballet in his boyhood. When he reached his early teens, he began training at Serafina Astafieva's Russian Dancing Academy at The Pheasantry on King's Road in Chelsea. Astafieva had danced with the Mariinsky Ballet in Saint Petersburg and with Sergei Diaghilev's Ballets Russes before opening her school in London, where she was highly regarded as a teacher. Carter then moved on to advanced classes with Nikolai Legat, another well-known Russian teacher, who had danced with the Imperial Russian Ballet for many years before moving to London to escape the social unrest that threatened to overthrow the tsarist autocracy. From these two teachers, Carter received a thorough grounding in classical ballet technique. He completed his education at the Italia Conti Academy of Theatre Arts, located in a church building on Conduit Street, where he studied acting and stagecraft as well as dance.

== Professional career ==
In 1937, Carter joined the corps of the Vic-Wells Ballet (later called the Sadler's Wells Ballet, now the Royal Ballet) and was soon promoted to soloist. In 1938, Frederick Ashton, principal choreographer of the company, cast him and Richard Ellis as the Gemini in Constant Lambert's ballet Horoscope and then entrusted him with the title role in a revised and extended version of Harlequin in the Street, set to music by François Couperin. June Brae and Michael Somes were the formal lovers in this lighthearted pièce, but "sixteen-year-old Alan Carter as Harlequin stole most of the acclaim. His clean, easy technique encouraged Ashton to experiment again with virtuosic choreography, resulting in a lively display of bouncing batterie and nimble footwork." Carter was part of the Sadler's Wells Ballet touring party who were stranded in the Netherlands while on a propaganda tour when the Germans invaded in May 1940. Helpmann and the company were on the last British boat to be evacuated as the Dutch surrendered. The true story of his escape from Holland during the German invasion is told in the book Escape From Holland by Chris Hunt.

For the next few years, Carter continued to display his virtuosity in many roles in the company repertory, until he was called up for military service in 1941. After serving five years in the Royal Air Force during World War II, he returned to London and joined the newly formed Sadler's Wells Theatre Ballet in 1946 as principal dancer and choreographer. His first ballet was The Catch, set to music by Béla Bartok, in which he himself took the principal role of the Elder Brother. À reviewer for The Stage commented that Carter had used Bartok's music "with imagination and skill."

Carter then moved on to films, serving as ballet master for The Red Shoes (1948) and The Tales of Hoffmann (1951), both produced by the team of Michael Powell and Emeric Pressburger, both starring ballerina Moira Shearer, and both featuring characters portrayed by Robert Helpmann and Léonide Massine. Carter also served as choreographer of the British comedy film The Man Who Loved Redheads (1955), again starring Moira Shearer. Following that, he was ballet master for two Hollywood films. Invitation to the Dance (1956) is an anthology of three stories, each featuring Gene Kelly. Other dancers in the cast include Tamara Toumanova, Igor Youskevitch, Diana Adams, Tommy Rall, and Carol Haney. Ballerina (also 1956), directed by Georg Wilhelm Pabst, stars Elisabeth Muller as a famous ballerina stricken with polio and worried that her understudy will usurp her place.

While doing his film work, Carter formed and directed the St. James Ballet for the Arts Council of Great Britain, also serving it as choreographer and dancer. In the early 1950s, he was ballet master and choreographer to the famed Empire Cinema, on Leicester Square, and choreographer of dance numbers for the London Palladium Show. The international phase of his career began in 1954, with his appointment as director of the Bayerische Staatsballett (Bavarian State Ballet) in Munich, Germany. Thereafter he worked as company director and choreographer in the Netherlands, Israël, Norway, France, Turkey, Finland, Iceland, and Iran. In 1976, he became artistic co-director, with Felicity Gray, of the Elmhurst School for Dance, a residential school in Camberley, Surrey, combining dance studies with academics, now affiliated with the Birmingham Royal Ballet.

== Personal and later life ==
Carter was married to fellow dancer Julia Murthwaite, who started the junior division of the Elmhurst School. In 1977, they moved to Bournemouth, on the southern coast, where they eventually took over the Wessex School of Dancing and became active in the local ballet club. During their years there, Carter mounted productions of Coppélia, The Sleeping Beauty, and other works for the Bournemouth Ballet Club and choreographed and directed the musicals My Fair Lady and Annie Get Your Gun for the Bournemouth and Boscombe Light Opera Company.

Once their daughter Alexandra was in university, the Carters began to spend winters in Spain, where they often offered a warm refuge to friends from the chilly climate of England. During his later years, Carter spent much time at his drawing table and his easel, creating images of dancers and dancing that he called "choreographics." Besides drawing and painting, he enjoyed playing the piano, reading, and gardening. The couple returned permanently to Bournemouth when Carter's health began to deteriorate from the effects of cancer. After several years of illness, eased by the devoted care of his wife, he died peacefully at home at the age of 88.
