= A London Symphony =

2nd symphony composed by Ralph Vaughan Williams

Vaughan Williams in 1913

A London Symphony is the second symphony that Ralph Vaughan Williams composed. The work is sometimes referred to as Symphony No. 2, though the composer did not designate that name for the work. First performed in 1914, the original score of this four-movement symphony was lost and subsequently reconstructed. Vaughan Williams continued revisions of the work into its final definitive form, which was published in 1936.

== Background and premiere ==
The first mention of A London Symphony is in a letter from Vaughan Williams to Cecil Sharp in July 1911: "I am in the middle of a great work & unless I get stuck in it I don't want to leave it". In the view of his biographer Michael Kennedy, the composer's comment suggests he may have begun to compose the work as early as 1910. His friend and fellow composer George Butterworth had urged him to write a symphony:

One of my most grateful memories of George is connected with my "London Symphony". Indeed I owe its whole idea to him. I remember very well how the idea originated. He had been sitting with us one evening talking, smoking & playing … At the end of the evening just as he was getting up to go he said in his characteristically abrupt way "You know, you ought to write a symphony". From that moment the idea of a symphony – a thing which I had always declared I would never attempt – dominated my mind.

In a programme note written in 1925 the composer set out his intentions in writing the symphony:

It has been suggested that this symphony has been misnamed, it should rather be called "Symphony by a Londoner". That is to say it is in no sense descriptive, and though the introduction of the "Westminster Chimes" in the first movement, the slight reminiscence of the "Lavender Cry" in the slow movement, and the very faint suggestion of mouth organs and mechanical pianos in the Scherzo give it a tinge of "local colour", yet it is intended to be listened to as "absolute" music.

The work was first performed on 27 March 1914 at the Queen's Hall, London, conducted by Geoffrey Toye. The performance was a success. The press reports mention the cordiality of its reception, the first movement in particular being "tremendously applauded", according to the music critic Richard Capell, who found the slow movement "one of the noblest symphonic pieces in modern English music". The Times commented, "His harmonic freedom is exhilarating. ... A ragtime tune in the first movement, the cry of the lavender sellers in the lento, the 'hoochy-koochy' chords, such as a youth sucks from a mouth-organ, preluding the first trio of the scherzo, are pieces of realism, plain enough to make the dull listener imagine that it is all a fantasy on street music. But it is much more than that; it is a symphony, a work written solely in music and meant to appeal solely to the musical imagination of the hearers". The Musical Times observed, "There is a big impulse, a big rhythmic line underlying the whole design which makes it a real symphony and a real reflection of the London spirit, a spirit which we feel all the more strongly because it is disguised beneath a myriad attractions and distractions".

== Instrumentation ==
The work is scored for:

- Woodwinds: three flutes (the third doubling piccolo), two oboes, cor anglais, two clarinets, bass clarinet, two bassoons, contrabassoon
- Brass: four horns, two trumpets, two cornets, three trombones, tuba
- Percussion: timpani, bass drum, snare drum, triangle, tam-tam, sleigh bells, cymbals, glockenspiel
- Strings: harp, and strings.

== Structure ==
The symphony has four movements:

1. Lento – Allegro risoluto
2. Lento
3. Scherzo (Nocturne)
4. Finale – Andante con moto – Maestoso alla marcia – Allegro – Lento – Epilogue

=== I. Lento – Allegro risoluto ===
The composer's programme note says, "There are four movements: The first begins with a slow prelude; this leads to a vigorous allegro – which may perhaps suggest the noise and hurry of London, with its always underlying calm". The symphony opens quietly, and after a few nocturnal bars, the Westminster chimes are heard, played on the harp.

After a silent pause, the allegro risoluto section, much of it triple forte, is vigorous and brisk, and the ensuing second subject, dominated by the wind and brass, is no less so (evoking "Hampstead Heath on an August Bank Holiday")

After a contrasting gentle interlude scored for string sextet and harp, the vigorous themes return and bring the movement to a lively close, with full orchestra playing fortissimo.

=== II. Lento ===
The composer wrote, "The second (slow) movement has been called 'Bloomsbury Square on a November afternoon'. This may serve as a clue to the music, but it is not a necessary "explanation" of it. The movement opens with muted strings playing ppp.

Quiet themes led in turn by cor anglais, flute, trumpet and viola give way to a grave, impassioned forte section, after which the movement gradually subsides to its original quiet dynamic.

=== III. Scherzo (Nocturne) ===
In the composer's words, "If the listener will imagine himself standing on Westminster Embankment at night, surrounded by the distant sounds of The Strand, with its great hotels on one side and the "New Cut" on the other, with its crowded streets and flaring lights, it may serve as a mood in which to listen to this movement." In the definitive score, the movement revolves around two scherzo themes, the first marked fugato and the second straightforward and lively.

The piece closes with muted strings playing pppp.

=== IV. Finale – Andante con moto – Maestoso alla marcia – Allegro – Lento – Epilogue ===
The composer's note says "The last movement consists of an agitated theme in three-time, alternating with a march movement, at first solemn and later on energetic. At the end of the finale comes a suggestion of the noise and fever of the first movement – this time much subdued – then the "Westminster Chimes" are heard once more: on this follows an 'Epilogue' in which the slow prelude is developed into a movement of some length". The finale opens on a grave march theme, punctuated with a lighter allegro section, with full orchestra initially forte and appassionato. After the reappearance of the march, the main allegro theme of the first movement returns. Following this, the Westminster Chimes strike again, this time the harp plays the first three-quarters of the hour chimes, and there is a quiet Epilogue, inspired by the last chapter of H. G. Wells's novel Tono-Bungay:

The last great movement in the London Symphony in which the true scheme of the old order is altogether dwarfed and swallowed up ... Light after light goes down. England and the Kingdom, Britain and the Empire, the old prides and the old devotions, glide abeam, astern, sink down upon the horizon, pass – pass. The river passes – London passes, England passes.

== Later history and versions ==
Shortly after the first performance the composer sent the manuscript score to the conductor Fritz Busch in Germany, and it disappeared in the upheaval of the outbreak of the First World War. Butterworth, aided by Toye, and the critic E. J. Dent, reconstructed the score from the orchestral parts, and the reconstruction was performed on 11 February 1915 by the Bournemouth Municipal Orchestra under Dan Godfrey (deputising for the composer, whose wartime duties in the army prevented him from being there).

The symphony went through several revisions before reaching its final form. Vaughan Williams revised it for a performance in March 1918, conducted by Adrian Boult. and again in 1919–1920, a version which Albert Coates premiered at the Queen's Hall. The third and final revision was first given by Sir Thomas Beecham and the London Philharmonic Orchestra in 1934. The second revision became the first published version, and was recorded for the gramophone in 1925 by the London Symphony Orchestra conducted by Sir Dan Godfrey. The final version was published in 1936.

In 2000 the composer's widow, Ursula, gave permission for a studio recording of the original 1914 score, which was issued by Chandos Records in 2001. The new recording attracted attention from various music critics, including some comment that in his subsequent revisions the composer had cut many bars of interesting music. Richard Tiedman commented, "The 1913 score is more meditative, dark-shaded and tragic in tone, almost Mahleresque in its inclusiveness. By 1933 Vaughan Williams's concept of symphonic architecture was becoming more aligned with a Sibelian logic and severity." The Guardian's music critic, Andrew Clements, commented:

Some of the excisions seem to have been sensible – the finale is dangerously episodic in the first version ... Much of what was removed is music of vivid poetic description. Admirers of Vaughan Williams will certainly want to hear all this restored music, some of it of a very high quality indeed, and while it does not supplant the version of the work that we know, it makes a very worthwhile addition to the catalogue.

Kennedy wrote:

There can be no question of the original version supplanting the revision. The 1936 score represents the symphony as Vaughan Williams wanted it to exist for posterity. The cuts and re-scorings were his own decisions, not forced on him, like Bruckner's, by well-meaning friends. Vaughan Williams would, and did, ask for advice, but never took it against his own inclinations.

The main differences between the first and last versions may be summarised as follows:

- First movement: One bar was cut from the 1914 version.
- Slow movement: 52 bars of the 1914 score were cut in 1933/36, chiefly from the quiet coda.
- Scherzo: At the end of the original is a dark andantino passage, of which no trace survives in the definitive version.
- Finale: In the 1914 score, the central E minor section, familiar in the definitive text, is interrupted by an orchestral "cry of anguish" based on the opening theme, after which the allegro resumes. After the conclusion of the allegro section, the 1914 score has a long andantino section for strings and woodwinds later dismissed by Vaughan Williams as "a bad hymn tune". Finally, the original Epilogue extends to 109 bars.

Below is a summary of the changes made between the original and the two published versions. It shows the number of bars in each movement and the total for the whole symphony:

Version	Mvt I	Mvt II	Mvt III	Mvt IV	Epilogue	Total
1914	408	202	386	227	109	1322
1920	407	162	398	173	85	1225
1936	407	150	398	162	60	1177

The final version is around twenty minutes shorter than the original, as some indicative timings show:

1914 version:

- London Symphony Orchestra/Richard Hickox: 61:19 (I: 15:04; II: 16:16; III: 11:04; IV: 18:50)

1920 revision:

- London Symphony Orchestra/Sir Dan Godfrey (rec 1925): 44:39 (I:13:37: II:12:17; III: 7:07; IV: 11:45) [Godfrey had already recorded the first movement (very heavily cut) and second movement (complete) in 1923, with the same forces. However, this later recording is still not a complete performance, since he now cut 23 bars from the Epilogue in order that it would fit on to 12 sides. The cut was from 9 bars after T until W. This is exactly what the composer would later do for the 1933 final version, leaving the suspicion that he may have been influenced by Godfrey's recording.]
- Cincinnati Symphony Orchestra/Eugene Goossens (rec 1941): 38:45 (I:11:06: II:9:22; III: 5:09; IV: 13:15) [This performance makes no cuts, but does not play the repeat in the third movement.]

1933/36 revision:

- Queen's Hall Orchestra/Sir Henry Wood (rec 1936): 37:09 (I:11:40: II:8:39; III: 5:21; IV: 10:49)
- London Philharmonic Orchestra/Sir Adrian Boult (rec 1971): 43:03 (I: 14:24; II: 9:32; III:7:07; IV:12:00)

The reception accorded to the Chandos recording of the 1914 score persuaded Ursula Vaughan Williams to authorise a live performance of the original version. In November 2003, Richard Hickox conducted the original 1914 score with the London Symphony Orchestra at the Barbican, in the first live performance of this version since 1918. The Proms presented an additional live performance of the 1914 version on 19 July 2005, with Hickox conducting the BBC National Orchestra of Wales.

== Recordings ==
Conductor	Orchestra	Year	Ref
1914 version			
Richard Hickox	London Symphony	2000	
1920 version			
Sir Dan Godfrey	London Symphony	1925	
Eugene Goossens	Cincinnati Symphony	1941	
Martin Yates	Royal Scottish National	2015	
Martyn Brabbins	BBC Symphony	2016	
1936 version			
Sir Henry Wood	Queen's Hall	1936	
Dimitri Mitropoulos	NBC Symphony	1945	
Ralph Vaughan Williams	London Symphony	1946	
Sir Adrian Boult	London Philharmonic	1952	
Sir John Barbirolli	Hallé	1957	
Sir Malcolm Sargent	Chicago Symphony	1967	
Sir John Barbirolli	Hallé	1967	
Sir Adrian Boult	London Philharmonic	1971	
André Previn	London Symphony	1972	
Vernon Handley	London Philharmonic	1977	
André Previn	Royal Philharmonic	1986	
Bernard Haitink	London Philharmonic	1986	
Bryden Thomson	London Symphony	1988	
Gennady Rozhdestvensky	USSR State Symphony	1988	
Owain Arwel Hughes	Philharmonia	1988	
Leonard Slatkin	Philharmonia	1991	
Vernon Handley	Royal Liverpool Philharmonic	1992	
Andrew Davis	BBC Symphony	1993	
Kees Bakels	Bournemouth Symphony	1993	
Roger Norrington	London Philharmonic	1996	
Christopher Seaman	Melbourne Symphony	2005	
Owain Arwel Hughes	National Youth Orchestra of Wales	2009	
Sir Mark Elder	Hallé	2010	
Christopher Seaman	Rochester Philharmonic	2011	
Andrew Manze	Royal Liverpool Philharmonic	2015	
Andrew Manze	BBC Scottish Symphony	2019	

Piano arrangement

- Lynn Arnold and Charles Matthews (pianos). Arrangement of 1920 version for piano duet by Archibald Jacob (2021)

Source: WorldCat and Naxos Music Library

== Notes, references and sources ==
=== Sources ===
- Cobbe, Richard, ed. (2010). Letters of Ralph Vaughan Williams, 1895–1958. Oxford: Oxford University Press. ISBN 978-0-19-161526-9.
- Kennedy, Michael (1964). The Works of Ralph Vaughan Williams. Oxford and New York: Oxford University Press. OCLC 1391898453.
- Lee, Douglas (2002). Masterworks of 20th-century Music: The Modern Repertory of the Symphony Orchestra. London: Routledge. ISBN 978-0-415-93846-4.
- Lloyd, Stephen (1998). "Vaughan Williams's A London Symphony: The Original Version and Early Performances and Recordings". In Lewis Foreman (ed.). Vaughan Williams in Perspective : Studies of an English Composer. Ilminster: Albion Press. ISBN 978-0-95-287061-6.
- March, Ivan; Edward Greenfield; Robert Layton; Paul Czajkowski (2008). The Penguin Guide to Recorded Classical Music 2009. London: Penguin. ISBN 978-0-141-03335-8.
- Vaughan Williams, Ralph (2008). David Manning (ed.). Vaughan Williams on Music. Oxford and New York: Oxford University Press. ISBN 978-0-19-518239-2.
