= Alice Kindler =

American painter

- Born: Alice Riddle; October 3, 1892; Germantown, Pennsylvania
- Died: 1980
- Other names: Alice L. Riddle Kindler, Mrs. Hans Kindler
- Occupations: artist, muralist, lithographer, teacher

Alice L. Riddle Kindler (October 3, 1892 — 1980) was an American painter and teacher born in Germantown, Pennsylvania.

== Education ==
Alice Riddle studied at the Pennsylvania Academy of the Fine Arts and at the Philadelphia School of Design for Women After completing her studies, she won a trip to study in Europe for the summer and studied briefly at the Academie Julian in Paris. When she returned, Riddle entered and won a contest in 1915 to complete the murals for West Philadelphia High School. Two years later, Riddle won a prize from Gertrude Vanderbilt Whitney for the "Friends of Young Artists' Exhibition" held in New York City. In addition to winning the cash prize, she decorated a theater lobby as part of her award.

== Personal life ==
Riddle married Hans Kindler, a cellist and conductor, in 1920 and soon after the marriage the couple moved to Senlis, France. For almost a decade Kindler did not paint, as she was raising her three children.

In 1929 her address was listed as being in Chantilly, France, and in 1939 the couple were living in Baltimore, Maryland She taught art at St. Timothy's School in Catonsville, Maryland. In 1939 Kindler was commissioned by the WPA to complete a mural for the post office in Ware Shoals, South Carolina. The WPA was the largest and most ambitious American New Deal agency, employing individuals to carry out public works projects. The finished product mural was completed in 1940 and titled, American Landscape. Hans Kindler died in 1949. In 1959 Alice moved back to Senlis where she painted continually until 1975. She died in London in 1980.

== Work ==
- 1915 "The Canterbury Pilgrimage" mural West Philadelphia High School, Philadelphia, Pennsylvania.
- 1940 "American Landscape" United States Post Office mural, Ware Shoals, South Carolina.
