= Summer's Last Will and Testament =

Elizabethan stage play by Thomas Nashe

Summer's Last Will and Testament is an Elizabethan stage play, a comedy written by Thomas Nashe. The play is notable for breaking new ground in the development of English Renaissance drama. The literary scholar George Richard Hibbard says "No earlier English comedy has anything like the intellectual content or the social relevance that it has."

Although Nashe is known as an Elizabethan playwright, Summer's Last Will and Testament is his only extant solo-authored play; his other surviving dramatic work, Dido, Queen of Carthage, is a collaboration with Christopher Marlowe, in which Nashe's role was probably very minimal.

== Publication ==
The play was entered into the Stationers' Register on 28 October 1600, and was published before the end of that year in a quarto printed by Simon Stafford for the bookseller Walter Burre. (Burre is best known for his publication of first editions of the plays of Ben Jonson.) The 1600 quarto was the only edition of the play prior to the nineteenth century.

== Date and performance ==
No external evidence indicates the date of the authorship or first performance of the play; but the text of the work is rich in allusions and references that bear upon the question of its date. The text refers to a progress through the English countryside by Queen Elizabeth I, and also to an outbreak of bubonic plague and a severe drought that lowered the level of the River Thames to an unusual extreme. Scholars agree that 1592 is the one year that best matches these references.

The play was not performed by professional adult actors in one of the London theatres, which in any case were closed due to the plague epidemic in 1592. References and allusions in the play suggest that the drama was staged in Croydon at Croydon Palace, the manor house of the Archbishops of Canterbury; the Archbishop at the time was John Whitgift. The cast was composed at least in part of amateurs, including boys who served as pages in the Archbishop's household; the cast may have been supplemented by experienced boy actors from the established London troupes, the Children of Paul's or the Children of the Chapel. The performance occurred "in this latter end of summer", probably in the second half of September or the first half of October 1592.

== Genre ==
Nashe developed Summer's Last Will and Testament out of the interlude form that was popular in the royal and noble courts of sixteenth-century England; and he anticipates the masque that would evolve during the Jacobean and Caroline eras. The play can be seen as a bridge between the 16th-century interlude and the 17th-century masque; it features personifications of the four seasons, Summer, Autumn, Winter, and "Ver." Summer is the "king of the world", but now old and declining, and ready to make his will. First, all the officers and members of the kingdom are summoned to yield their accounts. The presences of Bacchus, satyrs, nymphs, hunters, reapers, maids and clowns and Morris dancers (complete with hobby horse), give the play a strongly pastoral feeling.

The term "summer" in the title has a double meaning: the play is introduced and presented by the figure of Will Summer, or Summers, the jester of King Henry VIII. Summers had an enduring reputation with the Elizabethan public; he would be brought back to the stage by Samuel Rowley in When You See Me You Know Me (printed 1605). The clown-figure of Summers provides a level of satire to the morality-play style allegory of the plot.

In one view, Nashe produced his play by rewriting and expanding an earlier interlude by John Lyly that was performed in 1591. In the play, Will Summers embodies a reaction to the type of overly formal drama represented by Lyly.

The play also contains a poem that later acquired independent fame, "A Litany in Time of Plague". This contains the famous couplet, "Brightness falls from the air, Queens have died young and fair." The lyric "Spring, sweet spring" has also received attention from critics and anthologists.

== Modern adaptation ==
In 1936 the English composer Constant Lambert debuted a large-scale orchestral and choral setting of Nashe's play, which has sometimes been judged Lambert's greatest work and which Lambert himself considered his best. Lambert employed "Adieu, farewell, earth's bliss" as the conclusion of his musical setting.

In February 2022, the folk-revival band Bird in the Belly used the words from "A Litany in Time of Plague" for their song "Litany", recorded for their concept album After the City. This song represented the arrival of the White Horse, or plague.
