= Gordon Jacob (film) =

Film by Ken Russell

Gordon Jacob is a 1959 British short film (17 minutes) about Gordon Jacob from Ken Russell for the Monitor television series. It was Russell's first biopic of a composer.
