= Summer's Last Will and Testament (Lambert) =

Masque

Summer's Last Will and Testament is a choral masque or cantata by Constant Lambert, written between 1932 and 1935, and premiered in 1936. It is scored for chorus and orchestra, with a baritone solo also featured in the last of its seven movements. It is based on the play of the same name by Thomas Nashe, written around 1592. Lambert considered the work his magnum opus, and it is his largest work in any genre. However, it attracted little attention at its 1936 premiere and had only one or two other performances in Lambert's lifetime (he died in 1951).

In 1949, Lambert said to Sir Frederick Ashton: "I like Summer's Last Will and Testament the best of all my work". Malcolm Arnold called it "one of the undiscovered treasures of the English choral repertoire".

== Background and premiere ==
Summer's Last Will and Testament was written between 1932 and 1935, a period in which Lambert was busy with his conducting and orchestration duties with Sadler's Wells, conducting the London premiere of Kurt Weill's The Seven Deadly Sins (under the title Anna-Anna), and completing his book Music Ho! Lambert's friend, the conductor and composer Hyam Greenbaum provided support, ostensibly with the choral parts, but also with advice on the composition. Lambert inscribed the vocal score he gave to Greenbaum: "To Hyam Greenbaum (who as far as I remember wrote most of this work) from Constant Lambert".

The work was premiered at the Queen's Hall in London on 29 January 1936. The Philharmonic Choir, the BBC Symphony Orchestra and the baritone soloist Roy Henderson were conducted by the composer. The concert was sparsely attended. King George V had died just over a week before, and the sombre mood of the country was undoubtedly inimical to a work replete with references to plague, disease and death, and to the persistent aura of fatalism which affected much of Lambert's music. Although this tepid response could well have been anticipated under the circumstances, Lambert considered he had failed as a composer, and completed only two major works in the remaining sixteen years of his life.

The piece lasts about 55 minutes. It was dedicated "to Florence", his then wife Florence Chuter (aka Florence Kaye), whom he had married in 1931. A limited edition of the two-piano score, with six drawings by Michael Ayrton as frontispieces to the main movements, was issued by Oxford University Press in 1946.

== Later critical reception ==
Reviewing a performance conducted by the composer in May 1951, only a few months before his death, The Times called the work "extraordinarily powerful, even shattering":

From reposeful, pastoral beginnings it touches on melancholy, revives, in liquor, a remembered burst of happiness which is quickly dispelled by the horrific scherzo "King Pest," and ends in nostalgia and bitter resignation. Lambert proved himself a worthy partner for Nashe, by the mingled irony and warm humanity that they share, and by the composer's natural affinity with Elizabethan musical language.

== Movements ==
The sections of Summer's Last Will and Testament are:

- Intrata (orchestra alone)
- Madrigal con ritornelli: Fair Summer droops (orchestra and chorus)
- Corante: Spring, the sweet Spring (orchestra and chorus)
- Brawles: Trip and go, heave and ho! (orchestra and chorus)
- Madrigal con ritornelli: Autumn hath all the Summer's fruitful treasure (orchestra and chorus)
- Rondo burlesca: King Pest (orchestra alone)
- Saraband: Adieu, farewell earth's bliss! (orchestra, baritone solo and chorus)

King Pest is also an allusion to Edgar Allan Poe's story of the same name.

== Orchestration ==
Summer's Last Will and Testament is scored for the following forces:

- baritone solo
- chorus SATB
- 3 flutes
- 3 oboes
- 3 clarinets
- 3 bassoons
- 4 horns
- 3 trumpets
- 3 cornets
- 3 trombones
- tuba
- timpani
- percussion
- 2 harps
- strings

For the 1937 vocal score, the orchestral part was arranged for piano four-hands by Archibald Jacob. In the score, Lambert says he asked Jacob to produce "a clear presentation of the contrapuntal texture of the full score rather than a pianistic transcription". In 1947 a limited edition of the score was published with additional drawings by Michael Ayrton. 300 numbered copies were produced.

== Recording ==
Summer's Last Will and Testament has had only one complete commercial recording. This was released in 1992 by Hyperion Records, with David Lloyd-Jones conducting the English Northern Philharmonia, the Leeds Festival Chorus, and baritone soloist William Shimell. The recording session took place in the Leeds Town Hall, and was produced by Christopher Palmer. Palmer's liner notes compare the plague to AIDS, from which Palmer himself would die just three years later. The Guardian critic said the 1992 recording had made available to the public "a masterpiece buried for far too long".

Tapes of a 1965 broadcast conducted by Sir Malcolm Sargent also exist, and there were two notable revivals broadcast during the 1980s and 1990s by the BBC Concert Orchestra and Brighton Festival Chorus conducted by Norman Del Mar (10 May 1986), and by the City of Birmingham Symphony Chorus and Orchestra, conducted by Sakari Oramo (5 October 1999).

The penultimate movement, the Rondo burlesca subtitled King Pest, written for orchestra alone, has sometimes been performed separately and has been recorded separately (by Norman Del Mar and the English Chamber Orchestra, released in 2007).
