= Philip Cannon (composer) =

British composer (1929–2016)

Jack Philip Cannon (21 December 1929 – 24 December 2016) was a British composer and teacher. His choral music and songs have enjoyed extensive performances worldwide.

== Brief biography ==
Philip Cannon was born in Paris on 21 December 1929, to Franco-British parents. The family moved to Falmouth in Cornwall in 1936, where Philip was educated at the local Grammar School. Cannon subsequently studied with Imogen Holst at Dartington and with Gordon Jacob and Vaughan Williams at the Royal College of Music, where (in 1951) he was awarded the Octavia Travelling Scholarship.

In 1958 he became a lecturer in music at Sydney University, before returning to the Royal College in London in 1960 as Professor of Composition, a post which he held until his retirement in 1995. He was appointed FRCM in 1971.

Cannon's String Quartet of 1964 won two international awards in France. A number of high-profile commissions followed, including his work for 24 solo strings Oraison funèbre de l'âme humaine (1970) for French Radio, his choral work Son of Man (1975), commissioned by the BBC to mark the entry of the UK into the EEC, and three works of great beauty for the Three Choirs Festival: The Temple in 1974 (which later became a staple in the repertoire of the Bach Choir under David Willcocks), Lord of Light (1980), and A Ralegh Triptych (1992). His Te Deum (1975) was the result of a personal commission from HM Queen Elizabeth II for a work to mark the 500th anniversary of St George's Chapel, Windsor Castle.

In 2011 Cannon donated his manuscripts and other archives to the Bodleian Library at Oxford; to mark this, the composer's Te Deum was sung at Christ Church Cathedral.

Cannon's other works include; three operas (Morvoren (1964), The Man from Venus (1967), and Dr Jekyll and Mr Hyde) (a commission for BBC TV, 1973), 2 symphonies, various instrumental pieces including his Concertino for piano & strings (1949), his clarinet quintet Logos (another BBC commission, 1977), and a Septain (1995) originally created for the pianist John Ogdon., together with a number of works for voice, notably his song cycles Songs to Delight (1950), and Six Birdsongs (1993).

Cannon's String Quartet, Clarinet Quintet and his string sextet Cinq supplications sur un benediction (1985) are all available on an Olympia CD. The recording label Lyrita released a CD of Philip's works in 2017, including his Cinq Chansons de femme for soprano & harp (1952), together with his String Quartet and Lord of Light. Simon Callaghan has recorded the Concertino with the BBC National Orchestra of Wales. Recordings of performances of the Concertino, Three Rivers (1954), The Temple, Son of Man, Lord of Light, and Tip Toe Tango (1994) are also available on YouTube.

Cannon's first wife, Jacqueline, died in 1984. Cannon himself died, aged 87, on 24 December 2016 in the Florence Nightingale Hospice attached to Stoke Mandeville hospital. He is survived by his second wife, Jane, whom he married in 1997, and by his daughter (by his first marriage) Virginia.

== Musical style ==
Cannon's first opera Morvoren premiered at the Royal College in 1964. Interviewed about this opera by The Times, the composer stated "I believe that a composer should feel free to build his style from everything that is available – microtones, note clusters, electronic oscillators and the chord of C major – and make a synthesis of all the means at his disposal if by so doing he can make an impact on his audience."

In their entry for Philip Cannon in Grove Music Online, Richard Cooke and Roderic Dunnett note that Cannon's "musical personality is characterized by a fierce individualism, reflected in his use of a forthright and uncompromising musical language. The expressive drive that he can achieve with that language, sometimes tonal, occasionally atonal, yet always direct and communicative, is evident throughout his work .. his works show an intensification of thought and an endeavour to assert the potentials of the human spirit that prompted one French critic to speak of Oraison Funèbre de l'Âme Humaine as 'avant-garde romantique'".

In his article on The Sacred Choral Music of Philip Cannon, Ronald Thomas describes Cannon as "making a strong creative contribution to choral tradition .. a world figure .. a masterly composer", and observes of Cannon's first Three Choirs' commission, The Temple that the work "demonstrates a real understanding of choral composition resulting in moments of rare beauty and sensitivity to Herbert's poetry, using a combination of strong counterpoint 'with moments of stillness and exquisite chording".

Thomas quotes Cannon himself describing the structure of his Ralegh Triptych:

It is designed as one great arc from the bitter nihilism of What is our Life? through the despairing acceptance – with a slight ray of hope – of Even Such is Time to the determination of Give me my Scallop shell of quiet. I have cut out bar lines altogether; instead I have commas and pauses in between each violent outburst of Ralegh's magnificent sorties. The sounds and the silence are both integral to the overall structure. I ascribe the idea of unmetered silence and pause to Sir David Willcocks who, when conducting The Temple, suggested these, rather than metered rests, as being a more effective way of maintaining shape and emotional intensity. His casual suggestion of unmetering the silences is a good one when one takes into consideration the dramatic effects of different acoustics in different venues. For instances, The Temple's performances were in widely varying acoustics from King's College Chapel, Cambridge, to La Chapelle Royale, Versailles. The only possible snag to unmetered pauses, of course, is that the performances have to be under the direction of a very experienced, dynamitic and sensitive conductor. Not just a "metered, stick waver"!

== List of works ==
=== Operas ===
- Morvoren, 1963
- The Man from Venus, 1966–67
- Dr Jekyll and Mr Hyde, 1973

=== Orchestra ===
- Sinfonietta, (chamber orch) 1947
- Spring, (orchestra), 1949
- Piano Concertino, (piano & strings) 1949
- Fanfares, (8 tpt, 6 trombones, tuba, perc) 1963
- Oraison Funebre de l'ame humaine, (24 solo strings) 1970
- Symphony, (orchestra) 1998–9

=== Choral ===
- Songs to Delight, (SSA & strings) 1950
- Fleeting Fancies, (SATB) 1953
- Son of God, (double chorus) 1956
- To Music, (SSSA & piano) 1960
- Son of Science, (tenor, boys choir, perc, piano, strings) 1961
- Idea, (SATB) 1964
- En hiver, (SSSA) 1968
- The Temple, (SSATB) 1974
- Son of Man, (T, Bar, SATB, orch) 1975
- Te Deum, (SATB, org, (state) tpt, orch) 1975
- Lord of Light, (soprano, tenor, baritone, boys vv, SATB, org, orch) 1980
- Missa Chorea, (solo vv, double semi-chorus, double chorus) 1984
- A Ralegh Triptych, (SATB) 1989–91

=== Songs ===
- Cinq Chansons de femme (soprano & harp) 1952
- Cecilia, (1 voice & harp) 1953
- River Lullaby, (soprano & piano) 1962
- Three Rivers, (tenor & piano) 1963
- Six Bird Songs, (coloraturas & piano) 1993
- Le Mort, (baritone & piano) 1998

Instrumental

- Two Rhapsodies, (piano) 1943
- String Quartet, 1945
- String Trio, 1945
- Sextet, (flute, oboe and string quartet) 1945
- Fantasia, (string quartet) 1946
- Variations for two violins, 1946
- Variations on a canto firmo, (violin) 1948
- Galop Parisien, (two pianos) 1950
- L'enfant s'amuse, (piano) 1954
- Carillon, (harp) 1955
- Carillon, (organ) 1955
- Sonatine Champetre, (for piano) 1959
- Sonata (two pianos) 1960
- String Quartet, 1964
- Jazz and Blues, (piano) 1970
- Piano Trio, (piano, violin & cello) 1973–4
- Clarinet Quintet, (clarinet & string quartet) 1977
- Boutades Bourguignonnes, (piano) 1984
- String Sextet, (2 violins, 2 violas, 2 cellos) 1985
- Trois Chiffres, (piano) 1994
- Carillon "Joyeux Noel" (harp) 1994
- Septain (piano) 1995
