= David Lloyd-Jones (conductor) =

British conductor (1934–2022)

David Matthias Lloyd-Jones (19 November 1934 – 8 June 2022) was a British conductor who specialised in British and Russian music. In 1978 he was a co-founder of Opera North, conducting 50 productions during the 12 years he was there, and was also an editor and translator, especially of Russian operas.

== Early career and Sadlers Wells ==
Lloyd-Jones was born in London, the son of Sir Harry Vincent Lloyd-Jones and wife Margaret Alwena Mathias. Before World War II, his family was evacuated and moved to West Wales to live on a farm. There he had no contact with classical music until the age of nine, when he studied Mozart in school. On his 10th birthday, his father took him to his first orchestral concert, at the Royal Albert Hall, with the London Philharmonic Orchestra. He quickly developed a love of British music, including Ralph Vaughan Williams, and also of Russian music. He later attended Magdalen College, Oxford where in 1958 he gained a degree in German and Russian. A contemporary there was Dudley Moore, who played as leader of the college orchestra under Lloyd-Jones's baton.

Lloyd-Jones began his professional career in 1959 as a répétiteur at the Royal Opera House, Covent Garden. He made his professional conducting debut in 1961 with the Royal Liverpool Philharmonic Orchestra. He conducted the New Opera Company from 1961 to 1964. He continued to build his reputation as a freelance conductor for orchestral and choral concerts. He also conducted for BBC broadcasts and TV studio opera productions.

In 1972 he was appointed assistant music director at Sadlers Wells Opera (now English National Opera), where he conducted a wide repertory which included the first British staging of War and Peace by Sergei Prokofiev.

== Opera North ==
Lloyd-Jones founded and became the first music director of Opera North in 1978, forming its orchestra, the English Northern Philharmonia (now the Orchestra of Opera North), of which he became artistic director. Over the course of twelve seasons, he conducted over fifty productions in Leeds and other Northern England venues. Highlights of his career at Opera North included the first British performance of Krenek's Jonny spielt auf and the British stage premiere of Richard Strauss's Daphne. Other notable Opera North productions which he conducted included Delius's A Village Romeo and Juliet, Borodin's Prince Igor, Wagner's Die Meistersinger von Nürnberg, Berlioz's Les Troyens, Richard Jones's staging of The Love for Three Oranges, a double-bill coupling (as at their first performances) of Tchaikovsky's Iolanta and The Nutcracker – the latter choreographed by Matthew Bourne of Adventures in Motion Pictures – and the world premiere of Wilfred Josephs's Rebecca.

He also conducted orchestral concerts for Opera North, including at festivals in France and Germany. He stepped down from the position of music director in 1990.

== Other activities ==
Lloyd-Jones conducted at the Royal Opera House, Welsh National Opera and Scottish Opera and at the Wexford, Cheltenham, Edinburgh and Leeds Festivals. He was Music Director of the Bradford Festival Choral Society. He also appeared in major cities throughout Europe, Scandinavia, Russia, Israel, Japan, Australia and the Americas.

In the recording studio, Lloyd-Jones specialised in British and Russian music, often for Hyperion and Naxos. He conducted the first commercial recordings of Constant Lambert's Summer's Last Will and Testament, released in 1992, and Tiresias in 1999. There are many other notable recordings, including ballet scores such as Vaughan Williams's Job and Arthur Bliss's Checkmate, and symphonic cycles by William Alwyn, Arnold Bax and Alan Rawsthorne.

As an editor, he produced a revised edition and translation of Mussorgsky's Boris Godunov, published by Oxford University Press in 1969. There was also an English translation for Tchaikovsky’s Eugene Onegin (1972), still in use today. He was editor-in-chief for OUP's edition of William Walton's orchestral works, and he also edited Vaughan Williams's opera Sir John in Love. Later projects included the 1984 Ernst Eulenburg (London) miniature full score—in its critical edition—of Gilbert and Sullivan's The Gondoliers. In June 2009, Lloyd-Jones conducted a professional recording of Arthur Sullivan's grand opera Ivanhoe for Chandos, which was released in 2010 and was nominated for a Grammy Award.

In 1986 Lloyd-Jones was granted an honorary Doctor of Music of the University of Leeds, and in 2007 he was awarded honorary membership of the Royal Philharmonic Society, where he was a member of the Council.

== Family ==
He married Carol (Carolyn) Whitehead in 1964, and there were two sons (Gareth and Simon) and a daughter (Vanessa). They lived at a flat in Chelsea and a cottage in Petworth, West Sussex. His wife died in 2016. He died in June 2022, aged 87. He was the nephew of the well-known British preacher Martyn Lloyd-Jones.

Cultural offices
| Preceded by none | Music Director, Opera North; 1977–1990 | Succeeded by Paul Daniel |
