= Denis ApIvor =

British composer

Denis ApIvor (14 April 1916 – 27 May 2004) was a British composer, best known for his ballet score Blood Wedding. He had a parallel career as a consultant anaesthetist.

== Biography ==
ApIvor (pronounced Ap Ivor) was born in Collinstown, County Westmeath, Ireland, to Welsh parents. He attended Hereford Cathedral School and was a chorister at Christ Church, Oxford, and Hereford Cathedral. Because his parents opposed a career in music, he studied medicine in London, but had also pursued the study of music from an early age. He began his medical studies at the University of Aberystwyth in 1933, moving the next year to University College London. Inspired by hearing the first performance in England of Wozzeck (at the Queen's Hall, 14 March 1934 conducted by Adrian Boult) and encouraged by Cecil Gray, ApIvor also studied composition privately with Patrick Hadley and Alan Rawsthorne.

At the outbreak of World War II he was for a time house physician at the Hospital of St John and St Elizabeth, Hampstead. In 1942 he was called up, mostly serving as a war doctor in India. After the war ApIvor continued with his medical career, eventually retiring in 1979 from the Mid Kent Group.

But he also returned to his musical activities. He formed a friendship with his Albany Street neighbour Constant Lambert, who conducted the premiere of his first major work, a choral-orchestral setting of T S Eliot's The Hollow Men, on 21 February, 1950. His diverse musical influences during this period ranged from Busoni, Delius, Peter Warlock and Bernard van Dieren to Berg and Webern.

The 1950s and 1960s were his most productive years, but despite a decline in performances from the 1970s he continued to compose into the 1990s and beyond. He left London to live in Wales in 1987 and in the 1990s moving to Telscombe, near Brighton. He died in Robertsbridge, Sussex, aged 88.

== Music ==
ApIvor's music falls broadly into three periods: early works from the 1950s influenced by Van Dieren and Peter Warlock, soon leading to a stricter serial style until the late 1980s, and finally renewed simplicity in his later works.

His most successful early works include The Hollow Men (1939; rev. 1946), and several ballets. A Mirror for Witches (1951), based on the book by Esther Forbes with choreography by Andrée Howard and set designs by Norman Adams, was premiered on 4 March 1952 with the Sadler's Wells Ballet at the Royal Opera House. It was followed in 1953 by Blood Wedding, choreographed by Alfred Rodrigues, designs by Isabel Lambert. This Lorca-inspired work achieved international success, with staged productions from Turkey to Chile. It led to the commissioning by Sadler's Wells of the opera Yerma (1955–59). When this was shelved as being too difficult, William Glock asked Eugene Goossens to conduct the BBC Symphony Orchestra and chorus in a broadcast concert performance in 1961. Glock also commissioned the televised ballet Corporal Jan in 1968.

While ApIvor introduced serial elements in his Piano Concerto (1948, revised 1954 and performed at the Proms in 1958 by Patrick Piggott), it was only in 1955 that he began regularly using a more freely atonal and athematic serialism, which he continued to do until the 1980s. He was influenced in this by Edward Clark, a conductor, former BBC music producer, student of Arnold Schoenberg and husband of Elisabeth Lutyens.

He composed five symphonies, various concertos (for cello, guitar, horn, piano and violin), and many chamber and instrumental works, including three string quartets. He made a major contribution to the guitar repertoire: solo works include Variations (1958), Discanti (1970), Saeta (1972), and ten serial pieces included with his book Serial Composition for Guitarists (1982). He also wrote a Concertino for guitar (1954), Liaison for guitar and keyboard (1976), and Cinquefoil for flute, guitar, and viola (1984).

Composer David Hackbridge Johnson has noted "a less aphoristic approach to serialism" in later works, with the expressive and melodic qualities of the Cello Concerto (1977) foreshadowing the modal works of his final years, such as the String Quartet No 3 (1989–90). His Fantasy Concertante (1979–80) for horn was broadcast by soloist Frank Lloyd with the BBC Scottish Symphony Orchestra, conducted by Nicholas Kraemer in 1996. His final work was an operatic scena The Trixter (2002), setting a poem by Peter Warlock. Archival material relating to ApIvor can be accessed at the National Library of Wales and a full set of his scores are held at The University of Leeds.

== List of works ==
=== Opera ===
- She Stoops to Conquer, opera after Goldsmith (1943–47; rev. 1976–77)
- Yerma, opera after Lorca (1955–58)
- Ubu roi, opera after Jarry (1965–66)
- Bouvard and Pécuchet, opera after Flaubert (1970)

=== Ballet ===
- The Goodman of Paris (1951)
- A Mirror for Witches (1951)
- Blood Wedding (1953)
- Veneziana (1953)
- Saudades (1954)
- Corporal Jan (1967)
- Glide the Dark Door Wide (1977)

=== Orchestral ===
- Nocturne for Strings (1938)
- Symphony No 1 (1952)
- Guitar Concertino (1953)
- Piano Concerto (1948; rev. 1954)
- Violin Concerto No 1 (1950)
- Overtones, after Paul Klee's paintings (1961–62)
- Symphony No 2 (1963)
- Triple Concerto for string trio and string orchestra (1967)
- Tarot for chamber orchestra (1968)
- Neumes, variations (1969)
- El Silencio Ondulado for guitar and chamber orchestra (1972)
- Violin Concerto No 2 (1975)
- Cello Concerto (1976–77)
- Symphony No 3 (1978–79)
- Fantasy Concertante for horn and orchestra (1980)
- Symphony No 4 (1989)
- Symphony No 5 (1991)

=== Chamber ===
- Violin Sonata (1944–45)
- Concertante for clarinet, piano and percussion (1944–45) (later version with strings, harp and celesta)
- Wind Quintet (1960)
- Mutations for cello and piano (1962)
- String Quartet No 1 (1964)
- Crystals for percussion, Hammond organ, guitar and double bass (1964–65)
- Harp, Piano, Piano-Harp (1966)
- Ten-String Design for violin and guitar (1968)
- Exotics Theatre for Chamber Ensemble (1972)
- Psycho-pieces for clarinet and piano (1973)
- Clarinet Quintet (1975)
- String Quartet No 2 (1976)
- Chant Eolien for oboe and piano (1977)
- Duo Concertante for horn and piano (1981)
- Vista for double wind quintet (1983)
- Cinquefoil, trio for violin, flute, and guitar (1984)
- String Quartet No 3 (1989–90)
- Pieces of Five for saxophone (1992)
- Saxophone Sonatina (1992)
- Violin Sonatina (1992)
- In the Landscape of Spring, septet (1993)

=== Vocal ===
- The Hollow Men, cantata after T. S. Eliot (1939, rev. 1946))
- Six Songs of García Lorca for voice and piano or guitar (1945–46)
- Estella Marina for chorus and strings or organ (1946)
- Thamar and Amnon for soloists, chorus and orchestra, after Lorca (1953–54)
- Cantata, after Dylan Thomas (1960)
- Chorales for chorus and orchestra after Hugh Manning (1964–65)
- Resonance of the Southern Flora for chorus, organ and orchestra, after Paul Klee (1972)
- Fern Hill for tenor and 11 instruments, after Dylan Thomas (1973
- Bats for tenor, piccolo, violin, and percussion (1979)
- Seven Songs for chorus and small orchestra (1983)
- Love’s Season for voice and string quintet or piano (1983)
- Majestatas Dei Ultra Stellas for chorus and small orchestra or piano (1986)
- T. S. Eliot Songs for voice and piano (1994)
- Lady of Silences for small chorus and chamber orchestra, after T. S. Eliot (1994)
- Canzona Delle Lettere Amorose for soprano, baritone, alto saxophone and bass guitar (1994)
- Give me your flowers, O Spring for tenor and two guitars (1996)
- Lamentaciones for voice and piano, after Lorca (1996)
