= Gordon Jacob =

English composer (1895–1984)

Gordon Jacob CBE
- Born: Gordon Percival Septimus Jacob; 5 July 1895; London, England
- Died: 8 June 1984 (aged 88); Saffron Walden, England
- Education: Royal College of Music
- Occupations: Composer; pianist; academic teacher
- Organizations: Royal College of Music

Gordon Percival Septimus Jacob CBE (5 July 1895 – 8 June 1984) was an English composer and teacher. He was a professor at the Royal College of Music in London from 1924 until his retirement in 1966, and published four books and many articles about music. As a composer he was prolific: the list of his works totals more than 700, mostly compositions of his own, but a substantial minority of orchestrations and arrangements of other composers' works. Those music he orchestrated range from William Byrd to Edward Elgar to Noël Coward.

== Life and career ==
Jacob was born in Upper Norwood, London, the seventh son and youngest of ten children of Stephen Jacob, and his wife, Clara Laura, daughter of Gordon Forlong. Stephen Jacob, an official of the Indian Civil Service based in Calcutta, died when Gordon was three. One of his older brothers was Archibald Jacob, choral composer, arranger and author of Musical Handwriting (OUP, 1937).

Jacob was educated at Dulwich College, and enlisted in the Queen's Royal Regiment (West Surrey) at the outbreak of the First World War. He was taken POW in 1917 after being one of 60 survivors from a battalion of 800. In the prison camp he studied a harmony textbook in the camp library and began composing. He wrote for an orchestra of his fellow prisoners, with assorted instruments. After the war he studied journalism before turning to music. He took a correspondence course, gained an ARCM diploma and was accepted as a full-time student at the Royal College of Music (RCM) in 1920. There, he was a pupil of Charles Villiers Stanford and Ralph Vaughan Williams (composition), Herbert Howells (music theory) and Adrian Boult (conducting), from whom he learned the "economy and decision" of his podium technique.

At the end of his student course in 1924, Gordon became a teacher of music, briefly at Birkbeck and Morley Colleges, and then at the RCM, where he remained until his retirement in 1966. He was professor of music theory, composition and orchestration. Among his students at the RCM were Malcolm Arnold, Ruth Gipps, Imogen Holst, Cyril Smith, Philip Cannon, Pamela Harrison, Joseph Horovitz, Bernard Stevens and John Warrack.

In addition to his teaching commitments he was a regular examiner for the Associated Board of the Royal Schools of Music, and from 1947 to 1957 he was editor of Penguin Musical Scores. He contributed articles to musical journals and to Grove's Dictionary of Music and Musicians and wrote four books: Orchestral Technique, a Manual for Students (1931); How to Read a Score (1944); The Composer and his Art (1955); and The Elements of Orchestration (1962).

In 1959 a BBC television documentary about Jacob was directed by Ken Russell; in the following years, under its controller of music William Glock, the BBC was seen as increasingly hostile to living composers who wrote tonal music. It was always denied that Glock had a blacklist, but music by non avant-garde composers, including Edmund Rubbra, Arnold Bax, John Ireland and even William Walton, was demonstrably out of favour with the BBC during the 1960s. By this decade a large proportion of a composer's income came from royalties for broadcasts, and like others of his generation, Jacob suffered from the BBC's disinclination to play his music. He was fortunate in having a steady stream of commissions from the US, where his music was popular with university wind bands. He never retired from composing, and went on writing until shortly before his death.

Jacob was twice married, first in 1924 to Sydney Gray, elder daughter of the Rev Arthur Gray of Ipswich. She died in 1958, and the following year he married Margaret Sidney Hannah Gray, the niece of his first wife. There were a son and daughter of the second marriage.

Jacob died at his home in Saffron Walden, Essex, in 1984, aged 88.

=== Awards and honours ===
While a student at the RCM Jacob won the Arthur Sullivan composition prize. He was awarded a doctorate (DMus) by the University of London in 1935, and the John Collard Fellowship by the Worshipful Company of Musicians in 1943. He was elected as a Fellow of the Royal College of Music in 1946, and was made an honorary Fellow of the Royal Academy of Music the following year. In 1968 he was appointed CBE.

== Music ==
=== Compositions ===
Jacob was a prolific composer. Grove lists 16 concertos by him for a wide variety of solo instruments, including trombone and timpani. A website dedicated to Jacob lists more than 700 original compositions or arrangements of existing music. His biographer (and former pupil) Eric Wetherell writes that as a composer, Jacob was influenced more by early 20th-century French and Russian examples rather than the German tradition. Wetherell writes of Jacob's "clarity of structure and instrumental writing that shows a keen awareness of the capabilities and limitations of every instrument". Reviewing a concert of his music given in 1939, The Times said, "As a general description, 'Good, but a little dry' might be justly applied to Jacob's work".

In the 1920s and 1930s Jacob composed music for choral societies and school choirs, which provided a steady income, in between more ambitious compositions. From his works of the 1920s, Wetherell singles out a viola concerto (1926), a piano concerto followed (1927) and the First Symphony (1929) dedicated to the memory of Jacob's favourite brother who was killed in the First World War. Large-scale works from the 1930s include an oboe concerto for Léon Goossens (1935) and Variations on an Original Theme (1937)

In the 1930s Jacob, along with several other young composers, wrote for the Sadler's Wells Ballet Company (now The Royal Ballet). His one original ballet (other than a student work, The Jew in the Bush (1928)), was Uncle Remus (1934), written for them. During the Second World War, Jacob wrote music for several propaganda films, and after the war he provided the score for the feature film Esther Waters (1948). A more personal take on the war is evident in the austere Symphony for Strings (1943), written for the Boyd Neel Orchestra.

Jacob's Second Symphony, premiered on 1 May 1946 at a BBC studio recording, was considered by one reviewer to be "perhaps the most stimulating work that has yet come from this composer". The reviewer remarked on the work's intensity of feeling, ranging from romantic excitement in the first movement, through poignancy and fury in the two middle movements to a mood of heroism in the final passacaglia. Four new works appeared in 1951, the year of the Festival of Britain: Music for a Festival (for brass and military bands), concertos for flute and for horn, and the cantata A Goodly Heritage.

Among the original compositions from Jacob's later years was incidental music to a dramatised adaptation of the biblical Book of Job, first performed at the Festival of the Arts, Saffron Walden, and later broadcast by the BBC.

=== Arrangements ===
Jacob's first major success was written during his student years: the William Byrd Suite for orchestra based on the Fitzwilliam Virginal Book. Boult conducted the first performance in February 1923. The Times called it "a brilliant piece of adaptation", and expressed the hope that it would be heard again. The music critic for The Times commented in 1932 that there was "something magical" about the way in which Jacob's arrangements transformed the original music into scores that might make the listener think that the new version was what the composer really intended.

Most of Jacob's ballet scores were arrangements of existing works, such as Les Sylphides (1932, using music by Chopin), Carnival (1932, Schumann), Apparitions (1936, Liszt), and Mam'zelle Angot, (1947, Lecocq). In 1958 Noël Coward composed a one-act work London Morning for the London Festival Ballet, which Jacob orchestrated. In 1968, Jacob re-orchestrated the score of Frederick Ashton's ballet Marguerite and Armand, replacing a previous orchestration by Humphrey Searle of music by Liszt.

During the Second World War Jacob was one of several composers who contributed arrangements of popular tunes to the BBC comedy show ITMA. Shortly after the war, on Boult's recommendation, Jacob was commissioned by a music publishing firm to orchestrate Elgar's Organ Sonata (1946). After a single performance in 1947 this version remained unplayed until 1988, when the Royal Liverpool Philharmonic Orchestra conducted by Vernon Handley recorded it for CD. Reviewing the recording, Edward Greenfield commented that dubbing the orchestrated version "Elgar's Symphony No. 0" was amply justified.

Jacob's trumpet-heavy fanfare arrangement of the national anthem was used for the coronation of Queen Elizabeth II in 1953, in 2022 for her funeral, and again in 2023 for the coronation of Charles III and Camilla. It was also used in Norway in 2016 for the 25th anniversary of King Harald V's accession in 1991, as the nation's royal anthem shares the same melody as the national anthem of the United Kingdom.

=== Recordings ===
The discography at the Gordon Jacob website lists more than eighty recordings of his works, some of them arrangements of other composers' music, such as the Elgar Organ Sonata and Vaughan Williams's English Folk Song Suite, but mostly original works by Jacob. They include: orchestral pieces such as the First and Second Symphonies, the Little Symphony and The Barber of Seville Goes to the Devil; the two Viola Concertos as well as concertante works for bassoon, clarinet, flute, horn, piano (two concertos), oboe, trombone and trumpet; and chamber works for many different combinations of instruments.

== Partial list of works ==
- William Byrd Suite (composed 1922, published 1924)
- Concerto for Viola and Orchestra (1925)
- Concerto for Piano and Strings (1927)
- An Original Suite for Military Band (1928)
- String Quartet No. 1 (1928)
- Symphony No. 1 (1928–9)
- Denbigh Suite for String Orchestra (or String Quartet) (1929), for Howell's School, Denbigh
- Variations on an Air by Purcell (1930), string orchestra
- Passacaglia on a Well-Known Theme (Oranges and Lemons) (1931)
- String Quartet No. 2 (1931)
- Concerto for Oboe and Strings (1933)
- Uncle Remus (1934), ballet
- Variations on an Original Theme (1936);
- Suite No. 1 in F (1939)
- Clarinet Quintet (1940)
- Symphony for Strings (1943)
- Symphony No. 2 (1945)
- Sonatina for clarinet (or viola) and piano (1946)
- Concerto for Bassoon, Strings, and Percussion (1947)
- Suite No. 2 (1948–9);
- Suite No. 3 (1949)
- Fantasia on the Alleluia Hymn (1949)
- Serenade (1950), woodwind octet
- The Nun's Priest's Tale (1951), chorus and orchestra
- Music for a Festival (1951), concert band
- Concerto for Horn and Strings (1951)
- Concerto for Flute and Strings (1952)
- Scherzo for Two Trumpets, Horn, and Trombone (1952)
- Sextet for piano and winds, "In memoriam Aubrey Brain"
- Concerto for Violin and Strings (1954)
- Concerto for Cello and Strings (1955)
- Prelude and Toccata (1955), orchestra
- Concerto for Trombone and Orchestra (1955)
- Piano Trio (1956)
- Divertimento for harmonica and string quartet (1956)
- Oboe Concerto No. 2 (1956)
- Piano Concerto No. 2 (1957)
- Five Pieces (In the form of a Suite) for Harmonica and Piano (1957)
- Old Wine in New Bottles (1958), For wind ensemble: 2 flutes, 2 oboes, 2 clarinets, 2 bassoons, 2 horns, 2 trumpets
- Prelude, Meditation and Fanfare (1958), organ
- The Pied Piper, 2 unaccompanied pieces for solo flute/piccolo: The Spell (solo flute) and March to the River Weser (solo piccolo) (1958)
- Overture Fun Fare (1960)
- The Barber of Seville Goes to the Devil (1960), full orchestra (burlesque of Rossini's overture to The Barber of Seville)
- Overture for Strings (1964)
- Divertimento (1968), 8 winds
- Suite for Bassoon and String Quartet (1968) for William Waterhouse
- Suite for Four Trombones (1968)
- Concerto for Piano Duet (3 hands) and Orchestra (1969)
- York Symphony (1970), for brass band
- Concerto for Band (1970), concert band
- Partita for Bassoon (1970) for William Waterhouse
- Introduction and Rondo (1972), clarinet choir
- Suite for Tuba and Strings (1972)
- Variations on a Dorian Theme (1972)
- Five Pieces for Clarinet (Unaccompanied) (1973)
- Swansea Town, variations for wind ensemble (1973)
- Fantasia for Euphonium and Wind Band (1974)
- Double Concerto for Clarinet and Trumpet (1975)
- Suite for 8 violas (1975), premiered in 1976, in honor of Lionel Tertis' 100th birthday.
- Pro Corda Suite (1977), string quartet and string orchestra
- Concertino for Trombone and Wind Orchestra (1977)
- Symphony AD 78 (1978), concert band
- Fantasia on an English folk song (Dashing away with a smoothing iron) (published c. 1984), concert band
- Sonata for Viola and Piano (1978)
- Cameos for bass trombone (1978)
- Sonata for trombone and piano (1979)
- Viola Concerto No. 2 (1979) ()
- Mini-Concerto for Clarinet and String Orchestra (1980), dedicated to and first performed by Thea King.
- Fanfare, Pavan and Fughetta for alto, tenor and bass trombones (1980)
- Trombone Octet (1981)
- Cello Serenade (published 1984) commissioned by Ross Pople, funded by the Eastern Arts Association
- Concerto for Timpani and Wind Band (1984)
- Clarinet Concertino (arranged from two violin sonatas of Giuseppe Tartini)
- Two Madrigals for Trombone Choir (manuscript)

=== Books ===
- Orchestral Technique (1931)
- How to Read a Score (1944)
- The Composer and his Art (1955)
- The Elements of Orchestration (1962)

== See also ==
- Gordon Jacob, a 1959 short British biopic film about Gordon Jacob by Ken Russell

== References and sources ==
=== Sources ===
- Kennedy, Michael (1989). Portrait of Walton. Oxford: OUP. ISBN 978-0-90-521084-1.
- Wetherell, Eric (1995). Gordon Jacob: A Centenary Biography. London: Thames Publishing. ISBN 978-0-19-816705-1.
