= Orchestra of Opera North =

The Orchestra of Opera North (or English Northern Philharmonia as recording name) is the orchestra that plays for the Opera North.

It was founded as the English Northern Philharmonia, and changed its name during the period when Steven Sloane was Opera North's Music Director. Since the Royal Scottish National Orchestra ceased to play for Scottish Opera, the OON is the only orchestra in Britain which performs throughout the year in concert halls as well as opera houses.

The orchestra made a number of recordings for Naxos Records under former Opera North Music Directors Paul Daniel and David Lloyd-Jones.
