= Adam Zero =

Ballet

- Choreographer: Robert Helpmann
- Music: Arthur Bliss
- Premiere: 8 April 1946; Royal Opera House, Covent Garden, London
- Original ballet company: The Sadler’s Wells Ballet
- Characters: The Stage Director; The Choreographer (‘Creator and Destroyer’ The Principal Dancer ‘Adam Zero’ The Designer, Wardrobe Mistress, Dresser (‘His fates’); The Ballerina (‘His first love, wife and mistress’); The Understudies (‘His son and daughter’); The Character Dancers (‘His cat and dog’); The Mime (‘His spiritual adviser’)
- Genre: Neoclassical ballet

Adam Zero is a ballet with music composed by Arthur Bliss and choreographed by Robert Helpmann in 1946.

== Background ==
After World War I, Bliss developed an interest in ballet after seeing the Ballets Russes of Sergei Diaghilev in London. Bliss composed Adam Zero for the Sadler's Wells Ballet, in collaboration with Michael Benthall and Robert Helpmann, with whom he had seen success with Miracle in the Gorbals. The first performance at the Royal Opera House, Covent Garden in London on 6 April 1946 was conducted by Constant Lambert. The premiere dancers included the following:

- David Paltenghi (The Stage Director)
- June Brae (The Choreographer / The Ballerina)
- Robert Helpmann (Adam Zero)
- Jean Bedells (The Designer)
- Julia Farron (The Wardrobe Mistress)
- Gillian Lynne (The Daughter)
- Palma Nye (The Dresser)
- Leslie Edwards (The Mime)
- Gordon Hamilton (The Dog)

Bliss considered Adam Zero his "most varied and exciting ballet score; the music is instinctively theatrical and strongly characterized." The orchestra is augmented by cor anglais, saxophone, tuba, two standard percussionists and two dance band percussionists, plus celesta and harp.

It was revived as a ballet with choreography by Sergei Vanaev and conducted by Marc Niemann at the Stadttheater Bremerhaven in 2016.

== Sections ==
- Fanfare Overture: Allegro Molto
- The Stage: Andante sostenuto
- Birth of Adam: Molto sostenuto
- Adam’s Fates: Allegro moderato
- Dance of Spring: Allegro spirito
- Awakening of Love: Andante grazioso
- Bridal Ceremony: Moderato ma tranquillo
- Adam Achieves Power: Allegro spiritoso
- Re-entry of Adam’s Fates: Allegro moderato
- Dance of Summer: Allegro maestoso
- Approach of Autumn: Larghetto
- Night Club Scene: Moderato
- Destruction of Adam’s World: Allegro molto
- Approach of Winter: Andantino
- Dance with Death: Largo maestoso
- Finale – the stage is reset for the next life-cycle: Allegro moderato

The complete ballet runs for around 40 minutes.

== Synopsis ==
The ballet is an allegory of the cycle of man’s life; the world in which he lives is represented by a stage on which a ballet is being created: Adam is cast as the principal dancer, Omnipotence is represented by the Stage Director and Adam’s Fates by the Designer, Wardrobe Mistress and Dresser.

Adam falls in love, marries, and achieves power, but his triumph is brief; his world crumbles about him, he is stripped of his glory, and a new generation (Understudy) takes his place. He seeks distraction in dissipation but everyone deserts him and he is left alone to face Death.

== Arrangement ==
In 1970 Bliss made an adaption of music from the Night Club Scene for two pianos, three hands (for Phyllis Sellick and Cyril Smith) as Fun and Games. Sellick and Smith first performed the work on 9 December 1970 at Morley College.

== Recordings ==
- Naxos 8.553460: English Northern Philharmonia; David Lloyd-Jones, conductor (complete ballet). 1995.
