= June Brae =

British ballet dancer

June Brae (17 May 1917 – 3 January 2000) was a British ballet dancer, who created leading roles for Frederick Ashton, Ninette de Valois and other choreographers.

She was born June Bear on 17 May 1917 and brought up in Shanghai, where she studied alongside Margot Fonteyn under the Russian George Gontcharov. She returned to London to study under Nicholas Legat, staying with her mother at the Women's Residence Club in Barkston Gardens, Earls' Court. In 1933 she joined the school of the Vic-Wells Ballet and in 1935 progressed to the Company, directed by Ninette de Valois. Soon after, she changed her name from Bear to Brae after de Valois declared "I can't have performing bears in the Company."

Brae was soon taking leading roles, including the Rich Girl in Nocturne (1936), a skater in Les Patineurs (1937), Josephine in Wedding Bouquet (1937), the Black Queen in Checkmate (1937) and La Superbe in Harlequin in the Street (1938). She was the Lilac Fairy in the 1939 revival of The Sleeping Princess and Venus in Cupid and Psyche in the same year. After the start of the Second World War, she toured England extensively with the Sadler's Wells Ballet, and was with the company when it was caught in the Netherlands during the German invasion on 10 May 1940, escaping back to England in the hold of a freighter.

With Fonteyn and Pamela May, June was one of trio of exceptional performers and close friends who gained the nickname 'The Triptych'. She met David Bredon, whom she was to marry in 1942, at a party in Cambridge in 1938, at which Fonteyn and May also met their future husbands. After her marriage, she retired from dancing and had two children. In 1946 she returned to the stage, creating the role of The Choreographer in Robert Helpmann's Adam Zero. She then transferred to the Sadler's Wells Theatre Ballet (now Birmingham Royal Ballet), set up when the main Company moved to the Royal Opera House, Covent Garden, including the principal role in Andrée Howard's Assembly Ball. She retired soon after.

She died on 3 January 2000.
