= Michael Benthall =

English theatre director

- Born: Michael Pickersgill Benthall; 8 February 1919; London, England
- Died: 6 September 1974 (aged 55); London, England
- Occupation: Theatre director
- Partner: Robert Helpmann
- Relatives: Edward Charles Benthall (father); Ernest Cable, 1st Baron Cable (maternal grandfather)

Michael Pickersgill Benthall CBE (8 February 1919 – 6 September 1974) was an English theatre director.

== Background ==
Michael Benthall was born in Mayfair on 8 February 1919, the son of the British businessman and public servant Sir Edward Charles Benthall and Ruth, Lady Benthall (née Ruth McCarthy Cable), daughter of Ernest Cable, 1st Baron Cable. He attended Eton College and Christ Church, Oxford. He left Oxford in 1938 to begin an acting career. During World War II, he served with the Royal Artillery and was a major.

== Career ==
His first connection with the Old Vic was during the 1944 season when the company, owing to enemy action, had been forced to relocate to the New Theatre (now the Noël Coward Theatre) where Benthall directed a production of Hamlet jointly with Tyrone Guthrie.

Benthall provided the scenario for two ballets by Arthur Bliss: Miracle in the Gorbals (1944), and Adam Zero (1946). He was the artistic director of the Old Vic between 1953 and 1962, and produced all of the Shakespeare plays in the First Folio over five years.

A few years later, he directed I'm Solomon, a musical remake of an Israeli musical called King Solomon and Shalmai the Shoemaker ("Shlomo ha'Melech ve'Shalmai ha'Sandlar") that ran in Jaffa in the Summer of 1967. I'm Solomon starred Dick Shawn, Salome Jens and Carmen Mathews. Ernest Gold, who had written the score for the movie Exodus (1960), wrote the music. Geoffrey Holder choreographed the show. Benthall then directed Coco starring Katharine Hepburn with music by André Previn and lyrics by Alan Jay Lerner. Later came Her First Roman, a musical version of George Bernard Shaw's Caesar and Cleopatra.

== Personal life ==
As an undergraduate at Oxford, Benthall met Robert Helpmann, who had been fulfilling an invitation to dance there. The two men formed a romantic relationship that was to last for 36 years. The couple lived and worked together quite openly for the remainder of Benthall's life.

Benthall died from cirrhosis at the Royal Free Hospital in London on 6 September 1974, aged 55.
