= Antonio Salinas =

Mexican dancer, choreographer and stage actor

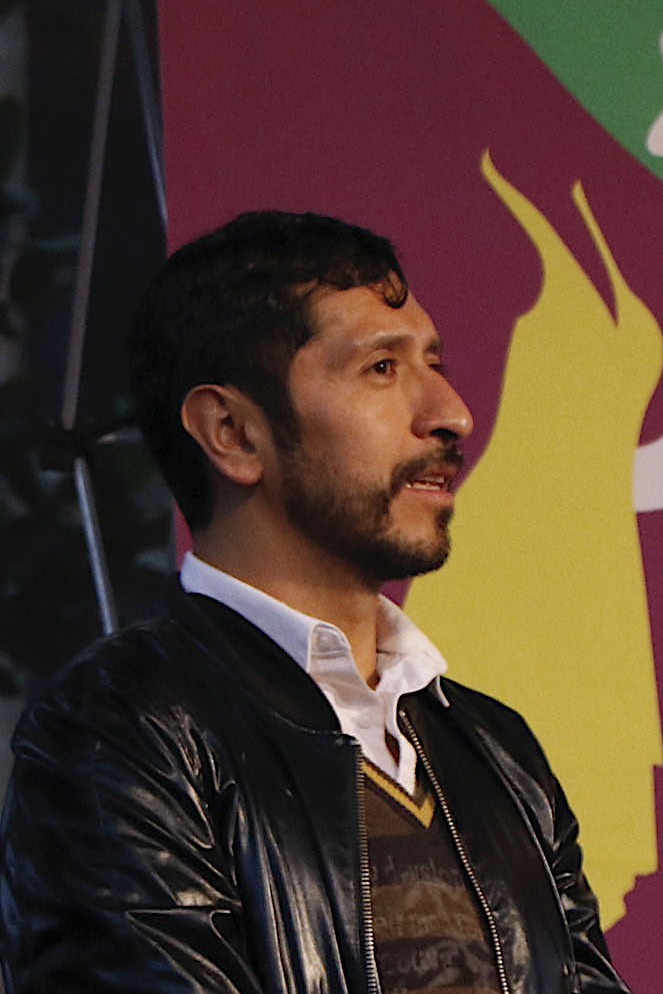
- Occupations: Dancer; choreographer; stage actor
- Years active: 1990s–present

Antonio Salinas is a Mexican dancer, choreographer and stage actor. He has studied and collaborated with Mexican and international artists and has taught in a number of universities at home and abroad. In 1999, he was named one of the best dancers in Mexico by Zona de Danza.

== Preparation ==
Salinas studied dance in Mexico and the United States, graduating the Escuela Nacional de Danza Clásica y Contemporánea de México, then studying at the Palucca School of Dance in Dresden, Germany and Movement Research in New York. He has also studied under movement, acting, voice and drama experts such as Iñaki Aspillaga, Mikel Schumacher, David Zambrano, Ori Foening, Nancy Stark Smith, Andrew Harwood, Lutz Foster, Dharly Thomas, Sondra Loring, Paul Backer, Maria Huesca, Gabrielle Staiger and Patricia Cardona.

== Career in the arts ==
He has collaborated as an actor, choreographer, dancer, interviewer, and playwright in various Mexican and international organizations. A series of one-person shows, authored by Salinas, have been presented in festivals across Latin America. He has choreographed events for the Festival Internacional Cervantino, for soloists at the National Dance Company of Mexico, the dance company of the Universidad de Xalapa, the Mexican Dance Academy, the Escuela Superior de Danza of Monterrey and for plays directed by Mauricio García Lozano and Luís de Tavira. He has worked with international directors such as Elena Fokina, Laura Arís and Germán Jáuregui. During the 2000s, he managed to appear on the marquees of most of Mexico's major theaters.

In 1999, he collaborated with Alicia Sánchez on the play Waiting for Godot and with Beckett on Filling Silence. Among his most important works are Las casualidades de Benjamín (1999), Lucas Lucan (2000), Aeropuerto, Toneladas de luz (2004) and a theatre piece called O44 55 Disección de corazones which stands out for its use of language along with dance, performance art and painting. This is one of Salinas' major theatrical successes, which was sponsored by INBA as part of a series on alternative theater. One recent work is La fiebre del oso polar (The fever of the polar bear), a hybrid work which is meant to have the audience thinking about how human intelligence affects the world around them. It also aims to show that humans share many characteristics with other living things, even spinach. It contains dance, song, theatre performance and video. The work was performed at the Festival Internacional Cervantino in 2011.

He has won awards such as the San Luís 2006 Award for best play, Best Dancer at the XXVI Lila López International Festival of Dance, Best Monologue Actor by AMCT in 2005, the 2005 Miguel Covarrubias Price of the University of Colima, Best Choreographer at the ISSSTE Young Choreographers Competition in 2002 and Best Dancer at the XIX INBA-UAM National Dance Prize. He was named one of the most important choreographers and one of the best dancers of Mexico by the Zona de Danza ballet studio and art center in 1999.

== Teaching career ==
As a teacher, he has worked at the Escuela Superior de Danza of Monterrey, the Centro Dramático in Michoacán and has been part of the faculty of the Casa del Teatro at the Palacio de Bellas Artes. He has also taught at the Universidad de los Andes in Venezuela, the National University of Colombia, the National School of Drama in New Delhi, the Universidad Autónoma de Chihuahua, Universidad de Colima and UNAM. Salinas has presented solo shows at prominent dance and theater festivals in various countries such as the United States, Spain, India and Brazil. He has done the choreography for the National Dance Company of Mexico, the National Theatre Company of Mexico and the National Opera Company of Mexico.
