= Edward Benthall =

English businessman and public servant

Sir Edward Charles Benthall, KCSI (26 November 1893 – 5 March 1961), also known as Tom Benthall, was a British businessman and public servant who spent the majority of his career in British India. He was described in an obituary in The Times as "perhaps the foremost figure in his day of the British mercantile community in India."

The son of the Rev. Charles Francis Benthall and Annie Theodosia Benthall, Edward Benthall was educated at Eton College, where he was a King's Scholar, and King's College, Cambridge. He joined the White Star Line at its Liverpool office in 1913, then went to India at the outbreak of the First World War, enlisting and serving in India in 1914–15 and Mesopotamia in 1916–18, where he was wounded. He was then transferred to the War Office staff, where he served in 1918–19.

In 1918, he married the Hon. Ruth McCarthy Cable, daughter of Ernest Cable, 1st Baron Cable, with whom he had a son, the theatre director Michael Benthall. He followed in the footsteps of his father-in-law, the chairman of the Calcutta trading firm Bird and Co., and joined the firm in India. He was a director of the Imperial Bank of India from 1926 to 1934, and was its governor from 1928 to 1930.
