= Phyllis Sellick =

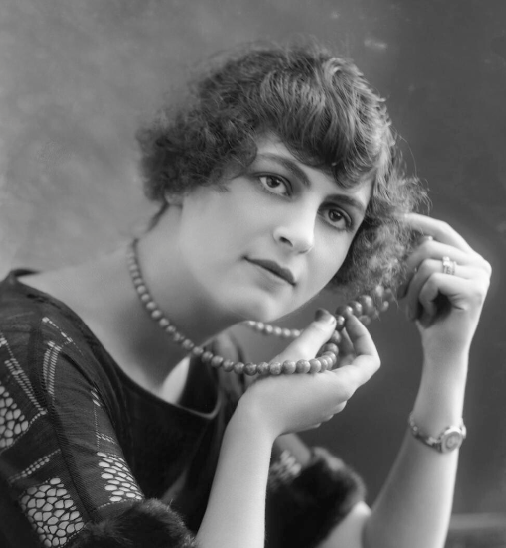

Background information
- Born: Phyllis Doreen Sellick; 16 June 1911; Ilford, Essex, England, UK
- Died: 26 May 2007 (aged 95) Kingston upon Thames, Surrey, England
- Genres: Romantic, 20th century
- Occupations: Virtuoso pianist, pedagogue
- Instruments: Piano
- Years active: 1929–2002

Phyllis Sellick, OBE (16 June 1911 – 26 May 2007) was a British pianist and teacher, best known for her partnership with her pianist husband Cyril Smith.

== Biography ==
Born at Ilford, Essex, Phyllis Sellick started to play the piano by ear at the age of three and had her first music lesson on her fifth birthday. Four years later she won the Daily Mirror's "Pip, Squeak and Wilfred" contest for young musicians and was awarded two years' private tuition with Cuthbert Whitemore, subsequently winning an open scholarship to continue her study with him at the Royal Academy of Music. She later studied with Isidor Philipp in Paris. She specialised in French and English music.

She first met Cyril Smith at a concert in the Queen's Hall, London. They married in 1937 and had two children, a son, Graham, who predeceased his mother, and a daughter, Claire.

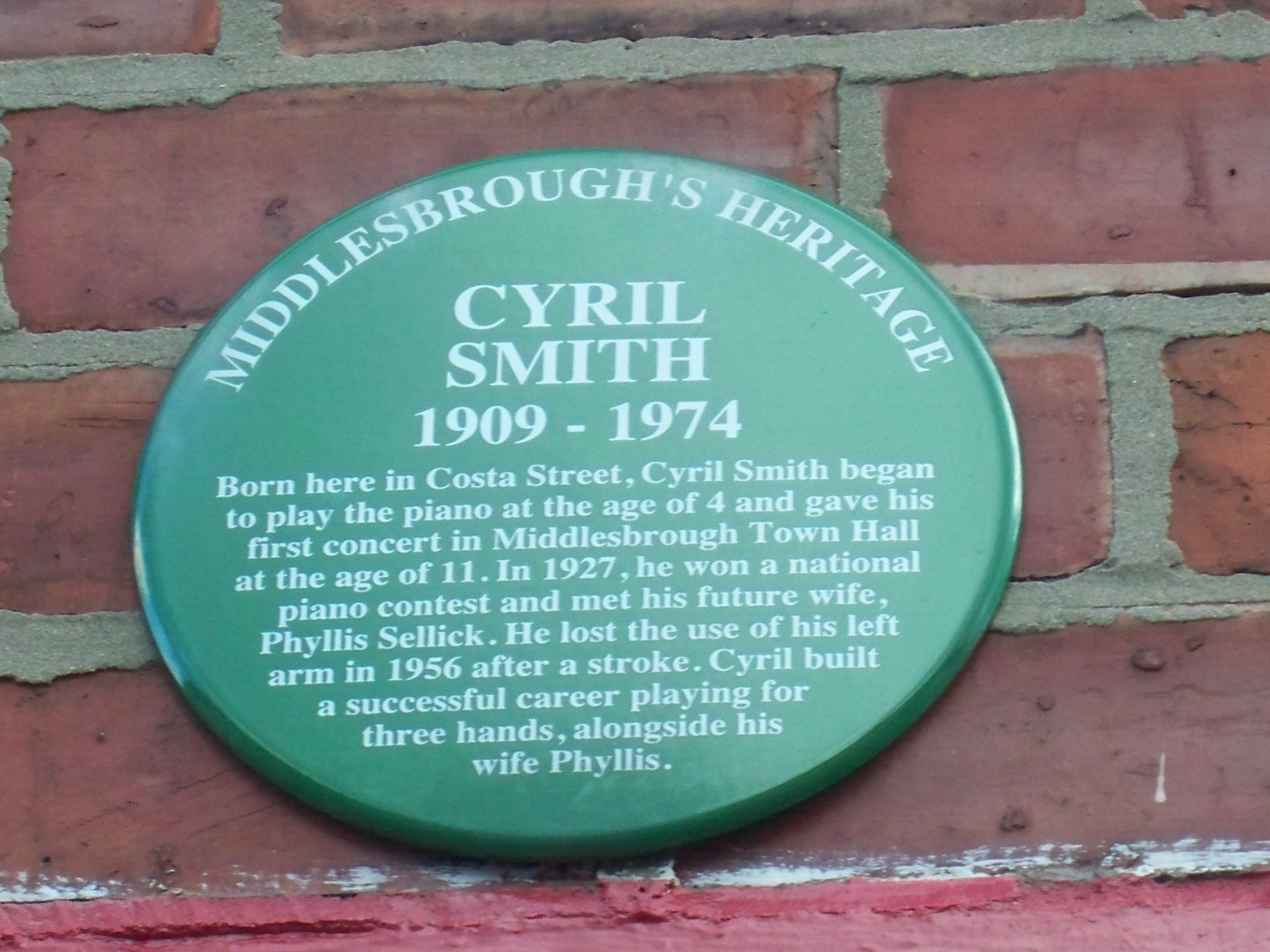
She is mentioned on Cyril's plaque

She and her husband performed together at The Proms in 1941, making many international tours and recordings as a duo. Composers such as Ralph Vaughan Williams (Introduction and Fugue 'For Phyllis and Cyril') and Lennox Berkeley (Concerto for Two Pianos, premiered at the Albert Hall in December 1948) wrote music specially for them.

Their career continued even after Smith lost the use of his left hand following two strokes, when the couple would play specially devised material for three hands, including a concerto written for them in 1969 by Malcolm Arnold (Concerto for Piano 3 Hands and Orchestra, Op. 104, sometimes known as Concerto for Phyllis and Cyril). Arthur Bliss arranged music from the Night Club Scene of his ballet Adam Zero for two pianos, three hands as Fun and Games. Sellick and Smith gave its first performance on 9 December 1970 at Morley College.

She and Smith were awarded OBEs in 1971. After Smith's death in 1974, Sellick continued a long and successful career as a teacher at the Royal College of Music, where her husband had taught. She continued to work into her 90s, despite her failing eyesight and loss of her playing ability in her left hand following an accident.

In 2002 she appeared on the BBC radio programme Desert Island Discs. One of her choices was Sergei Rachmaninoff's Rhapsody on a Theme of Paganini to which she added "I would like Cyril to play it".

Phyllis Sellick continued to work into her 10th decade. She died at age 95 in 2007 and was survived by her daughter, Claire Sellick, a photographer.
