= Les Patineurs (ballet) =

Ballet composed by Giacomo Meyerbeer

Les Patineurs (The Skaters) is a ballet choreographed by Frederick Ashton to music composed by Giacomo Meyerbeer and arranged by Constant Lambert. With scenery and costumes designed by William Chappell, it was first presented by the Vic-Wells Ballet at the Sadler's Wells Theatre, London, on 16 February 1937. It has been called "a paradigm of an Ashton ballet, perfectly crafted with a complex structure beneath the effervescent surface."

== Synopsis ==
The ballet, in one act, depicts a Victorian skating party that takes place on a frozen pond on a winter's evening. A semicircle of arched trellises painted white separates the pond from the snowy woods behind. Suspended above are colourful Chinese lanterns, shedding light on the white canvas stage covering, simulating ice, and dimly illuminating the dark trees silhouetted against the starry night sky. The first skaters to enter are four couples dressed in matching brown jackets. They are soon joined by others: two girls wearing blue jackets and bonnets, two girls wearing red jackets and bonnets, a girl and boy dressed all in white, and a lone boy wearing blue. This happy group of young people dance together in various combinations, gliding and leaping and spinning across the ice until snow begins to fall and the single boy is finally left alone, whirling like a top in the middle of the pond.

== Original cast ==
With a cast of only fifteen, Les Patineurs is a ballet in divertissement form rather than a story ballet: the dances simply proceed in sequence from beginning to end, with no narrative development. At the premiere, the principal dancers, the White Couple, were Margot Fonteyn and Robert Helpmann. The Blue Girls were Mary Honer and Elizabeth Miller; the Red Girls were June Brae and Pamela May; and Harold Turner was the Blue Boy, the virtuoso soloist in the group. The Brown Girls were Gwenyth Matthews, Joy Newton, Peggy Mellus, and Wenda Horsburgh, who were partnered by Richard Ellis, Leslie Edwards, Michael Somes, and Paul Raymond as the Brown Boys.

== Divertissements ==
The sequence of the divertissements, which takes about twenty-five minutes to perform, is as follows: entrée and pas de huit (Brown Couples), pas de patineurs (Blue Girls and Brown Couples), pas seul (Blue Boy), pas de deux (White Couple), ensemble, de suite par groupe (entire cast), pas de trois (Blue Boy and Blue Girls), pas de deux filles (Red Girls), pas de six (Brown Boys and Red Girls), pas de deux filles (Blue Girls), and finale (entire cast).

Despite the presence of Fonteyn and Helpmann in the romantic pas de deux for the White Couple, the main focus of the ballet was Harold Turner as the Blue Boy. Ashton's main aim in creating Les Patineurs was to create a spectacle that would rival the popularity of works presented in London by Colonel de Basil's Ballets Russes the previous summer.The Blue Boy is known as a difficult role to perform, and the Blue Girls hardly less so. Further, the Brown Boys are given choreography more usually performed by soloists than members of the corps de ballet.

== History ==
The inspiration for the work came from Constant Lambert, who was music director of the Vic-Wells Ballet during the 1930s and who exercised a major influence on the artistic as well as musical direction of the company. During his research, he chanced upon an old program for an 1849 ballet by Paul Taglioni entitled Les Plaisirs de l'Hiver, ou, Les Patineurs, which gave him the idea for a new skating ballet. To create the score he chose vocal and dance numbers from two Meyerbeer operas, Le prophète and L'étoile du nord, and linked them into an irresistibly cheerful score which begins with the waltz which opens Act 2 of L'Étoile du Nord. Ninette de Valois was originally intended to be the choreographer, but Frederick Ashton heard Lambert playing the score on a piano and asked if he could take it on. He knew little about ice skating, but one of his dancers, Elizabeth Miller, did, and she demonstrated some movements and tricks for him. Transforming them into balletic vocabulary, he set out to create a ballet that would reveal the virtuosity of the burgeoning English ballet and win the public's approval.

He succeeded beyond his highest hopes. After a triumphant premiere, Les Patineurs was performed in London every season from 1937 to 1968 (except 1960), in succession by the Vic-Wells Ballet, the Sadler's Wells Ballet, and the Royal Ballet. Touring companies performed it in many British cities from the 1950s to the 1980s. By 2011, it had been performed more than 350 times at the Royal Opera House, Covent Garden, alone. Productions have also been mounted in the United States, Canada, South Africa, Australia, New Zealand, Germany, France, and Turkey. The production mounted for American Ballet Theatre in 1946 had new scenery and costumes designed by Cecil Beaton, which were universally considered an unfortunate departure from Chappell's original décor.

== Recordings ==
Les Patineurs was one of the first ballets ever to be televised. The transmission by the BBC on 3 May 1937 from Alexandra Palace was not, however, recorded and preserved. Audio recordings of the score were made by Constant Lambert with the Sadler's Wells Orchestra in 1939 and later by many other conductors, including Jean Martinon, Charles Mackerras, Eugene Ormandy, Antal Doráti, Robert Irving, and Hugo Rignold. None of these well-known recordings is commercially available today. In December 2010, a video recording was made of a performance by the Royal Ballet at the Royal Opera House, Covent Garden, and issued on DVD by Opus Arte in 2011. Paul Murphy conducts the Royal Ballet Sinfonia, and the cast includes Steven McRae, Sarah Lamb, Rupert Pennefather, Laura Morera, Samantha Raine, Ryoichi Hirano, Liam Scarlett and Andrej Uspenski.
