= Moya Beaver =

Australian ballet dancer

Moya Beaver MBE
- Beaver in 1941
- Born: Moya Hilda Beaver; 18 February 1918; Stanmore, Sydney, Australia
- Died: 13 June 2012 (aged 94); Nerang, Queensland, Australia
- Other names: Mrs M Arkins; Moya Hilda Arkins
- Education: University of Sydney
- Occupation: Ballet dancer
- Spouse: Maurice Arkins (m. 1940)
- Children: 1

Moya Beaver (18 February 1918 – 13 June 2012) was an Australian ballet dancer. In 1936 she played the role of 'Ballerina' in the first Australian performance of Stravinsky's Petrushka at the Sydney Conservatorium of Music. She was awarded an MBE in the 1974 Birthday Honours in recognition of her service to the community.

== Personal life ==
Beaver was the oldest of two daughters of Julian Beaver and Hilda Beaver, née Trenbath, of Manly, Sydney. Her younger sister, Laurel, was born in 1925. When Beaver married Maurice James Arkins in June 1940 her wedding dress was decorated with gold embroidered ballerinas. In 1943 and 1944 Beaver studied physics and chemistry at the University of Sydney. In March 1943 she gave birth to a daughter, Gretel Moya. In 1947 she was living in Balgowlah, New South Wales, where she remained until the 1970s. Beaver donated her personal papers to the National Library of Australia in 2002.

== Early career ==
Beaver began her dance career age 16 in musical comedies from the Australian theatrical management company J. C. Williamson's (or JCW).

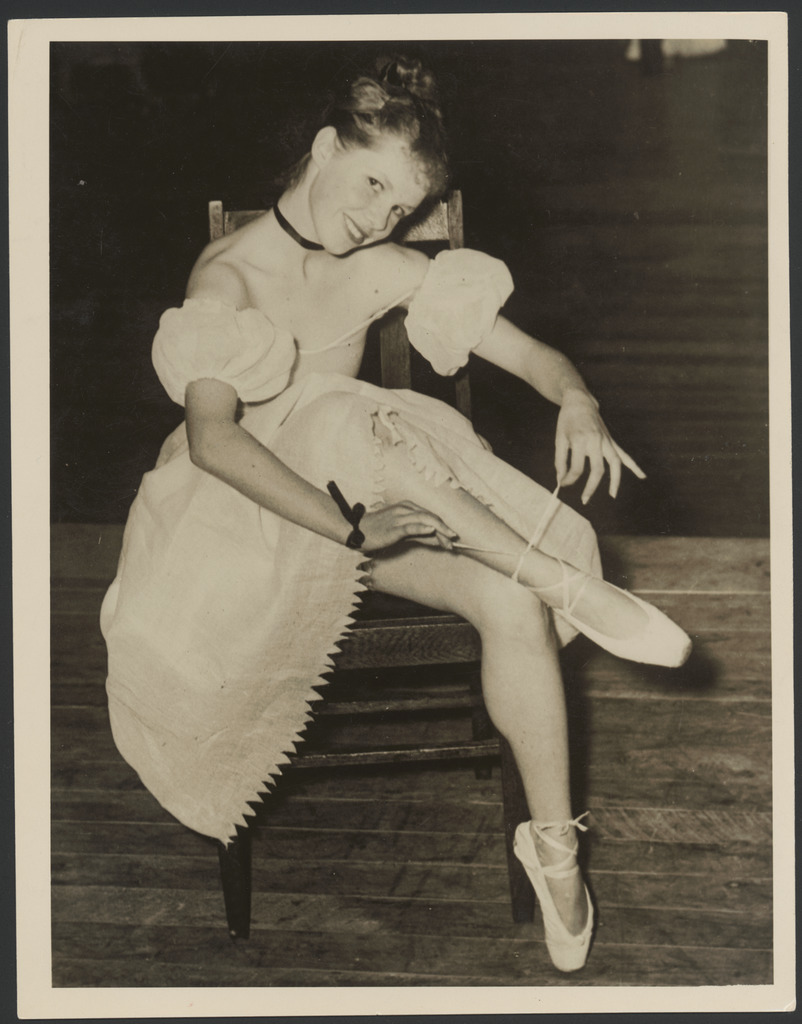
Beaver with First Australian Ballet, ca. 1935

In the mid-1930s she was principal dancer and teacher with First Australian Ballet (also called Burlakov-Lightfoot Ballet), under the direction of Mischa Burlakov and Louise Lightfoot. It was one of the first professional dance companies in Australia, and dancers were paid for rehearsals and performances. Beaver's roles included:

- 1934: Coppélia in Coppélia
- 1935: Columbine in Carnaval
- 1936: Lake of Swans (a four-scene version of Swan Lake), Walpurgis Night, Petruschka, Rococo
- 1938: Le Spectre de la Rose with Gordon Hamilton, Le Dieu bleu

She danced with the de Basil Ballet Company during its 1936 – 1937 tour to Australia and subsequently toured Europe with them. In 1937 Beaver qualified as a Cecchetti associate with the Imperial Society of Teachers of Dancing. In the same year she was advised by Polish ballet dancer Leon Woizikovsky to continue her study overseas.

=== Europe ===
In April 1939 Beaver travelled to Paris to train with Lyubov Yegorova (Madame Egrova) for three months. Having completed her studies, she was dancing with Ballet de Lejeunes in Copenhagen when WWII broke out. Together with many other British nationals (Beaver's mother was British), she travelled to England via Sweden and Norway, travelling on the ex-Kaiser's yacht from Bergen to Newcastle. While in England she stayed with fellow dancer Joy Camden. She returned to Australia on the same ship as de Basil's Ballet Company, "with whom she was able to practice and rehearse on the voyage".

== Australia, 1940 onwards ==
In 1940, together with Lynne Golding, Beaver danced with Thadée Slavinsky's Polish-Australian ballet company.

In 1941 Beaver rejoined J C Williamson's company, which three years previously had staged the world recording-breaking production of ‘’White Horse Inn’’. It produced a wide variety of entertainments, including touring ballet seasons. She appeared as premiere danseuse in JCW's Follies revue Funny Side Up at the Theatre Royal, Sydney, also featuring Betty Bryant, Helen Gilliland, Kitty Bluett and Dick Bentley. In the same year, she joined the first all-Australian professional ballet company Australian Ballet Nationale, directed by Leon Kellaway (also known as Jan Kowsky). The first pieces they performed were The North Wind and the Snowflake with music by Ravel, and The Nightingale and the Rose with music by Schubert.

In 1941, Beaver appeared in a film, 100,000 Cobbers, created by the Australian Department of Information and produced by Cinesound Productions. It followed five men in the run-up to their departure for war service.

By 1946 Beaver was running the Manly-based Moya Beaver School of Ballet, which ran until at least 1954.

== Other ==
From 1981 to 1983, Beaver served on the board of directors for Dalwood Children's Home.

== See also ==
- Lightfoot, Louise In Search of India: An Australian Dancer's Experience (2017) Pub. Cambridge Scholars Publishing ISBN 9781443892582
- Sarwal, Amrit The Dancing God: Staging Hindu Dance in Australia (2019) Pub. Routledge ISBN 9781000761993
- Sarwal, Amrit The Celestial Dancers: Manipuri Dance on Australian Stage (2022) Pub. Taylor & Francis ISBN 9781000625509
