= Eric Harrison (pianist) =

English pianist (1918–1970)

Eric Harrison (1918 – 24 August, 1970) was an English pianist, organist and teacher.

Harrison was born in Halifax. He fell out of his pram as an infant, injuring his nose, and also developed a life-long stutter. Harrison was educated at Crossley Heath School and won a scholarship to the Royal College of Music, where he studied piano under Cyril Smith. He also became a Fellow of the Royal College of Organists at the age of 17, where he studied with Arnold Goldsbrough.

He first came to wider public notice at the age of 21, replacing at short notice the announced soloist in the staging of the Fokine ballet Paganini (based on Rachmaninoff's Rhapsody on a Theme of Paganini), at Covent Garden in the summer of 1939. He had a formidable technique: he once transposed at sight the Schubert Bb Trio when the piano was found to be a minor third flat, and at his first Prom re-fingered the "Rach. Pag." (as he called it), to eliminate the use of his middle finger, which had an infection. He toured at home and abroad both as a soloist and with orchestras and ensembles (for instance, he performed as soloist in The Rio Grande by Constant Lambert at the Proms in 1948), was a frequent broadcaster, and recorded for the Pye label. He also performed with Hubert Dawkes as a piano duo, and often performed privately and informally for his friends: "eternally smoking, drinking interminable mugs of tea and coffee, playing at his best to, with and for friends".

Harrison was a successful teacher who taught at the Royal College of Music from 1947 until 1960. His pupils included Anthony Adkins, Kay Lam, Richard Nunn, Bernard Roberts and John White. With Geoffrey Tankard he published Piano Technique on an Hour a Day in 1960. He taught at Melbourne University in Australia for three years from 1960, before returning to the UK. After suffering a coronary he curtailed his teaching at the RCM, but he was for a year organist at St Martin in the Fields, and played as pianist in residence to the University of Cardiff Ensemble until his early death.

He was married to Diana Russell, and there were two children, one son and one daughter. He died suddenly, aged 52, while on holiday in Devon. His address at the end of his life was 2, Linden Avenue, Roath Park, Cardiff. The Royal College of Music awarded the Eric Harrison Piano Prize between 1970 and 2000.
