= Palucca University of Dance Dresden =

Educational institution in Dresden, Germany

- Palucca Hochschule für Tanz Dresden
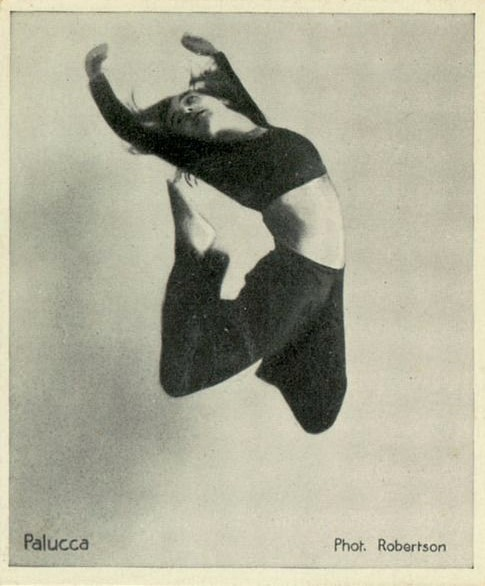
- Gret Palucca, 1920s
- Former names: Palucca School Dresden, Palucca School Dresden – University of Dance
- Established: 1925; 101 years ago
- Founder: Gret Palucca
- Rector: Jason Beechey
- Students: 181 (2020/21)
- Location: Dresden, Saxony, Germany; 51°1′44″N 13°46′16″E
- Website: palucca.eu

The Palucca University of Dance Dresden (German: Palucca Hochschule für Tanz Dresden), formerly the Palucca School Dresden, is a dance school in Dresden, Germany, founded in 1925 by the dancer and pedagogue Gret Palucca who taught until 1990. The school was recognised as a higher education institution in 1993 and took its current name in 2010.

== History ==
The school was founded in 1925 by Gret Palucca in Dresden. She initially taught in her apartment on the Bürgerwiese. Later she rented training rooms for her school in Dresden. Branches were opened in Berlin in 1928 and in Stuttgart in 1931. From 1939 to 1945, under the Nazi regime, Palucca was not allowed to teach because of her Jewish descent. On 15 July 1945, she reopened her school.

In 1949, the Palucca School in Dresden became a public state school. In 1953, construction work began on a new school building on Basteiplatz, which was completed in 1955. In 1988, a 24-minute episode of the series Jan and Tini of East German children's television was filmed at the school. Palucca taught at the school until 1990, when she was 88. In 2006, an apprentice programme was initiated in cooperation with the Dresden Semperoper Ballet, giving young dancers the opportunity to further develop their skills and apply them in professional practice.

The Palucca School Dresden was recognised by the State of Saxony as a higher education institution in 1993 and allowed to add University of Dance to its name in 1999. In 2010 it changed its name to Palucca University of Dance.

== Building ==
The older building wing with a neo-classical facade on Basteiplatz was built between 1953 and 1955. The design was by Fred Pietsch, Herbert Schneider and Gerd Dettmar. A modern extension on Wiener Strasse designed by the Hannover-based architects Storch Ehlers Partner, including dance halls, boarding school and physiotherapy facilities, was completed in 2007. The scheme extended the campus to include two neighbouring properties on Tiergartenstrasse, including the villa buildings. The new block has a glass facade and is almost square in shape, divided into four by two passageways. In 2011 the university adopted a new logo which references the coloured window frames of the new building.

The bronze sculpture above the main entrance is a work by Rudolf Löhner.

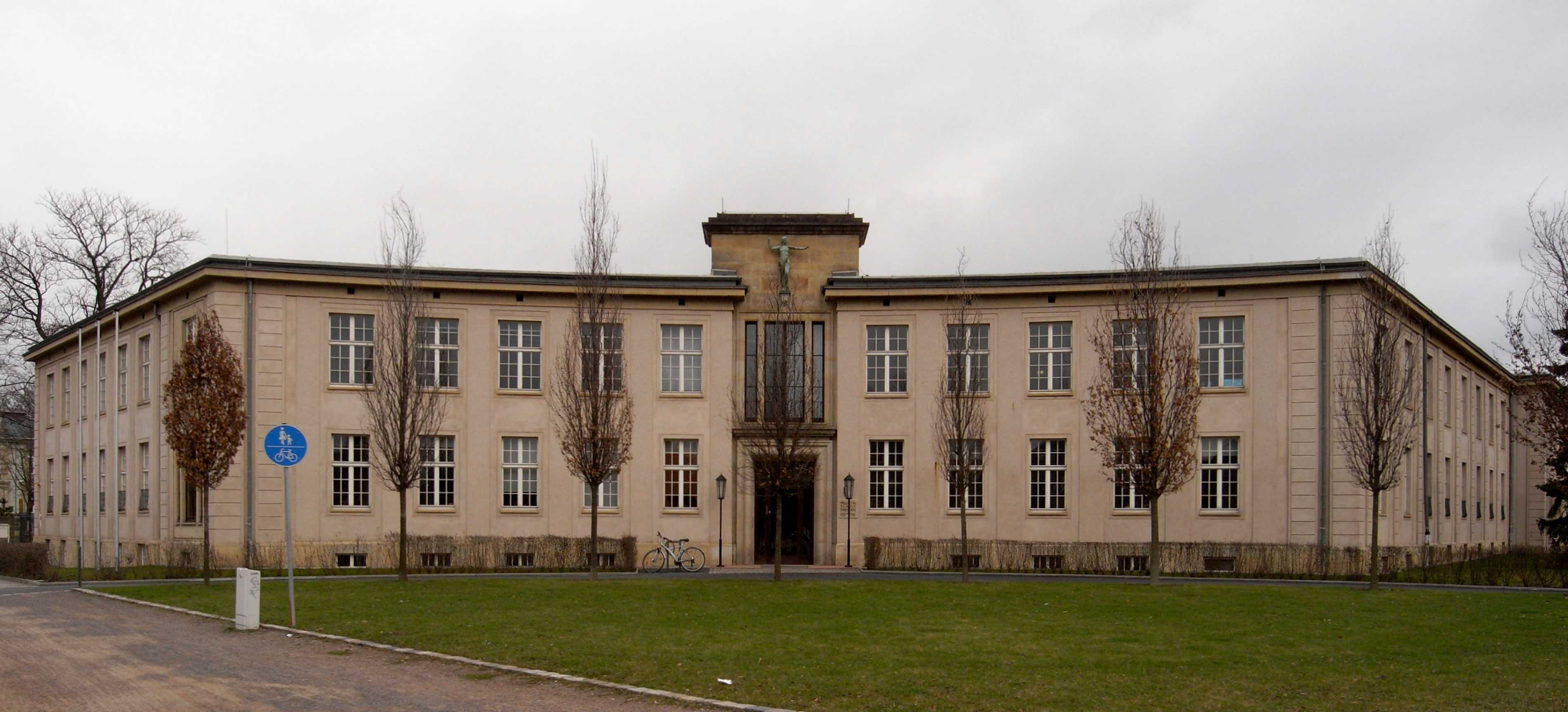
Main building in Basteiplatz

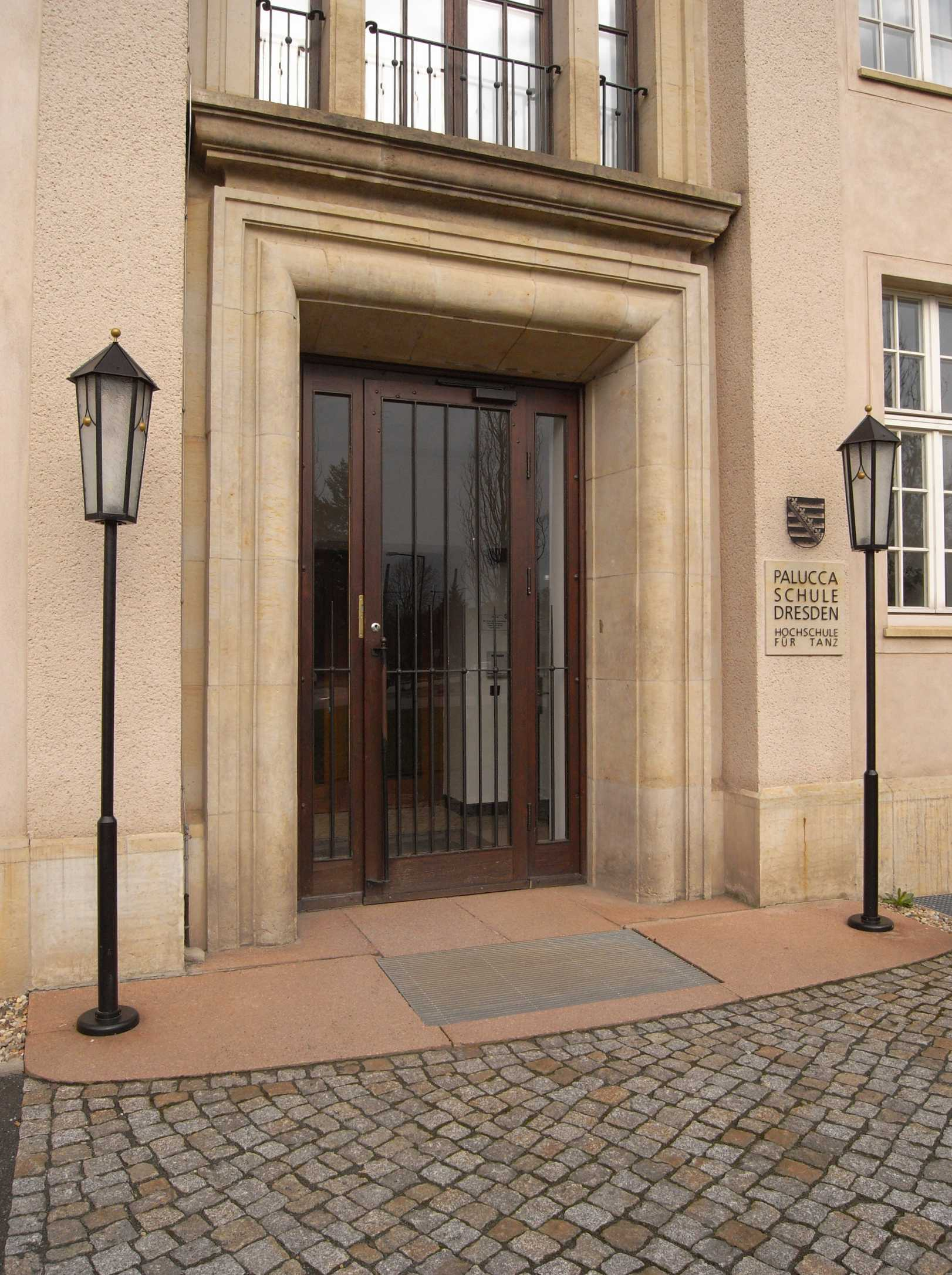
Main entrance, Basteiplatz

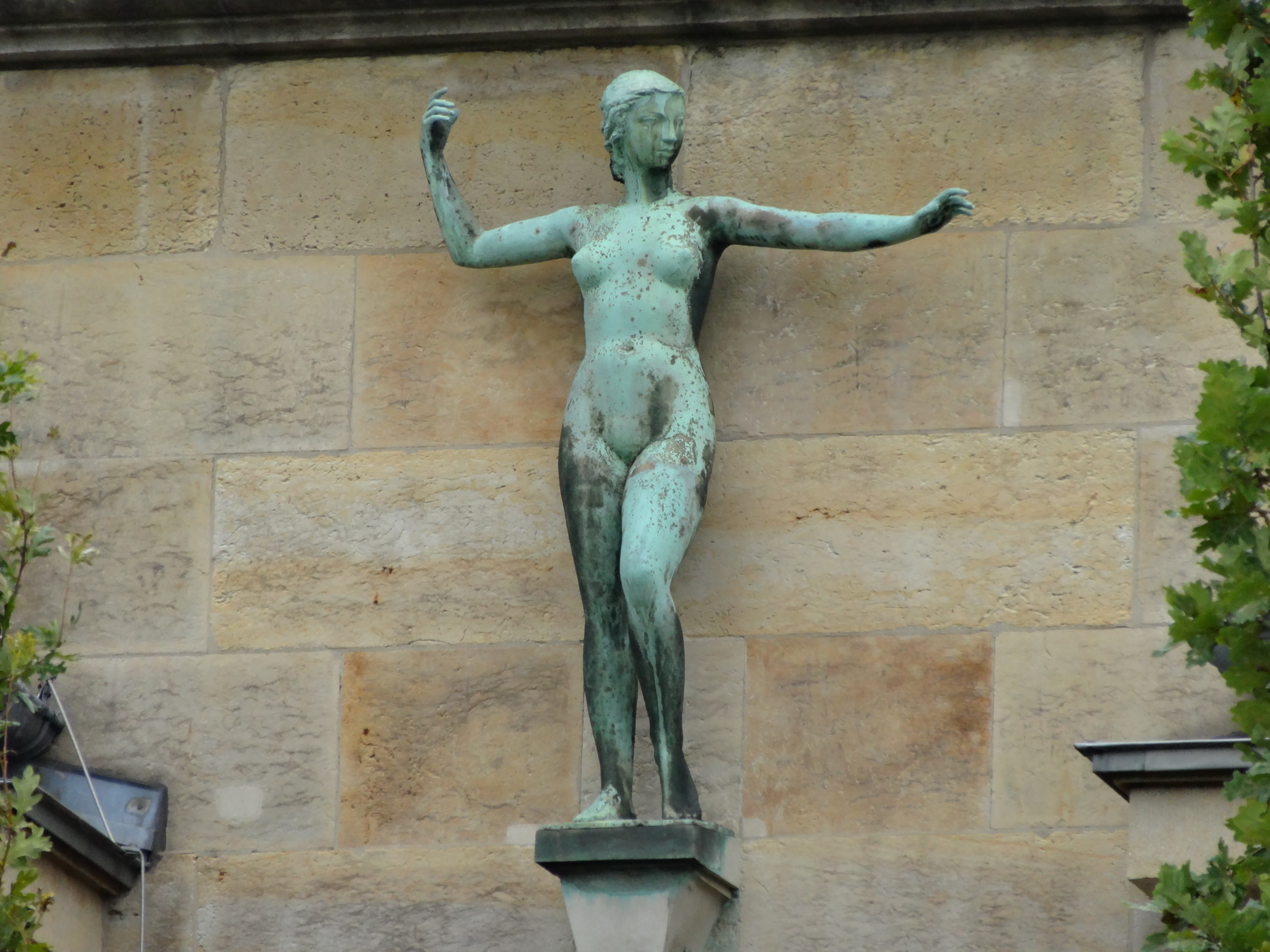
Dancer by Rudolf Löhner, above the main entrance

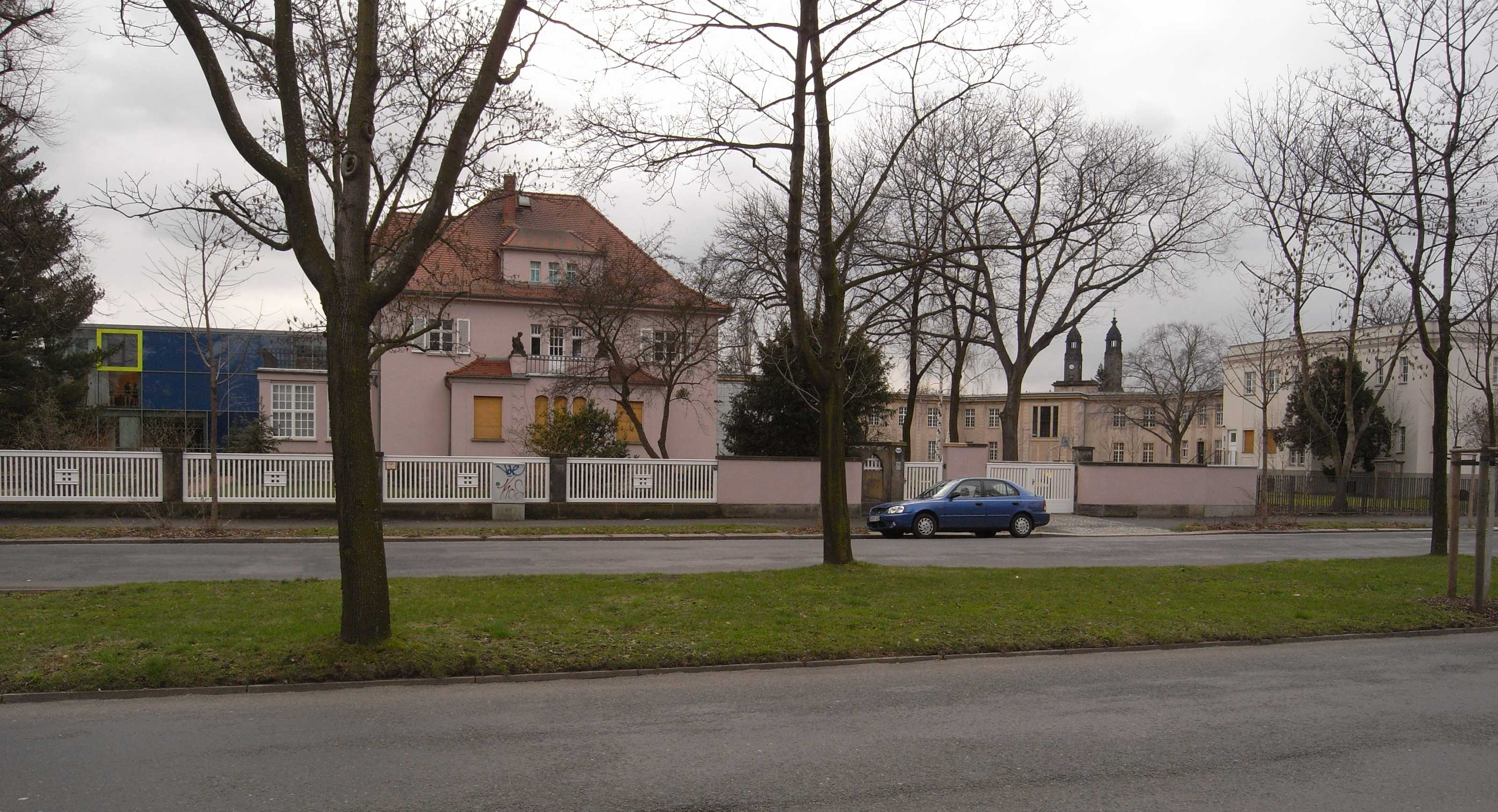
View of the campus

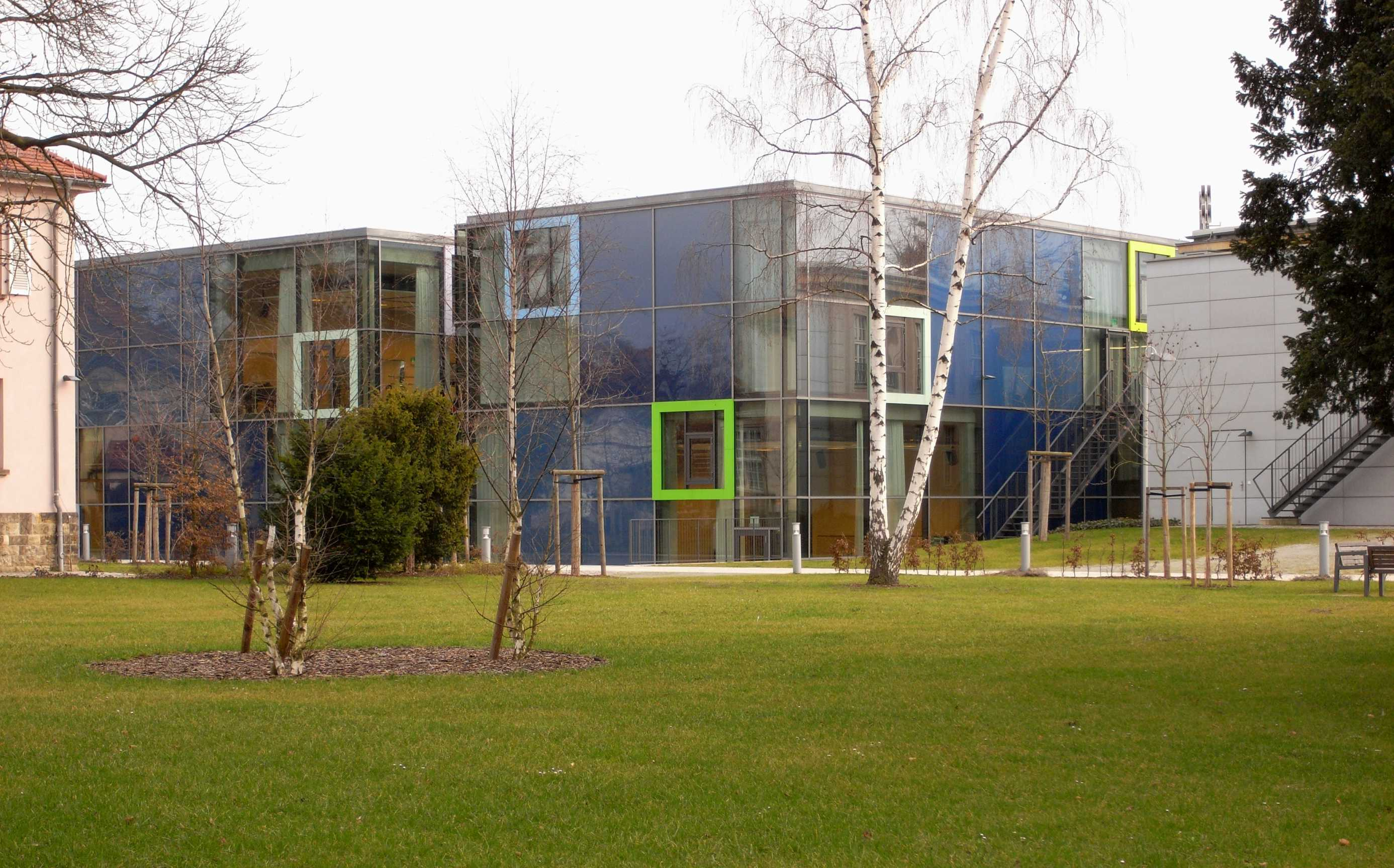
Modern extension by Storch Ehlers Partner

== Notable former students ==
- Hannelore Bey
- Mila Iskrenova
- Antonio Salinas
- Andrej Uspenski

== Notable teachers ==
- Colin Connor
- Benjamin Feliksdal
- Heike Hennig
