= Leslie Edwards (dancer) =

British ballet dancer and ballet master

Leslie Edwards OBE
- Born: 6 August 1916; Teddington, Middlesex, England
- Died: 8 February 2001 (aged 84); London, England
- Occupation: Ballet dancer

Leslie George Edwards OBE (6 August 1916 – 8 February 2001) was a British ballet dancer and ballet master. He was one of the final links with Ninette de Valois's original pre-war Vic-Wells Ballet. Apart from two years of military service during the Second World War, his entire 60-year career was effectively spent with what became the Royal Ballet organisation, until his final retirement from the stage in 1993.

== Early years ==
Edwards was born on 6 August 1916 and trained with Marie Rambert after leaving school at the age of 15. He then joined the Vic-Wells Ballet School. He also trained with Margaret Craske, Stanislav Idzikowski and Vera Volkova. He debuted at Rambert's Ballet Club in 1932.

== Performing career ==
Edwards was a cast member in the original production of Antony Tudor's Jardin aux Lilas in 1936. He first danced with the Vic-Wells Ballet in 1933, however, he only officially joined the company in 1937. With the Vic-Wells Ballet, he was a member of the first cast of Frederick Ashton's Les Patineurs. Edwards was known for his character roles rather than classical technique and later enjoyed purely mime roles. He taught mime at the Royal Ballet School while still a principal with the Royal Ballet. His career began in the supporting male roles before graduating to the villains. His niche, however, was in "the meatier roles in the mime and character repertory" such as the Red King in De Valois's Checkmate and as the American tourist in Massine's La Boutique fantasque. Edwards's success grew, however, after Frederick Ashton created the amiable role of Arthur for him in his A Wedding Bouquet of 1937. Edwards as the Beggar in Robert Helpmann's 1944 ballet Miracle in the Gorbals was deemed irreplaceable and he thus appeared in all 92 performances of the ballet. He was also notable as the farmer Thomas in Ashton's La Fille Mal Gardée of 1960. He had an unusually long 60-year career, which was interrupted only for two years of war service during the Second World War. However, he returned, after being invalided out, to create many more roles and he appeared in dozens of ballets. His most famous role was as Catalabutte in Sleeping Beauty.

=== Roles created for him ===
- Arthur in Ashton's A Wedding Bouquet, 1937
- Lawyer in de Valois's The Prospect Before Us, 1940
- Archimago in Ashton's The Quest, 1943
- the Beggar in Helpmann's Miracle in the Gorbals, 1944
- Chauffeur in Ashton's Les Sirènes, 1946
- Bilby in Howard's A Mirror for Witches, 1952
- Hypnotist in MacMillan's Noctambules, 1956
- Oedipus in Cranko's Antigone, 1959
- farmer Thomas in Ashton's La Fille Mal Gardée, 1960
- Basil G. Nevinson in Ashton's Enigma Variations, 1967

== Later years ==
Edwards worked as a rehearsal director for the Royal Ballet from 1959 to 1970. He was the first director of the newly formed Royal Ballet Choreographic Group from 1967 to 1987. Here he assisted many emerging British choreographers, including Ronald Hynd, Geoffrey Cauley, David Bintley and Michael Corder. He also served as ballet master for the Royal Opera from 1970 to 1990.

He was described as "gentle, unassuming, kindly, very distinguished in bearing – a senior civil servant among dancers – yet happily possessed of a wicked but never malicious sense of humour". He died at his home in London on 8 February 2001 after suffering from cancer. His autobiography, In Good Company: Sixty Years with the Royal Ballet, was published posthumously in 2003.

== Obituaries ==
- NY Times by Jack Anderson, 12 February 2001
- "Dance Magazine Obituary". Dance Magazine. 75 (5). Archived from the original on 31 May 2005 – via FindArticles.
- "Musical Opinion Obituary". Musical Opinion. 1 June 2001. Archived from the original on 22 October 2012 – via HighBeam Research.
