= Bernard Roberts =

English pianist

Bernard Roberts (23 July 1933 – 3 November 2013) was an English pianist. His treatment of the cycle of Beethoven's piano sonatas has been highly acclaimed.

Roberts was born in Manchester into a musical family. His mother was a pianist whose teacher was Egon Petri, and his father a part-time music critic for the Manchester Guardian. He studied at the Royal College of Music with Eric Harrison and Ferdinand Rauter. Roberts made his London debut at the Wigmore Hall in 1957, and began teaching at the RCM in 1962.

His recordings of the Beethoven sonatas were made in the 1980s and were among the first to appear on CD. He is also noted for his recordings of the music of Johann Sebastian Bach. Roberts' recording of the Well-Tempered Clavier, Books 1 and 2, performed on piano, was released in 1999 by Nimbus Records and was well received. Roberts also has recorded Bach's Six Partitas, BWV 825–30, and his French Suites, BWV 812–17. In collaboration with other performers, Roberts released discs of music for one and two pianos by Paul Hindemith and of trios by Frank Bridge.

According to Roberts' official home page, he has been the subject of a 40-minute BBC2 documentary, and he "particularly enjoys performing the piano trio repertoire with his sons Andrew and Nicholas".

Roberts commented that although he enjoyed making the Beethoven recordings, he feels his playing was somewhat restrained in the first "direct cut" recording.
