= Mila Iskrenova =

Bulgarian choreographer

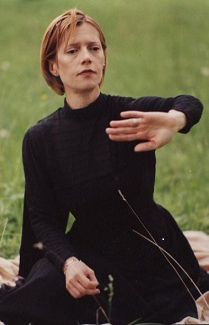
Mila Iskrenova

Mila Iskrenova (Bulgarian: Мила Искренова) (born 6 February 1960, in Sofia) is a Bulgarian modern dance choreographer, dancer and painter, co-founder of the Sofia Dance Week festival is considered one of the greatest creative forces in Bulgarian contemporary dance.

== Life ==
Iskrenova worked with Mary Hinson and Walter Raines at the International Summer Academy of Dance in Cologne, in the Palucca School of Dance, Dresden as well as in the Laban Dance Centre, London where she studied Choreography, Contemporary Dance, Choreological Studies and Improvisation. She is one of the most gifted and developed Bulgarian choreographers working in contemporary idiom. According to the critics she is skilful in the use of dance as a means of self-expression; the originality of her performances derives from her individual vision of modern art and her own artistic philosophy which includes mysticism and special focus on the complexity of human nature. Iskrenova is also notable for his frequent collaborations with artists of other disciplines. Since 1979 she is member and co-founder of the EK Dance Studio and teaches at the National School of Dance Arts – Sofia as well as in the State Academy of Music – Sofia, the National Academy for Theatre & Film Arts and at the Ballet Academy in Athens, Greece. Since 1989 she has been employed by the Bulgarian National Television as a Choreographer and since 1996 she is professor in Contemporary Dance in the Academia Philharmonica di Messina (Italy). In 1999 she was nominated as Honorary member of the Board of Trustees of the Academia Philharmonica di Messina. In 2001 she was appointed pedagogue and choreographer of Ballet Arabesque – one of the most experimental dance companies in Bulgaria. As a choreographer, teacher, and curator of the Sofia Dance Week festival. Mila Iskrenova has a profound influence on modern dance in Bulgaria.

== Works ==
STAGE

- Altars, (1988) – music by Assen Avramov
- Offertorium I (after Herman Broch), (1988) – music by Gheorghi Arnaoudov
- The fence, (1990) – music by Paul Hindemith
- Offertorium II (after Jorge Luis Borges), (1991) – music by Gheorghi Arnaoudov
- Trois gimnopedies (1991) – music by Erik Satie
- An Oddity (1991) – music by Gheorghi Arnaoudov
- Looking for the man (1992)
- The rescue Mozart (1994) – music by Mozart
- Wild and tender (1995) – music by Antonio Vivaldi and Teodosy Spassov
- Transpatium, (1996) – music by Gheorghi Arnaoudov and Assen Avramov
- Sacramentum (1995) – music by Samuel Barber, presented Ricochet Dance Company (UK)
