= Joy Newton =

English ballet dancer (1913–1996)

Joy Newton (May 1913 – 4 April 1996) was an English ballet dancer and teacher. She was one of the six young women who became the first members of the opera ballet at The Old Vic theatre and was a minor soloist and character dancer. Newton was the first teacher and principal of the National Turkish Ballet School from 1947 to 1951 and taught at the Royal Ballet School between 1963 and 1969.

== Biography ==
Newton was born in Wimbledon, London in May 1913. She was a child dancer as Will-o'-the-Wisp in Where the Rainbow Ends and became pupil of Ninette de Valois's Academy of Choreographic Art school (today the Royal Ballet School) from approximately 1927. Newton was one of the six young women who became the first members of the opera ballet at The Old Vic theatre in 1929, making her company debut in The Picnic ballet to music by Ralph Vaughan Williams. While still a pupil, she participated in works which de Valois presented at the Festival Theatre, Cambridge, and the Abbey Theatre, Dublin.

As a minor soloist and character dancer, she had a cameo appearance as the Ballad Singer in The Rake's Progress, which de Valois had created for her when the ballet premiered in 1935. Newton was cast as the Queen Mother in Swan Lake, The Sleeping Beauty, Les Patineurs and as the princess or as the heroine's mother in Giselle. By the start of the Second World War, she was the only remaining dancer from the original team still with the company, and she and her fellow members entertained troops. When de Valois had to have an assistant ballet mistress at Sadler's Wells Ballet in 1940, Newton's earned the role through company loyalty, and she won promotion to ballet mistress in 1942. Newton was part of the company's tour of the neutral Netherlands in May 1940 and arrived back to the United Kingdom after Nazi Germany invaded the country four days into the planned ten performances.

At the conclusion of the war, and following the company's first season at Covent Garden in 1946, Newton left to become the first teacher and principal of the National Turkish Ballet School and Company which the Government of Turkey had requested de Valois to establish in Istanbul, and she took up the job at de Valois's behest. She remained in Istanbul until 1951, during which time she played a part in establishing the Turkish National Ballet. Newton later returned to assist in the mounting of Giselle and Les Rendezvous for dancers from the Turkish school. She returned to London and taught at the Royal Ballet School between 1963 and 1969. Newton later retired, but continued to attend dress rehearsals, and assisted in the revivals of ballets from the early repertoire, such as the ballet Coppélia in December 1973, and The Nutcracker in December 1977. She also ran a small antique shop in Kent. The last revival Newton worked on was de Valois's production of Job: A Masque for Dancing in Birmingham in 1993.

== Personal life and death ==
She married Walter Postlethwaite in 1949. Newton died suddenly while working in her garden on 4 April 1996.

== Legacy ==
The Joy Newton Collection is held by the Royal Ballet School Special Collections. It includes five boxes of letters of correspondence, hand-written choreographic notes, music scores and photographs.
