= Gordon Hamilton (dancer) =

Australian ballet dancer

- Born: 1918; Sydney, Australia
- Died: 14 February 1959 (aged 40–41); Paris, France
- Occupation: Ballet dancer

Gordon Hamilton (1918 – 14 February 1959) was an Australian ballet dancer.

== Early life and education ==
Gordon Hamilton was born in Sydney in 1918. Hamilton trained with Mischa Burlakov aged 18, and then Leon Kellaway.

== Career ==
Hamilton's first role was in 1937, in the First Australian Ballet's production of Carnaval as Moya Beaver's partner. He later moved to London.

Hamilton created roles in Robert Helpmann's Hamlet (1942), Miracle in the Gorbals (1944) and Adam Zero (1966); and in Roland Petit's Les Demoiselles de la nuit (1948) and Carmen (1949).

Hamilton gave Ninette de Valois her famous nickname, Madam, when he created the role of an aging butterfly hunter in Promenade in 1943.

In 1954, Hamilton was appointed ballet master with the Vienna State Opera.

Hamilton died on 14 February 1959 in Paris.
