= Colin Connor =

- Born: 18 June 1954 (age 72); London, England
- Occupations: Dancer, choreographer, educator
- Website: http://www.colinconnor.com

Colin Connor (born 18 June 1954) is a Canadian–British dancer, choreographer, and educator, based in the United States.

== Biography ==
Connor was born in London, England. He received his first formal dance training in Canada. In addition to his role as choreographer, Connor performed as a dancer from the late 1970s through the 2000s. He danced for eight years as a soloist with the Limón Dance Company and also danced with the Mary Anthony Dance Theater. Additionally, he performed in his own work and was a guest with many other companies. Connor was also a core teacher initiating a new summer Limon workshop for Southern California and is a School of Dance faculty member at the California Institute of the Arts. Currently, he lives in the Los Angeles area.

== Artistic philosophy ==
Connor describes his work as, "rooted in the mystery of how we live in our physical beings. It is an ongoing investigation of perception, both of dancers and audience, and based on how, in the end, all human experience is felt through the senses. With our lives increasingly mediated by various technologies, I believe that art which focuses attention back to the completeness of how we live in our bodies becomes ever more essential."

Performances have been described in the press as "earthy, a little rough and daring, sexy and totally spellbinding," (Dance Magazine) and his work has been called "a metaphor for human resilience," (The Village Voice). Additionally, his choreography drew this response from Jennifer Dunning of The New York Times: "a relief these days to see movement treated as a sufficiently expressive medium."

== Teaching ==
As an educator, Connor has been on the faculties of New York University, where he also worked as a choreographer and movement teacher for the Theater Department's Classical Studio. He also worked at the Juilliard School and the City College of New York, the latter also as Choreographer in Residence. He has been a guest teacher at numerous dance training centers in the world including The Place in London, the Rotterdamse Dansacademie, Jacob's Pillow, Dresden's Palucca University of Dance Dresden, the Joffrey Summer Workshop, The Dance Studio in Novosibirsk, Russia, and the Rubin Academy in Jerusalem. He has been on the full-time faculty at the California Institute of the Arts (CalArts) since 2004.

== Collaboration ==
According to his biography on the CalArts web site, Connor's "major collaborations include Solea and the Winds, a radical contemporary/flamenco evening which toured to critical acclaim for three years across Europe, Secondhand Sofa with bluegrass band The Biscuit Boys for the Piccolo Spoleto Festival, What The Waitress Saw, a deconstruction of a diner (with Emmy Award-winning theater designer, Charles Schoonmaker) for the Boston Conservatory's Copland Celebration with orchestra performing his clarinet concerto, and Near Ruins, a duet."

== Commissions ==
Future productions are scheduled in 2010–2011 for Canadian Children's Dance Theatre (Toronto, Ontario, Canada), The Joyce Theater (New York), The Kennedy Center (Washington, D.C.), The Meeting House (Newport, Rhode Island), Richmond Ballet (Richmond, Virginia), and Island Moving Company (Newport, Rhode Island).

== Works ==
Connor has choreographed over 40 works including:

- 2010 Corvidae – Selected for the 2010 ACDFA gala performances at The Kennedy Center
- 2009 ARENA – Commission for the Canadian Children's Dance Theatre
- 2007 News Falls Like Rain – Solo for Debra Noble performed at Flight of Steps and on tour in Guatemala; Holdfast (The Fragile Warmth of Collisions in Freefall) – Commission for Island Moving Company and Simon Fraser University
- 2005 Into the Air – Commission for Richmond Ballet; The Study of Man (collaboration with composer, Mark Trayle) – Performances at the REDCAT Theater and Cal Arts
- 2004 The Rose Garden – Commission for Island Moving Company and University of California, Irvine
- 2003 Secondhand Sofa – Winner of Charleston Ballet Theatre's Fountainhead Choreography Competition
- 2002 Recent Arrivals – Commission for Island Moving Company
- 2000 Vestiges – Commission for Richmond Ballet, Joyce Theater Performance (2010)
- 1999 Solea and the Winds (Lovesongs) – In collaborative with Flamencos En Route, over one hundred performances across Europe
- 1998 Full Sail (In Praise of Storms) – Winner of the Sarasota Ballet International Choreography Competition; Streets and Legends – Commission for Richmond Ballet, remounted on Atlanta Ballet Joyce Theater performances (1999)
- 1997 Pyre – For Damaru Dance Company and Eisenhower Dance Ensemble (2009)
- 1995 Near Ruins (duet for Colin Connor and Risa Steinberg) – The Salvage Company
- 1994 Flaws In The Glass – Commissioned by The Carlisle Project, remounted on Hartford Ballet & The Juilliard School
