= Cyril Smith (pianist) =

English virtuoso concert pianist

- Cyril (and Phyllis)

Background information
- Born: Cyril James Smith; 11 August 1909; Middlesbrough, England
- Died: 2 August 1974 (aged 64) East Sheen, London, England
- Genres: Romantic, 20th century
- Occupations: Virtuoso pianist, pedagogue
- Instrument: Piano

Cyril James Smith OBE (11 August 1909 – 2 August 1974) was a virtuoso concert pianist of the 1930s, 1940s and 1950s, and a piano teacher.

== Personal life ==
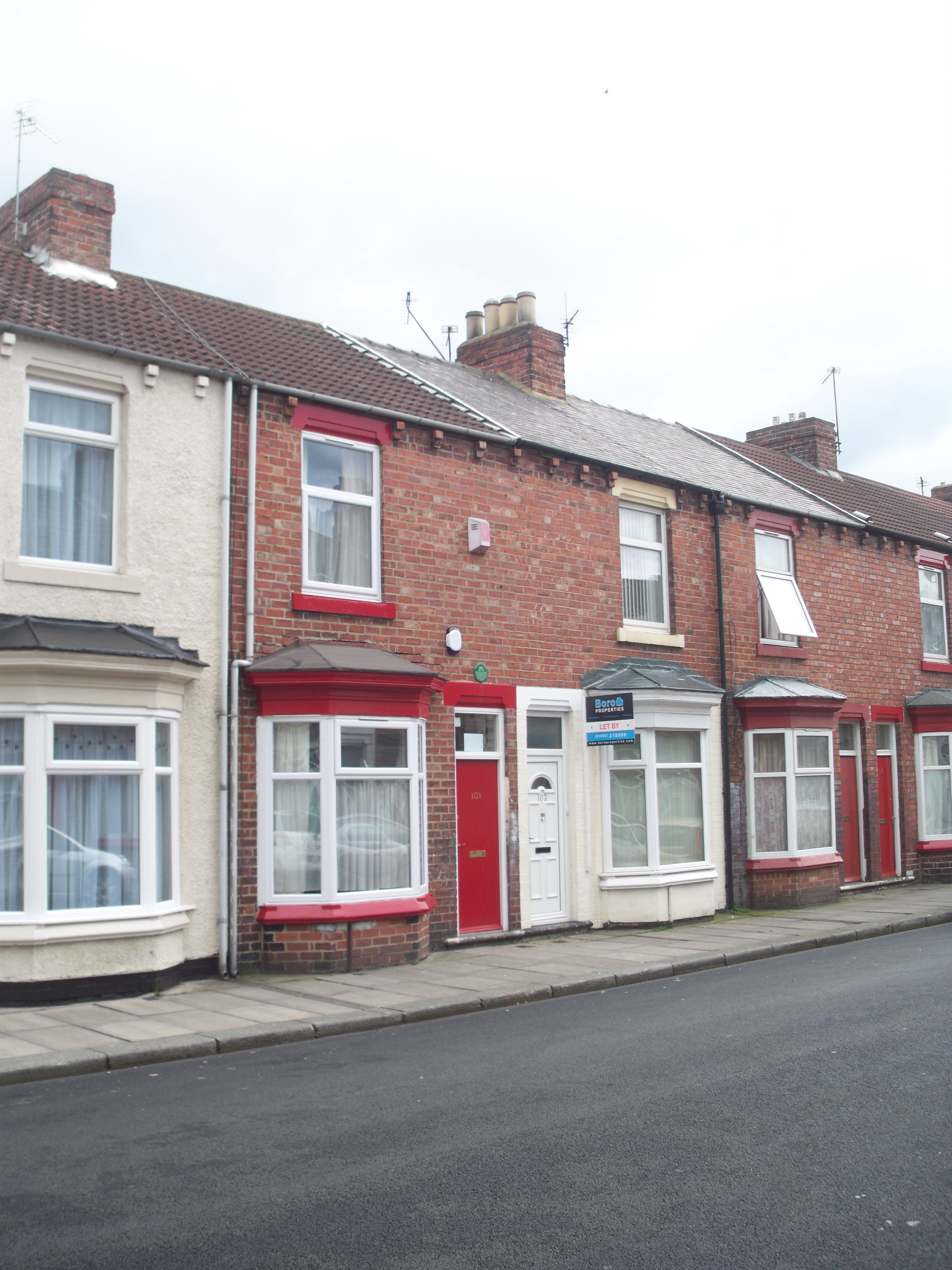
Birthplace

Smith was born at Costa Street, Middlesbrough, England, the son of Charles Smith, a foundry bricklayer, and Eva Harrison, and had an older brother and sister. He married Andrée Antoinette Marie Paty in 1931, but the couple divorced.

In 1937 he married Phyllis Sellick. They had a son, Graham, and a daughter, Clare and remained married until his death. Smith died in 1974 at his home in East Sheen, London, as a result of a stroke.

== Performing ==
From 1926 to 1930, Cyril Smith studied with Herbert Fryer (a student of Tobias Matthay and Ferruccio Busoni) at the Royal College of Music, winning medals and prizes including the Daily Express piano contest in 1928 and made his concert début in Birmingham in 1929. He performed as an off-screen piano accompanist in several of the 30-line Baird system television broadcasts of 1935 and joined the BBC when they took over. It was at the BBC's early television studios that he met his future second wife, the pianist Phyllis Sellick.

In 1934, Smith left the BBC to take up an appointment as professor of pianoforte at the Royal College of Music. Smith and Sellick married in 1937, pursuing solo careers. During the Second World War Cyril Smith performed concerts for ENSA but in 1941 he and his wife began performing together as a piano duo at the Proms, and made many international concert tours for ENSA and the British Council In 1945, they toured the Far East, where the hazards to contend with included small animals lodged in pianos and out-of-tune instruments.

Smith's work was largely from the Rachmaninoff, Chopin, Schubert, Balakirev, and Albéniz repertoire. Malcolm Arnold, Sir Arthur Bliss, Gordon Jacob and Ralph Vaughan Williams also wrote music for the duo. Among Cyril Smith's many performances were appearances at The Barn Theatre, Oxted, in the 1930s and at the Proms in 1930, 1937, 1941, 1944, 1946, 1953 and 1969.

In 1956, while in the city of Kharkiv in Ukraine at the start of a concert tour of the Soviet Union he experienced thrombosis and had a stroke that paralysed his left arm. However, with music arranged by themselves, or written or arranged by composer friends, Smith and Sellick were able to continue to perform concerts of three-handed music as a piano duo.

Notable among the works composed for them was Malcolm Arnold's Concerto for Two Pianos (3 hands), Op. 104, dedicated to the performers, who premiered it at the Proms in 1969 and recorded it in 1970.

== Teaching ==
Cyril Smith and Phyllis Sellick both taught piano at the Royal College of Music – Smith was appointed professor of pianoforte in 1934. Among those who studied piano with him are: Ray Alston, John Barstow, Clifford Benson, Philip R Buttall, Maureen Challinor, June Clark, Margaret Fingerhut, Patrick Flynn, Eric Harrison, Joan Havill, David Helfgott, Peter Hill, Antony Hopkins, Niel Immelman, Rae de Lisle, Barry Morgan, Thalia Myers, Siva Oke, Aydin Önaç, Jennifer Pearce, June Pepin, Joan Ryall, Stephen Savage, Kimberly Schmidt, Jo Spanjer, Kathron Sturrock, Sharon Joy Vogan, David Ward, Fanny Waterman, Gillian Weir, Kenneth Weir, Frank Wibaut, Simon Young, and David Waldmann. In 1973 Cyril Smith was once again appointed professor of pianoforte until his death the next year.

== Autobiography ==
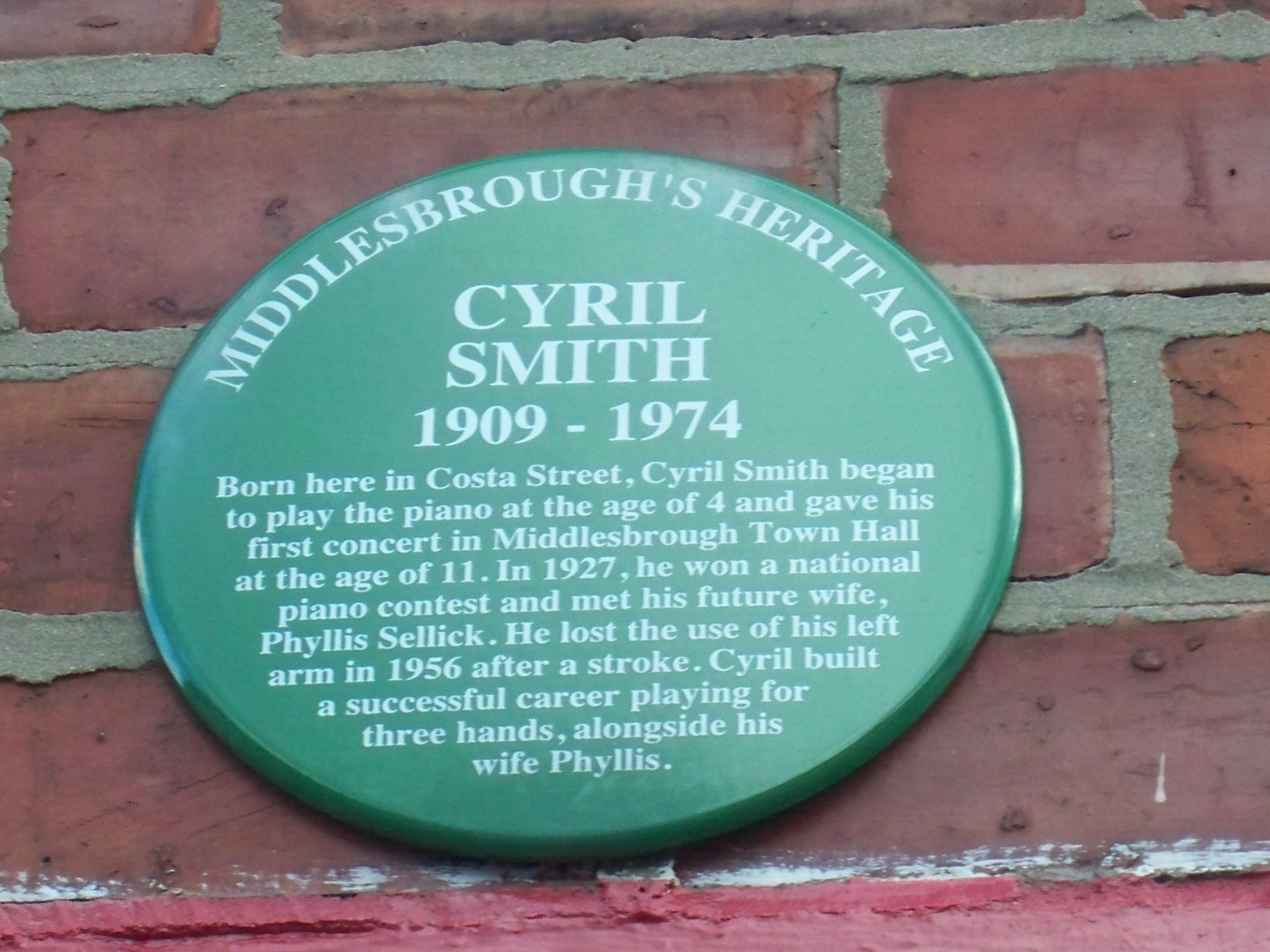
plaque

Cyril Smith's autobiography written in the form of a memoir, is entitled Duet for Three Hands (Angus & Robertson, 1958). One of the chapters was written by his wife Phyllis Sellick.

== Honours ==
Cyril Smith and Phyllis Sellick were both made Officers of the Order of the British Empire in 1971.

Smith was the subject of This Is Your Life in 1960 when he was surprised by Eamonn Andrews at the BBC Television Theatre.

== Discography ==
- Cyril Smith, Phyllis Sellick and the Liverpool Philharmonic Orchestra and Philharmonia Orchestra (conductor Malcolm Sargent), Dutton, (P)1947/48
- Phyllis Sellick, Cyril Smith, Orchestras of the Bournemouth Symphony, Philharmonia, City of Birmingham and the Royal Philharmonic, Arnold: English Dances, HMV Classics
- Cyril Smith, Phyllis Sellick and Solna Brass, including Rhapsody for Piano (3 hands) by Gordon Jacob, Granada
- Cyril Smith & Phyllis Sellick, Piano Duos: Faure Mendessohn Franck Schubert, Nimbus Records, (P)1974 (Cyril's last recording)
- Cyril Smith, The Complete Solo Recordings (recorded 1929–52), APR 7313 (3 CDs)
