= David Paltenghi =

British ballet dancer and choreographer; film actor and director (1919–1961)

David Paltenghi (1919 – 4 February 1961) was an English ballet dancer and choreographer; film actor and director.

== Early life ==
David Paltenghi was born in 1919 in Christchurch, Hampshire (now Dorset), the son of a Swiss-Italian father and English mother.

== Career ==
=== Dancer ===
He was a dancer with Ballet Rambert, until joining Sadler's Wells Ballet in 1941. Paltenghi created leading roles in Robert Helpmann's Miracle in the Gorbals in 1944 and Adam Zero in 1946, both for Sadler's Wells Ballet.

=== Choreographer ===
In 1950, he rejoined Ballet Rambert as a guest artist, and as a choreographer, created five ballets from 1950 to 1951. The last was Canterbury Prologue, based on Chaucer's Canterbury Tales with music by Peter Racine Fricker and designs by the artist Edward Burra, who he had met when they both worked on Miracle in the Gorbals.

=== Film director ===
Paltenghi later became a film director, and his 1955 The Love Match starring Arthur Askey was praised, "gets the utmost out of every laugh without belaboring the point".

== Later life ==
He died on 4 February 1961 in Windsor, Berkshire.

His son Julian Celeste Paltenghi is a painter and sculptor.

== Films ==
=== Director ===
- Orders Are Orders (1954)
- The Love Match (1955)
- Keep It Clean (1956) – The Husband in 'Ring Around the Rosy'

=== Actor ===
- Sleeping Car to Trieste (1948) – Vincente (uncredited)
- The Queen of Spades (1949) – Officer in the gaming room
- The Black Knight (1954) – High Priest
- Invitation to the Dance (1956) – The Husband in 'Ring Around the Rosy'
- Port Afrique (1956) – Le Badinage Patron (uncredited)
- The Battle of the River Plate (1956) – Customs Officer (uncredited) (final film orle)
