= Hannelore Bey =

German ballet dancer

- Born: Hannelore Mueller; November 6, 1941 (age 83); Leipzig, Germany
- Education: Palucca School of Dance; Waganowa Academy
- Occupation: Prima ballerina at the Komische Oper Berlin

Hannelore Bey (née Mueller; born 6 November 1941, in Leipzig) was a prima ballerina at the Komische Oper Berlin.

== Life ==
She studied from 1956 to 1961 at the Palucca School of Dance in Dresden. She then studied from 1965 to 1966 at the Waganowa Academy in Leningrad with Belikowa and Puschkin. She was a member of the National Theatre of Dresden from 1961 to 1965 and was a member of the Komische Oper Berlin from 1966. She became a prima ballerina in 1969. In 1975 she had a son Oliver Bey. From 1983 to 1991 she was a member of the Akademie der Künste and she toured in Finland, Norway, Yugoslavia, Romania, Italy, Spain, Iceland, Greece, Czech Republic, Slovakia, France, USSR, Cuba and Egypt.

In 1985 she retired and was made an honourable member of the Komische Oper Berlin. Since her retirement she has become a critic for the Berlin newspaper, Trägerin. Since 1996 she has been a professor at the Palucca school of dance.

== Awards ==
In 1973 she was awarded with the National Prize of East Germany, while in 1981 she was awarded with the Fatherland Order of Merit.

== Main roles ==
- "Abraxas" , 1966
- "fantastic symphony" , 1967
- "Cinderella" , 1968
- "Dornrö" , 1968
- "Giselle, state State of Berlin, Chemnitz" , 1968
- "La Mer" , 1969
- "Undine" , 1970
- "match" , 1971
- "Romeo and Julia" , 1972
- "party" , 1973
- "the badly protected daughter" , 1974
- "black birds" , 1975
- "revue" , 1977 * to ", 1979
- "swan lake" , 1980
- "DEFA feature "I may say Petruschka Pastorale" to you? " ", 1981
- "Shakespeare shapes" , 1982
- "Wahlverwandtschaften" , 1983
- "Walzer" , 1988
- "Bernarda Albas house" , 1990

== Filmography ==
- Cinderella, Berlin Comic Opera Ballet DVD
