= Universidad de Xalapa =

University

Coordinates: 19.5191°N 96.8811°W

The Universidad de Xalapa is a university in the city of Xalapa, Veracruz, Mexico.

The institution was founded on September 28, 1992, by entrepreneurs Carlos García Méndez, Rubén Pabello Rojas, Carmen Sosa de Pabello and Isabel Soberano de la Cruz as a response to the demand from youngsters with not much career options in the area. It is considered as the pioneer of the private universities in the city which as 2016 includes more than a hundred schools. In this days the university, also known only by its acronym UX, offers 25 careers College in a full-time basis and 6 in the Saturday system (known as open system in Mexican education managed by Secretaria de Educacion Publica) and has opened part-time versions of 5 careers. It is also offered graduate studies including 5 M.Sc. and 5 Ph.D. options, In 2019 open UX Digital online model based in the academic model Edu-Gestión, created and owned by the Universidad de Xalapa.

Full Time Careers Electronics and Telecommunications Engineering, Management computational Systems Engineering, Mechatronics Engineering, Enterprise Business Management, Accountancy, International Business Management, Marketing, Communications Science and Techniques, Law, Education, Psychology, Nursery, Agricultural Business Management, Graphic Design and Visual Communication, Visual Arts, Architecture, Artificial Intelligence Engineering

Open System Careers Enterprise Business Management, Accountancy, International Business Management, Law, Journalism, Communication, International Business, Enterprise Business Management

Part Time Careers Management computational Systems Engineering, Law, Education, Communication, International Business, Enterprise Business Management
