= Checkmate (ballet) =

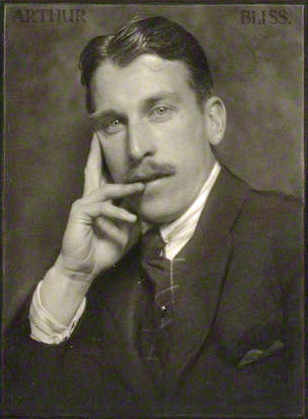
- Arthur Bliss c. 1922
- Choreographer: Ninette de Valois
- Music: Arthur Bliss
- Based on: Chess
- Premiere: 15 June 1937; Théâtre des Champs-Élysées, Paris
- Original ballet company: Vic-Wells Ballet
- Characters: Black Queen; Red Knight; Death; Red King; Red Queen leader of the Black Pawns
- Design: Edward McKnight Kauffer
- Setting: Chessboard
- Genre: Neoclassical ballet

Checkmate is a one act ballet created by the choreographer Ninette de Valois and composer Arthur Bliss. The idea for the ballet was proposed by Bliss, and subsequently produced by de Valois for the Vic-Wells Ballet. It was first performed on 15 June 1937 at the Théâtre des Champs-Élysées, Paris. Checkmate is widely regarded as de Valois' signature ballet and a cornerstone of the British ballet repertoire, being performed regularly by the Royal Ballet and Birmingham Royal Ballet.

== Overview ==
After World War I, Bliss developed an interest in ballet, after seeing the Ballets Russes of Sergei Diaghilev in London. Bliss composed Checkmate for the Vic-Wells Ballet (later the Sadler's Wells Ballet), who produced the first performance at the Théâtre des Champs-Élysées in 1937. Constant Lambert conducted the Orchestre Lamoureux, and the premiere dancers included the following:

- June Brae (Black Queen)
- Harold Turner (Red Knight)
- Michael Somes (Black Knight)
- Frederick Ashton (Death)
- Robert Helpmann (Red King)
- Pamela May (Red Queen)
- Margot Fonteyn (leader of the Black Pawns)
- Annabel Farjeon (a pawn)

The UK premiere of Checkmate was on 5 October 1937 at Sadler's Wells. The music received its first radio broadcast performance on 15 October 1937, over the BBC.

== Sections ==
- Prologue—The Players: Moderato maestoso
- Dances of the Red Pawns: Allegro spirito scherzando
- Dance of the Four Knights: Allegro moderato sempre robustamente
- Entry of the Black Queen: L'istesso tempo
- The Red Knight's Mazurka: Moderato giojosamente
- Ceremony of the Red Bishops: Largamente (misticamente)
- Entry of the Red Castles: Allegro molto deciso
- Entry of the Red King and Queen: Grave
- The Attack: Allegro impetuoso e brillante
- The Duel: Maestoso moderato e molto appassionato
- The Black Queen Dances: Allegretto dispettoso
- Finale—Checkmate: Andante poco sostenuto—allegro vivace e feroce

== Synopsis ==
The premise of the ballet is that the chess pieces become animated and act out human emotions. The main conflict of the story concerns the Red Knight's love for the Black Queen. In the Prologue, two chess players are shown, ready to do battle. The player in gold represents Love and chooses the red side. The player in black represents Death and takes the black side.

The ballet proper begins with the Red Pawns assembling on the chessboard. The Red Knights arrive on the scene, afterwards joined by the Black Knights. The Black Knights prostrate themselves at the entry of the Black Queen, who fills them with fear. The Black Queen makes advances to the Red Knight and tosses him a rose, and the Red Knight becomes infatuated with the Black Queen.

The Red King and Red Queen arrive, with the old Red King requiring assistance. An initial "game" between the two sides finishes as the Black Queen has the Red King in a "check" position. This game leads to a duel between the Red Knight and the Black Queen, where the Red Knight is victorious over the Black Queen. However, he cannot bring himself to kill her because of his love for her. In one moment, he turns his back and recalls the rose from the Black Queen. The Black Queen takes advantage and fatally stabs the Red Knight. The funeral cortège for the Red Knight is described as "Death leading, Love at the end of the procession".

The Black Queen then turns on the Red King, and the Black forces surround him. The Red King has one last moment of recalling his youth before the Black Queen stabs him in the back with a spear, in the final "checkmate".

== Recordings ==
- VAI DVD 4379: Margaret Barbieri (Black Queen), David Ashmole (Red Knight), David Bintley (Red King), Sherilyn Kennedy (Red Queen), Michael Corder, Roland Price, Nicholas Millington (knights), Dancers of the Sadler's Wells Royal Ballet, Sadler's Wells Royal Ballet Orchestra, Barry Wordsworth, conductor (complete video of ballet)
- World Record Club T52: The Sinfonia of London, conducted by the composer (suite)
- ASV CD WLS 255: Royal Ballet Sinfonia; Barry Wordsworth, conductor (complete ballet)
- Naxos 8.557641: Royal Scottish National Orchestra; David Lloyd-Jones, conductor (complete ballet)
- BBC Music Magazine Vol. 7 no. 8 (BBC MM80): BBC Symphony Orchestra; Norman Del Mar, conductor (suite: nos. 1-6 and finale)
- English Northern Philharmonia: David Lloyd-Jones, conductor. Hyperion. (Excerpts)
