= Miracle in the Gorbals =

Ballet

Miracle in the Gorbals (1944) is a one-act ballet choreographed by Robert Helpmann to a story by Michael Benthall, with music by Arthur Bliss. The setting is the 1940s slums in the Gorbals area of Glasgow. It became a staple of the Royal Ballet, performed each season from 1944 to 1950 and receiving a revival in 1958.

== Background ==
The idea for the scenario for Miracle in the Gorbals came to Michael Benthall while he was working on a gun site in Glasgow. He worked on a detailed story and the characters, discussing the action with dancer and choreographer Robert Helpmann. The next collaborator to be identified was the designer, Edward Burra. The composer Arthur Bliss set to work on the score, with scenario and initial designs before him. The Royal Ballet performed the ballet every season from 1944 to 1950 and revived it in 1958, but it did not perform it in Glasgow itself when touring Scotland in 1945. They also performed the ballet in Paris.

Bliss wrote the music in 1943 after his return from the United States. He created a concert suite from the ballet music, choosing seven of the fifteen numbers in the ballet, as well as the overture (The Street, The Girl Suicide, The Young Lovers, The Stranger, Dance of Deliverance, Intermezzo, Finale: The Killing of the Stranger).

Thanks to the efforts of David Drew, a dancer with the Royal Ballet for over 50 years, the ballet was revived in 2014 by the Birmingham Royal Ballet, under the direction of Gillian Lynne, a member of the original cast.

== Original cast ==
The ballet was first produced by the Sadler's Wells Ballet at the Prince's Theatre in London on Thursday, 26 October 1944. The choreography was by Robert Helpmann, who danced the lead role of the Stranger, and the music was conducted by Constant Lambert. The first cast was:

- Pauline Clayden (The Suicide)
- Moira Shearer and Alexis Rassine (The Lovers)
- Leslie Edwards (A Beggar)
- Gordon Hamilton (A Street Urchin)
- David Paltenghi (The Official)
- Celia Franca (The Prostitute)
- Robert Helpmann (The Stranger)

The corps (residents of the Gorbals) included Julia Farron, Moyra Fraser, Gerd Larsen, Gillian Lynne and Stanley Holden.

== Synopsis ==
The front cloth shows a rainswept ship in a dry dock with vast cranes in the background. The first scene in the slum is set in the afternoon, with a pub 'The Shamrock' on the left and on the right a fish and chip shop 'Mac's'; tenements crowd in on either side. Urchins are playing, but they run off when scolded by a minister. Evening approaches, and the prostitute comes out, and young men follow her around. The minister and the prostitute meet; he turns away and she goes into a doorway with a young man. A girl enters, but goes off after seeing a group of drunks. Two lovers come on and dance; the prostitute emerges and tries to entice the man, but the re-appearance of the minister foils her.

An old beggar and some children pass news around a gathering crowd; the minister faces the audience. Two men carry in the body of the suicide. The minister crosses her hands and the crowd feels the certainty of her death. A stranger enters, the crowd parts and he is left with the suicide's body. After he bends over the body, the girl rises, and she slowly warms to rebirth and starts dancing. The stranger is acclaimed, but the minister is disturbed, resentful of his loss of authority. The stranger blesses the crowd, and he leaves the scene with the revived girl.

The minister sends a child to spy on the stranger, when the prostitute walks by. The minister follows her up some stairs as she glories in her success. The people return to the street in excitement at the miracle. The minister comes back down the stairs, and the two lovers say good-night. The urchin brings news back to the minister, and the stranger is sent to the prostitute's room on a supposed mercy errand. The minister poisons the thoughts of the people, predicting that the stranger will emerge from the prostitute's room. Although initially stirred, the crowd are silent when the stranger re-emerges; only the beggar is aware of the plot and retreats to a doorway. After the stranger has left, the prostitute appears in a more lyrical frame of mind, as if having visions. The minister next summons a gang of thugs, who loiter in dark alleys. As the stranger comes back, he offers no resistance; they jostle him, slash him with knives and kick him to the ground, where the silence is broken by the sound of a distant ship siren. The minister realises the horror of what he has done. The beggar goes to help the stranger, and he is joined by the prostitute and the suicide, before the two women leave the beggar alone with the stranger.

== Recordings ==
- Philharmonia Orchestra / the composer, nine movements from the ballet, recorded January 1954 at the Kingsway Hall, for Columbia
- Bournemouth Symphony Orchestra / Paavo Berglund, 1976 (EMI) - ten movements from the ballet
- Queensland Symphony Orchestra / Christopher Lyndon-Gee, 1999 (Naxos) - complete ballet
- BBC Philharmonic Orchestra / Michael Seal, 2025 (Chandos) — complete ballet
