= Ernest Cable, 1st Baron Cable =

Indian businessman

The Right Honourable The Lord Cable
- Baron Cable in 1921
- Born: Ernest Cable; 1 December 1859; Calcutta, India
- Died: 28 March 1927 (aged 67); London, England
- Occupations: merchant and financier
- Title: 1st Baron Cable

Ernest Cable, 1st Baron Cable (1 December 1859 – 28 March 1927) was a British merchant and financier.

== Background ==
Born in Calcutta, he was the eldest son of George Hebberd Cable, a superintendent with the Indian Customs and Excise Service. His mother, Emily Maria, was the daughter of William Pickersgill, who had served in the Royal Navy. Cable was educated privately and at the University of Calcutta.

== Mercantile career ==
After his education Cable became first employed in Calcutta at Ashburner and Co and then worked for Lyall, Rennie and Co, both trading agencies. Aged seventeen he joined Bird and Co, a merchant house which had interests in many different areas of commerce, especially labour contracting (in which it had started), coal and jute.

In 1886, he became a partner in the company. By 1896 it directly employed 15,000 people and contracted 15,000 more. Much of this expansion was due to Cable's business acumen and his knowledge of India and good relations with its people. He also set up a subsidiary in the City of London to ease British investments in the company. By 1914 he was senior partner of the company. In 1917 Bird acquired a controlling interest in F. W. Heilgers and Co, another Calcutta merchant house, creating by far the largest company in India, employing 100,000 people.

Cable was also a director of the Western Assurance Company, the Tanganyika Development Company, and the British America Assurance Company.

== Political career ==
In 1903, Cable was elected president of the Bengal Chamber of Commerce and from then sat in the Imperial Legislative Council, headed by the Viceroy of India. He was nominated Sheriff of Calcutta in 1905 and during his tenure was knighted when George, Prince of Wales and his wife Mary of Teck visited the city in the following year.

After his return to England by 1913, Cable was invited into the Royal Commission on Indian Finance and Currency and in 1916 he was appointed High Sheriff of Devon. In the 1921 New Year's Honours he was raised to the Peerage of the United Kingdom with the title Baron Cable, of Ideford, in the County of Devon.

== Personal life ==
On 10 October 1888, he married Lilian Sarah, daughter of Weston Joseph Sparkes.

The couple had three daughters, Noorouz, Ruth and Dawn; and two sons, both named George. The first son died at or near birth and was buried on 6 February 1891 in Calcutta, Bengal, India. The second son was born on 5 December 1891 at Ideford. He was killed in action in the First World War in 1915.

His eldest daughter, Noorouz Weston Cable, married, first, Major Sir Lionel Cecil William Alexander, 6th Baronet, and, secondly, Michael Buller. His second daughter, Ruth McCarthy Cable, married businessman and public servant Sir Edward Benthall, who followed Lord Cable to Bird and Co. in India; she was the mother of the theatre director Michael Benthall.

Cable became a widower in 1924, dying three years later in London in 1927; he was buried in Ideford on 31 March. With his death, the barony became extinct.

A Junior Wing House at St Paul's School, Darjeeling, India, where all the houses bear names after colonial age figures, is named after him.

== Notes ==
Peerage of the United Kingdom
New creation	Baron Cable; 1921–1927	Extinct
