= Pamela May =

British dancer (1917–2005)

Pamela May OBE
- Pamela May c. 1947 as the Black Queen in the de Valois ballet Checkmate.
- Born: Doris May; 30 May 1917; San Fernando, Trinidad
- Died: 6 June 2005 (aged 88); Birmingham, England
- Education: Sadler's Wells Ballet School
- Occupations: Ballet dancer and teacher
- Years active: 1934–1982
- Employer: The Royal Ballet
- Known for: Classical Ballet
- Board member of: Royal Academy of Dance
- Spouses: Painton Cowan; Charles Gordon
- Children: 2

Pamela May OBE (30 May 1917 – 6 June 2005) was a Trinidad-born British dancer and teacher of classical ballet. Most noted as one of the earliest members of The Royal Ballet, she was regarded as a versatile dancer; dancing all the established 19th-century classical repertoire, and creating roles in new ballets by Ninette de Valois and Frederick Ashton. After retiring from professional ballet, she became a teacher at the Royal Ballet School, and also served as vice-president of the Royal Academy of Dance.

== Biography ==
Pamela May was born Doris May, in the city of San Fernando, Trinidad, on 30 May 1917. Her parents were British, but had moved to the Caribbean for the purposes of her father's work as an oil engineer. The family returned to London when May was four-years-old.

May began studying ballet with Freda Grant. At the age of 16, she progressed to the Sadler's Wells Ballet School, where she studied under the direction of Ninette de Valois. A year later in 1934, she made her debut with the Vic-Wells Ballet and was later contracted as a salaried member of the company. It was also around this time that she adopted the professional name Pamela May, after de Valois announced in rehearsal, that a role she was to perform could not be danced by someone named Doris. Her new name was printed in the programme for the ballet without her knowledge.

May performed as a principal dancer with the Royal Ballet until 1952. At that time she became a character dancer and continued performing with the company until she retired from the stage completely in 1982. After she retired as a principal dancer, de Valois invited May to become a teacher at the Royal Ballet School, a position which she held from 1954 until 1977.

== Created roles ==
- Checkmate - The Red Queen - Choreographed by: Ninette de Valois
- Les Patineurs - Girl in Red - Choreographed by: Frederick Ashton
- A Wedding Bouquet - Violet - Choreographed by: Frederick Ashton
- Horoscope - The Moon - Choreographed by: Frederick Ashton
- Dante Sonata - Untitled Role - Choreographed by: Frederick Ashton
- The Wanderer - Untitled Pas de Deux - Choreographed by: Frederick Ashton
- The Prospect Before Us - Mlle Théodore - Choreographed by: Ninette de Valois
- Orpheus and Eurydice - Eurydice - Choreographed by: Ninette de Valois
- Symphonic Variations - Untitled Role - Choreographed by: Frederick Ashton
- Don Quixote - Golden Age Pas de Deux - Choreographed by: Ninette de Valois
- Bonne-Bouche - The Mother - Choreographed by: John Cranko

== Awards ==
- Queen Elizabeth II Coronation Award - Awarded by the Royal Academy of Dance, 1976
- Officer of the Order of the British Empire - Appointed by Queen Elizabeth II, 1977

== Personal life ==
May married twice. Her first husband was Painton Cowan who she met at Cambridge. Painton was killed in action three weeks after their son was born.

Her second marriage was to Charles Gordon, whom she met whilst visiting Cambridge on tour with the Royal Ballet. Charles died on 6 June 2005 in Birmingham and they had a daughter.
