= Andrej Uspenski =

Russian ballet dancer and photographer

Andrej Uspenski is a Russian ballet dancer and photographer.

Uspenski was born in St Petersburg and trained at the Vaganova Academy of Russian Ballet, the Palucca School of Dance, Dresden, and the Berlin State Ballet School. Uspenski joined The Royal Ballet in 2002 and rose to first artist, before retiring as a dancer in 2015, due to injury.

During his dancing career, he often photographed dancers and rehearsals and after retirement was asked to become an in-house photographer for the Royal Ballet. His first exhibition, A Dancer's View, was in 28 April to May 2017 at the Old Truman Brewery. The Royal Academy held a Friends private view of the exhibition.

He has published several photography books Dancers: Behind the Scenes with The Royal Ballet (2013), Natalia Osipova: Becoming a Swan (2013) and Steven McRae: Dancer in the Fast Lane (2014). British Theatre Guide called Dancers: Behind the Scenes with The Royal Ballet "indispensable to balletomanes". The Lady wrote that "the pictures have a rare intimacy" and gave it 4/5 stars.

Ballet News in its review of Steven McRae: Dancer in the Fast Lane mentions "Uspenski’s considerable skill in capturing moments of art".

== Publications ==
- Dancers: Behind the Scenes at The Royal Ballet, Oberon Books, 2013
- Natalia Osipova: Becoming a Swan, 2013
- Steven McRae: Dancer in the Fast Lane, 2014

== Personal life ==
He had a relationship with Natalia Osipova.

In February 2018, Uspenski received a 12-month community order for "a campaign of harassment against an ex-girlfriend", ballet manager and former dancer Tatjana Novitjenko, including aggrieve messages, sending her a double-ended sex toy and a photo in which her Chihuahua appeared to be drowning in the Thames.
