= Arthur Bliss =

English composer and conductor (1891–1975)

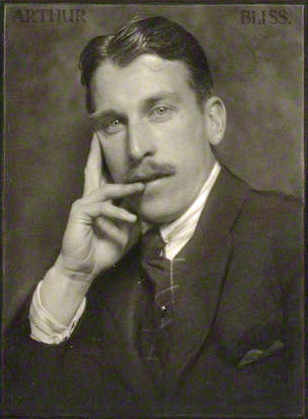
Arthur Bliss c. 1922 (photograph by Herbert Lambert)

Sir Arthur Edward Drummond Bliss (2 August 1891 – 27 March 1975) was a British composer and conductor. Bliss's musical training was cut short by the First World War, in which he served with distinction in the army. In the post-war years he quickly became known as an unconventional and modernist composer, but within the decade he began to display a more traditional and romantic side in his music. In the 1920s and 1930s he composed extensively not only for the concert hall, but also for films and ballet.

In the Second World War, Bliss returned to England from the US to work for the BBC and became its director of music. After the war he resumed his work as a composer, and was appointed Master of the Queen's Music.

In Bliss's later years, his work was respected but was thought old-fashioned, and it was eclipsed by the music of younger colleagues such as William Walton and Benjamin Britten. Since his death, his compositions have been well represented in recordings, and many of his better-known works remain in the repertoire of British orchestras.

== Biography ==
=== Early years ===
Diverse influences on the young Bliss: Elgar and Stravinsky (top); Vaughan Williams (lower left) and Ravel

Bliss was born in Barnes, a London suburb now, but then in Surrey, the eldest of three sons of Francis Edward Bliss (1847–1930), a businessman from Massachusetts, and his second wife, Agnes Kennard née Davis (1858–1895).

Agnes Bliss died in 1895, and the boys were brought up by their father, who instilled in them a love for the arts. Bliss was educated at Bilton Grange preparatory school, Rugby and Pembroke College, Cambridge, where he studied classics, but also took lessons in music from Charles Wood. Other influences on him during his Cambridge days were Edward Elgar, whose music made a lasting impression on him, and E.J. Dent.

Bliss graduated in classics and music in 1913 and then studied at the Royal College of Music in London for a year. At the RCM he found his composition tutor, Sir Charles Stanford, of little help to him, (Note: Bliss later made fun of Stanford's reactionary views in a lecture to the Royal Musical Association.) but found inspiration from Ralph Vaughan Williams and Gustav Holst and his fellow-students, Herbert Howells, Eugene Goossens and Arthur Benjamin.

In his brief time at the college, he got to know the music of the Second Viennese School and the repertory of Diaghilev's Ballets Russes, with music by modern composers such as Debussy, Ravel and Stravinsky.

When the First World War broke out, Bliss joined the army, and fought in France as an officer in the Royal Fusiliers until 1917 and then in the Grenadier Guards for the rest of the war. His bravery earned him a mention in despatches, and he was twice wounded and once gassed.

His younger brother, Kennard, was killed in the war, and his death affected Bliss deeply. The music scholar Byron Adams writes, "Despite the apparent heartiness and equilibrium of the composer's public persona, the emotional wounds inflicted by the war were deep and lasting." In 1918, Bliss converted to Roman Catholicism.

=== Early compositions ===
Bliss, caricatured in 1921 by F. Sancha

Although he had begun composing while still a schoolboy, Bliss later suppressed all his juvenilia, and, with the single exception of his 1916 Pastoral for clarinet and piano, reckoned the 1918 work Madam Noy as his first official composition. With the return of peace, his career took off rapidly as a composer of what were, for British audiences, startlingly new pieces, often for unusual ensembles, strongly influenced by Ravel, Stravinsky and the young French composers of Les Six. Among these are a concerto for wordless tenor voice, piano and strings (1920), (Note: Bliss later revised the work, dropping the vocal part.) and Rout for wordless soprano and chamber ensemble (subsequently revised for orchestra), which received a double encore at its first performance. (Note: The original version was for soprano, flute, clarinet, harp, string quartet, bass, glockenspiel, and side-drum, but Bliss later arranged it for full orchestra, in which form it was subsequently given as an interlude during the 1921 season of the Ballets Russes.)

In 1919, he arranged incidental music from Elizabethan sources for As You Like It at Stratford-on-Avon, and conducted a series of Sunday concerts at Lyric Theatre, Hammersmith, where he also conducted Pergolesi's opera La serva padrona. Viola Tree's production of The Tempest at the Aldwych Theatre in 1921, interspersed incidental music by Thomas Arne and Arthur Sullivan, with new music by Bliss for an ensemble of male voices, piano, trumpet, trombone, gongs and five percussionists dispersed through the theatre.

The Times wrote that "Bliss was acquiring a reputation as a tearaway" by the time he was commissioned, through Elgar's influence, to write a large-scale symphonic work (A Colour Symphony) for the Three Choirs Festival of 1922. The work was well received; in The Manchester Guardian, Samuel Langford called Bliss "far and away the cleverest writer among the English composers of our time"; The Times praised it highly (though doubting whether much was gained by the designation of the four movements as purple, red, blue and green) and commented that the symphony confirmed Bliss's transition from youthful experimenter to serious composer. After the third performance of the work, at the Queen's Hall under Sir Henry Wood, The Times wrote, "Continually changing patterns scintillate … till one is hypnotised by the ingenuity of the thing." Elgar, who attended the first performance, complained that the work was "disconcertingly modern."

In 1923 Bliss's father, who had remarried, decided to retire in the US. He and his wife settled in California. Bliss went with them and remained there for two years, working as a conductor, lecturer, pianist and occasional critic. While there he met Gertrude "Trudy" Hoffmann (1904–2008). They were married in 1925. The marriage was happy and lasted for the rest of Bliss's life; there were two daughters. Soon after the marriage, Bliss and his wife moved to England.

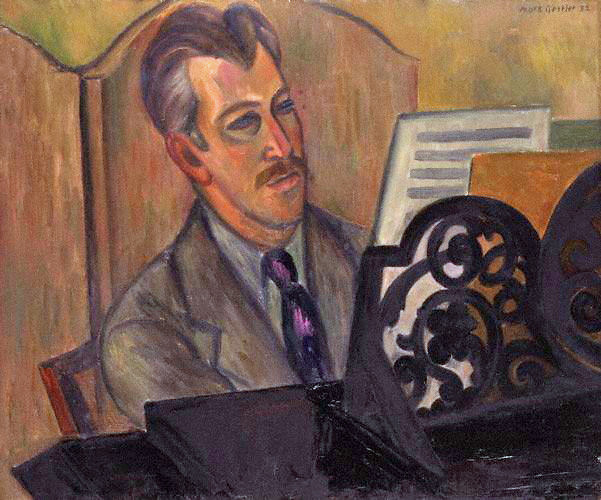
Bliss in 1932 by Mark Gertler

From the mid-1920s onwards Bliss moved more into the established English musical tradition, leaving behind the influence of Stravinsky and the French modernists, and in the words of the critic Frank Howes, "after early enthusiastic flirtations with aggressive modernism admitted to a romantic heart and [has] given rein to its less and less inhibited promptings" He wrote two major works with American orchestras in mind, the Introduction and Allegro (1926), dedicated to the Philadelphia Orchestra and Leopold Stokowski, and Hymn to Apollo (1926) for the Boston Symphony and Pierre Monteux.

Bliss began the 1930s with Pastoral (1930). In the same year he wrote Morning Heroes, a work for narrator, chorus and orchestra, written in the hope of exorcising the spectre of the First World War: "Although the war had been over for more than ten years, I was still troubled by frequent nightmares; they all took the same form. I was still there in the trenches with a few men; we knew the armistice had been signed, but we had been forgotten; so had a section of the Germans opposite. It was as though we were both doomed to fight on till extinction. I used to wake with horror."

During the decade Bliss wrote chamber works for leading soloists including a Clarinet Quintet for Frederick Thurston (1932) and a Viola Sonata for Lionel Tertis (1933). In 1935, in the words of the Grove Dictionary of Music and Musicians, "he firmly established his position as Elgar's natural successor with the Romantic, expansive and richly scored Music for Strings." Two dramatic works from this decade remain well known, the music for Alexander Korda's 1936 film of H. G. Wells's Things to Come, and a ballet score to his own scenario based on a chess game. Choreographed by Ninette de Valois, Checkmate was still in the repertoire of the Royal Ballet in 2011.

By the late 1930s, Bliss was no longer viewed as a modernist; the works of his juniors William Walton and the youthful Benjamin Britten were increasingly prominent, and Bliss's music began to seem old-fashioned. His last large-scale work of the 1930s was his Piano Concerto, composed for the pianist Solomon, who gave the world premiere at the World's Fair in New York in June 1939. Bliss and his family attended the performance and then stayed on in the US for a holiday. While they were there, the Second World War broke out. Bliss initially stayed in America, teaching at the University of California, Berkeley. He felt impelled to return to England to do what he could for the war effort, and in 1941, leaving his wife and children in California, he made the hazardous Atlantic crossing.

=== 1940s ===
At first, Bliss found little useful work to do in England. He joined the BBC's overseas music service in May 1941, but was plainly under-employed. He suggested to Sir Adrian Boult, who was at that time both the chief conductor of the BBC Symphony Orchestra and the BBC's director of music, that Boult should step down in his favour from the latter post. Bliss wrote to his wife: "I want more power as I have a lot to give which my comparatively minor post does not allow me to use fully." Boult agreed to the proposal, which freed him to concentrate on conducting. (Note: Boult later had cause to regret his generosity. After Bliss left, a director of music was appointed who had a grudge against Boult and engineered his compulsory retirement.) Bliss served as director of music at the BBC from 1942 to 1944, laying the foundations for the launch of the Third Programme after the war. During the war, he also served on the music committee of the British Council together with Vaughan Williams and William Walton.

In 1944, when Bliss's family returned from the US, he resigned from the BBC and returned to composing, having written nothing since his String Quartet in 1941. He composed more film music, and two ballets, Miracle in the Gorbals (1944), and Adam Zero (1946).

In 1948, Bliss turned his attention to opera, with The Olympians. He and the novelist and playwright J. B. Priestley had been friends for many years, and they agreed to collaborate on an opera, despite their lack of any operatic experience. Priestley's libretto was based on a legend that "the pagan deities, robbed of their divinity, became a troupe of itinerant players, wandering down the centuries". The opera portrays the confusion that results when the actors unexpectedly find themselves restored to deity. (Note: The similarity of Priestley's plot device to that of W. S. Gilbert's for Thespis was unremarked by the critics of The Times, The Manchester Guardian and The Observer.) The opera opened the 1949–50 Covent Garden season. It was directed by Peter Brook, with choreography by Frederick Ashton. The doyen of English music critics, Ernest Newman, praised it highly: "here is a composer with real talent for opera ... in Mr. Priestley he has been fortunate enough to find an English Boito", but generally it received a polite rather than a rapturous reception. Priestley attributed this to the failure of the conductor, Karl Rankl, to learn the music or to cooperate with Brook, and to lack of rehearsal of the last act. The critics attributed it to Priestley's inexperience as an opera librettist, and to the occasional lack of "the soaring tune for the human voice" in Bliss's music. After the Covent Garden run of ten performances, the company presented the work in Manchester, but did not revive it in subsequent years; it received a concert performance and broadcast in 1972.

=== Later years ===
In 1950, Bliss was knighted. After the death of Sir Arnold Bax he was appointed Master of the Queen's Music in 1953, to the relief of Walton, who feared he would be asked to take the post. In The Times, Howes commented, "The duties of a Master of the Queen's Music are what he chooses to make of them, but they include the composition of ceremonial and occasional music". Bliss, who composed quickly and with facility, was able to discharge the many duties of the post, providing music as required for state occasions, from the birth of a child to the Queen, to the funeral of Winston Churchill, to the investiture of the Prince of Wales. Howes commended Bliss's Processional for the 1953 coronation, and A Song of Welcome, Bliss's first official pièce d'occasion.

In 1956, Bliss headed the first delegation by British musicians to the Soviet Union since the end of the Second World War. The party included the violinist Alfredo Campoli, the oboist Léon Goossens, the soprano Jennifer Vyvyan, the conductor Clarence Raybould and the pianist Gerald Moore. Bliss returned to Moscow in 1958, as a member of the jury of the International Tchaikovsky Competition, with fellow jurors including Emil Gilels and Sviatoslav Richter.

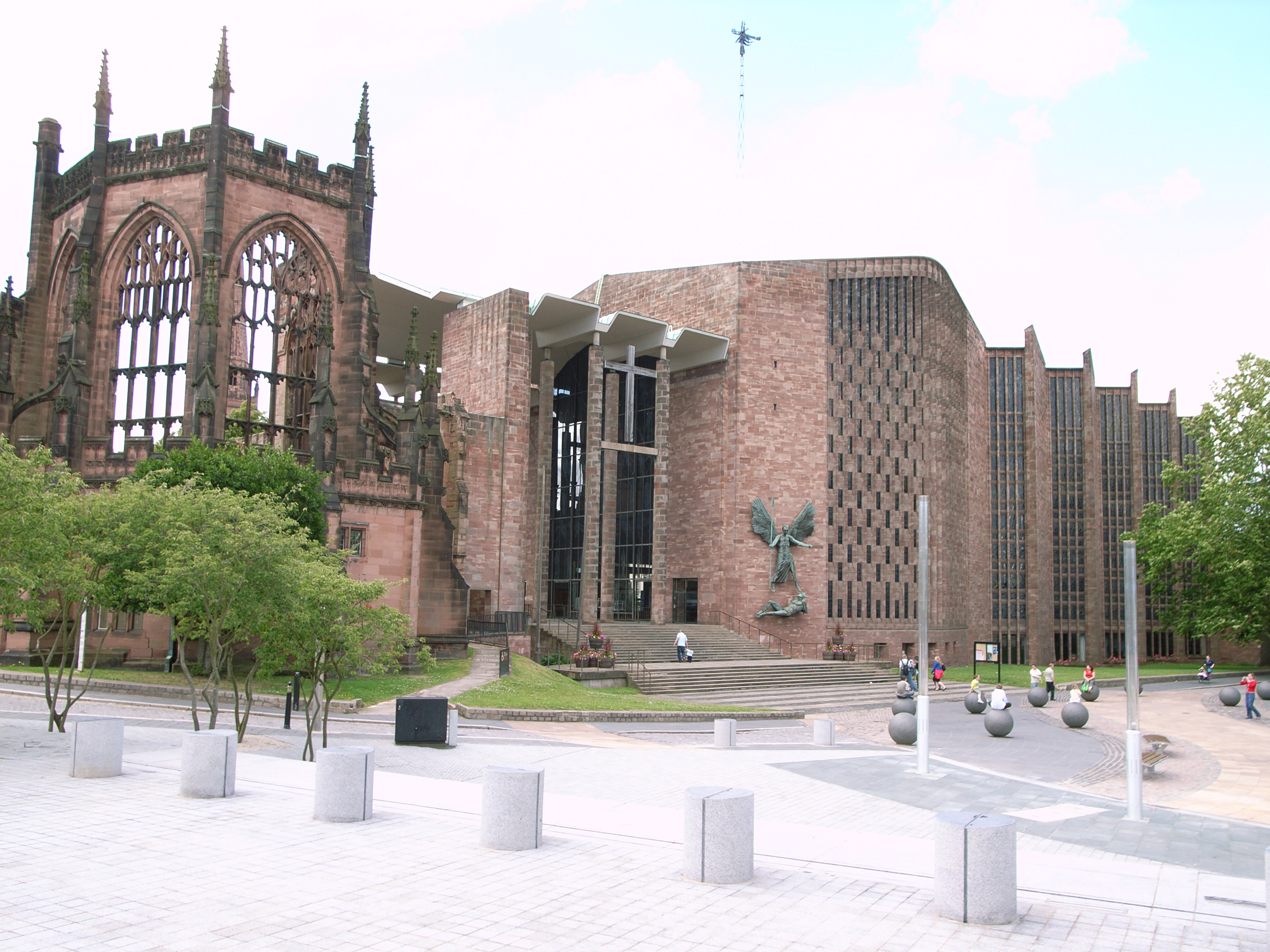
Coventry Cathedral for which Bliss composed The Beatitudes

In addition to his official functions, Bliss continued to compose steadily throughout the 1950s. His works from that decade include his Second String Quartet (1950); a scena, The Enchantress (1951), for the contralto Kathleen Ferrier; a Piano Sonata (1952); and a Violin Concerto (1955), for Campoli. The orchestral Meditations on a Theme by John Blow (1955) was a particularly deep-felt work, and Bliss regarded it highly among his output. In 1959–60 he collaborated with the librettist Christopher Hassall on an opera for television, based on the scriptural story of Tobias and the Angel. It won praise for the way in which Bliss and Hassall had understood and adapted to the more intimate medium of television, though some critics thought Bliss's music competent but unremarkable.

In 1961, Bliss and Hassall collaborated on a cantata, The Beatitudes, commissioned for the opening of the new Coventry Cathedral. Reviews were friendly, but the work has rarely been performed since, and has been eclipsed by another choral work written for Coventry at the same time, Britten's War Requiem. (Note: At 2011, there had been 11 recordings released of the Britten work; the Bliss work had received none.) Bliss followed this with two further large-scale choral works, Mary of Magdala (1962) and The Golden Cantata (1963).

Throughout his life, Bliss was vigilant on the state of music in Britain, about which he had written extensively since the 1920s. In 1969 he publicly censured the BBC for its plan to cut its classical music budget and disband several of its orchestras. He was delegated by his colleagues Walton, Britten, Peter Maxwell Davies and Richard Rodney Bennett to make a strong protest to William Glock, the BBC's controller of music. (Note: Of the six BBC orchestras under threat, three survived, but it is not known whether the composers' protests influenced the outcome.)

Bliss continued to compose into his eighth and ninth decades, in which his works included the Cello Concerto (1970) for Mstislav Rostropovich, the Metamorphic Variations for orchestra (1972), and a final cantata, Shield of Faith (1974), for soprano, baritone, chorus and organ, celebrating 500 years of St. George's Chapel, Windsor Castle, setting poems chosen from each of the five centuries of the chapel's existence.

Bliss died at his London home in 1975 at the age of 83. His wife Trudy outlived him by 33 years, dying in 2008 at the age of 104.

== Music ==
=== Early works ===
The musicologist Christopher Palmer was censorious of those who sought to characterise Bliss's music as "an early tendency to enfant terribilisme yielding very quickly to a compromise with the Establishment and a perpetuating of the Elgar tradition". Nonetheless, as a young man Bliss was certainly regarded as avant garde. Madam Noy, a "witchery" song, was first performed in June 1920. The lyric is by an anonymous author, and the setting is for soprano with flute, clarinet, bassoon, harp, viola, and bass. In a 1923 study of Bliss, Edwin Evans wrote that the piquant instrumental background to the gruesome story established the direction that Bliss was to take. The second Chamber Rhapsody (1919) is "an idyllic work for soprano, tenor, flute, cor anglais, and bass, the two voices vocalising on 'Ah' throughout, and being placed as instruments in the ensemble." Bliss contrasted the pastoral tone of that work with Rout (1920) an uproarious piece for soprano and instrumental ensemble; " the music conveys an impression such as one might gather at an open window at carnival time … the singer is given a series of meaningless syllables chosen for their phonetic effect". In his next work, Conversations for violin, viola, cello, flute and oboe (1921), Bliss chose a deliberately prosaic subject. It consists of five sections, entitled "Committee Meeting," "In the Wood," "In the Ball-room," "Soliloquy," and "In the Tube at Oxford Circus." Evans wrote of this work that although the instrumentation is ingenious, "much of [the] interest is polyphonic, especially in the first and last numbers."

Bliss followed these works with three compositions for larger forces, a Concerto (1920) and Two Orchestral Studies (1920). The Concerto, for piano, voice and orchestra, was experimental, and Bliss later revised it, removing the vocal part. The Melée Fantasque (1921) showed Bliss's skill in writing glittering orchestration.

=== Mature works ===
Of Bliss's early works, Rout is occasionally performed, and has been recorded, but the first of his works to enter the repertoire (at least in the UK) is the Colour Symphony. Each of the four movements represents a colour: "purple, the colour of amethysts, pageantry, royalty, and death; red, the colour of rubies, wine, revelry, furnaces, courage, and magic; blue, the colour of sapphires, deep water, skies, loyalty, and melancholy; and green, the colour of emeralds, hope, joy, youth, spring, and victory." The first and third are slow movements, the second a scherzo, and the fourth fugal, described by the Bliss specialist Andrew Burn as "a compositional tour de force, a superbly constructed double fugue, the initial subject slow and angular for strings, gradually becoming an Elgarian ceremonial march, the second a bubbling theme for winds." Burn observes that in three works written soon after his marriage, the Oboe Quintet (1927), Pastoral (1929) and Serenade (1929), "Bliss's voice assumed the mantle of maturity … all are imbued with a quality of contentment reflecting his serenity."

Of the works of Bliss's maturity, Burn comments that many of them were inspired by external stimuli. Some by the performers for whom they were written, such as the concertos for piano (1938), violin (1955) and cello (1970); some by literary and theatrical partners, such as the film music, ballets, cantatas and The Olympians; some by painters, such as the Serenade and the Metamorphic Variations; some by classical literature, such as Hymn to Apollo (1926), The Enchantress, and Pastoral. Of Bliss's works after the Second World War, his opera, The Olympians is generally considered a failure. The idiom was judged to be old-fashioned. A contemporary critic, in a broadly favourable review, wrote, "Bliss has wisely cleared his idiom of modern harmonic astringency. He uses quite a lot of common chords and progressions; in fact, he has gone back to the harmony of the musical gods. The result, inevitably, is a certain air of reminiscence."

Among the late works, the Cello Concerto is one of the more frequently played. When its dedicatee, Rostropovich, gave the first performance at the 1970 Aldeburgh Festival, Britten, who conducted the performance, regarded it as a major work and persuaded Bliss to change its title from "Concertino" to "Concerto". It is an approachable piece of which Bliss said "There are no problems for the listener – only for the soloist".

Both Palmer and Burn comment on a sinister vein that sometimes breaks out in Bliss's music, in passages such as the Interlude "Through the valley of the shadow of Death" in The Meditations on a Theme of John Blow, and the orchestral introduction to The Beatitudes. In Burn's words, such moments can be profoundly disquieting. Palmer comments that the musical forerunner of such passages is probably "the extraordinary spectral march-like irruption" in the Scherzo of Elgar's Second Symphony.

In a centenary assessment of Bliss's music, Burn singles out for mention "the youthful vigour of A Colour Symphony", "the poignant humanity of Morning Heroes", "the romantic lyricism of the Clarinet Quintet", "the drama of Checkmate, Miracle in the Gorbals and Things to Come", and "the spiritual probing of the Meditations on a Theme of John Blow and Shield of Faith." Other works of Bliss classed by Palmer as among the finest are the Introduction and Allegro, the Music for Strings, the Oboe Quintet, A Knot of Riddles and the Golden Cantata.

== Honours, legacy and reputation ==
In addition to his knighthood, Bliss was appointed KCVO (1969) and CH (1971). He received honorary degrees from the universities of Bristol, Cambridge, Edinburgh, Glasgow, Lancaster, and London, as well as from Princeton University. The London Symphony Orchestra appointed him its honorary President in 1958. (Note: The only other composers to hold this post were Walton (1948–1957) and Leonard Bernstein (1987–1990)) In 1963, he received the Gold Medal of the Royal Philharmonic Society.

Bliss's archive is kept at Cambridge University Library. There is an Arthur Bliss Road in Newport, an Arthur Bliss Gardens in Cheltenham and a block of flats, Sir Arthur Bliss Court, in Mitcham, South London.

The Arthur Bliss Society was founded in 2003 to further the knowledge and appreciation of Bliss's music. The society's website includes listings of forthcoming performances of Bliss's works; in March 2011 the following works were listed as scheduled for performance in the UK and U.S.: Ceremonial Prelude; Clarinet Quartet (2 performances); Four Songs for Voice, Violin and Piano; Music for Strings; Pastoral (Lie strewn the white flocks); Royal Fanfares; Seven American Poems; String Quartet No. 2 (5 performances); Things to Come Suite (2 performances); Things to Come March.

Many of Bliss's works have been recorded. He was a capable conductor, and was in charge of some of the recordings. The Library of Cambridge University maintains a complete Bliss discography. In March 2011 it contained details of 281 recordings: 120 orchestral, 56 chamber and instrumental, 58 choral and vocal, and 47 stage and screen works. Among the works that have received multiple recordings are A Colour Symphony (6 recordings); the Cello Concerto (6); the Piano Concerto (6); Music for Strings (7); the Oboe Quintet (7); the Viola Sonata (The violin sonata was first recorded in 2010) (7); and Checkmate (complete ballet and ballet suite (9)).

On receiving the Gold Medal of the Royal Philharmonic Society in 1963, Bliss said, "I don't claim to have done more than light a small taper at the shrine of music. I do not upbraid Fate for not having given me greater gifts. Endeavour has been the joy". A hundred years after Bliss's birth, Byron Adams wrote,

Of the smaller stars that shone in the ample firmament of twentieth-century English music, the light that coruscated with the greatest brilliance was Sir Arthur Bliss.

== See also ==
- Color symbolism

== Notes and references ==
Notes

== Sources ==
- Bliss, Arthur (1970). As I Remember. London: Faber and Faber. OCLC 656105053.
- Bliss, Arthur (1991). Roscow, Gregory (ed.). Bliss on Music: Selected Writings of Arthur Bliss, 1920–1975. Oxford: Oxford University Press. ISBN 978-0-19-816222-3.
- Haltrecht, Montagu (1975). The Quiet Showman – Sir David Webster and the Royal Opera House. London: Collins. ISBN 978-0-00-211163-8.
- Jacobs, Arthur (1994). Henry J. Wood: Maker of the Proms. London: Methuen. ISBN 978-0-413-69340-2.
- Kennedy, Michael (1987). Adrian Boult. London: Hamish Hamilton. ISBN 978-0-333-48752-5.
- Kennedy, Michael (1989). Portrait of Walton. Oxford: Oxford University Press. ISBN 978-0-19-816705-1.
- Rees, Terence (1964). Thespis. London: Dillon's University Bookshop. OCLC 5116329.

Court offices
Preceded by Sir Arnold Bax	Master of the Queen's Music; 1953–1975	Succeeded by Malcolm Williamson
