= Mise Éire (disambiguation) =

Mise Éire is a poem by Pádraic Pearse.

Mise Éire may also refer to:

- Mise Éire, a 1959 documentary film directed by George Morrison that tells the story of Irish revolutionary nationalism
  - Mise Éire, an album by Seán Ó Riada featuring the music he wrote for the soundtrack of the above-mentioned film
- A poem by the Irish poet Eavan Boland
