= The Sean-Bhean bhocht =

Traditional Irish song

"The Sean-Bhean bhocht" (pronounced [ˈʃanˠˌvʲanˠ ˈwɔxt̪ˠ]; Irish for "Poor old woman"), often spelled in English phonetics as "Shan Van Vocht", is a traditional Irish song from the period of the Irish Rebellion of 1798, and dating in particular to the lead up to a French expedition to Bantry Bay, that ultimately failed to get ashore in 1796.

The Sean-Bhean bhocht is used to personify Ireland, a poetic motif which heralds back to the aisling of native Irish language poetry.

Many different versions of the song have been composed by balladeers over the years, with the lyrics adapted to reflect the political climate at the time of composition. The title of the song, tune and narration of the misfortunes of the Shean Bhean bhocht remain a constant however, and this version, probably the best known, expresses confidence in the victory of the United Irishmen in the looming rebellion upon the arrival of French aid.

W. B. Yeats and Augusta, Lady Gregory based their 1902 nationalist play, Cathleen Ní Houlihan, on the legend dramatized in this song. A more recent version of the character is the speaker in Tommy Makem's "Four Green Fields," a song composed in the modern context of Northern Ireland's partition from the Republic of Ireland. The character also appears as the old lady selling milk in the opening passage of Ulysses by James Joyce.

== See also ==
- The Shan Van Vocht as the title of a late nineteenth century Irish nationalist novel and magazine.
- Mise Éire
- Róisín Dubh (song)
- Hibernia (personification)
- Kathleen Ni Houlihan
- Four Green Fields
