= Roy Noakes =

British artist (1936–2002)

- Noakes and his plaster Head of Alan Rawsthorne 1960s, private collection
- Born: 10 June 1936; Stepney, London
- Died: 9 February 2002 (aged 65)
- Education: City & Guilds of London Institute
- Known for: Sculpture

Roy Noakes (10 June 1936 – 9 February 2002) was a British portrait and figure sculptor. Noakes became a modeller by what was paradoxically the most efficient route - through his training as a carver. His achievement, driven by a refusal to be constrained by technique or bound by what he had learned, was based on his consummate skills as a craftsman.

Roy Noakes Sitting Figure plaster modelled in clay, 1.9m, c1960, private collection

== Biography ==
Noakes was born in Stepney in East London in 1936, and although as a dyslexic he was unresponsive to formal education in the local secondary school, he was encouraged to draw by his father (who died when Roy was twelve). He was apprenticed aged fifteen to a firm of monumental masons, Anselm Odling, and ‘learned to carve roses and angels’. He also attended evening drawing classes at the City & Guilds of London Institute in Kennington, where among the teachers was the sculptor Bernard Sindall. In 1962 Noakes was awarded a Beckwith Scholarship by the Worshipful Company of Fishmongers and travelled to Italy, where he studied the work of Giacomo Manzu and Medardo Rosso.

Noakes changed his indentures to Gerald Giudici, a master carver who executed large-scale public sculptures by Sir Charles Wheeler, Gilbert Ledward and James Woodford; at the end of a long tradition of figurative sculpture, these free-standing monuments and architectural reliefs represented for the ‘modernist’ Patrick Heron, ‘spurious sentiment and meaningless skill’. Noakes might have agreed, but the path he took in the 1960s related neither to the ‘abstraction’ of Anthony Caro, Phillip King or William Tucker, nor to the vestigial figurative tradition represented by John Davis or the mechanistics of George Fullard and Eduardo Paolozzi. Noakes embarked on a fascinating and important journey in a very different direction. He worked outside the mainstream or avant-garde cultural orthodoxies of his time, neither a brutalist, a conceptualist, nor involved with smooth or shiny surfaces that were barriers to expressing the dynamic potential of his materials.

After National Service in the Middle East, Noakes returned to study full-time at Kennington, from 1958 to 1962, making animated figures in a burst of creativity pent up during his enforced two-year absence. Subsequently his career can be seen in terms of evolving a personal expressive language through modelling. Noakes’s surfaces were active, not static. He aimed to breathe life into clay or bronze, to break down the distance between sculpture and the human form it signified, almost as though blood was coursing through its veins. In more than forty years of widely varied work, there is a common thread in that it all looks alive – spontaneous. However great was his struggle with intransigent substances, the viewer is not conscious of it.

The art world was in a rush in the 1960s, and with the privileging of ‘the new’. Innovations were confidently hyped that have proved alarmingly transient, the great ideas depressingly hollow. Noakes was too serious about exploring his ideas (as well as temperamentally indisposed) to court popularity. Fortunately, the core of his work remains to ensure that the art-historical record can now be put straight.

== Career ==
Roy Noakes Portrait – limestone carved limestone, 1960s, private collection

Noakes made a formal portrait bust of Sir Anthony Eden (1996) of which there are versions in the Houses of Parliament and the Foreign Office. Noakes' commissioned portraits of Bernard Miles and Alan Rawsthorne are in the collection of the National Portrait Gallery in London. Other notable portrait subjects included the artist Isabel Rawsthorne and the composer Malcolm Arnold.

== Bibliography ==
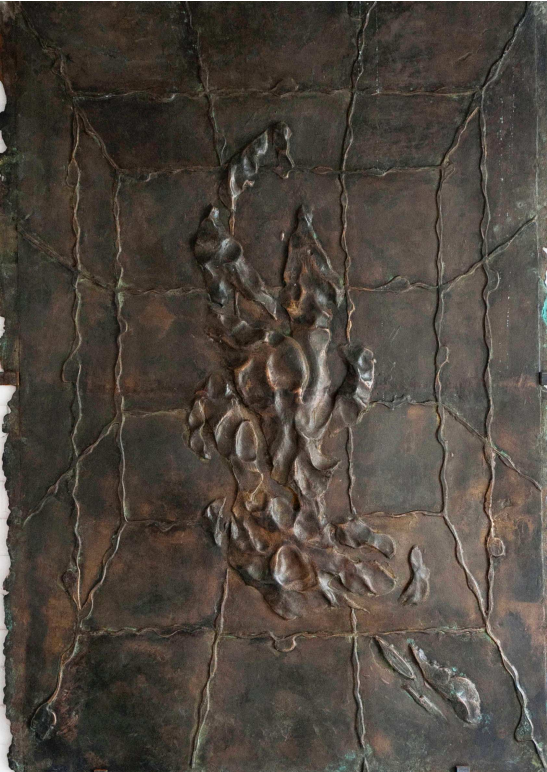
Roy Noakes Swimmer V life size bronze, 1980s, private collection

- Jack Lindsay Roy Noakes, The Archer Gallery 1975.
- David Thomson Roy Noakes Sculpture, October Gallery, 1989.
- Martin Harrison ‘Roy Noakes’ (2003) Roy Noakes Sculpture and Paper Works, Arts Council, 2009.

== Work in ==
- National Portrait Gallery
- Arts Council England
- Mercer Gallery Harrogate
- Royal Northern College of Music
- The House of Commons
- The Foreign Office
- Private collections
- Design Androcles and the Lion Mermaid Theatre, Oct. 3rd. 1961, directed Frank Dunlop
