= Tough Assignment =

1949 film by William Beaudine

- Directed by: William Beaudine
- Screenplay by: Miltan Luban
- Story by: Carl K. Hittleman
- Produced by: Carl K. Hittleman
- Starring: Don Barry; Marjorie Steele; Steve Brodie; Marc Lawrence
- Cinematography: Benjamin H. Kline
- Edited by: Harry W. Gerstad
- Music by: Albert Glasser
- Production company: Donald Barry Productions
- Distributed by: Lippert Pictures
- Release date: November 15, 1949
- Running time: 64 minutes
- Country: United States
- Language: English

Tough Assignment is a 1949 American crime film directed by William Beaudine and starring Don Barry, who also produced the film, with Marjorie Steele and Steve Brodie. It is regarded as a film noir.

== Plot ==
A Los Angeles reporter and his photographer wife investigate a criminal gang rustling cattle and trying to establish a cartel over beef supplies to the city's butcher shops.

== Cast ==
- Don Barry as Dan Reilly
- Marjorie Steele as Margie Reilly
- Steve Brodie as Boss Morgan
- Marc Lawrence as Vince
- Ben Welden as Sniffy
- Sid Melton as Herman
- John L. Cason as Joe
- Frank Richards as Steve
- Fred Kohler Jr. as Grant, Head Rancher
- Michael Whalen as Hutchison
- Edit Angold as Mrs. Schultz
- Leander De Cordova as Mr. Schultz
- Stanley Andrews as Chief Investigator Patterson
- Stanley Price as Al Foster
- Iris Adrian as Gloria
- Hugh Simpson as Ted
- Gayle Kellogg as Jack Lowery

== Bibliography ==
- Spicer, Andrew. Historical Dictionary of Film Noir. Scarecrow Press, 2010.
- Marshall, Wendy L. William Beaudine: From Silents to Television. Scarecrow Press, 2005.
