= Isabel Nicholas =

British painter, scenery and costume designer

- Photograph by John Deakin c.1966–67.
- Born: Isabel Nicholas; 10 July 1912; London, England, United Kingdom
- Died: 27 January 1992 (aged 79); Essex, England, United Kingdom
- Other names: Isabel Delmer; Isabel Lambert; Isabel Rawsthorne
- Education: Liverpool College of Art, Royal Academy
- Known for: painting, drawing and ballet/opera design
- Spouses: Sefton Delmer (m. 1936; div. 1947); Constant Lambert (m. 1947; died 1951); Alan Rawsthorne (m. 1955; died 1971)

Isabel Nicholas (10 July 1912 – 27 January 1992), also known at various times as Isabel Delmer, Isabel Lambert, and Isabel Rawsthorne was a British painter, scenery and costume designer, and occasional artists' model. During the Second World War she worked in black propaganda as part of the Special Operations Executive of British Intelligence. She was part of an artistic bohemian society that included Jacob Epstein, Alberto Giacometti and Francis Bacon.

== Early life and education ==
Untitled (Migrations), oil on canvas; 1970s

Isabel Nicholas was born in the East End of London, the daughter of a master mariner. She was raised in Liverpool and the Wirral. She studied at the Liverpool College of Art, won a scholarship to the Royal Academy in London and spent two years in the studio of the sculptor Jacob Epstein.

Rawsthorne's two years with Epstein and their mutual enthusiasm for Rodin developed her ideas about vitalism and movement, but she never became part of British neo-romanticism. She then moved to Paris, where she continued her studies of the nude at the liberal Académie de la Grande Chaumière. She associated with Giacometti, Tristan Tzara and the Surrealist circle, but was committed to a figurative form of modern art which she called 'Quintessentialism'. She maintained connections to an alternative circle of representational artists including Francis Gruber and Peter Rose Pulham, as well as Balthus and Derain. Her outlook was anti-idealist, intellectual and, like Giacometti, she saw painting from the real world as a challenge that could never be fully met.

== Career ==
Rawsthorne's work primarily featured paintings of figures and animals. Her father supplied exotic creatures to British zoos, and, as a child, she took to drawing these and other wildlife. Later she became interested in natural history and new ideas in Anthropology, Ecology and Ethology, such as those of her friends Michel Leiris and Georges Bataille. These inform the skeletal bird, fish and bat figures of her 1949 Hanover Gallery show, the haunting ape series, and her last, large Migration pictures.

Rawsthorne became involved with Alberto Giacometti. They shared many ideas and a commitment to a modern form of representational painting.

During the Italian Campaign, she edited the magazine Il Mondo Libero.

During the 1940s, Rawsthorne adapted animal, archaic and pre-historic imagery into motifs of birth, sexuality and death. She did not share the fashionable interest in the formal properties of Oceanic or Archaic art. Instead, she investigated the uncanny 'presence' achieved by ancient figures, especially Egyptian sculpture. She also studied this quality in Early Renaissance paintings, and in the evidence of the body itself, X-rays, skeletons, figures and animals she found in the countryside or drew in London Zoo.

From 1949, she and Bacon showcased their figurative brand of modern art at the Hanover Gallery, and she exhibited in group shows organised by the ICA and the British Council. She began a career as a designer for the Royal Ballet and the opera at Covent Garden and Sadler's Wells.

In the 1950s and '60s, her explorations of the embattled origins of art and life were adapted into designs for the ballet and opera, such as a Minoan Tiresias created for the ballet. An opera of the same name premiered in 1951 at Covent Garden, featuring the last work of her husband Constant Lambert. She continued her studies of the body, in motion this time, in the practice rooms of the Royal Ballet. Over the next twenty years, she painted images of Fonteyn, Rudolph Nureyev, Antoinette Sibley and other dancers which developed a vivacious new language of movement.

From the 1950s onwards, she developed a series of paintings based on the Essex countryside. Existential rather than pastoral, they responded to environmentalist publications such as Rachel Carson's Silent Spring.

In 1961, she worked from the figure and landscape in Nigeria shortly after its Independence, at the Zaria Art School with the artist Clifford Frith (grandson of William Powell Frith).

Rawsthorne explored the ambiguities of appearance through the theme of the double – for instance, reflections, such as those seen in the practice room mirrors. During the late 1960s and '70s, the deaths of Giacometti and her third husband, Alan Rawsthorne, prompted her to refine these ideas in a set of ethereal double portraits juxtaposing living, dead and sculpted likenesses. These works returned to the matière relief effects of the early 1950s and exchanged ideas with Bacon and the sculptor Roy Noakes. Some of these new works and a selection of her innovative dancers were presented to the public at the Marlborough Gallery in 1968.

The last of her series of paintings based on the Essex countryside, Migrations, embedded bird and animal motifs in timeless settings. Swathes of yellow evoke the deserts of pre-history and post-history, as well as the very immediate issue of the fields of oil seed rape that were appearing in the 1970s.

In later life, widely read biographies of Giacometti and Bacon brought Rawsthorne fame as a model and muse, but unfortunately had the effect of obscuring her main profession. By the 1980s, she was better known as a once beautiful siren, or the bon viveur that Bacon partied with and painted as 'Isabel Rawsthorne'. Since her death, however, serious scholarship has ensued, several paintings have entered public collections and retrospectives have been exhibited. It is believed that Rawsthorne's last work was Sparrowhawk, which was found on her easel after her death.

== Exhibitions ==
- Isabel Nicholas: Animal Studies, Arnold Haskell's Valenza Gallery, London, 1933
- Watercolours by Paul Nash, Frank Dobson, P.H. Jowett, Adrian Allinson, Isabel Nicholas, Redfern Gallery, London, 1934
- Isabel Lambert: Recent Paintings, Hanover Gallery, London, 1949
- London-Paris (New Trends in Paintings and Sculpture), Institute of Contemporary Arts, London, 1950, 1955
- Isabel Lambert, Michael Ayrton, Milan, 1950
- Exhibition of Drawings, Institute of Contemporary Arts, London, 1951
- Recent Trends in Realist Painting, Institute of Contemporary Arts, London, 1952
- Exhibition of Paintings, Institute of Contemporary Arts, London, 1954
- Contemporary English Theatre Design, Arts Council of Great Britain, 1957
- Isabel Lambert - Recent Paintings, Hanover Gallery, London, 1959
- Three Stage Designers: Leslie Hurry, Isabel Lambert, Sophie Fedorovitch, Arts Council of Great Britain, 1963/64
- Dancers of the Royal Ballet: An Exhibition of Drawings and Gouaches by Isabel Lambert, Mermaid Theatre, London, 1966, Arts Council Gallery, Cambridge, 1967
- Isabel Lambert, Marlborough Fine Art, London, 1968
- Isabel Lambert: Exhibition of Work, Framlingham Art Gallery, Suffolk, 1974
- Isabel Lambert: Dancers in Action. Drawings, paintings, stage designs, October Gallery, London, 1986
- Exhibition of work, Fry Art Gallery, Saffron Walden, 1990
- Isabel Rawsthorne 1912–1992 A Memorial Retrospective, Woods Gallery, Leicester, 1992
- Isabel Rawsthorne 1912–1992 Paintings, Drawings and Designs, Mercer Art Gallery/October Gallery 1997-98
- Isabel Rawsthorne: Natural History, Oxford University Museum of Natural History, 1998–1999
- Transition: The London Art Scene in the Fifties, Barbican Art Gallery, 2002
- Epstein and Isabel: Artist and Muse, Harewood House, 2008.
- Friends and Lovers, Number 3, The Old Workhouse, Pateley Bridge, 2008-9
- Alberto Giacometti "Die Frau auf dem Wagen" Triumph und Tod, Lehmbruck Museum, Duisburg, 2010
- Migration, The Old Workhouse, Pateley Bridge, 2010
- Isabel Rawsthorne: Moving Bodies, The New Art Gallery Walsall, 2012
- Alberto Giacometti and Isabel Rawsthorne, a Conversation, Tate Britain, 2022
- The Many Sides of Isabel Rawsthorne: the story of a local and international artist, Fry Art Gallery, 2022

== Theatre design ==
- Tiresias, Sadler's Wells Ballet, 1951
- Elektra, Sadler's Wells Opera, 1953
- Blood Wedding, Sadler's Wells Ballet, 1953
- Coppélia, Sadler's Wells Ballet, 1953
- Life's a Dream, The Group Theatre, 1953
- Madame Chrysanthème, Sadler's Wells Ballet, 1955
- Jabez and the Devil, The Royal Ballet, 1961

== Personal life ==
Isabel Nicholas by Roy Noakes

She was the mother of Epstein's son Jackie (born 1934), and briefly assumed the name "Margaret Epstein" (the name of Epstein's wife) in order to register Jackie's birth.

Rawsthorne's first show was a sell-out, and, by September 1934, she was living in Paris. She worked with André Derain, and lived and travelled for a time with Balthus and his wife. She was painted several times by Derain and Pablo Picasso. In 1936, she married her first husband, the foreign correspondent for the Daily Express, Sefton Delmer.

The onset of the Second World War forced Rawsthorne to leave Paris. She relinquished at least one ticket out and did not flee until the day the Germans arrived on 14 June 1940.

She remained with Delmer for the war, but they divorced in 1947. She maintained indirect links with France by working in intelligence and black propaganda for the Political Warfare Executive.

Around 1943, she encountered Francis Bacon within the arty set around the BBC, although they probably did not become intimate until a few years later. Rawsthorne's closest wartime friends appear to have been John Rayner (typographer, journalist and soldier (SOE), the photographer Joan Leigh Fermor (then Rayner), the Schiaparelli model Anna Phillips, and the composer Elisabeth Lutyens, but her social life encompassed many others including the poets Louis MacNeice and Dylan Thomas (she shared working quarters with Thomas), Ian Fleming, and old friends from Paris, Peter Rose Pulham, Peter Watson (editor of the journal Horizon) and the spy Donald Maclean.

Returning to Paris in 1945, Rawsthorne was re-united with Giacometti and lived with him for a short while, but they never married. She continued to be involved in the evolution of the figurative style associated with Existentialism. She socialised with Simone de Beauvoir, Jean-Paul Sartre, Jean Wahl and other intellectuals, and for a time lived a few doors away from the headquarters of the journal Les Temps Modernes. She also entertained the philosopher A. J. Ayer in Paris, saw Eduardo Paolozzi and Bacon, and had relationships with Georges Bataille and the composer René Leibowitz. In the winter of 1946/47 she withdrew to modest lodgings in the Indre to work alone. The composer Constant Lambert visited her in 1947 and they married later that year.

Following her second marriage, her base became London. Her art world associates, including Bacon and Lucian Freud, created a potent mix with a glitzier musical set, including the Sitwells, Lutyens, Frederick Ashton, Margot Fonteyn and Alan Rawsthorne.

Lambert died in 1951 and Rawsthorne returned to Paris to paint. She continued to see Giacometti, but eventually married Alan Rawsthorne in 1951. They moved to a thatched cottage in rural Essex with a purpose built studio, near friends such as the politician Tom Driberg, poet Randall Swingler, artists Michael Ayrton and Biddy and Roy Noakes; Bacon had a house not far away. Six of Bacon's portraits of Rawsthorne were shown in his 1967 show, including Portrait of Isabel Rawsthorne. In all, between 1964 and 1970 he painted 14 images of her, including five triptychs. Giacometti died in 1966, Alan Rawsthorne in 1971, and Isabel Rawsthorne in 1992; Bacon outlived her by a few months. Apart from visits to London and Paris, Africa, Greece and Australia, and a short period in Cambridge (1972-3), she lived in the cottage for forty years - half of her life. She raised geese, a nod to her interest in Konrad Lorenz, and became involved in the emergent environmentalist movement. She and her last husband are buried in Thaxted churchyard.
