= Tiresias (ballet) =

Tiresias is a ballet in a prelude and three acts choreographed by Frederick Ashton to an original score by Constant Lambert. With scenery and costumes designed by the composer's wife Isabel Lambert, it was first presented by the Royal Ballet at the Royal Opera House Covent Garden, London, on 9 July 1951.

== Background ==
The idea of a ballet on the subject of the Greek seer who changes sex was first considered by Lambert in the 1930s. Lambert started composing the score in Paris, but due to the distractions of other work he had to enlist assistance for the orchestration from younger colleagues, such as Robert Irving, Humphrey Searle, Gordon Jacob, Alan Rawsthorne and Elisabeth Lutyens.

One of three ballets commissioned for the Festival of Britain, Lambert's score is roughly contemporary with French composer Francis Poulenc's short comic opera Les mamelles de Tirésias first performed at the Opéra-Comique in 1947, on a similar sex-change theme, based on Guillaume Apollinaire's surrealist text of 1917.

The premiere was conducted by the composer and given in the presence of Queen Elizabeth The Queen Mother. The critical reception was generally negative, and the composer instructed solicitors to challenge the hostile review by Richard Buckle, which cast aspersions on the entire artistic leadership of the Royal Ballet company. Lambert died six weeks after its premiere.

There were 12 London performances in 1951, then ten the following year, seven in 1953, three in 1954 and two in the next season. The work was performed at the Edinburgh Festival in 1951, in Paris (September 1954) as part of an exchange agreement with Opera de Paris, and in New York in September 1955. The New York Times review, headlined "Superb 'Tiresias'", was stronger than any of the UK reviews.

Alan Rawsthorne's orchestral Improvisations on a Theme of Constant Lambert (1960) uses the opening fanfare from Tiresias as its theme.

== Original cast ==
- Tiresias (male) – Michael Somes
- Tiresias (female) – Margot Fonteyn
- Her lover – John Field
- Neophyte – Margaret Dale
- Snakes – Pauline Clayden, Brian Shaw
- Zeus - Alfred Rodriguez

== Synopsis ==
Tiresias enters on a scene of young girls engaged in vaulting over the horn of bull. After a solo and a dance for Tiresias and male corps de ballet, priestesses and a young virgin come on the scene. The Neophyte gives him a wand and departs. Tiresias spots two snakes copulating and in a rage he strikes the female snake with his staff and is thus changed into a woman.

Following a pastoral interlude, shepherds and shepherdesses enter and dance with Tiresias. Her lover appears, and they dance a climactic pas de deux. Then there is a bacchanale celebrating their happiness, at the end of which two snakes enters, engaged as before. Tiresias strikes the male snake with her staff, and is restored to his original self.

Another interlude transforms the scene to a palace courtyard where Zeus and Hera are arguing whether men or women get most pleasure in sex. Called to be judge Tiresias declares that women do, and Hera angrily blinds him, but Zeus bestows the gift of prophecy on Tiresias and he departs.

== Recordings ==
The first broadcast performance of Tiresias, using the score edited by John Abbott, took place on 8 November 1995 with the BBC Concert Orchestra conducted by Barry Wordsworth. In April 1998 a recording of the score was made by the English Northern Philharmonia conducted by David Lloyd-Jones, and issued by Hyperion Records the following year on CD, coupled with the Pomona ballet music by Lambert. The CD booklet cover uses one of Isabel Lambert's designs for Act 1.
