= Four Green Fields =

1967 Irish folk song by Tommy Makem

"Four Green Fields" is a 1967 folk song by Irish musician Tommy Makem, described in The New York Times as a "hallowed Irish leave-us-alone-with-our-beauty ballad." Of Makem's many compositions, it has become the most familiar, and is part of the common repertoire of Irish folk musicians.

== Content and meaning ==
The song is about Ireland (personified as an “old woman”) and its four provinces (represented by “green fields”), one of which remains occupied (“taken”) by the British (the “strangers”) despite the best efforts of the Irish people (her “sons”), who died trying to defend them. Its middle stanza is a description of the violence and deprivation experienced by the Irish, including the people in Northern Ireland. At the end of the song, one of her fields still shows the promise of new growth:

"But my sons have sons, as brave as were their fathers;
My fourth green field will bloom once again," said she.

The song is interpreted as an allegorical political statement regarding the constitutional status of Northern Ireland. The four fields are seen as the Provinces of Ireland with Ulster being the "field" that remained part of the United Kingdom after the Irish Free State separated. The old woman is seen as a traditional personification of Ireland herself (see Kathleen Ni Houlihan). The words spoken by the woman in Makem's song are taken directly from Cathleen ni Houlihan, an early play by W. B. Yeats.

== Background ==
The concept of Four Green Fields representing the four provinces of Ireland had been used before, in the 1939 stained glass work My Four Green Fields by Evie Hone.

Makem frequently described the song as having been inspired by a drive through the "no man's land" adjoining Northern Ireland, where he saw an old woman tending livestock. She was oblivious to the political boundaries that loomed so large in the public's eye; the land was older than the argument, and she didn't care what was shown on the map.

Makem commonly sang the song as an encore.

== See also ==
- Kathleen Ni Houlihan
- Mise Éire
- Róisín Dubh (song)
- The Sean-Bhean bhocht
- Hibernia (personification)
