= Pauline Clayden =

British ballerina (1922–2026)

Pauline Clayden with Robert Helpmann in the 1944 Sadler's Wells Ballet production of Miracle in the Gorbals

Pauline Elsie Clayden (12 October 1922 – 21 July 2026) was a British ballerina.

== Life and career ==
Pauline Elsie Clayden was born in Lewisham, London, England, on 12 October 1922. She studied at the Cone School of Dancing. Peggy van Praagh saw her among the Cone School's students and recommended her to Antony Tudor's London Ballet. Tudor chose her over some of the Cone teachers' own favourites. He cast her in a dance for four women in a Covent Garden production of Aida. This was the only time she worked with him; shortly afterwards he left for the United States. She moved on to the Ballet Rambert and, finally, as a soloist with Sadler's Wells Ballet from 1942 to 1956.

She married Major H. J. Gamble in 1948. She created roles in Ninette de Valois's Promenade, Robert Helpmann's Miracle in the Gorbals, Frederick Ashton's Tiresias and Cinderella, John Cranko's Bonne-Bouche and Andrée Howard's Veneziana. She also danced many of the roles originally created for Margot Fonteyn.

Clayden died in Salisbury, England, on 21 July 2026, at the age of 103.
