= Africa Research Bulletin =

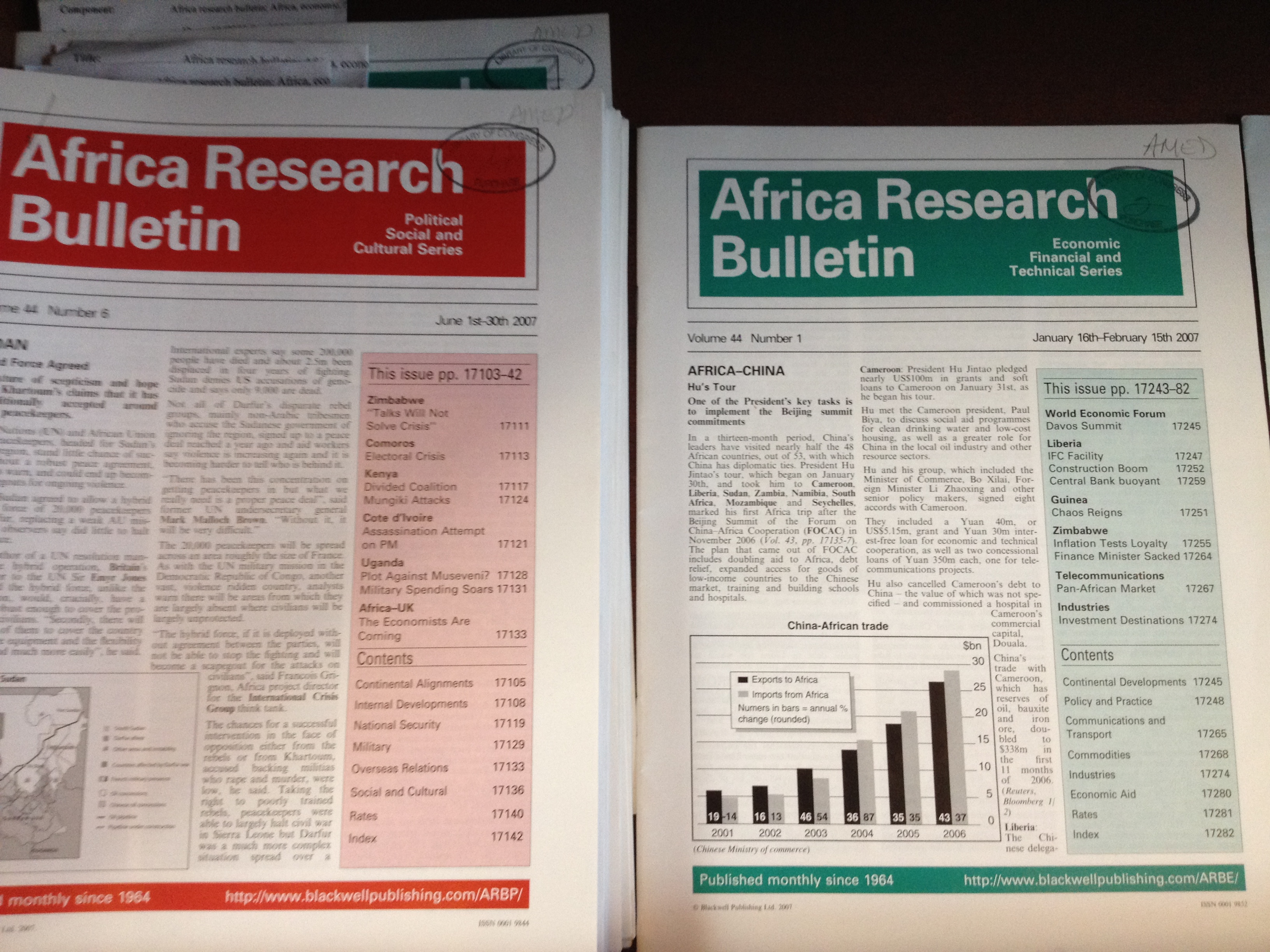
- Discipline: African studies, economy, sociology
- Language: English
- Edited by: Veronica Hoskins

Publication details
- History: 1964–present
- Publisher: Wiley-Blackwell (United Kingdom)
- Frequency: Monthly

Standard abbreviations
- ISO 4: Afr. Res. Bull.

Indexing
- Economic, Financial and Technical Series
- ISSN: 0001-9852 (print); 1467-6346 (web)
- Political, Social and Cultural Series
- ISSN: 0001-9844 (print); 1467-825X (web)

Links
- Journal homepage

The Africa Research Bulletin is a peer-reviewed academic journal, appearing in two series - Political, Social and Cultural Series, and Economic, Financial and Technical Series. The journal was founded in 1964 by John Drysdale, a former British diplomat and historian, who also established its sister publication, the Asia Research Bulletin.
