= Louis FitzGibbon =

- Born: 6 January 1925; London, United Kingdom
- Died: 31 January 2003 (aged 78)
- Notable work: Katyn: A Crime without Parallel (1971); The Betrayal of the Somalis (1982)
- Honours: Gold Cross of Merit (Poland); Knight Commander of Order of Polonia Restituta; Order of Merit of the Federal Republic of Germany

Louis Theobald Dillon FitzGibbon (6 January 1925 - 31 January 2003) was a British naval officer, businessman and writer who was renowned for championing the plight of the Somali and Polish people. FitzGibbon served as the General Secretary of the British Council for Aid to Refugees and most notably is credited with forcing the Russian government to admit to the 1940 Katyn Massacre in Poland.

== Early life ==
Louis FitzGibbon was born in London on 6 January 1925. He was the son of Commander Francis Lee-Dillon FitzGibbon, a distinguished naval officer. Constantine FitzGibbon, a noted author, stands as his paternal half-sibling. FitzGibbon's formative educational years were spent at St. Augustine's Abbey School located in Ramsgate. From there he pursued a career in the British Navy at 13 years old, enrolling in the esteemed Britannia Royal Naval College in Dartmouth during 1938.

=== Naval service ===
By 1942, he had ascended to the position of midshipman aboard the battleship HMS Malaya. He subsequently served on a frigate, as well as trained at the naval artillery institution, HMS Excellent. In the year 1944, FitzGibbon volunteered for submarine service, during which he was stationed in both HMS Safari and HMS Volatile for the remainder of World War II. As the war reached its end, he was tasked with the responsibility of travelling to Germany to oversee the retrieval of the German submarine U-1171, a sophisticated model of submarine technology, intended for British evaluation trials. In the post-war era, starting in 1945, FitzGibbon was assigned to serve aboard submarines HMS Artful, HMS Anchorite, and HMS Totem. By 1950, he transitioned to general service aboard the cruiser, HMS Bermuda. Notably, among his myriad maritime duties, he held command over a tank landing craft.

A pivotal juncture in his naval career transpired between the years 1950 and 1952, during which he underwent rigorous training to become proficient as a Polish interpreter. This linguistic expertise would later serve as a crucial asset in his later investigative endeavors regarding the Katyn massacres. Concluding his career, Mr. FitzGibbon resigned from the Royal Navy in 1954. Subsequent to his military service, he went into business and embraced a directorial role at De Leon Properties, a tenure that lasted until 1972.

== Writing career ==
=== Katyn massacre ===
FitzGibbon learned about the Katyn massacre in 1969 from the widows of the victims. He came to be known as "one of the most aggressive British voices" on behalf of Poland.

In 1971, he wrote a book titled Katyn: A Crime without Parallel. In this book, he argued that Russia was responsible for the killings, even though at the time, Russia claimed the Germans did it in 1941. That same year, FitzGibbon started the Katyn Memorial Fund to make a monument for the victims and managed it for six years. He kept writing about the Katyn issue in books such as The Katyn Cover Up (1972), Unpitied and Unknown (1975), and Katyn: Triumph of Evil (1975). Russia did not admit their guilt until the late 1980s during Glasnost. FitzGibbon's efforts led to a black stone monument being put up in West London in 1976 with the words "Katyn 1940."

=== Somalia and Africa ===
He soon began focusing on Somali issues, with a significant emphasis on what he considered to be the unjust Ethiopian military occupation of the Somali inhabited Ogaden region. It has been suggested that his strong pro-Somali views, along with personal access to Margaret Thatcher affected the British government's policy towards the Derg government of Ethiopia during the late 1980s.

From 1968 to 1972, FitzGibbon worked as the General Secretary of the British Council for Aid to Refugees. He also undertook numerous missions in East Africa for the United Nations High Commissioner for Refugees . In 1981, he got an award for helping with human rights issues in Somalia and wrote a book about it called The Betrayal of the Somalis in 1982 and The Evaded Duty in 1985. He wrote more books about the region throughout the 1980s and worked as a secretary for the Horn of Africa and Aden Council from 1984 to 1992.

== Awards ==
The Polish Government-in-Exile honored him with the Gold Cross of Merit in 1969. In 1976, he was named a Knight Commander of the Order of Polonia Restituta. Germany and the Netherlands also gave him awards.

== Later life and death ==
FitzGibbon settled in Brighton where he was a campaigner on a number of issues affecting conservation and the South Coast. He was three times married and survived by a son and two daughters from his second marriage. He died on 31 January 2003.

== See also ==
- John Drysdale
- I.M. Lewis
