= Constantine FitzGibbon =

Irish-British historian, translator and novelist

Major Constantine FitzGibbon RSL
- Born: Robert Louis Constantine Lee-Dillon FitzGibbon; 8 June 1919; United States
- Died: 25 March 1983 (aged 63); Dublin, Ireland
- Education: Wellington College; Ludwig-Maximilians-Universität München; University of Paris
- Alma mater: Exeter College, Oxford
- Spouses: Margaret Aye Moung (m. 1939; div. 1944) Theodora Rosling (m. 1944; div. 1960) Marion Gutmann (m. 1960; div. 1965) Marjorie Steele (m. 1967)
- Children: 3
- Parent(s): Francis Lee-Dillon FitzGibbon; Georgette Folsom

Major Robert Louis Constantine Lee-Dillon FitzGibbon RSL (8 June 1919 – 25 March 1983) was an American-born Irish-British historian, translator and novelist.

== Early life ==
FitzGibbon was born in the United States in 1919, the youngest of four surviving children. His father, Commander Robert Francis Lee-Dillon FitzGibbon (1884–1954), RN, was Irish, and his mother, Georgette Folsom (1883–1972), daughter of George Winthrop Folsom, was an American heiress from Lenox, Massachusetts. Before his parents divorced in 1923, they had four surviving children, Frances Geraldine (wife of Harry Morton Colvile), Fannie Hastings, Georgette Winifred (wife of Claude Mounsey), and Constantine. From his father's later marriage to Kathleen Clare Aitchison, he was a half-brother of Louis FitzGibbon, author of a number of works about the Katyn massacre of Polish officers in 1940, by Soviet troops. In 1927, his mother married her second cousin, Bertram Winthrop (a nephew of Egerton Leigh Winthrop and cousin to Bronson Winthrop). They also divorced in 1931.

The family were descended from John "Black Jack" FitzGibbon, the 1st Earl of Clare, who was Lord Chancellor of Ireland and effected the Act of Union between Ireland and England in 1800, but in the following century the family faded into obscurity and the title died out. Constantine FitzGibbon's grandmother, Louisa, was daughter of Richard Hobart FitzGibbon, the third and last Earl; her husband, Capt. Gerald Normanby Dillon (sixth son of Henry Dillon, 13th Viscount Dillon), changed his name to FitzGibbon, so the name could continue. His maternal great-grandfather was George Folsom, the U.S. Chargé d'affaires to the Netherlands from 1850 to 1853.

He was brought up in the United States and France before moving to England with his mother, his parents having divorced when he was very young.

=== Education ===
FitzGibbon was educated at Wellington College, Berkshire, a British public (i.e. private) school with military affiliations, which he detested. He left aged 16 and travelled independently in Europe, where he studied at the Ludwig-Maximilians-Universität München and the University of Paris, becoming fluent in French and German and acquiring a sound knowledge of their literatures.

He won a scholarship to Exeter College, Oxford to read modern languages in 1937, but left in May 1940, after the fall of France, to join the army. He did not complete his degree before the war and chose not to return to Oxford afterwards. One of his best novels, The Golden Age (1976), set in a post-apocalyptic future Oxford, is by turns wistful and sardonic about the university.

== Career ==
=== World War II service ===
FitzGibbon served as an officer in the Oxfordshire and Buckinghamshire Light Infantry (the 'Ox & Bucks') regiment of the British Army, from 1940 to 1942. As a US citizen he transferred to the United States Army in 1942, when the United States entered the war, rising to the rank of major by 1945. His work was in intelligence, and he served as a staff officer to General Omar Bradley in the Normandy campaign and thereafter.

=== Literary career ===
On being discharged in 1946, FitzGibbon was offered, but refused, a job with the successor to the Office of Strategic Services (OSS), a predecessor of the Central Intelligence Agency (CIA). Instead, he worked briefly as a schoolmaster at Saltus Grammar School in Bermuda from 1946 to 1947, before becoming a full-time independent writer. He lived in Italy for a time, where Norman Douglas "reluctantly agreed to cooperate with [him] on an authorized biography". He gave up on the biography, although in 1953 he wrote a short book about Douglas, and in 1974 he published an article entitled "Norman Douglas: Memoir of an Unwritten Biography". Douglas's first wife, Elsa FitzGibbon, was related to FitzGibbon on her father's side. Between 1950 and 1965, FitzGibbon lived in England.

FitzGibbon wrote prolifically, authoring over 30 books, including nine novels, historical works, memoirs, poetry, and biography. He made programmes for BBC radio, including documentaries about British fascism, the Blitz, and the 1930s hunger marches. He was a regular contributor to newspapers in the UK and Ireland, and for many years wrote for the magazine Encounter. His one stage venture, The Devil at Work (produced by the Abbey Theatre, Dublin in 1971) met with little success.

He translated numerous works from German and French.

Among his translations were:

- Sperber, Manès (1952). The Abyss. Translated by Constantine FitzGibbon. New York: Doubleday & Co.
- Troyat, Henri (1952). The Mountain. Translated by Constantine FitzGibbon. New York: Simon & Schuster.
- Sperber, Manès (1954). Journey Without End. Translated by Constantine FitzGibbon. New York: Doubleday & Co.
- Rank, Claude (1959). Peter Neumann: The Black March - The Personal Story of an SS Man. Translated by Constantine FitzGibbon. New York: William Sloane Associates. ISBN 978-0-553-25360-3.
- Strogoff, Stephan (1961). The Russians. Translated by Constantine FitzGibbon. New York: Random House. OCLC 1389761.

One of his closest friends was Manès Sperber, many of whose books he translated from French, and whose views about the dangers of both left-wing and right-wing tyranny highly influenced Fitzgibbon.

Politically, FitzGibbon identified himself as a strong anti-Communist, after having been drawn to Communism as a young man. His credo, however, was that no political group that resorted to locking its opponents up in camps was any good. He refused to travel to Spain while Franco was alive. During the Troubles in Northern Ireland, he supported civil rights for Catholics but condemned the use of violence by all sides.

His 1960 novel When the Kissing Had to Stop caused controversy because of its explicit anti-CND theme; the book depicts the Soviet occupation of Britain after a left-wing government has removed its nuclear weapons. An ITV adaptation of When the Kissing Had to Stop caused even more controversy, and one writer called FitzGibbon a "fascist hyena". This amused him greatly, and he responded by publishing a collection of essays called Random Thoughts of a Fascist Hyena (1963).

FitzGibbon was a member of the Council of the Irish Academy of Letters, an honorary fellow of the Royal Society of Literature, and a Guggenheim Fellow. He later became an Irish citizen and lived in County Dublin.

== Personal life ==
FitzGibbon's first, brief, marriage was to Margaret Aye Moung, but during World War II he met Theodora Rosling. They married in 1944 and lived at Sacombs Ash, Hertfordshire, from 1951 to 1959. They had no children. Theodora wrote of their time together in her, partly fictional, memoirs With Love (1982), and Love Lies a Loss (1985). The union also ended in divorce in 1960.

He then married Marion Gutmann in 1960, with whom he had a son, Francis, born in 1961. Their marriage ended in 1965, and he moved to Ireland and married Marjorie Steele, a retired American actress, in 1967. They had a daughter, Oonagh (born 1968), for whom he wrote Teddy in the Tree (1977). He also adopted Marjorie's son, Peter FitzGibbon, from her former marriage. After a short spell in west Cork, the family lived in Killiney, County Dublin, and then in the city.

FitzGibbon died in Dublin on 25 March 1983.

== Publications ==
- The Arabian Bird (1949)
- The Iron Hoop (1950)
- Dear Emily (1952); US-edition as Cousin Emily
- Miss Finnigan's Fault (1953)
- Norman Douglas: A Pictorial Record (1953)
- The Holiday (1953)
- The Little Tour (1954)
- The Shirt of Nessus (1956); US-edition as 20 July, New York: W.W. Norton & Company, 285 p. (1956)
- In Love and War (1956)
- The Blitz (1957)
- Paradise Lost and More (1959)
- Watcher in Florence (1959) The Vine Presse
- When the Kissing had to Stop (1960); new edition (posthumous), (1989)
- Adultery Under Arms (1962)
- Going to the River (1963)
- Random Thoughts of a Fascist Hyena (1963)
- The Life of Dylan Thomas (1965 ed.)
- Selected Letters of Dylan Thomas (1966 ed.)
- Through the Minefield (1967)
- Denazification (1969)
- High Heroic (a novel about the life of Michael Collins) (1969)
- Out of the Lion's Paw (1969)
- London's Burning (1970)
- Red Hand: The Ulster Colony (1971)
- The Devil at Work (1971) (play)
- A Concise History of Germany (1972)
- In the Bunker (1973)
- The Life and Times of Eamon de Valera (1973)
- The Golden Age (1976)
- Secret Intelligence (1976)
- Man in Aspic (1977)
- Teddy in the Tree (1977)
- Drink (1979)
- The Rat Report (1980)
- The Irish in Ireland (1982)
- and translations from French, German and Italian. Translator of the Rudolf Höß "autobiography". Contributor to Encyclopædia Britannica, newspapers and periodicals in Britain, America and elsewhere.

=== When the Kissing Had to Stop ===
The novel was adapted by Giles Cooper in two episodes as part of the ITV Play of the Week series, first broadcast on 16 & 19 October 1962. Directed by Bill Hitchcock, it starred Denholm Elliott, Peter Vaughan and Douglas Wilmer. Only the first episode still exists.
