= Hibernia (personification) =

National personification of Ireland

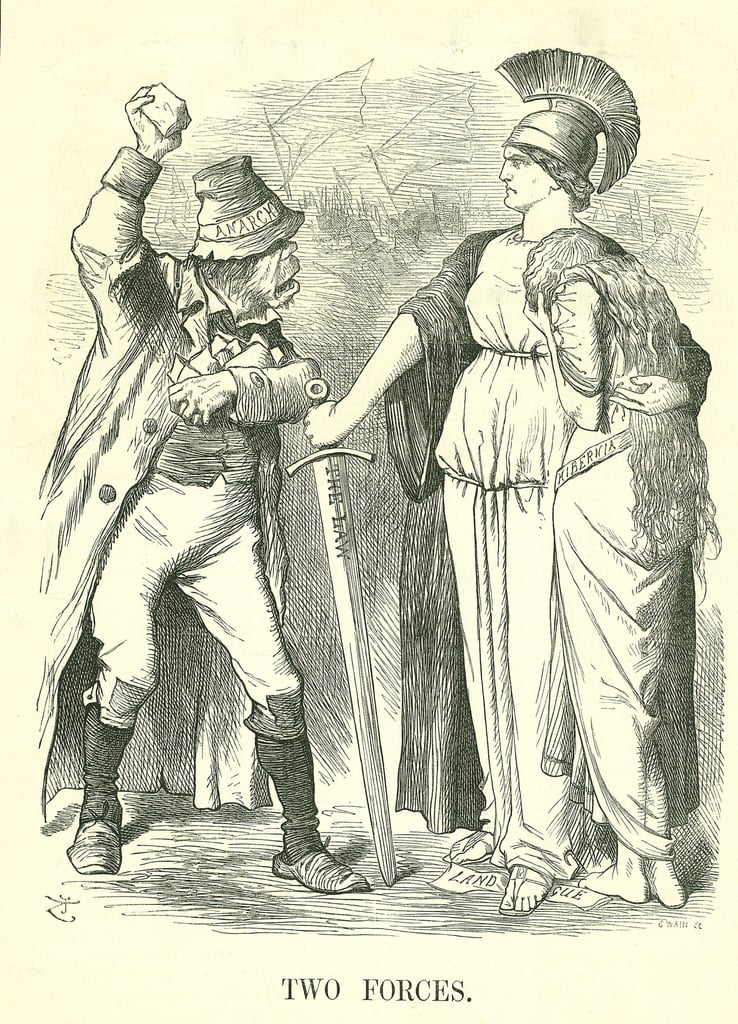
"Britannia protecting her sister Hibernia from the anarchy of Irish nationalism" – Punch, 1881

Hibernia is a national personification of Ireland. She appeared in numerous cartoons and drawings, in particular, during the nineteenth century.

The name derives from the Greek Iernoi, later Ierne, with the Romans naming the island of Ireland Hibernia by possibly mixing in hibernus meaning "wintery".

As depicted in frequent cartoons in Punch, a magazine outspokenly hostile to Irish nationalism, Hibernia was shown as "Britannia's younger sister". She is depicted as an attractive, vulnerable girl, leaning on or being supported by Britannia. She is threatened by manifestations of Irish nationalism such as the Fenians or the Irish National Land League, often depicted as brutish, ape-like monsters. Unable to defend herself, Hibernia is depicted turning to the strong, armoured Britannia for defence. John Tenniel, now mainly remembered as the illustrator of Alice's Adventures in Wonderland, produced a number of such depictions of Hibernia.

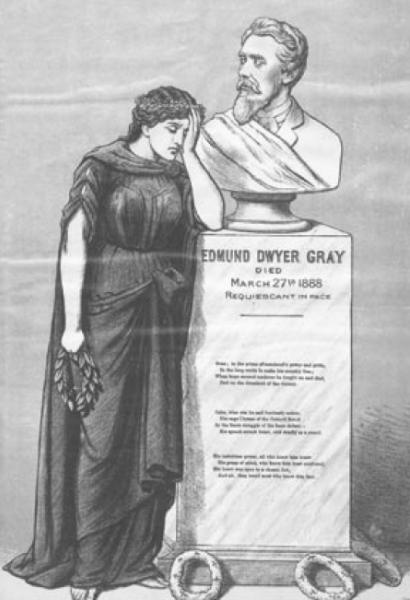
Hibernia representing a mourning Ireland. As published by the nationalist newspaper United Ireland following the death of Edmund Dwyer Gray in 1888.

At times, nationalist publications (such as the Land League and Parnell's United Ireland newspaper) did use the image of Hibernia. However, possibly because of the pro-union publications' adoption of the "helpless" image of Hibernia, nationalist publications would later use Erin and Kathleen Ni Houlihan as personifications of Irish nationhood. However, Irish Nationalists did continue to use the terms "Hibernia" and "Hibernian" in other contexts, such as the Ancient Order of Hibernians. A statue, derived from an original by Edward Smyth and depicting a more confident Hibernia with harp and spear, stands in the central position of three atop the General Post Office in Dublin. The statue appeared on a €2 commemorative coin in 2016 to mark the centenary of the 1916 Easter Rising.

== See also ==
- Éire – Irish name for Ireland
  - Erin – Personal name, romantic name for Ireland
    - Erin go bragh – Anglicised Irish language phrase
  - Mise Éire – Poem by Patrick Pearse (1912)
- Four Green Fields – 1967 Irish folk song by Tommy Makem (the four Provinces of Ireland)
- Róisín Dubh (song) – Irish political song
- The Sean-Bhean bhocht – Traditional Irish song
