= Manès Sperber =

Austrian writer

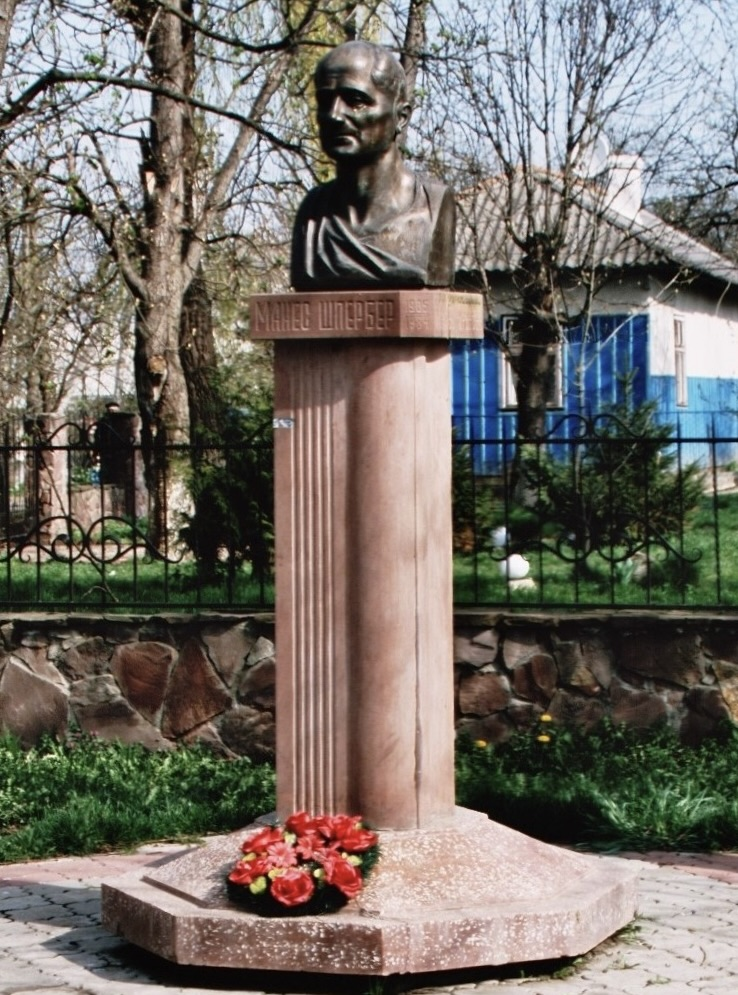
- Manès Sperber memorial in Zabolotiv
- Born: 12 December 1905; Zabolotiv
- Died: 5 February 1984 (aged 78); 14th arrondissement of Paris
- Occupation: Writer, essayist, psychologist, humanist, publisher
- Children: Vladimir Sperber, Dan Sperber
- Relatives: Milo Sperber
- Awards: Friedenspreis des Deutschen Buchhandels (Siegfried Lenz, Alfred Grosser, 1983); Franz Nabl Prize (1977); City of Vienna Literature Prize (1974)

Manès Sperber (12 December 1905 – 5 February 1984) was an Austrian-French novelist, essayist and psychologist. He also wrote under the pseudonyms Jan Heger and N.A. Menlos.

== Early life ==
Manès Sperber was born on 12 December 1905 in Zabłotów, near Kolomea, in the Austrian Galicia (now Zabolotiv, Ukraine). He grew up in the shtetl of Zabłotów in a Hasidic Jewish family. His father was David Mechel Sperber and his older brother was Milo Sperber (born 1911). Milo later moved to Britain and became an actor, often reading from Manès's works.

In the summer of 1916 the family fled from war to Vienna, where the 13-year-old Sperber, having lost his Jewish faith, refused to do his bar mitzvah and joined the Jewish Hashomer Hatzair youth movement. In Vienna he met the psychotherapist Alfred Adler, the founder of individual psychology, and became his student and co-worker. Adler broke with him in 1932 because of differences in opinion about the connection of individual psychology and Marxism.

By 1927 Sperber had moved to Berlin and joined the Communist Party of Germany. He lectured at the Berliner Gesellschaft für Individualpsychologie, an institute for individual psychology.

After Adolf Hitler and the Nazi Party took power in Germany Sperber was taken to jail, but was released after a few weeks on the grounds that he was an Austrian citizen. He emigrated first to Yugoslavia and then in 1934 to Paris, where he worked for the Communist International with Willi Münzenberg. In 1938 he left the party because of the Stalinist purges within it. In his writing he started to deal with totalitarianism and the role of the individual within society (Zur Analyse der Tyrannis).

In 1939 Sperber volunteered for the French Army. After the defeat by Germany, he took refuge in Cagnes, in the "zone libre" (free zone) of France, and had to flee with his family to Switzerland in 1942, when the deportation of Jews started in that zone too.

== Career ==
After the end of the war, in 1945, he returned to Paris, and worked as a writer and as a senior editor at the Calmann-Lévy publishing house.

Sperber was the author of a novel trilogy: Like a Tear in the Ocean: A Trilogy, (1949–1955); of an autobiographical trilogy: All our Yesterdays (1974–1997), and numerous essays on philosophy, politics, literature and psychology. Sperber received the Friedenspreis des Deutschen Buchhandels in 1983. In awarding the prize, the association described Sperber as a "writer, who tracked the path of the ideological aberrations of the century, and freed himself from them entirely. Throughout his life he retained the independence of his own judgement, and incapable of indifference, summoned the courage, to get himself onto that non-existing bridge that only opens up in front of those who step out over the abyss." The German writer Siegfried Lenz gave the speech highlighting Sperber's lifetime achievement.

One of his closest friends was the novelist Constantine FitzGibbon, who translated much of his work into English.

== Personal life ==
Sperber was the father of the Italian historian Vladimir Sperber and the French anthropologist and cognitive scientist Dan Sperber. His first wife, Miriam Sperber, eventually emigrated to Champaign, Illinois, United States, and became a counsellor at the Psychological and Counseling Center there.

== Death and legacy ==
Sperber died on 5 February 1984 in Paris. He was buried in the Montparnasse cemetery in Paris.

In 1988 the city of Vienna dedicated a park in the Leopoldstadt district to Sperber.

The Manès-Sperber-Prize for Literature (Manès-Sperber-Preis für Literatur) was established in 1985 by the then Austrian Ministry of Art and Culture in honour of Sperber, with Siegfried Lenz winning the inaugural prize. As of 2025 it is worth €10,000.

== Awards ==
- 1967 Remembrance Award from the World Federation of Bergen-Belsen Associations
- 1971 Literature Prize of the Bavarian Academy of Fine Arts
- 1971 Austrian Cross of Honour for Science and Art, 1st class
- 1973 Hanseatic Goethe Prize
- 1973 Honorary doctorate from the Sorbonne, in Paris
- 1974 Literary Prize of the City of Vienna
- 1975 Georg Büchner Prize
- 1977 Franz Nabl Prize
- 1977 Grand Austrian State Prize for Literature
- 1979 Prix Européen de l'essai Charles-Veillon
- 1979 Buber Rosenzweig Medal
- 1983 Friedenspreis des Deutschen Buchhandels
- 1983 Ring of Honour of the City of Vienna (Ehrenring der Stadt Wien)

== Works ==
- Charlatan und seine Zeit (written 1924; ed. M. Stančić and W. W. Hemecker 2004)
- Alfred Adler (1926)
- Zur Analyse der Tyrannis (1939)
- Like a Tear in the Ocean: A Trilogy (3 volumes, reprinted by Holmes & Meier 1988)
  - Volume 1 - Burned Bramble (1949)
  - Volume 2 - The Abyss (1950)
  - Volume 3 - Journey Without End (1955)
- The Wind and the Flame (Allan Wingate, 1951) trans. Constantine Fitzgibbon
- Die Achillesferse (1960)
- Zur täglichen Weltgeschichte (1967)
- Alfred Adler oder Das Elend der Psychologie (1970)
- Leben in dieser Zeit (1972)
- Wir und Dostojewski: eine Debatte mit Heinrich Böll u.a. geführt von Manès Sperber (1972)
- All Our Yesterdays (3 volumes)
  - Volume 1 - God's Water Carriers (1974)
  - Volume 2 - The Unheeded Warning: 1918-1933 (1975)
  - Volume 3 - Until My Eyes Are Closed With Shards (1977)
- Individuum und Gemeinschaft (1978)
- Sieben Fragen zur Gewalt (1978)
- Churban oder Die unfaßbare Gewißheit (1979)
- Der freie Mensch (1980)
- The Encyclopœdia of Sexual Knowledge
- Nur eine Brücke zwischen gestern und morgen (1980)
- Die Wirklichkeit in der Literatur des 20. Jahrhunderts (1983)
- Ein politisches Leben – Gespräche mit Leonhard Reinisch (1984)
- Geteilte Einsamkeit – Der Autor und seine Leser (1985) (Essay)
- Der schwarze Zaun (1986) (Fragments of a novel)

== See also ==
- List of Austrian writers
