= Róisín Dubh (song) =

Irish political song

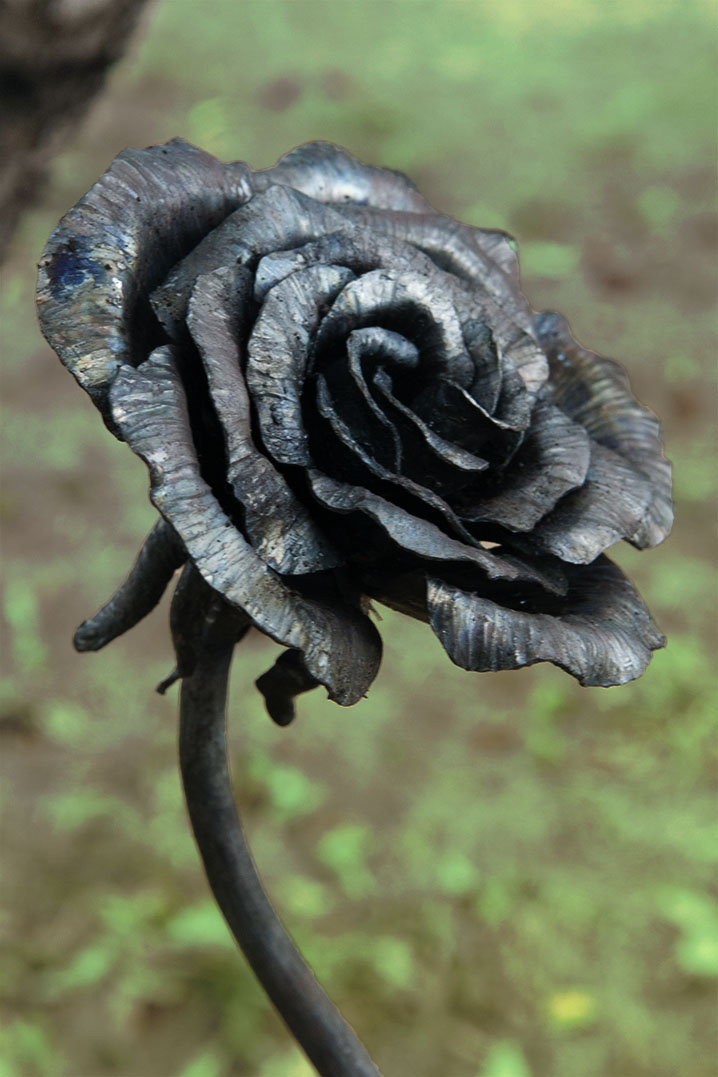
"Róisín Dubh" translates to "Black/Dark Rose" - referring to Róisín's dark hair colour.

"Róisín Dubh" (Irish: [ˈɾˠoːʃiːnʲ ˈd̪ˠʊw]; "Dark Rosaleen" or "Little Dark Rose") is one of Ireland's most famous political songs. It is based on an older love-lyric which referred to the poet's beloved rather than, as here, being a metaphor for Ireland. The intimate tone of the original carries over into the political song. It is often attributed to Antoine Ó Raifteirí, but almost certainly predates him.

== Background ==
The song is named after Róisín Dubh Ní Néill (Rose O'Neill), one of the daughters of Hugh O'Neill, Earl of Tyrone, who was betrothed (and later married) to Red Hugh O'Donnell in 1587, when they were both teenagers. O'Donnell divorced Róisín in 1595. According to G. F. Dalton, Róisín's "misfortunes and her high birth attracted the attention of ballad-makers, who saw her as a type of Ireland."

The song is reputed to have originated during the Nine Years' War in O'Donnell's camps. Another source attributes it to a Tyrconnellian poet under the reign of Red Hugh. According to music scholar Donal O'Sullivan, there is no evidence it was composed that early.

Although Róisín Dubh is superficially a love song, it has been described as a patriotic poem that hides its nationalism via allegory. In a time when nationalistic expression was outlawed in Ireland, the poem was a way to covertly express nationalistic beliefs.

The most popular iteration of Róisín Dubh was adapted by James Clarence Mangan from a fragmentation of an existing love song to Róisín. It is traditionally sung in the Irish language, with only a few recordings of the English existing. It has been translated from the Irish language by Mangan and Patrick Pearse. The following translation is by Thomas Kinsella (The New Oxford Book of Irish Verse, 1986).

Irish	English
A Róisín ná bíodh brón ort fé'r éirigh dhuit: Tá na bráithre 'teacht thar sáile 's iad ag triall ar muir, Tiocfaidh do phardún ón bPápa is ón Róimh anoir 'S ní spárálfar fíon Spáinneach ar mo Róisín Dubh. Is fada an réim a léig mé léi ó inné 'dtí inniu, Trasna sléibhte go ndeachas léi, fé sheolta ar muir; An éirne is chaith mé 'léim í, cé gur mór é an sruth; 'S bhí ceol téad ar gach taobh díom is mo Róisín Dubh. Mhairbh tú mé, a bhrídeach, is nárbh fhearrde dhuit, Is go bhfuil m'anam istigh i ngean ort 's ní inné ná inniu; D'fhág tú lag anbhfann mé i ngné is i gcruth- Ná feall orm is mé i ngean ort, a Róisín Dubh. Shiubhalfainn féin an drúcht leat is fásaigh ghuirt, Mar shúil go bhfaighinn rún uait nó páirt dem thoil. A chraoibhín chumhra, gheallais domhsa go raibh grá agat dom -'S gurab í fíor-scoth na Mumhan í, mo Róisín Dubh. Dá mbeadh seisreach agam threabhfainn in aghaidh na gcnoc, is dhéanfainn soiscéal i lár an aifrinn do mo Róisín Dubh, bhéarfainn póg don chailín óg a bhéarfadh a hóighe dhom, is dhéanfainn cleas ar chúl an leasa le mo Róisín Dubh. Beidh an Éirne 'na tuiltibh tréana is réabfar cnoic, Beidh an fharraige 'na tonntaibh dearga is doirtfear fuil, Beidh gach gleann sléibhe ar fud éireann is móinte ar crith, Lá éigin sul a n-éagfaidh mo Róisín Dubh.	Roisin, have no sorrow for all that has happened to you The Friars are out on the brine. They are travelling the sea Your pardon from the Pope will come, from Rome in the East; And we won't spare the Spanish wine for my Roisin Dubh Far have we journeyed together, since days gone by. I've crossed over mountains with her, and sailed the sea I have cleared the Erne, though in spate, at a single leap And like music of the strings all about me, my Roisin Dubh You have driven me mad, fickle girl- may it do you no good! My soul is in thrall, not just yesterday nor today You have left me weary and weak in body and mind O deceive not the one who loves you, my Roisin Dubh I would walk in the dew beside you, or the bitter desert In hopes I might have your affection or part of your love Fragrant small branch, you have given your word you love me The choicest flower of Munster, my Roisin Dubh If I had six horses, I would plough against the hill I'd make Roisin Dubh my Gospel in the middle of Mass; I'd kiss the young girl who would grant me her maidenhead And do deeds behind the lios with my Roisin Dubh! The Erne will be strong in flood, the hills be torn The ocean will be all red waves, the sky all blood, Every mountain and bog in Ireland will shake One day, before she shall perish, my Roisin Dubh.

== Renditions ==
Róisín Dubh has been frequently performed and recorded, both in its own native Irish and translated into English. (However, quality of the translations vary greatly, from strict ones to those bearing no relationship to the original Irish.) It has been sung by numerous Irish traditional singers including the late Joe Heaney and Maighread Ní Dhomhnaill, as well as in genres ranging from classical to rock and jazz.

The instrumental range is as wide as the vocal, but the instruments best suited to render this air authentically are the native Irish uilleann pipes, flute, fiddle, and whistle, as these are capable of making the "caoine" ("cry"), the note-shaping and changing that is characteristic of the native Irish music. However, other versions using different instruments are also widely available.

Musicians/composers who have performed or recorded the song include these:

- Joe Heaney, famed Connemara sean-nós singer
- The Wolfe Tones recorded it in their debut album The Foggy Dew in 1965
- Paddy Tunney- folk singer and lilter from the county Fermanagh in Ulster
- Maighread Ní Dhomhnaill – native Irish singer from the famed Ó Domhnaill singing family of Rann na Feirste, County Donegal.
- Phil Lynott of Thin Lizzy
- Sinéad O'Connor
- Caitlín Maude on her 1975 album Caitlín
- Cherish the Ladies 1993
- Ann Mulqueen

=== Instrumental ===
- Seán Ó Riada, whose score for the 1959 film Mise Éire was based on the melody
- The Dubliners. Instrumental, circa 1964. Also the song "For what died the sons of Róisín".
- Joanie Madden, leader of Cherish the Ladies, tin whistle instrumental on her solo album Song of the Irish Whistle (1997)
- Máire Ní Chathasaigh recorded an instrumental version for solo harp on her duo album with Chris Newman Live in the Highlands (1995)

=== Others ===
- Thin Lizzy wrote the song "Black Rose" based on the story of Róisín Dubh. This song was covered by Northern Kings on their 2008 album Rethroned.
- Flogging Molly recorded the song "To Youth (My Sweet Roisin Dubh)" on the album Within a Mile of Home (2004)
- Black 47 recorded a song titled Black Rose for the album Home of the Brave.
- The Rubberbandits begin the Irish language version of I Wanna Fight Your Father with a portion of “Róisín Dubh.”

== See also ==
- Kathleen Ni Houlihan
- Mise Éire
- Four Green Fields
- The Sean-Bhean bhocht
- Hibernia (personification)
