= John Drysdale (historian) =

British-born army officer, diplomat and historian

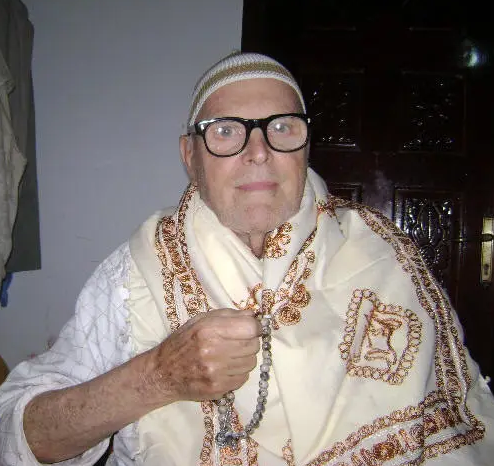
- Born: 21 May 1925; United Kingdom
- Died: 10 July 2016 (aged 91); Somaliland
- Burial place: Hargeisa
- Other name: Abbas Idris
- Citizenship: Somaliland citizenship / British citizenship - dual citizenship
- Education: Oxford University
- Notable work: The Somali Dispute (1964); Singapore Struggle for Success (1984); In the Service of the Nation (1985); Whatever Happened to Somalia (1994)

John Gordon Stewart Drysdale (21 May 1925 – 10 July 2016), also known as Abbas Idriss, was a British-born army officer, diplomat, writer, historian, and businessman. He spent much of his life in Somalia, Somaliland and Singapore. Drysdale served as an advisor to three successive Somali prime ministers in the 1960s and later for three successive United Nations special envoys during the international intervention in the Somali Civil War.

He served as a mediator between factions in Mogadishu during 1992 and 1993. Following the October 1993 Battle of Mogadishu, American President Bill Clinton began to follow the diplomatic resolution to the conflict with the Somali National Alliance that Drysdale had initially proposed to UNOSOM II command months before the battle.

Drysdale, who spoke fluent Somali, was widely regarded as a foreign expert on Somali culture, history, literature and society. He has also authored several books and founded numerous important academic journals and publications. He converted to Islam several years before his death.

== Early life ==
Drysdale served in the British Army during World War II and later became an officer. He first introduced to Somalis when he was deployed to the then-protectorate of British Somaliland in 1943. As a teenage Lieutenant in the British Army he served in the First Somali Battalion (of the two entirely Somali Battalions raised by the Kings African Rifles) during the Burma Campaign against the Japanese and commanded a mortar unit. Drysdale later recounted his experiences with Somali soldiers during the war, stating:

If Somalis accept the inevitability of battle, as the British Army's First Somali Battalion did during World War II in Burma, they enter into it whole heatedly. Cowardice has no role. Audacity is the norm, matched with staunchness in defence, despite poor fire discipline and a tendency in the Burma campaign, after orders for an attack had been issued, to have an independent cocky view of such orders. They had better plans than those of their British officers. Following their own independent ideas as to how the enemy should be engaged, they often proved themselves to have been right but equally often died in the process. It was the Somalis' inconquerable spirit in battle which impressed British officers who served with them in the Burma Campaign.

After the war he retired from the British Army at the rank of Major and pursued education at Oxford University. He joined the Colonial Service and its successor, the Foreign Service, which allowed him to return to postings in Africa. During the 1950s he served in the Gold Coast (present-day Ghana), British Somaliland and the British Military Administration in Ogaden and Haud. From 1955 to 1960 he served as the British liaison officer for Somaliland. He was a participant of the 1956 Harar Border Conference between Halie Selassie's Ethiopian Empire and the British government.

== Diplomatic and writing career ==
Somalia became an independent country in 1960, following the union of the former British Somaliland and the UN Trust Territory of Somaliland. In the years following independence, John Drysdale served as a representative of the British Foreign Service to the Somali Republic.

=== Somali Republic (1960 - 1969) ===
During Drysdale's service in 1963, the British decided against unifying the Somali-inhabited Northern Frontier District (NFD) with Somalia post-Kenya's independence. A staunch supporter of the Somali cause, Drysdale resigned and later penned two detailed articles in the Somali journal Dalka, expressing his sharp disagreement with the British government's policy. As a result he soon after became a political advisor to the then Somali prime minister. Drysdale served as an advisor to three successive Prime Ministers of Somalia following independence. He soon spoke fluent Somali, and became widely regarded as a foreign expert on Somali culture, history, literature and society. Drysdale later expressed the view that Abdirazak Haji Hussein was the "...best Prime Minister Somalia ever had"

During his service with the Somali Republic he authored his first book, The Somali Dispute in 1964. That same year he founded the academic journal Africa Research Bulletin, based in the United Kingdom.

After the 1969 Somali coup d'état he left Somalia and did not return until the fall of Siad Barre's government in 1991. In 1977, Halgan, the Official Journal of the ruling Somali Revolutionary Socialist Party described Drysdale as "...very knowledgeable about Somali history".

=== Post 1969 coup d'état and Singapore ===
He also wrote extensively on other regions Africa and Southeast Asia. He also founded the Asia Research Bulletin, which was published in Singapore in a partnership with the Straits Times Group. Drysdale lived in Singapore for a time and his 1984 book, Singapore Struggle for Success, a history of modern Singaporean society, is still studied by the country's students.

Singapore's longest serving police chief, Goh Yong Hong, described Drysdale as a foreign expert on Singaporean society. The Singapore Police Force significantly assisted Drysdale while he wrote a book on the nations police titled In the Service of the Nation, published in 1985.

=== United Nations Intervention in Somalia (1992 - 1993) ===
During the UN intervention in Somalia in 1992 and 1993, Drysdale was hired by UNOSOM II for his expertise on Somalia and was assigned to three successive UNOSOM II special envoys. Drysdale first became involved in the intervention as a consultant for UNOSOM I and as a UNDP contractor in 1992. As his UNDP contract was set to expire, he was hired by UNOSOM II. He was responsible for initiating the establishment of a UNOSOM supported police service throughout Somalia.

Drysdale pushed against the idea of UNOSOM II forces conducting disarmament in Somalia, as he believed it was impossible.

He was a vocal supporter of political reconciliation with Gen. Mohammed Farah Aidid and the Somali National Alliance instead of the UNOSOM manhunt that followed the 5 June attack on the Pakistanis. He resigned as an adviser on September 30, 1993, distressed by the United Nations emphasis on military operations against the Somali National Alliance and mounting collateral damage being inflicted by UNOSOM on Somali civilians. A few days later, following the disastrous Battle of Mogadishu, President Bill Clinton relented on the American lead hunt for Aidid and begin to closely follow the diplomatic resolution that had been initially proposed by Drysdale months earlier.

The following year he wrote and published a book on the failures of the United Nations Intervention based on his experiences titled Whatever Happened to Somalia.

== Later life ==
In 1993, John Drysdale moved to Hargeisa, working in part as an advisor to then-President Muhammad Haji Ibrahim Egal. Drysdale served as a spokesman for the presidency for a time.

He established a land survey NGO called Cadastral Surveys, which mapped and established farm boundaries in Gabiley and Dilla in the country's west. In the years following he succeeded in surveying 10,800 farms, determining ownership in coordination with local elders. Most notably his project issued ownership documentation along with identity papers to local farmers. This effort significantly reduced local tensions in Gabiley District. A UN report later noted that it was, "...clear that Drysdale’s in-depth knowledge of the people of the area and the community-based methodology (involving elders in verification) were crucial to the success of the programme and its impact on peace" In 2002, he became a member of the first Board of Trustees of Edna Adan Hospital in Hargeisa.

=== Conversion to Islam ===
In 2009, Drysdale converted to Islam at ceremony held in Hargeisa's main Mosque and changed his name to Abbas Idris and became an official Somaliland citizen shortly after. According to Drysdale, he had begun seriously considering converting to Islam a decade earlier. Notably, he became the first Caucasian to vote in Somaliland elections after he acquired dual citizenship. He later married and spend the last years of his life living in Gabiley, Somaliland.

== Books ==
- The Somali Dispute (1964)
- The Somali Peninsula
- Singapore Struggle for Success (1984)
- In Service of the Nation (1985)
- The Money Puzzle
- Somaliland: The Anatomy of Secession
- Whatever Happened to Somalia? A Tale of Tragic Blunders (1994)
- Stoics Without Pillows (2000)

== Death ==
Drysdale died on 10 July 2016 following a short illness. A state funeral was held at the Maslah Muslim burial grounds in Hargeisa on 12 July 2016. Dignitaries in attendance at his funeral included the former President of the Republic of Somaliland, Ahmed Mohamed Mohamoud, members of the British representative office in Somaliland – and the high emissary of the British Embassy in Ethiopia.

== See also ==
- Louis FitzGibbon
- I.M. Lewis
