= Milo Sperber =

British actor (1911–1992)

- Born: Samuel Sperber; 20 March 1911; Zablotow, Sniatyn, Poland
- Died: 22 December 1992 (aged 81); London, England, United Kingdom
- Occupations: Actor; director; writer
- Family: Manès Sperber (older brother)

Milo Sperber (20 March 1911 – 22 December 1992) was a British actor, director and writer who was born in Poland.

== Early life ==
Sperber was born in 1911 into a family of Polish Hasidic Jews who fled anti-Semitism during the Second World War. His older brother was activist, author and intellectual Manès Sperber. The younger Sperber trained as a lawyer in Vienna before joining Max Reinhardt's school; there he played roles in Six Characters in Search of an Author and A Midsummer Night's Dream, among other plays. Martin Esslin was a classmate during this time. While on the rise as an actor, in 1939 he fled Germany and the Nazis with his family, eventually landing in Britain as refugees.

== Career ==
Early in the Second World War, Sperber joined the Oxford Pilgrim Players; he gained experience directing the company on tour in Case 27 VC and spending a season in London even during the Blitz. He also was involved in producing anti-Nazi propaganda for the BBC before the end of the war. His later career included stints in cabaret, theatre and television; in the last capacity, he performed as shoe salesman Mr. Grossman in four episodes of Are You Being Served?. In 1990, at the age of 79, he appeared in Series 2, Episode 7 of Poirot, "The Kidnapped Prime Minister," as Mr. Fingler, Poirot's kvetching tailor.

His big-screen career included performances in minor roles in such films as Foreign Intrigue, The Spy Who Loved Me, Operation Crossbow, In Search of the Castaways and Billion Dollar Brain. He taught for some time at the Royal Academy of Dramatic Art and served as a scriptwriter for the BBC's German language service. Many of his students at RADA went on to succeed in the arts, including Glenda Jackson.

Sperber's last appearance in the West End was in a 1984 production of The Clandestine Marriage at the Albany Theatre; he spent his last years travelling Britain, giving readings from the works of his brother, writer Manès Sperber.

Sperber died on 22 December 1992, aged 81 in London.

== Filmography ==
Year	Title	Role	Notes
1942	Thunder Rock	Mr. Hirohiti	Uncredited
1944	Mr. Emmanuel	Student	
1948	Noose	Taschlik	Uncredited
1949	Golden Arrow	Black Marketeer	
1954	The End of the Road		Uncredited
1956	Foreign Intrigue	Baum	
1960	Bluebeard's Ten Honeymoons	Librarian	Uncredited
1962	In Search of the Castaways	Crooked Sailor	
1963	The Victors	Concentration Camp Prisoner	
1965	Operation Crossbow	German Hotel Porter	
1967	Billion Dollar Brain	Basil	
1976	Voyage of the Damned	Rabbi	
1977	Providence	Mr. Jenner	
1977	The Spy Who Loved Me	Prof. Markovitz	
1978	The Stud	Kamara	Uncredited
1981	Are You Being Served?	Mr. Grossman	
