= Theodora FitzGibbon =

Irish cookery writer

- Born: Joan Eileen Rosling; 21 October 1916; London, England
- Died: 25 March 1991 (aged 74); Killiney, Ireland
- Occupation: Cookery writer
- Spouses: Constantine Fitzgibbon (m. 1944; div. 1960) George Morrison (m. 1960)

Theodora FitzGibbon (née Rosling; later Morrison; 21 October 1916 – 25 March 1991) was an Irish cookery writer, model and actress.

== Early life ==
FitzGibbon was born Joan Eileen Rosling on 21 October 1916 in London to Adam Rosling and Alice Winifred Hodgkins. She was educated at a number of convents, including the Sacré Coeur in Bruges and St Joseph's, Hendon. She travelled widely with her father in India, Europe and the Middle East. It is said that she received cooking lessons from the former Queen Natalie of Serbia at a finishing school in Paris.

== Modelling and acting ==
At age 18, she went on stage in repertory theatre in Birmingham and Coventry and joined a touring company, the English Players, in France under the pseudonym Karen Peterson. She appeared in Anthony Asquith's film Freedom Radio (1941) and acted on the stage in London on the West End. She also modelled for a fashionable couturier, Ronald Traquair.

== Cookery books ==
In 1952, she was commissioned to write a cookery book, Cosmopolitan Cookery in an English Kitchen. She bought a Henry Moore gouache with the book advance. A further twenty-five cookery books included the highly popular series A Taste of, which focused on regional specialities: A Taste of Ireland (1968), A Taste of Scotland, ‘’West Country’’, ‘’Wales’’, ‘’London’’, A Taste of the Sea, A Taste of Paris, A Taste of Rome, A Taste of the Lake District, A Taste of Yorkshire. These books extended the context of recipes with geography, history, sociology, photography and illustrations. Notable other books include the encyclopaedic The Food of the Western World (1976), which took fifteen years to write and included recipes from thirty-four countries, and which won the Glenfiddich Special Gold Medal in 1976, as well as Eat Well and Live Longer (1968).

In 1987 she was awarded the Prix Choucroutre First Prize for European Food Journalism at Bonn. She was one of the founding members of the Irish Food Writers' Guild and became the Guild's first president.

== Other writing ==
Her novel The Flight of the Kingfisher was published in 1967 and made into a successful television play for BBC TV. She wrote two memoirs, With Love (1982), and Love Lies a Loss (1985).

== Relationships and friends ==
She met the photographer and surrealist painter Peter Rose Pulham (1910–1956) in Paris and began an affair. It was he who gave her the name Theodora, according to her autobiography. Through him, she met many important figures of the Parisian art world: Balthus, Cocteau, Dali and Picasso. In London, she met the young painters Francis Bacon, Lucian Freud, John Minton and John Banting. She married the Irish-American writer Constantine Fitzgibbon (1919–1983) in 1944. The marriage lasted fifteen years. In 1960 she married again, to George Morrison (1922–2025). In London she became friends with Norman Douglas, Henry Moore, Dylan Thomas and his wife, Caitlin.

== Death ==
Theodora FitzGibbon died on 25 March 1991 in Killiney, County Dublin.
