= Peter Rose Pulham =

British photographer and surrealist painter

Peter Rose Pulham (1910–1956) was a British photographer and surrealist painter. Examples of his works are in the collections of the Tate and the Scottish National Gallery of Modern Art.

Pulham was born in 1910 in Norfolk. In the 1930s, he started to work as a photographer for Harper's Bazaar, living intermittently in Paris and London. In Paris, he was close to a broad circle of artists, including Pablo Picasso and surrealists such as Max Ernst. He also met Theodora Rosling with whom he lived together for four years, moving to England just before the beginning of the war. In England, he became close friends with Francis Bacon.
