= Mise Éire =

Poem by Patrick Pearse (1912)

Mise Éire (pronounced [ˈmʲɪʃə ˈeːɾʲə], Irish for "I [am] Ireland") is a 1912 Irish-language poem by the Irish poet and Republican revolutionary leader Patrick Pearse. It was first published in 1912 in Pearse's short-lived newspaper An Barr Buadh, and subsequently in his poetry collection Suantraidhe agus Goltraidhe (1914).

== Political relevance ==
In the poem, Pearse personifies Ireland as an old woman whose glory is past and who has been sold by her children.

=== Later use ===
Described as both a literary and historical text, it was regularly used by Republican prisoners in Long Kesh prison as a means of learning and teaching Irish. (Note: Officially, the only literature allowed in the prisoners' cells was the Bible, which was also translated in and out of Irish.)

=== Film ===
The title of the poem was used as a title for a 1959 documentary film by George Morrison, which dealt with key figures and events in Irish Nationalism between the 1890s and the 1910s, including Pearse himself. Seán Ó Riada wrote a soundtrack for the film, also titled 'Mise Éire'.

=== Counter view ===
A poem of the same name by Eavan Boland was written as a counter to Pearse's poem, and its treatment of Ireland and her children. Pearse had already written optimistically on the fate of Ireland's strong sons' martyrdom in his poem "The Mother"; Is Mise takes the opposite, more pessimistic view of the sacrifice. In the words of Boss, Nordin and Orlinder, Boland "opposes and corrects Pearse's view on Ireland...No longer, as in the earlier poem, is the personification of the country 'older than the Old Woman of Beare' but 'a sloven's mix'. The glory of having born 'Cuchulain the valiant' is turned into the picture of the woman 'holding her half-dead baby to her'.

== Cultural usage ==
In 2016, the poem was set to music composed by Patrick Cassidy and performed by the RTÉ Concert Orchestra for the score of the PBS documentary series 1916: An Irish Rebellion, curated by the Keough-Naughton Institute for Irish Studies at the University of Notre Dame. It was also performed by Sibéal Ní Chasaide at the Centenary concert commemorating the 1916 Rising.

== The text ==
Irish (direct translation)

Mise Éire:
Sine mé ná an Chailleach Bhéarra

Mór mo ghlóir:
Mé a rug Cú Chulainn cróga.

Mór mo náir:
Mo chlann féin a dhíol a máthair.

Mór mo phian:
Bithnaimhde do mo shíorchiapadh.

Mór mo bhrón:
D'éag an dream inar chuireas dóchas.

Mise Éire:
Uaigní mé ná an Chailleach Bhéarra.

Translation:

I am Ireland:
I am older than the Hag of Beara.

Great my glory:
I who bore brave Cú Chulainn.

Great my shame:
My own children that sold their mother.

Great my pain:
My irreconcilable enemies who harass me continually.

Great my sorrow:
That crowd, in whom I placed my trust, decayed.

I am Ireland:
I am lonelier than the Hag of Beara.

== See also ==
- Kathleen Ni Houlihan
- Róisín Dubh (song)
- The Sean-Bhean bhocht
- Hibernia (personification)
- Four Green Fields
