= Kathleen Ni Houlihan =

Mythical symbol and emblem of Irish nationalism

Kathleen Ni Houlihan, Abbey Theatre, 1916

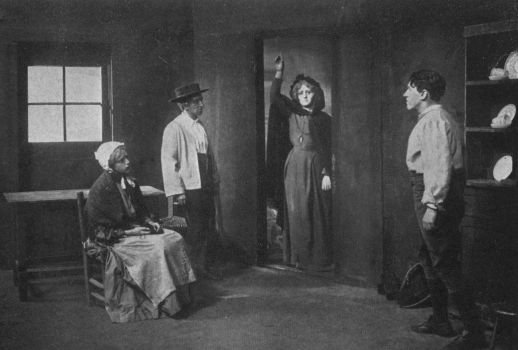
Scene From Yeats and Gregory's play, Cathleen Ní Houlihan, circa 1912 production

Kathleen Ni Houlihan (Irish: Caitlín Ní Uallacháin, literally, "Kathleen, daughter of Houlihan") is a mythical symbol and emblem of Irish nationalism found in literature and art, sometimes representing Ireland as a personified woman. The figure of Kathleen Ni Houlihan has also been invoked in nationalist Irish politics. Kathleen Ni Houlihan is sometimes spelled as Cathleen Ni Houlihan, and the figure is also sometimes referred to as the Sean-Bhean Bhocht (pronounced [ˈʃanˠˌvʲanˠ ˈwɔxt̪ˠ], often spelled phonetically as "Shan Van Vocht"), the Poor Old Woman, and similar appellations. Kathleen Ni Houlihan is generally depicted as an old woman who needs the help of young Irish men willing to fight and die to free Ireland from colonial rule, usually resulting in the young men becoming martyrs for this cause, the colonial power being the United Kingdom. After the Anglo-Irish War, Kathleen Ni Houlihan became associated with the Irish Republican Army in Northern Ireland, especially during the Troubles.

As a literary figure, Kathleen Ni Houlihan was featured by William Butler Yeats and Lady Augusta Gregory in their play Cathleen Ní Houlihan. Other authors that have used Kathleen Ni Houlihan in some way include Seán O'Casey (especially in The Shadow of the Gunman) and James Joyce who introduces characters named Kathleen and Mr Holohan in his story "A Mother" (in Dubliners) to illustrate the ideological shallowness of an Irish revival festival.

== General features and Yeats and Gregory's treatment ==
Kathleen Ni Houlihan is generally portrayed as an old woman without a home. Frequently it is hinted that this is because she has been dispossessed of her home which comprised a farmhouse and "four green fields" (symbolising the four provinces of Ireland). In Yeats and Gregory's Cathleen Ní Houlihan (1902), she arrives at an Irish family's home as they are making preparations for the marriage of their oldest son. In Yeats and Gregory's play, Kathleen Ni Houlihan tells the family her sad tale, interspersed with songs about famous Irish heroes that had given their life for her. She ultimately lures the young groom away to join in the failed Irish Rebellion of 1798 against the British during the French Revolutionary Wars. After the groom makes his decision and leaves, one character notes that the old woman has become a beautiful young woman with the walk of a queen. Yeats and Gregory's treatment of Kathleen Ni Houlihan is fairly typical of this myth. The groom's choice – and eventual death in the failed rebellion – rejuvenates Kathleen Ni Houlihan to some degree.

== Sacrificial aspects of the myth ==
Richard Kearney (1988, p. 218) suggests that the Kathleen Ni Houlihan myth represents the view that the blood sacrifice of heroes is needed to free and redeem Ireland. At the same time, these heroic sacrificial martyrs are rewarded by being "remembered for ever" (Kearney, p. 218). This nationalist sacrificial mythology can be tied to pagan concepts of "seasonal rejuvenation" and the sacrificial aspects of Christianity in the Crucifixion and tradition of martyrdom (Kearney, p. 220). This use of sacrificial martyrdom can also be seen in various hunger strikes used by Irish Republican Army prisoners in the 1980s and other periods (Kearney, ch. 11).

== Selected literary treatments of the myth ==
The figure of Kathleen Ni Houlihan has appeared in several folk songs and poems. Ethna Carbery's "The Passing of the Gael" (1906), which was a sentimental treatment of the Irish diaspora during the 19th century (partly because of the Great Famine of that period), suggested that Irish emigrants longed for their homeland. Carbery refers to Kathleen Ni Houlihan by name as the personification of Ireland that the emigrants miss.

Seán O'Casey's The Shadow of the Gunman (1923) quotes the last line of Carbery's "The Passing of the Gael," as the character Seumas Shields complains about various aspects of Irish culture. O'Casey's treatment of the myth is generally viewed as ironic or sardonic.

Irish poet Seamus Heaney has suggested that the character of Sarah in Brian Friel's Translations (1980) can be seen as a Kathleen Ni Houlihan-like figure desperately trying to regain her voice and identity.

Arnold Bax's classical tone poem, influenced from his time in Ireland also assumes the name Cathleen-Ni-Houlihan.

See Tommy Makem's Celtic/folk song, "Four Green Fields."

In James Joyce's Dubliners (1914) the selection "A Mother" contains the character Kathleen whose mother "determined to take advantage of her daughter's name" during the Celtic Revival.

Queen Elizabeth II's 2011 Irish state visit, on arrival at Casement Aerodrome, the tune “The Walk of a Queen,” was played by the march of the Irish military band, it was written by a composer called Bill Whelan. The title of the song had an ulterior meaning as it was chosen from the closing lines of W.B Yeats 1902 play, used to describe Cathleen ni Houlihan at the end of the play when she returns to a young woman.

== See also ==
- Mise Éire
- Róisín Dubh (song)
- The Sean-Bhean bhocht
- Hibernia (personification)
- Four Green Fields
- Irish folklore
- Irish literature
- List of Ireland-related topics

== Sources ==
- William Butler Yeats and Lady Augusta Gregory, Cathleen Ni Houlihan (1902).
- Richard Kearney, Transitions: Narratives in Modern Irish Culture (Manchester, UK: Manchester University Press, 1988). ISBN 0-7190-1926-5
- Brian Friel, Translations (London: Faber, 1980). ISBN 0-571-11742-2
- Seamus Heaney, "Review of Translations," Times Literary Supplement (1981).
- Ethna Carbery, "The Passing of the Gael,” The Four Winds of Eirinn: Poems by Ethna Carbery, 1906, A Celebration of Women Writers, ed. Seumas MacManus and Mary Mark Ockerbloom, 2003, University of Pennsylvania, 21 March 2005.
- Seán O'Casey, The Shadow of the Gunman: A Tragedy in Two Acts, Three Dublin Plays: The Shadow of the Gunman, Juno and the Paycock, The Plough and the Stars (1923; London: Faber, 1998) 1–62. ISBN 0-571-19552-0
