= Marjorie FitzGibbon =

Irish-American sculptor and actor

- Born: Marjorie Steele; 27 August 1930; Reno, Nevada, United States
- Died: 20 January 2018 (aged 87); Dublin, Ireland
- Known for: Sculpture
- Spouses: Huntington Hartford (m. 1949; div. 1960) Dudley Sutton (m. 1961; div. 1965) Constantine FitzGibbon (m. 1967; died 1983)
- Children: 4

Marjorie FitzGibbon (née Steele; 27 August 1930 – 20 January 2018) was an Irish-American artist and actress.

== Early life and family ==
Marjorie FitzGibbon was born Marjorie Steele on 27 August 1930 in Reno, Nevada, United States. Her parents were Jack, a salesman, and Ora Steele. On her maternal side her family was of Swedish descent, and her paternal grandmother was Native American. She was the second of four daughters. FitzGibbon left the family home in San Francisco to move to Los Angeles to pursue an acting career. While there she studied painting at the Los Angeles County Museum of Art, and won a scholarship to study stage acting at the Actors Lab.

FitzGibbon met her first husband, Huntington Hartford, while working part-time as a cigarette girl in Ciro's Nightclub on Sunset Strip. They were married in 1949 and had two children, John and Catherine. Her first major role was in Tennessee Williams's New York production of Cat on a Hot Tin Roof in 1955. She was part of the Actors' Equity campaign to end segregation of union actors. She bought her parents a ranch in the Santa Monica Mountains. Her father died by suicide soon after. Her daughter, Catherine, died at age 38 in a drug-related accident.

FitzGibbon divorced Hartford in 1960. She met her second husband, Dudley Sutton, marrying him in 1961. They had one son, Peter. She stopped acting, but socialised with her husband's colleagues from the theatre, including Joan Littlewood, Peter O'Toole, John Hurt and Richard Harris. Whilst at a London health farm, she met her third husband, Constantine FitzGibbon. They married in 1967 and had one daughter, Oonagh, and he adopted her son, Peter. They moved to west Cork, and then Killiney, County Dublin and later Dublin city. She died in Dublin on 20 January 2018.

== Artistic career ==
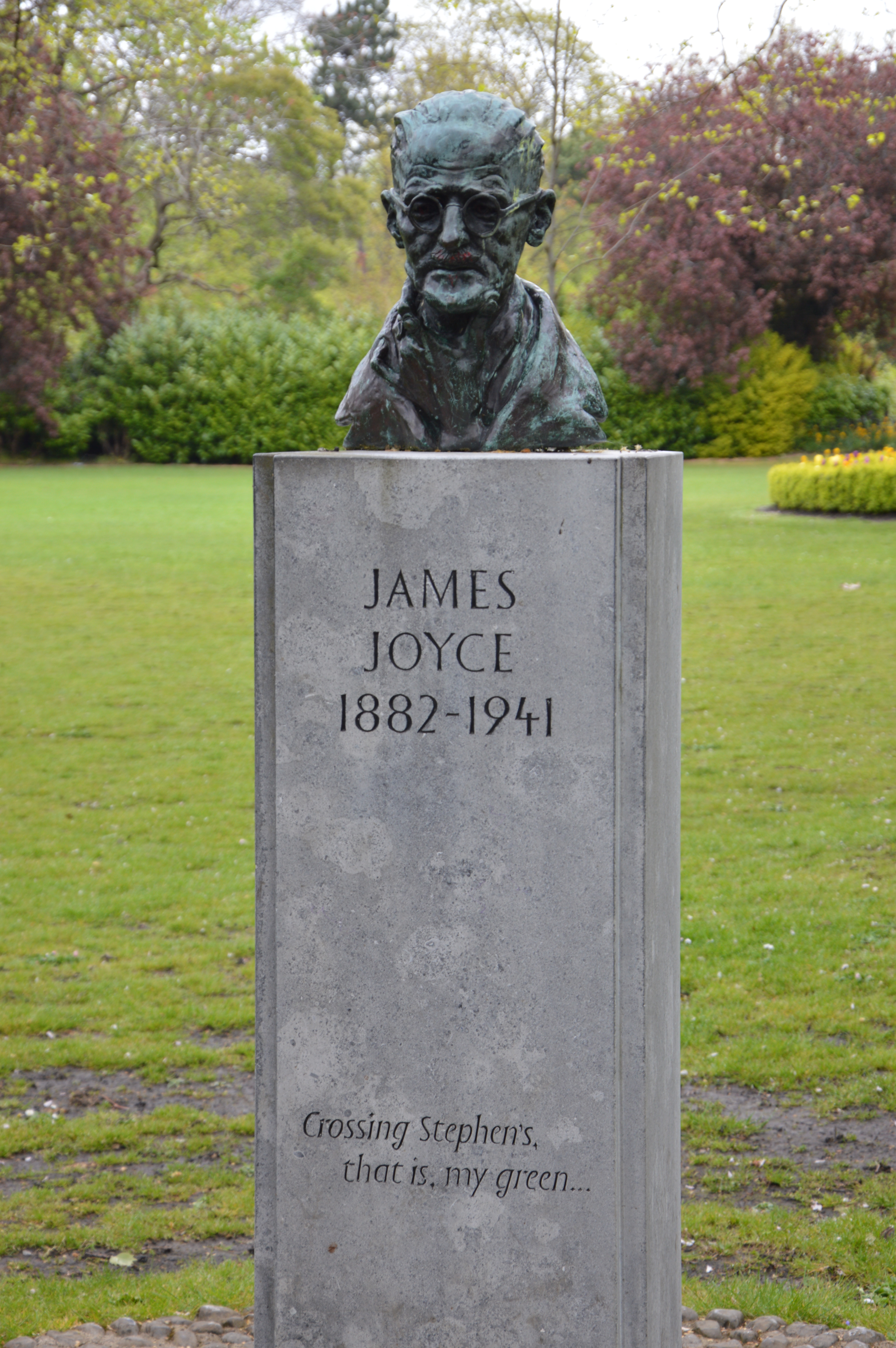
FitzGibbon's bust of James Joyce (1982)

While honeymooning in Greece in 1967, FitzGibbon became interested in sculpture. Encouraged by her friend Micheál Mac Liammóir, she started sculpting heads of prominent Irish literary figures. "She first exhibited at The Brown Thomas Gallery in Dublin in 1970 and soon cultivated a reputation as one of the 'foremost exponents of traditional sculpture in Ireland achieving an authentic, formal likeness in the treatment of her subjects'". One of her most famous works is the statue of James Joyce on North Earl Street, Dublin. She also created a statue of Eamon Andrews in the foyer of the RTÉ offices. She was commissioned by the Royal Dublin Society to create a series of 12 busts of living Irish artists in the early 1970s. She was awarded an honorary doctorate in Fine Art by Stonehill College, Massachusetts.

She had solo exhibitions at Wildenstein Gallery (1953), Godolphin Gallery (1973), Tom Caldwell Gallery in 1978, and the Grafton Gallery in 1985. In 1988 she was commissioned by the Arts Council to produce work for the Heads show which toured schools.
