= George Morrison (documentary maker) =

Irish documentary filmmaker (1922–2025)

- Born: 3 November 1922; Tramore, County Waterford, Ireland
- Died: 2 August 2025 (aged 102); Dublin, Ireland
- Occupation: Documentary filmmaker
- Years active: 1934–2025
- Notable work: Mise Éire; Saoirse?; Lorg na gCloch; The Poetry of Vision
- Spouse: Theodora FitzGibbon (m. 1960; died 1991)

George Edward Morrison (3 November 1922 – 4 August 2025) was an Irish director of documentary films. His works included 1959 documentary Mise Éire and Saoirse?.

== Early life ==
Morrison was born in Tramore, County Waterford on 3 November 1922. His mother was an actress at Dublin's Gate Theatre, while his father worked as a neurological anaesthetist. Morrison studied medicine at Trinity College, Dublin but dropped out in order to pursue his ambition to work in films.

== Career ==
Early in his career he assisted director Hilton Edwards in two of the latter's films: From Time to Time and Hamlet of Elsinore.

For Mise Éire, Morrison painstakingly assembled historical footage of the events surrounding the 1916 Rising from archives across Europe. The result, released by Gael Linn to great acclaim at the 1959 Cork Film Festival, was the first feature-length Irish language film. Morrison later revealed that he was paid £375 for his work on Mise Éire and received no further royalties. The film was permitted to be screened only in the Irish language, which reduced its audience outside Ireland. The sequel, Saoirse?, was not as popular with the Irish public, perhaps due to its focus on the Irish Civil War, a subject that remained divisive for many years after peace was established.

In 2007, Morrison released Dublin Day, his documentary on James Joyce's Ulysses. In September 2008, Morrison was the subject of a film documentary entitled Waiting for the Light, which received its première in Dublin. In February 2009, he received the Industry Lifetime Contribution Award at the annual Irish Film and Television Awards ceremony held in Dublin.

== Recognition ==
Morrison was elected to Aosdána in 2005. The title of Saoi, one of the highest honours in Ireland, was bestowed upon him by the organisation, and he was invested with the torc of that role by President Michael D. Higgins in March 2017.

== Personal life and death ==
Morrison married Theodora FitzGibbon on 17 September 1960. He died on 4 August 2025, at the age of 102.

== Bibliography ==
- Coogan, Tim Pat; Morrison, George (1998). The Irish Civil War. London: Weidenfeld & Nicolson.
