= Cathleen ni Houlihan =

1902 play by W. B. Yeats and Lady Gregory

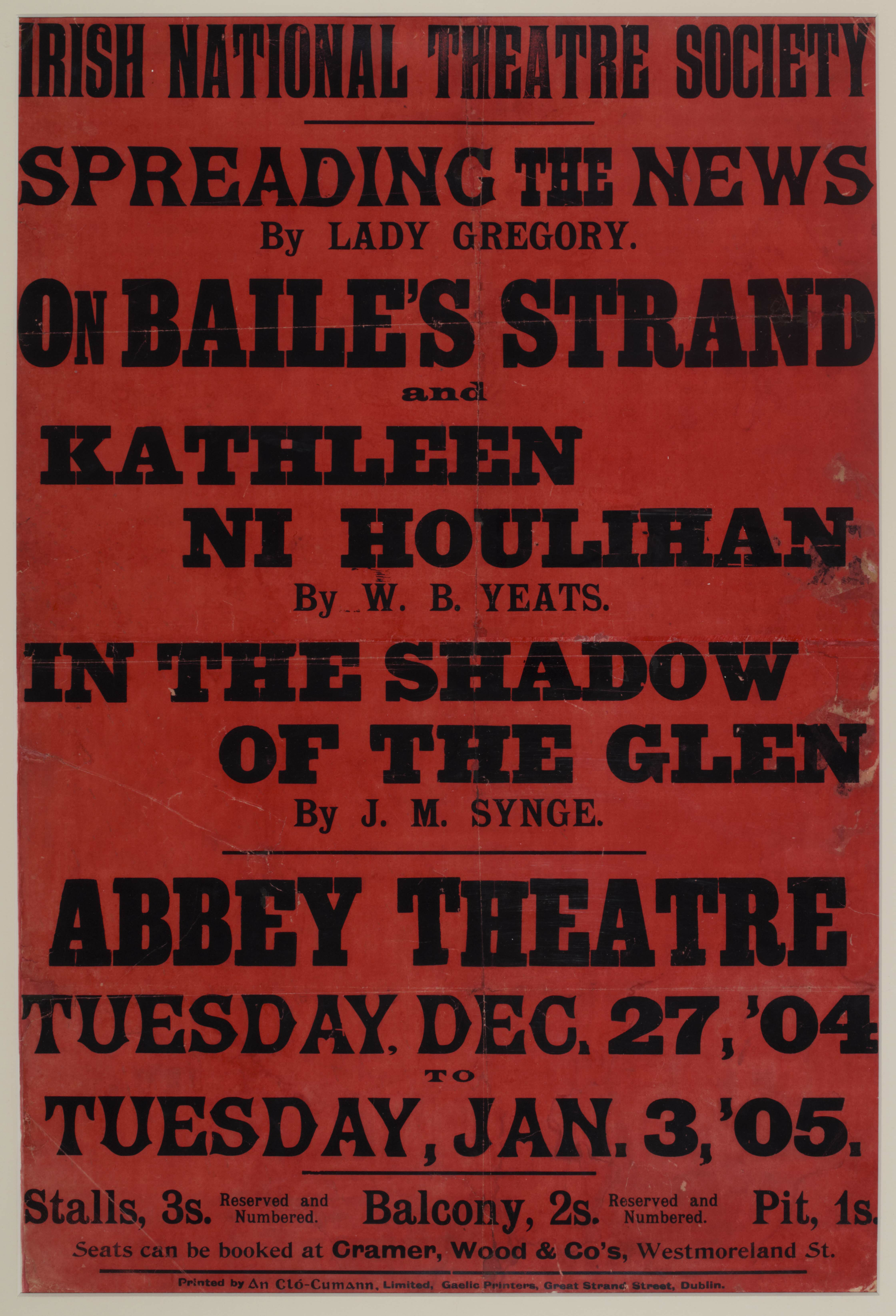
- Poster for the opening of the Abbey Theatre, featuring Cathleen ni Houlihan (1904)
- Written by: William Butler Yeats; Lady Gregory

Premiere
- Date premiered: 2 April 1902
- Place premiered: Dublin

Cathleen ni Houlihan is a one-act play written by William Butler Yeats and Lady Gregory in 1902. It was first performed on 2 April of that year and first published in the October number of Samhain. Lady Gregory wrote the naturalistic peasant dialogue of the Gillane family, while Yeats wrote Cathleen Ni Houlihan's dialogue.

Maud Gonne portrayed Cathleen ni Houlihan in the play's first performances at the Abbey Theatre. The play centres on the 1798 Rebellion. The play is startlingly nationalistic, in its last pages encouraging young men to sacrifice their lives for the heroine Cathleen ni Houlihan, who represents an independent and separate Irish state. The title character first appears as an old woman at the door of a family celebrating their son's wedding. She describes her four "beautiful green fields," representing the four provinces, that have been unjustly taken from her. With little subtlety, she requests a blood sacrifice, declaring that "many a child will be born and there will be no father at the christening". When the youth agrees and leaves the safety of his home to fight for her, she appears as an image of youth with "the walk of a queen," professing of those who fight for her: "They shall be remembered forever, They shall be alive forever, They shall be speaking forever, The people shall hear them forever."

The premiere of Cathleen ni Houlihan initially confused Dublin audiences who had expected a comedic play due to the actor Willie Fay's prior association with comedies. However, Gonne's reputation as an ardent nationalist helped them to understand the “tragic meaning” of her role, as described by Yeats. By the third night the theatre was so crowded that customers had to be turned away.

Yeats later expressed reservations about the play's nationalistic rhetoric of blood sacrifice, asking in a later poem, "The Man and the Echo," "Did that play of mine send out / Certain men the English shot?"

== Characters ==
- Peter Gillane, a farmer
- Michael Gillane, his eldest son
- Patrick Gillane, his youngest son
- Bridget Gillane, Peter's wife
- Delia Cahel, Michael's fiancée
- The Poor Old Woman
- Neighbours

== Synopsis ==
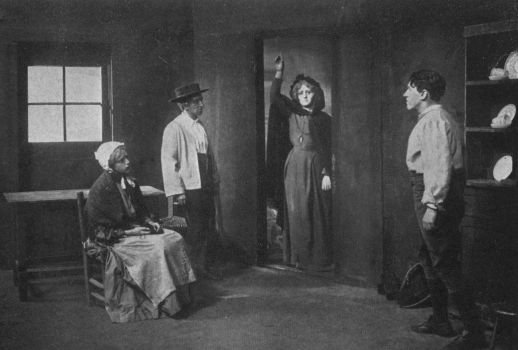
Scene from a 1912 production

The play is set in Killala in 1798. The Gillane family are discussing the upcoming marriage between their son Michael and his fiancée Delia. Peter and Bridget are concerned with obtaining Delia's dowry. They hear cheering outside but are unconcerned with its cause. Michael enters and tells his parents that he has visited the priest to arrange the wedding ceremony for the following day. He gives the dowry to his parents. The family is visited by a mysterious old woman. She tells them that her "four beautiful green fields" have been stolen from her. She sings about patriots who have died for Ireland and reveals herself as Cathleen Ni Houlihan. She tells them that many men have died for her and that more must make sacrifices in order to help her regain her fields and banish the strangers who stole them. Neighbours enter the house and Patrick tells his family that the French ships have landed at Killala bay. The 1798 Rebellion is taking place. Michael is enchanted by Cathleen's words and vows to join the French army, abandoning his parents and his fiancée despite their pleas. Cathleen leaves, saying that "They shall be speaking for ever, / The people shall hear them forever." Peter asks his son Patrick if he saw an old woman leaving, but Patrick tells him that he saw a young girl who had "the walk of a queen."

== Themes ==
The play has themes of nationalism and blood sacrifice. Colm Tóibín describes Michael as an "idealistic, inspirational" male hero in the tradition of Lady Gregory's plays The Rising of the Moon and Gaol Gate, and the Irish mythological hero Cuchulainn, because he is willing to sacrifice his life for his newfound nationalistic beliefs, unaffected by the "land-hunger" which occupies his family. Susan Cannon Harris contrasts the play's depiction of the "male patriot" who makes a blood sacrifice which "symbolically regenerates" Ireland, with the female peasant characters who face the arduous tasks of economic reality which make this regeneration possible. Michael abandons the everyday concerns of dowries, wedding clothes and land purchases in order to follow Cathleen and give up his life for the nationalist cause.

Cannon Harris describes the significance of Maud Gonne's performance as Cathleen ni Houlihan in expressing the play's nationalist themes. Gonne's reputation as a nationalist campaigner and public speaker added to the play's popular appeal. Her disguise as an elderly woman illustrates that the Poor Old Woman is only a veneer who conceals the "uncorrupted essence" of Irish freedom.

Nicholas Grene examines the trope of "strangers in the house" which is used in different contexts throughout the play. The British invaders have stolen Cathleen Ni Houlihan's land and exiled her, forcing her to wander the roads in search of help. The French invaders are seen as "necessary catalysts" for the banishment of the British, while Cathleen herself is a disrupting presence when she visits the Gillane family's home and presents them with a past vision of Irish independence which could be achieved in future.
