= Alan Rawsthorne =

British composer (1905-1971)

- Born: 2 May 1905; Haslingden, Lancashire, England, UK
- Died: 24 July 1971 (aged 66); Cambridge, England, UK
- Spouse(s): Jessie Hinchcliffe (1934–1954); Isabel Nicholas (1955–1971) (his death)

Alan Rawsthorne (2 May 1905 – 24 July 1971) was a British composer. He was born in Haslingden, Lancashire, and is buried in Thaxted churchyard in Essex.

== Early years ==
Alan Rawsthorne was born in Deardengate House, Haslingden, Lancashire, to Hubert Rawsthorne (1868–1943), a well-off medical doctor, and his wife, Janet Bridge (1877/8–1927). Despite what appears to have been a happy and affectionate family life with his parents and elder sister, Barbara (the only sibling), in beautiful Lancashire countryside, as a boy Rawsthorne suffered from fragile health. Although he did at various times attend schools in Southport, much of Rawsthorne's early education came through private tutoring at home. Despite his childhood aptitude for music and literature, Rawsthorne's parents tried to steer him away from his dreams of becoming a professional musician. As a result, he unsuccessfully tried to take on degree courses at Liverpool University, first in dentistry and then architecture. Concerning dentistry, Rawsthorne is on record as having said "I gave that up, thank God, before getting near anyone's mouth", while his friend Constant Lambert quipped "Mr Rawsthorne assures me that he has given up the practice of dentistry, even as a hobby."

== Career ==
In 1925, Rawsthorne was finally able to enroll at the Royal Manchester College of Music, where his teachers included Frank Merrick for the piano and Carl Fuchs for the cello. In 1927, Rawsthorne's mother died aged just forty-nine. After graduating from the Royal Manchester College of Music around 1930, Rawsthorne spent the next couple of years pursuing his piano training with Egon Petri at Zakopane in Poland, and then briefly also in Berlin.

On his return to England in 1932, Rawsthorne took up a post as pianist and teacher at Dartington Hall in Devon, where he became composer-in-residence for the School of Dance and Mime. In 1934, Rawsthorne left for London to try his fortune as a freelance composer. His first real public success arrived four years later with a performance of his Theme and Variations for Two Violins at the 1938 International Society for Contemporary Music (ISCM) Festival in London. The next year, his large-scale Symphonic Studies for orchestra was performed in Warsaw, again at the ISCM Festival. The first in a line of completely assured orchestral scores, the Symphonic Studies, which can be heard as a concerto for orchestra in all but name, rapidly helped Rawsthorne establish himself as a composer possessing a highly distinctive musical voice.

Other acclaimed works by Rawsthorne include a viola sonata (1937), two piano concertos (1939, 1951), an oboe concerto (1947), two violin concertos (1948, 1956), a concerto for string orchestra (1949), and the Elegy for guitar (1971), a piece written for and completed by Julian Bream after the composer's death. Other works include a cello concerto, three acknowledged string quartets among other chamber works, and three symphonies.

Rawsthorne wrote a number of film scores. His best–known work in this field was the music for the 1953 British war film The Cruel Sea, and his other scores included many popular British films, such as The Captive Heart (1946), School for Secrets (1946), Uncle Silas (1947), Saraband for Dead Lovers (1948), Pandora and the Flying Dutchman (1951), Where No Vultures Fly (1951), West of Zanzibar (1954), The Man Who Never Was (1956) and Floods of Fear (1958).

Rawsthorne died from pneumonia at Addenbrooke's Hospital in Cambridge on 24 July 1971.

== Family ==
In 1934, Rawsthorne married his first wife Jessie Hinchcliffe, a violinist in the Philharmonia Orchestra. They separated in 1947 and divorced in 1954. Hinchcliffe went on to marry René Leibowitz in Paris. In 1955, he married Isabel Rawsthorne (née Isabel Nicholas), an artist and model well known in the Paris and Soho art scenes. Her contemporaries included André Derain, Alberto Giacometti, Pablo Picasso and Francis Bacon. Isabel Rawsthorne was the widow of composer Constant Lambert and stepmother to Kit Lambert, manager of the rock group the Who, who died in 1981. Alan Rawsthorne was her third husband; Sefton Delmer (a journalist and member of the Special Operations Executive during the Second World War) was her first husband. Isabel died in 1992.

== Compositions ==
=== Ballet ===
- Madame Chrysanthème (1955)

=== Orchestral ===
- Light Music for Strings (1938)
- Symphonic Studies (1938)
- Street Corner Overture (1944-5)
- Cortèges, Fantasy Overture (1945)
- Prisoners' March – from film The Captive Heart (1946)
- Concerto for String Orchestra (1949)
- Symphony No. 1 (1950)
- Music from film The Cruel Sea (1953)
- Suite from Madame Chrysanthème (1957)
- Hallé Overture (1958)
- Symphony No. 2 A Pastoral Symphony (1959)
- Symphony No. 3 (1964)
- Improvisations on a Theme by Constant Lambert (1960)
- Divertimento for Chamber Orchestra (1962)
- Elegiac Rhapsody for Strings (1963)
- 'Suite for Brass Band' (1964)
- Overture for Farnham (1967)
- Theme, Variations and Finale (1967)
- Triptych for orchestra (1969)

=== Concertante ===
- Clarinet Concerto (1936–37)
- Piano Concerto No. 1 (1939, revised 1942)
- Oboe Concerto (1947)
- Violin Concerto No. 1 (1948)
- Concertante Pastorale for flute, horn and orchestra (1951)
- Piano Concerto No. 2 (1951)
- Violin Concerto No. 2 (1956)
- Cello Concerto (1966)
- Concerto for Two Pianos and Orchestra (1968)

=== Chamber ===
- Sonatina for Flute, Oboe and Piano (1936)
- Concertante for Piano and Violin (1937)
- Theme and Variations for Two Violins (1937)
- String Quartet No. 1 (1939)
- Clarinet Quartet (1948)
- String Quartet No. 2 (1954)
- Concerto for Ten Instruments (1961)
- Piano Trio (1962)
- Quintet for Piano, Oboe, Clarinet, Horn & Bassoon (1963)
- String Quartet No. 3 (1965)
- Piano Quintet (1968)
- Suite for Flute, Viola and Harp (1968)

=== Instrumental ===
- Violin Sonata in E minor (1927 - missing)
- Violin Sonata in A major (c.1933)
- Violin Sonata in A minor (c.1934)
- Pierrette: Valse Caprice for violin and piano (c.1934)
- Concertante for violin and piano (1934)
- Suite for Treble Recorder & Piano (1939)
- Viola Sonata (1937, revised 1953)
- Cello Sonata (1949)
- Violin Sonata (1958)
- Elegy for Guitar (1971)

=== Piano ===
- Ballade in G sharp minor (dated Christmas 1929)
- Bagatelles (1938)
- The Creel: suite for piano duet (1940)
- Piano Sonatina (1949)
- Four Romantic Pieces (1953)
- Ballade (1967)

=== Vocal orchestral ===
- A Canticle of Man: chamber cantata (1952)
- Practical Cats for speaker and orchestra (1954)
- Medieval Diptych (1962, BBC Proms)
- Carmen Vitale: choral suite (1963)
- The God in a Cave: cantata (1966)
- Tankas of the Four Seasons (1965, Cheltenham Festival)

=== Choral ===
- Canzonet from A Garland for the Queen (1953)
- A Rose for Lidice (1956)
- Four Seasonal Songs (1956)
- Lament for a Sparrow (1962)
- The Oxen (1965)

=== Vocal ===
- Three French Nursery Songs (1938)
- We Three Merry Maids (1940)
- Two Songs to Words by John Fletcher (1943)
- Carol (1948)
- Saraband (with Ernest Irving) (1948, taken from the film Saraband for Dead Lovers)
- Scena Rustica for soprano and harp (1967)
- Two Fish (c. 1970)
