= Ballet Black =

British ballet company

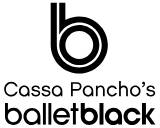
- Formation: 2001
- Headquarters: London, United Kingdom
- Founder: Cassa Pancho

Cassa Pancho's Ballet Black is a British ballet company. It was founded by Cassa Pancho OBE in 2001 as a response to the lack of professional Black and Asian ballet dancers in the UK. The Company was established to provide dancers and students of black and Asian descent with inspiring opportunities in classical ballet. In addition to the professional performing company, Ballet Black also has three BB Junior Ballet School locations, based in London, for ages 3 to 18. The classes are held in Shepherd's Bush, West London, Marylebone and Stratford and the teachers include artistic director Cassa Pancho and Senior Artist Isabela Coracy. The junior school is a key part of the work of Ballet Black, and is essential to creating, building and sustaining the future of diversity in ballet. The company has made a list of actions resources available on their website so that other companies and dance schools can made active steps to become inclusive and anti-racist.

== Members ==
In addition to company Founder, Artistic Director Cassa Pancho the ballet black founding members included Denzil Bailey (ballet master, dancer and choreographer), Celia Grannum Perarnaud (dancer), Sia Kpakiwa (Kiwa) (dancer), Florence Raja (née Kollie), Jake Nwogu (dancer), Gerrard Martin (dancer) and Frederic Claudel (dancer).

== History ==
Ballet Black achieved charity status in 2004. Its patrons are Thandiwe Newton OBE and Kwame Kwei-Armah OBE, and Althea Efunshile is the chair of the trustees. Arts Council England made Ballet Black a National Portfolio Organisation (NPO) for 2018-2022 and awarded them £880,000.

Ballet Black have been nominated for and have won numerous dance awards including The Critics' Circle National Dance Awards, Sky Arts, and Oliviers. In the 2012 National Dance Awards (announced Jan 2013) they won the Grishko Award for the Best Independent Company, and in the 2018 awards their dancer José Alves won Outstanding Male Dancer in Classical Performance, while Cathy Marston won Best Classical Choreography, both for work on The Suit. Other nominations included the company's Arthur Pita's nomination for the Laurence Olivier Award for Outstanding Achievement in Dance in 2014 for his choreography of A Dream Within A Midsummer Night's Dream, and the same piece receiving a nomination for the 2015 Sky Arts award for dance.

Ballet Black have featured in documentaries including The South Bank Show in 2016 and BBC Four's Danceworks.

A collaboration with dance shoe company Freed of London was announced in 2018. Freed added two new colours, "Ballet Bronze" and "Ballet Brown" to their range of pointe shoes.

Senior Artists Cira Robinson and Mthuthuzeli November danced as part of Stormzy's headlining act on the Pyramid stage at Glastonbury Festival 2019.

The company's founder and artistic director Cassa Pancho was appointed O.B.E. in the 2026 New Year Honours "For services to Ballet".

== See also ==
- Ballet companies in the United Kingdom
