= Miriam Syowia Kyambi =

Kenyan artist, multimedia, filmmaker, curator (born 1979)

Syowia Kyambi
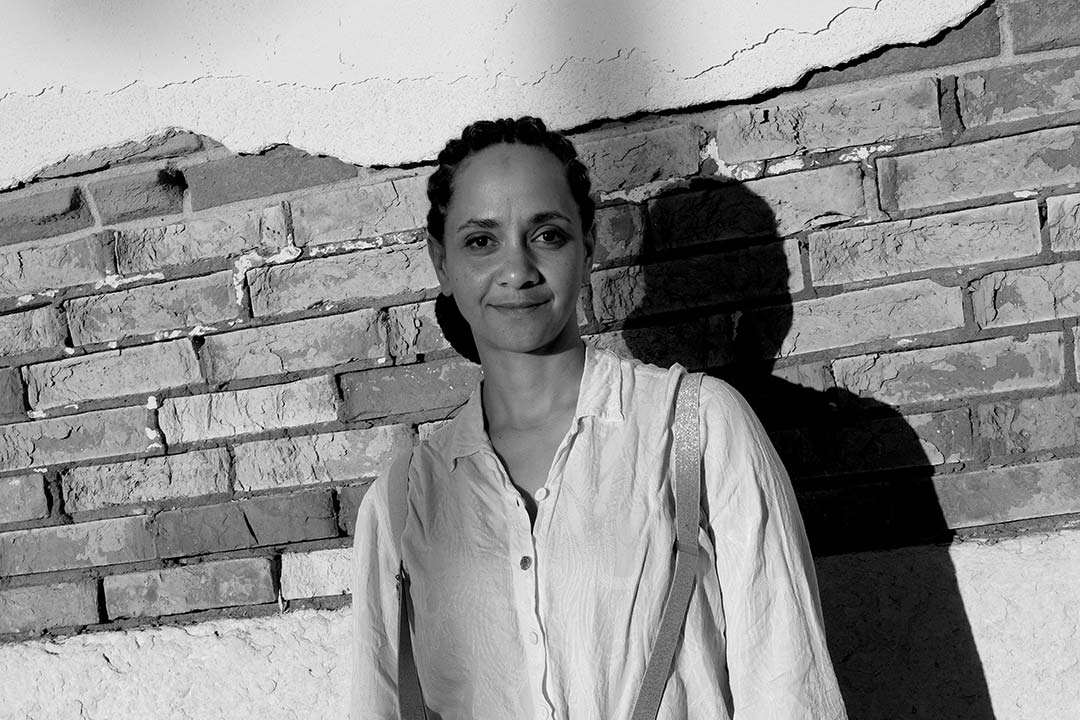
- Born: Miriam Syowia Kyambi; 23 September 1979 (age 47); Nairobi, Kenya
- Education: School of the Art Institute of Chicago Transart Institute for Creative Research
- Notable work: Kaspale's Playground (2020); I Have Heard Many Things About You (2016); Fracture (i) (2016); Between Us: Chapter I (2014)
- Awards: -2nd place in UNESCO Award for the Promotion of the Arts
- Elected: Chair of The Association of Visual Artists and Collectives (AVAC) - Kenya
- Website: syowiakyambi.com

Syowia Kyambi is a multimedia and interdisciplinary artist and curator whose work spans photography, video, drawing, sound, sculpture, and performance installation. She is of Kenyan and German descent, based in Nairobi, Kenya. She is known for her "performative installations that recast historical (Western) narratives and intervene in spheres of colonial activities" with work reputed for tackling "complex and sometimes difficult or tabooed matters" that afford "multiple points of entry, grounded in a sense of place and history while recognizing the mutability of those concepts." Through focusing on historical past, she also draws the audience's attention to daily life through her artwork.

== Early life and education ==
Syowia was born in 1979 in Nairobi, Kenya, to a Kenyan father and German mother and grew up in Kenya. At 18 she decided to fly to the United States. She attended the School of the Art Institute of Chicago, where she obtained her Bachelor of Fine Arts degree in 2002 before returning to Kenya in 2003. She holds an MFA from the University of Plymouth - Transart Institute (2020).

== Career ==
Her work combines the use of performance along with mediums such as clay, sisal, paint, and photography. Most of her work analyzes perception and memory. Kyambi examines how modern human experience is influenced by constructed history, past and present violence, colonialism, family, and sexuality. Kyambi expresses, through her artwork, the struggles of Kenyan history, including how Kenyan people used to work for the British in colonial times. Throughout Kyambi's career, her artwork has repeatedly proven that colonialism is an insensitive act. She does this through her multi-media artwork, which educates the public about colonialism. Kyambi uses artifacts as research for her installations, projects, or multi-media artwork. This second source helps her collect history and information about its origin. Using historical items to guide her artwork, she also uses her research through her photographic works and performance art. These historical items are typically used in her performance art and photographs and represent symbolism relating to the artifact.

== Projects ==
=== 'Rose's Relocation' ===
28 cm x 38 cm, digital piece printed on matte paper

Miriam Syowia Kyambi is always tying her culture back into her projects. A piece called 'Rose's Relocation' is a digital piece printed on matte paper. This piece is 28 cm x 38 cm. Kyambi's representation combines two worlds of this one character centered in the photo. This character is living in rural Kenya. This character is exposed to French culture and the materialism involved there. This character is left feeling alone and struggling with self-recognition. The character was in Kenya in the past, but now facing France in her present life, she is confused between the two countries.

== Exhibitions ==
Kyambi has exhibited in galleries, museums, and project spaces in Belgium, Finland, Germany, Ireland, Kenya, Mali, Mexico, Senegal, Sweden, France, South Africa, Uganda, United Kingdom, the USA and Zimbabwe. She aims to engage the viewer in a dynamic process that will leave them with a powerful visual impression they will never forget.

- Fracture I, 2011, installation & performance
- Between Us, 2014, installation & performance
- Permiso: Peep Box, 2009, mixed media installation
- Infinity - Flashes of the Past, 2007, permanent installation
- Portals (I) Houses of the Present Past, 2010, mixed media installation
- What Cultural Fabric?, 2010, photography
- Permiso: Excuse Me, 2009, photography

=== Fracture I (2011–2015) ===
Fracture I is a performance art piece viewed in the Kouvola Art Museum that was first performed at its opening on 29 April 2011. The performance lasted roughly one hour.

According to Johanna Vuolasto, who is a curator at the Poikilo Kouvola Art Museum, in this performance, Kyambi uses the female body to transcend her message of how individuals store their experiences, good and bad, and continue to live their lives. Kyambi explores the question of what will happen to humanity if people cannot process those abhorrent experiences or mourn the lives they have lost. Kyambi believes that people living in fear deserve a chance to be themselves. She says that the desire for justice is universal.

Vuolasto also said that performance narration was strong, and dexterous, and simplified in a way. Kyambi allowed herself to go through an agony that she allowed to spread through the audience, and it constructed a dialogue between herself, the viewers were the narrators. In conclusion, Kyambi faced the agony of the past, relinquished the portrayal she had built, and accepted the feelings of sorrow and agony. Within that process, Kyambi could rediscover what was once her life. By this time, the audience stood awestruck. Vuolasto said that some audience members returned frequently to see it, and others wept because they understood the message that Kyambi was trying to get across.

=== Between Us (2014) ===
This piece is an experimental multi-media production that incorporates performance, installation, photography and video.

In this work, Kyambi collaborated with another artist and choreographer, James Mweu, along with dancers from the Kunja Dance Theatre, to help her perform and create material that centralizes her personal, contemporary viewpoints; such as the body, gender issues, and social perception.

Kyambi and her dancers performed this piece over a period of four weeks, and their final performance was held on 5 July 2014. This performing art piece was hosted at the GoDown Arts Centre in Nairobi.

=== Permiso: Peep Box (2009) ===
This project is a mixed-media installation and sculpture work. Kyambi spent a lot of her time in Mexico observing people. She concluded that certain positions and gestures can mean one thing, but when you put them in a different context, they can mean something different. She compares that to her art. She believes presentation is important because the same gesture can be read differently based on shifted view of the art.

Her aim is for Peep box to illustrate the perceptions of moments.

=== Gloves II (2012) ===
This is a series of work that is photography-based. Kyambi collaborated with James Muriuki. They used sterile gloves because they were a material that they noticed a lot in the hospital section as well as in laboratories during their research at KEMRI. Kyambi observes that they are a material that protects as well as creates a barrier.

Kyambi and Muriuki then started to explore how they could use the gloves as a form of art and visual conduit. They threw the gloves up in the air and watched them fall naturally. As they did so, Muriuki saw the light through the gloves as they took pictures of them in mid-air. This process started their series the Conjured Paths, Skies, Herbs, and Gloves.

This project was done during the Art in Global Health Residency, which was part of the Wellcome Collection Grant in 2012.

=== Infinity - Flashes of the Past (2007 - current) ===
The images used in this work were scanned from the Nairobi National Museum's archive department. Kyambi used records going as far back as 1898 until current times. The images that she used in this piece were used to combine normal everyday life with political figures and monumental moments in Kenya's history.

=== Portals (I) Houses of the Present Past (2010) ===
This work consists of earthenware ceramic work with sisal rope, hessian cloth and Christmas lights. Kyambi visited the places that inspired this work such as the Fort Jesus Museum, Mombasa, the Kilifi Sisal Plantation Farm, Kilifi, the Karen Blixen Museum, Nairobi, and the Kenya Railway Station and train line from Nairobi to Mombasa.

This was part of the My World Images Festival 2010.

=== Moments (I) (2011) ===
During Kyambi's process of breaking clay pots during Fracture (I), the red paint inside caused her to instinctively walk around in circles in the aftermath of her performance right outside her studio.

These images capture a "moment of leaving marks, footprints which is more interesting than the performance itself", says Kyambi.

=== Infinite Consciousness (2012) ===
This piece is part of a series of works that were collaborated with James Muriuki. They were interested in the relationship between health researchers based at Kenya Medical Research Institute (KEMRI) and their relationship with the participants in their studies.

This project was done during the Art in Global Health Residency which was part of the Wellcome Collection Grant in 2012.

=== What Cultural Fabric? (2010) ===
Kyambi says that the images were close-ups of a shirt that belonged to her mother. The shirt becomes a piece of fabric and could be mistaken for hessian cloth. This shirt symbolises growth, agriculture, construction and interior decorating.

This work was shown at the Nairobi National Museum.

=== Permiso: Excuse Me (2009) ===
This work is an exhibition that was born after a two-month trip to Mexico City. There, Kyambi researched the connections between Mexican visual, social, and historical cultural influences in comparison to Kenya's cultural history.

== Exhibitions ==
Miriam Syowia Kyambi has had 10 exhibitions with some of them being solo.

- Ven är staden? Who is the city?, Center for Architecture and Design, Stockholm, Sweden, 2013–2014
- Foreign Bodies/Common Ground Wellcome Collection, London, United Kingdom, 2013–2014
- 1-54 Contemporary African Art Fair, London, United Kingdom, 2013
- Layers, Nairobi National Museum, Kenya, 2012
- The Fair Brunef, Roots Contemporary Gallery, Brussels, Belgium, 2012
- ARS 11, Poikilo Kouvola Art Museum, Kouvola, Finland Kenya, 2011
  - This exhibition was organized in cooperation with Kiasma, the Museum of Modern Art in Helsinki. ARS is the biggest modern art festival in the Nordic countries. It was first launched in Ateneum Art Gallery in 1961. This exhibition is the 8th ARS exhibition and also a 50th jubilee exhibition.
- SPace: Currencies in Contemporary African Art, Museum Africa, Johannesburg, South Africa, 2010

== Solo presentations ==
- Kaspale (2023), Nairobi Contemporary Art Institute (NCAI), Kenya.
- Between Us (2014), Go Down Art Centre, Nairobi, Kenya.
- Permiso: Excuse Me (2010), Nairobi National Museum, Kenya.
- Cross Cultural Connection (2009), La Casa de San Fernando, D.F Mexico City, Mexico.
- Gender, Power & the Past (2008), Goethe-Institute Nairobi, Kenya.
- WoMen, Fraulein, Damsel & Me & Domestic Violence (2008), Installation Space, Rahimtulla Museum of Modern Art, Nairobi, Kenya.

== Collections ==
Her work is included in the collections of the Robert Devereux Collection, London, the Kouvola Art Museum Collection, Finland, the National Museum of Kenya, the Nairobi Contemporary Art Institute (NCAI) and with the Sindika Dokolo Foundation as well as a number of private collections.

== Bibliography ==
- Mitic, Ginanne Brownell (2015-10-01). "Curator Puts Contemporary African Art on the Map". The New York Times.ISSN 0362-4331. Retrieved 2015-10-13
- "6 Feminist African Artists Changing The Body Of Contemporary Art". The Huffington Post. Retrieved 2015-10-13.
- Reinink, Aldine. (June 2015). "Miriam Syowia Kyambi". Retrieved from https://vimeo.com/126049483.
- Van Deursen, Rosalie. (2015-03-06). Miriam Syowia Kyambi. Retrieved from http://www.urbanafricans.com/miriam-syowia-kyambi/.
