= Maureen Lehane =

Mezzo-soprano singer, university lecturer and founder of the Great Elm Music Festival

Maureen Theresa Lehane Wishart (18 September 1932 – 27 December 2010) was an English mezzo-soprano singer, university lecturer and founder of the Great Elm Music Festival, Jackdaws Music Education Trust and an annual Vocal Award for young singers. She was known for her recordings and performances of Handel's operas.

She was married to the English composer Peter Wishart. They lived in Great Elm near Frome, Somerset.

== Family life ==
Born in London, Maureen was the daughter of Christopher and Honor Lehane. The whole family were evacuated in World War II to Welwyn Garden City. They returned to London after the war, moving to Barnet.

Lehane married Peter Wishart on 26 May 1966. They lived and worked together until his death in 1984. Together they edited 3 volumes of Purcell song realisations, and she recorded a CD of his songs with pianist Alexander Kelly (BMS 409).

== Education ==
Maureen attended 'Queen Elizabeth's Grammar School for Girls' in Barnet. She is reported to have had a reciprocated dislike for the choir director there who refused to allow her into the choir on the grounds that she did not have a voice. Later in life, she gave a recital at the school and saw her former adversary in the front row.

Lehane's music tuition began with private lessons from Gordon Clinton, who also taught her father, in the Dinely Music Studios on Oxford Street. From here she was given theatrical parts with productions by the amateur Risley Operatic Group, including the title role in Gilbert and Sullivan's Iolanthe in 1952, produced by her father.

After secondary school, Lehane began a course in textile design at Hornsey School of Art. She didn't finish the course, but instead went to the Guildhall School of Music and Drama on a scholarship, entering with the inaugural Kathleen Ferrier Award in 1956. With an Arts Council award and at the advice of baritone and conductor Dietrich Fischer Dieskau she went to study in Berlin, but this proved unsuccessful and she returned to England. At the age of 26, her mother submitted her name to John and Aida Dickens (Joan Sutherland's teachers) who awarded Maureen a scholarship consisting of seven years' free tuition.

== Professional career ==
As a professional singer, Maureen performed at Sadler's Wells in the Handel Opera Society's production of Ariodante in 1974, Glyndebourne Festival, Royal Festival Hall in 1970, and at Carnegie Hall in 1966 in Handel's Serse. She sang across the UK, Germany, Austria, the Netherlands, Switzerland, Poland, Sweden and the U.S. In 1971, she went on a five-month tour of Australia, the Orient and the Middle East. Her repertoire extended from early composers such as Monteverdi, Handel and Bach through Brahms and Wagner to Honegger, Britten and Skalkottas.

Maureen never felt at home in large concert venues. She performed several times at the BBC Proms in productions of Janáček's Glagolitic Mass and Stravinsky's Les Noces.

Lehane was mostly at home in Handel operas and oratorios; over the span of her career she was involved in over 100 productions of Handel's Messiah, 50 Bach cantatas and 40 St Matthew Passions.

Towards the end of her life she gave up performing, after making many recordings which perpetuate her name and reputation. She died in Great Elm.

== Great Elm Music Festival ==
While lecturing in the music department at Reading University, Lehane began inviting students for weekends at her home in Great Elm, where they performed and had picnics. Following Peter's death, Lehane felt her heart was no longer in this tradition, but the students at Reading were keen to continue. They even expanded it, and in 1986 they performed Handel's Water Music by the Mells River. The event became the 'Great Elm Music Festival' in memory of Peter. The first full-fledged such festival was held in June 1987, and others followed every year for 12 years.

At its height, it was a summer music festival spanning three weekends with 21 fully professional events held at local venues including Maureen's house, neighboring houses and a church.

== Vocal Awards ==
Maureen established a 'Great Elm Vocal Award' in 1992. Since then, it has grown into a national competition for 22-to-30-year-old singers. It was renamed in 2011 as the 'Maureen Lehane Vocal Awards' following her death. The first 'Maureen Lehane Vocal Awards' were held in October 2011, with the final in the Wigmore Hall on 21 October 2011. It included cash prizes for the top three singers, with an accompanist prize and an audience prize for the singer the audience felt should have won (decided by ballot after the performances).

The Winners of the 2017 Maureen Lehane Vocal Awards were:
1st place: (£2,000) Ema Nikolovska, mezzo-soprano
2nd place: (£1,000) Joel Williams, tenor
3rd place: (£500) Kieran Rayner, baritone
Accompanists Prize: (£1,000) João Araújo
Audience Prize: (£250) Ema Nikolovska, mezzo-soprano

The Winners of the 2016 Maureen Lehane Vocal Awards were:
1st place: (£2,000) Nardus Williams, soprano
2nd place: (£1,000) Holly Marie Bingham, mezzo-soprano
3rd place: (£500) Sam Carl, bass
Accompanist Prize: Leo Nicholson
Audience Prize: (£250) Nardus Williams, soprano

The Winners of the 2015 Maureen Lehane Vocal Awards were:
1st place: (£2,000) Julien van Mellaerts, baritone
2nd place: (£1,000) Grace Durham, mezzo-soprano
3rd place: (£500) James Newby, tenor
Accompanist Prize: jointly awarded to Edward Liddall and Natalie Burch
Audience Prize: (£250) James Newby, tenor

The Winners of the 2014 Maureen Lehane Vocal Awards were:
1st place: (£2,000) Patrick Terry, counter-tenor
2nd place: (£1,000) Henry Neill, baritone
3rd place: (£500) Timothy Nelson, baritone
Accompanist Prize: Rebecca Taylor
Audience Prize: (£250) Timothy Nelson, baritone

The Winners of the 2013 Maureen Lehane Vocal Awards were:
1st place: (£2,500) Raphaela Raphadakis, soprano
2nd place: (£1,000) Frazer B Scott, bass-baritone
3rd place: (£500 - £250 each) jointly awarded to Soraya Mafi, soprano, and Anna sideris, soprano Accompanist Prize: (£750) Chad Vindin
Audience Prize: (£250) Frazer B Scott, bass-baritone

The winners of the 2012 Maureen Lehane Vocal Awards were:
1st place: (£2,500) Andrew Dickinson, tenor
2nd place: (£1,000) Joanna Songi, soprano
3rd place: (£500) Thomas Humphreys, baritone Accompanist Prize: (£750) Matthew Fletcher
Audience Prize: (£250) Anna Anandarajah, soprano

The winners of the 2011 Maureen Lehane Vocal Awards were:
1st place: Marta Fontanals-Simmons
2nd place: Andri Bjorn Robertsson
3rd place: Ben McAteer Accompanist Prize: Timothy End
Audience Prize: Andri Bjorn Robertsson

== Jackdaws Music Education Trust ==
The Jackdaws Trust was founded in 1992. In 1993 it was supported with patronage from Dame Joan Sutherland OM, a friend of Maureen's. It is still housed in the Coach House building built by Maureen and her husband Peter next to their home in Great Elm.

== Legacy ==
Maureen Lehane died in hospital on 27 December 2010 after a long battle with multiple system atrophy a rare, life-limiting brain disease.

On 21 October 2011, the Jackdaws Music Education Trust combined the 'Maureen Lehane Vocal Awards 2011' with a Celebration Gala Concert consisting of a day of events commemorating her life and work, titled We are the Music Makers and ending with the final performances for the Maureen Lehane Vocal Awards at Wigmore Hall in the afternoon.

== See also ==
- Peter Wishart (composer)

== Sources ==
- Various; Memories of Maureen, An Appreciation by Jackdaws' Friends and fellow music lovers of Maureen's life, her work and art (Frome: Jackdaws, 2011).
- Wall, Andrew; Let the music speak (Frome: Hardington Press, 2006).
