= Ernst Ferand =

Ernst Thomas Ferand (born Ernő Freund; 5 March 1887 – 29 May 1972) was an American musicologist and music educator of Hungarian birth. He was also known as Ernest Ferand and Ernst Ferand-Freund.

== Biography ==
Ferand was born in 1887 in Budapest, Austria-Hungary. He attended the Royal National Hungarian Academy of Music and the University of Music and Performing Arts Vienna. He became interested in the methods of Émile Jaques-Dalcroze, and from 1925 to 1938 he taught at Dalcroze's Schule Hellerau-Laxenburg in Austria. In 1938 he published the influential treatise Die Improvisation in der Musik (Improvisation in Music).

He fled Europe after the Nazi annexation of Austria, finding refuge in the United States. From 1939 until 1965 Ferand was affiliated with the New School of Social Research. He wrote a number of articles which were published in The Musical Quarterly and the Journal of the American Musicological Society.

In 1974, Bruno Nettl wrote that Ferand was "the single outstanding authority in international musicology on this subject [of improvisation]." Peter Wishart described Ferand as "perhaps the most widely acknowledged authority on the subject [of improvisation in Western music.]"

Ferand died on May 29, 1972, in Basel, Switzerland.

== Bibliography ==
=== Books ===
- (1938). Die Improvisation in der Musik: eine entwicklungsgeschichtliche und psychologische Untersuchung. Zürich: Rhein-Verlag.
- (1956). Die Improvisation; in Beispielen aus neun Jahrhunderten abendländischer Musik (Improvisation in Nine Centuries of Western Music). Köln: A. Volk Verlag.
- (1957). "Improvisation", die Musik in Geschichte und Gegenwart (Encyclopedia) vol. 6, Kassel; Basel: Bärenreiter. pp. 1093-1135.
- (1961). Improvisation in nine centuries of western music; an anthology with a historical introduction. Köln: Arno Volk Verlag. Series: Das Musikwerk (Anthology of music), no. 12.

=== Articles ===
- Ernst Th. Ferand (July 1939). "The "Howling In Seconds" of the Lombards". The Musical Quarterly. 25 (3): 313–324. doi:10.1093/mq/xxv.3.313.
- Ernst T. Ferand (1940). "Improvisation in Music History and Education". Papers of the American Musicological Society: 115–125.
- Ernst T. Ferand (July 1941). "Two Unknown "Frottole"". The Musical Quarterly. 27 (3): 319–328. doi:10.1093/mq/xxvii.3.319.
- Ernst T. Ferand (Oct 1942). "In Memoriam: Fernando Liuzzi". The Musical Quarterly. 28 (4): 494–504. doi:10.1093/mq/xxviii.4.494.
- Ernest T. Ferand (Apr 1949). "Review: The Technique of Variation. A study of the Instrumental Variation from Antonio de Cabezón to Max Reger by Robert U. Nelson". The Musical Quarterly. 35 (2): 331–334. doi:10.1093/mq/xxxv.2.331.
- Ernest T. Ferand (Jan 1951). ""Sodaine and Unexpected" Music in the Renaissance". The Musical Quarterly. 37 (1): 10–27. doi:10.1093/mq/xxxvii.1.10.
- Ernest T. Ferand (Dec 1951). "Internationale Gesellschaft für Musikwissenschaft, Vierter Kongress, Basel, 29. Juni bis 3". Notes. Second Series. 9 (1): 126–127. doi:10.2307/890494. JSTOR 890494.
- E. T. Ferand (1956). "Improvised Vocal Counterpoint in the Late Renaissance and Early Baroque". Annales musicologiques (4): 129–174.
- Ernest T. Ferand (Autumn 1957). "What Is "Res Facta"?". Journal of the American Musicological Society. 10 (3): 141–150. doi:10.1525/jams.1957.10.3.03a00020.
- Ernest T. Ferand (Jan 1958). "Embellished "Parody Canatatas" in the Early 18th Century". The Musical Quarterly. 44 (1): 40–64. doi:10.1093/mq/xliv.1.40.
