= Rampelberg =

Rampelberg is a surname.

Notable people with the surname Rampelberg include:

- Charles Rampelberg (1909 –1982), French cyclist
- Chelenge Van Rampelberg (born 1961), Kenyan sculptor
- Geert Van Rampelberg (born 1975), Belgian actor
