= Sky Arts Awards =

Annual accolade recognising British achievements in the arts

- Awarded for: British and Irish achievements in the arts
- Date: 17 September 2024
- Location: Roundhouse, London
- Country: United Kingdom
- Hosted by: Joe Lycett
- Formerly called: The South Bank Show Awards; The South Bank Sky Arts Awards
- First award: 1997; 29 years ago
- Website: skyartsawards.sky

Television/radio coverage
- Network: ITV (1997–2010); Sky Arts (2011–present)

The Sky Arts Awards (formerly The South Bank Show Awards and The South Bank Sky Arts Awards) are an accolade recognising British and Irish achievements in the arts. The awards have been given annually since 1997.

They originated with the long-running British arts programme The South Bank Show and Melvyn Bragg, who has served as patron, host and master of ceremonies of the awards until his retirement from the show in late 2023.

The last South Bank Show Awards ceremony to be broadcast by ITV was in January 2010 and was held at The Dorchester hotel in London. After the network announced that The South Bank Show would be cancelled at the end of the 2009 season, the awards ceremony continued to be broadcast by Sky Arts and was eventually renamed the South Bank Sky Arts Awards. Sky Arts revived The South Bank Show itself in 2012.

In 2024, the ceremony's name was simplified after the final season of The South Bank Show in 2023. Although press releases refer to these as the inaugural Sky Arts Awards, the categories remained unchanged from previous ceremonies, although two new ones were added, namely Poetry and Arts Hero, the latter an award dedicated to celebrating the unsung heroes whose work behind the scenes in the arts sector is invaluable.

== Award categories ==
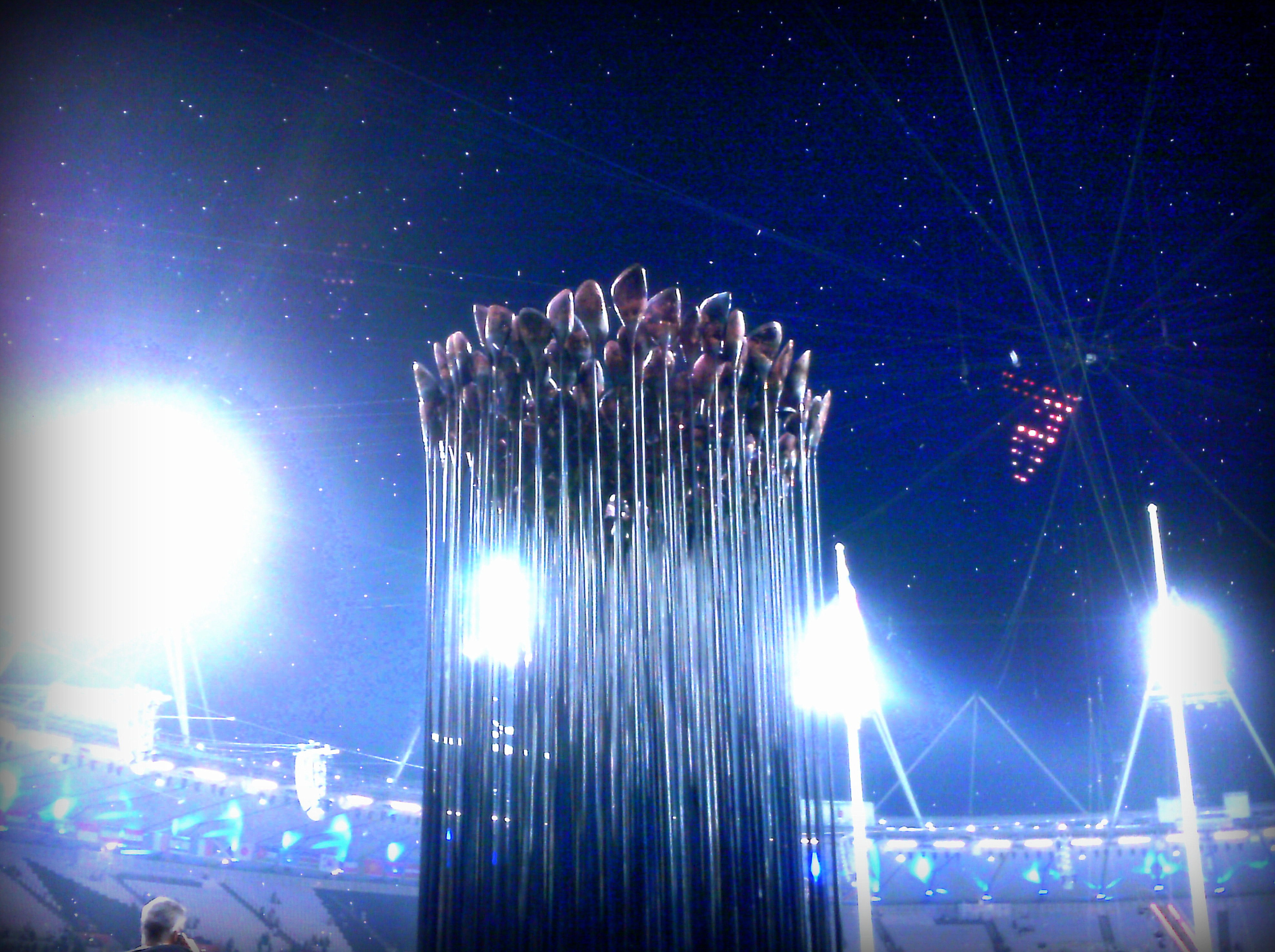
The 2012 Summer Olympics and Paralympics cauldron, winner of the South Bank Sky Arts Award for Visual Art, March 2013

In addition to awards in each of the individual categories, the Sky Arts Awards also include the Outstanding Achievement in the Arts Award recognising lifetime contributions to the arts in Britain, and the Times Breakthrough Award recognising outstanding new British talent. The latter being the only category that is decided by a public vote. Past winners of the Outstanding Achievement in the Arts Award include Julie Walters (2013), Michael Frayn (2012), Dame Judi Dench (2011), JK Rowling (2008), and The Who (2007).

Between 2004 and 2010, the Arts Council England deciBel Award (latterly the Arts Council England Diversity Award) found a home at the ceremony. Winners included Roy Williams for Fallout (2004), Neil Biswas for Bradford Riots (2007), Daljit Nagra for Look We Have Coming To Dover! (2008), and Julie McNamara (2010).

Later between 2013 and 2016, the ceremony was used as the platform to announce the winners of the Sky Academy Arts Scholarships.

As of the 28th annual ceremony (broadcast September 2024), there were 14 award categories:

- Visual Arts
- Theatre
- Dance
- Literature
- Popular Music
- Opera
- Comedy
- Poetry
- Classical Music
- TV Drama
- Film
- Times Breakthrough Award
- Lifetime Achievement Award
- Arts Hero

== 2024 awards (28th annual ceremony) ==
With The South Bank Show no longer being broadcast, this year saw the ceremony rebranded to simply The Sky Arts Awards. Shortlisted nominees were announced on 25 July 2024. This year's trophy, in the form of a bronze, was designed by Vic Reeves. A new award for Arts Hero was launched in this year to recognise the unsung heroes who work tirelessly behind the scenes to make the arts possible. The shortlist was up drawn from nominees suggested by the arts community. Melvyn Bragg was given a lifetime achievement award in recognition of his sixty years as champion of the arts.

Presented: 17 September 2024 by Joe Lycett at the Roundhouse, London
Visual Arts	Theatre	Dance
Winner – Lindsey Mendick: Sh*tfaced; Soheila Sokhanvari: Rebel Rebel; Steve McQueen: Grenfell	Winner – Ryan Calais Cameron (body of work); @sohoplace (body of work); Sherman Theatre (body of work)	Winner – Boy Blue (Kenrick "H2O" Sandy & Michael "Mikey J" Asante) - body of work; Clod Ensemble: The Black Saint and the Sinner Lady; Michael Keegan-Dolan: How To Be A Dancer in Seventy-Two Thousand Easy Lessons
Literature	Popular Music	Opera
Winner – The Bee Sting : Paul Murray; Knife: Meditations After an Attempted Murder : Salman Rushdie; Soldier Sailor : Claire Kilroy	Winner – The Last Dinner Party: Prelude to Ecstasy; Cleo Sol (body of work); Dave & Central Cee: Sprinter	Winner – Death in Venice : Welsh National Opera and Nofit State Circus; Wozzeck: Royal Opera House; English National Opera (body of work)
Comedy	Classical Music	TV Drama
Winner – Fern Brady (body of work); Blindboy Boatclub: The Blindboy Podcast; Julia Masli: ha ha ha ha ha ha ha	Winner – James MacMillan: The Cumnock Tryst 2023; Anoushka Shankar: Chapter II: How Dark it is Before Dawn; Richard Blackford: Songs of Nadia Anjuman	Winner – Mr Bates vs The Post Office; Once Upon a Time in Northern Ireland; The Sixth Commandment
Film	The Times Breakthrough Award	Poetry
Winner – How To Have Sex; All of Us Strangers; Occupied City	Winner – Aigul Akhmetshina: Opera; Ben Goldscheider: Classical Music; Ania Magliano: Comedy; Jemima Brown: Dance; Savanah Leaf: Film; Kaliane Bradley: Literature; Ella Frears: Poetry; Kneecap: Popular Music; Adjani Salmon: Television; Ben Weatherill: Theatre; Claudette Johnson: Visual Arts	Winner – Momtaza Mehri: Bad Diaspora Poems; Karen McCarthy Woolf and Nathalie Teitler: editors, Mapping the Future anthology; Jackie Kay: May Day
Arts Hero		Outstanding Achievement in the Arts
Winner – Sally Spencer (Singer): Ex Cathedra and leukaemia nurse at Birmingham Children's Hospital; Graham Johnson (Producer): Tobacco Factory Theatre, Bristol; Mikei Hall (Senior Art Handling Technician): Tate Britain, London; Yvonne O'Donovan (Administrator): Creu Cymru, Wales; Linda Hogg (Head of Customer Services & Front of House): Capital Theatres, Edinburgh		Winner – Melvyn Bragg

== 2023 awards (27th annual ceremony) ==
Shortlisted nominees were announced on 15 June 2023. This year's trophy, in the form of a porcelain cat, was designed by former winner Grayson Perry.

Presented: 2 July 2023 at the Savoy Hotel, London
Visual Arts	Theatre	Dance
Winner – Lynette Yiadom-Boakye: Fly in League with the Night (Tate Britain); Hew Locke: The Procession (Tate Britain); Mohammed Sami: The Point 0 (Camden Arts Centre)	Winner – Prima Facie: Harold Pinter Theatre; Blues for an Alabama Sky: Royal National Theatre; A Streetcar Named Desire: Almeida Theatre	Winner – Light of Passage: The Royal Ballet; Say It Loud: Ballet Black; Coppélia: Scottish Ballet
Literature	Pop Music	Opera
Winner – The New Life: Tom Crewe; My Name Is Yip: Paddy Crewe; The Exhibitionist: Charlotte Mendelson	Winner – Raye: My 21st Century Blues; Kojey Radical: Reason To Smile; Arctic Monkeys: The Car	Winner – The Rhinegold: English National Opera; Violet: Britten Pears Arts and Music Theatre Wales for the Aldeburgh Festival; The Makropulos Affair: Welsh National Opera
Comedy	Classical Music	TV Drama
Winner – Big Boys: Roughcut Television / Channel 4; Derry Girls: Hat Trick Productions / Channel 4; Jordan Gray: Is it a Bird?	Winner – Gavin Higgins' Concerto Grosso for Brass Band and Orchestra: The Tredegar Band with BBC National Orchestra of Wales, BBC Proms; Hive; Sally Beamish: BBC National Orchestra of Wales with Catrin Finch (harp), BBC Proms; The Oracle: Manchester Collective & Abel Selaocoe	Winner – Happy Valley: Lookout Point TV / BBC One; The English: Drama Republic & Eight Rooks for Amazon & BBC; Sherwood: House Productions / BBC One
Film	The Times Breakthrough Award	Outstanding Achievement in the Arts
Winner – Aftersun; Ali & Ava; The Wonder	Winner – Dance : Musa Motha; Comedy: Leo Reich; TV Drama: Leo Woodall; Literature: Louise Kennedy; Opera: Freddie De Tommaso; Classical: Sophie Kauer; Visual Art: Rana Begum; Theatre: Rosie Sheehy; Film: Raine Allen-Miller; Pop: Jockstrap	Winner – Salman Rushdie (author)

== 2022 awards (26th annual ceremony) ==
Shortlisted nominees were announced on 30 June 2022.

Presented: 10 July 2022 at the Savoy Hotel, London
Visual Arts	Theatre	Dance
Winner — Michael Armitage: Paradise Edict (Royal Academy of Arts); Rachel Whiteread: Internal Objects (Gagosian); Hurvin Anderson: Reverb (Thomas Dane Gallery)	Winner – Best of Enemies: A Young Vic and Headlong co-production; The Walk: The Walk Productions in association with Handspring Puppet Company and Good Chance Theatre; Cabaret at the Kit Kat Club	Winner – The Dante Project: Wayne McGregor, The Royal Ballet; Then or Now: Ballet Black; Starstruck: Scottish Ballet
Literature	Pop Music	Opera
Winner – Love Marriage: Monica Ali; Burntcoat: Sarah Hall; Open Water: Caleb Azumah Nelson	Winner – Little Simz: Sometimes I Might Be Introvert; Sam Fender: Seventeen Going Under; Self Esteem: Prioritise Pleasure	Winner – Rigoletto: Opera North; Bluebeard's Castle: Theatre of Sound; Wagner's RhineGold: Birmingham Opera Company
Comedy	Classical Music	TV Drama
Winner – We Are Lady Parts, Channel 4; Starstruck (series 1), BBC One; Alma's Not Normal, BBC Two	Winner – Huw Watkins' Symphony No.2: The Hallé; Dani Howard – Trombone Concerto: Royal Liverpool Philharmonic Orchestra; Up for Grabs, Mark-Anthony Turnage: BBC Symphony Orchestra, Barbican	Winner – It's A Sin: Red Production Company for Channel 4 and HBO Max in association with All3Media International; Time: BBC Studios for BBC One; This Is Going To Hurt: Sister / Terrible Productions for BBC One
Film	The Times Breakthrough Award	Outstanding Achievement in the Arts
Winner – Passing; After Love; Boiling Point	Winner – Comedy: Liz Kingsman; Classical Music: Dani Howard; Dance: Emily Suzuki; Film: Emilia Jones; Literature: Catriona Ward; Opera: Nardus Williams; Pop: Wet Leg; Theatre: Samuel Creasey; TV Drama: Gabrielle Creevy; Visual Art: Rachel Jones	Winner — Tamara Rojo (for her 10 highly regarded, transformational years as artistic director of English National Ballet)

== 2021 awards (25th annual ceremony) ==
The 25th annual ceremony marked its return as an in-person event after COVID-19 related restrictions of the previous year with shortlisted nominees announced on 7 June 2021. Two special awards were bestowed this year for innovation in the arts during the pandemic: one for an individual and one for a group / institution.

Presented: 19 July 2021 at the Savoy Hotel, London
Visual Arts	Theatre	Dance
Winner – Denzil Forrester: Itchin & Scratchin, Nottingham Contemporary & Spike Island; Hold Still: National Portrait Gallery; Cold War Steve Meets The Outside World: Medway / Bournemouth / Liverpool / Coventry	Winner – Uncle Vanya (2020 film): Harold Pinter Theatre / BBC Four; Pass Over: Kiln Theatre; Blindness: Donmar Warehouse	Winner – Scherzo: The Royal Ballet; Lazuli Sky: Birmingham Royal Ballet; Final Edition: Richard Alston Dance Company
Literature	Pop Music	Opera
Winner – Hamnet: Maggie O'Farrell; Shuggie Bain: Douglas Stuart; Rainbow Milk: Paul Mendez	Winner – Dua Lipa: Future Nostalgia; J Hus: Big Conspiracy; SAULT: Untitled (Black Is)	Winner – L'enfant et les sortilèges, VOPERA; Street Scene, Opera North; Nixon in China, Scottish Opera
Comedy	Classical Music	TV Drama
Winner – Ghosts (series 2), Monumental Television / BBC One; Home (series 2): Jantaculum / Channel X / Channel 4; Feel Good: Objective Fiction & Objective Media Group Scotland / Channel 4 / Netflix	Winner – Petrenko's Mahler I & II: Royal Liverpool Philharmonic Orchestra; Lawrence Power: The Lockdown Commissions; Second Ragged Music Festival: Ragged School Museum	Winner – I May Destroy You: BBC One / HBO; Small Axe: BBC One; Industry: Bad Wolf / BBC / HBO
Film	The Times Breakthrough Award	Outstanding Achievement in the Arts
Winner – Rocks; Saint Maud; His House	Winner – Theatre: Samuel Bailey; Classical Music: Mishka Rushdie Momen; Comedy: The Pin; Dance: Arielle Smith; Film: Nick Rowland; Literature: Marina Kemp; Opera: Alex Woolf; Pop: Arlo Parks; TV Drama: Noah Jupe; Visual Art: Alberta Whittle	Winner – Grayson Perry (artist, writer and broadcaster)
Innovation in the arts during the pandemic
Winner: Group / Institution— Wigmore Hall for leading the way in transmission of live performance by exceptional performers; Winner: Individual – Sam Mendes for the Theatre Artists Fund

== 2020 awards (24th annual ceremony) ==
Nominations were revealed on 23 November 2020. Due to COVID-19 restrictions the ceremony itself was a virtual event and took place in the winter instead of its usual summertime slot.

Presented: 10 December 2020 at the London Coliseum
Visual Arts	Theatre	Dance
Winner – Steve McQueen: Year 3 (Tate Britain and billboards across London); Tracey Emin: A Fortnight of Tears (White Cube, Bermondsey); Martin Parr: Only Human (National Portrait Gallery)	Winner – Standing at the Sky's Edge: Crucible Theatre, Sheffield; Life of Pi: Crucible Theatre, Sheffield; Cyrano de Bergerac: Playhouse Theatre	Winner – Victoria: Northern Ballet; Ingoma: Ballet Black; Matthew Bourne's Romeo and Juliet: A New Adventures Production
Literature	Pop Music	Opera
Winner – Girl: Edna O'Brien; The Confessions of Frannie Langton: Sara Collins; On Chapel Sands: My Mother and Other Missing Persons: Laura Cumming	Winner – Dave: Psychodrama; Kano: Hoodies All Summer; Michael Kiwanuka: Kiwanuka	Winner – Katya Kabanova: The Royal Opera; Lady Macbeth of Mtsensk: Birmingham Opera Company; Iolanta: Opera Holland Park
Comedy	Classical Music	TV Drama
Winner – Fleabag: BBC Three and Amazon Prime Video / Two Brothers Pictures; Sex Education: Netflix / Eleven Film; Home: Jantaculum / Channel X for Channel 4	Winner – Thea Musgrave Trumpet Concerto: Cheltenham Music Festival / City of Birmingham Symphony Orchestra; Götterdämmerung, Edinburgh International Festival: Sir Andrew Davis and the Royal Scottish National Orchestra; Thomas Adès Concerto for Piano and Orchestra: London Philharmonic Orchestra	Winner – Chernobyl: Sister / The Mighty Mint / Word Games / Sky Atlantic / HBO; The Virtues: Warp Films / Big Arty Productions / Channel 4; Years and Years: Red Production Company and HBO for BBC One
Film	The Times Breakthrough Award	Outstanding Achievement in the Arts
Winner – The Souvenir; Rocketman; For Sama	Winner – Film: Waad Al-Kateab; Classical Music: Jess Gillam; Comedy: London Hughes; Dance: Paris Fitzpatrick; Literature: Candice Carty-Williams; Opera: Rowan Pierce; Pop: Beabadoobee; Theatre: Miriam-Teak Lee; TV Drama: Dafne Keen; Visual Art: Michael Armitage	Winner – Ian McKellen (actor)

== 2019 awards (23rd annual ceremony) ==
Nominations were revealed on 3 June 2019.

Presented: 7 July 2019 at the Savoy Hotel, London
Visual Arts	Theatre	Dance
Winner – 14—18 NOW / Danny Boyle: Pages of the Sea; Tacita Dean: The exhibitions, Landscape; Portrait; Still Life and Woman with a Red Hat; Royal Academy of Arts 250th Summer Exhibition: co-ordinated by Grayson Perry	Winner – The Inheritance: Young Vic & Noël Coward Theatre; Company: Gielgud Theatre; Sweat: Donmar Warehouse	Winner – Playlist (Track 1, 2) by William Forsythe, English National Ballet; Corybantic Games by Christopher Wheeldon, The Royal Ballet; XENOS: Akram Khan Company
Literature	Pop Music	Opera
Winner – Ordinary People: Diana Evans; The Italian Teacher: Tom Rachman; Kudos: Rachel Cusk	Winner – Lily Allen: No Shame; Sons of Kemet: Your Queen is a Reptile; IDLES: Joy as an Act of Resistance	Winner – Porgy and Bess: English National Opera; Rhondda Rips It Up!: Welsh National Opera; Falstaff: Garsington Opera
Comedy	Classical Music	TV Drama
Winner – Derry Girls: Hat Trick Productions / Channel 4; Inside No. 9: BBC Studios / BBC Two; Hang Ups: SLAM Films / Channel 4	Winner – Debussy Festival: City of Birmingham Symphony Orchestra; Bernstein Centenary: John Wilson; Cumnock Tryst	Winner – A Very English Scandal: Blueprint Pictures / BBC One; Patrick Melrose: Little Island Productions / Two Cities Television / Sunny March / Sky Atlantic; Killing Eve: Sid Gentle Films / BBC One
Film	The Times Breakthrough Award	Outstanding Achievement in the Arts
Winner – The Favourite; Beast; They Shall Not Grow Old	Winner – Film: Jessie Buckley; Classical Music: Alpesh Chauhan; Comedy: Jessie Cave; Dance: Joseph Sissens; Literature: Anna-Marie Crowhurst; Opera: Nadine Benjamin; Pop: Freya Ridings; Theatre: Toby Marlow and Lucy Moss; TV Drama: Chance Perdomo; Visual Art: Haroon Mirza	Winner – Sir Lenny Henry (comedian)

== 2018 awards (22nd annual ceremony) ==
Nominations were revealed on 29 May 2018.

Presented: 1 July 2018 at the Savoy Hotel, London
Visual Arts	Theatre	Dance
Winner – Rose Wylie: Quack Quack, Serpentine Sackler Gallery; Mat Collishaw: Thresholds, Somerset House; Paula Rego: The Boy Who Loved the Sea and Other Stories, Jerwood Gallery	Winner – The Jungle: A Young Vic and National Theatre co-production with Good Chance Theatre; The Ferryman: Royal Court / Gielgud Theatre; Follies: National Theatre	Winner – Maliphantworks: Russell Maliphant Company; Flight Pattern: The Royal Ballet; Pina Bausch's Le Sacre du printemps (The Rite of Spring): English National Ballet
Literature	Pop Music	Opera
Winner – Ma'am Darling: 99 Glimpses of Princess Margaret: Craig Brown; Home Fire: Kamila Shamsie; The Book of Dust:La Belle Sauvage: Philip Pullman	Winner – Stormzy: Gang Signs & Prayer; Loyle Carner: Yesterday's Gone; Dua Lipa: Dua Lipa	Winner – Hamlet: Glyndebourne; Pelléas and Mélisande: Scottish Opera; Albert Herring: The Grange Festival
Comedy	Classical Music	TV Drama
Winner – Inside No. 9: BBC Two; Catastrophe: Channel 4; This Country: BBC Three	Winner – Gurrelieder: BBC Philharmonic and The Hallé; Enescu's Oedipe: London Philharmonic Orchestra; This is Rattle: London Symphony Orchestra	Winner – Howards End: Playground / BBC One; Line of Duty: World Productions / BBC One; The Crown: Left Bank Pictures / Netflix
Film	The Times Breakthrough Award	Outstanding Achievement in the Arts
Winner – Paddington 2; Lady Macbeth; Dunkirk	Winner – Pop: Nubya Garcia; Classical Music: Oliver Zeffman; Comedy: Sophie Willan; Dance: Dickson Mbi; Film: Francis Lee; Literature: Imogen Hermes Gowar; Opera: Rachel Redmond; Theatre: Monica Dolan; TV Drama: Alex Lawther; Visual Art: Heather Agyepong	Winner – Benedict Cumberbatch (actor)

== 2017 awards (21st annual ceremony) ==
Nominations were revealed on 6 June 2017

Presented: 9 July 2017 at the Savoy Hotel, London
Visual Arts	Theatre	Dance
Winner – Artangel: Inside: Artists and Writers in Reading Prison; John Akomfrah: Vertigo Sea; George Shaw: My Back to Nature	Winner – Harry Potter and the Cursed Child: Palace Theatre; The Shakespeare Trilogy: Donmar at King's Cross; Yerma: Young Vic	Winner – Akram Khan's Giselle: English National Ballet; An Italian in Madrid: Richard Alston Dance Company; Jane Eyre: Northern Ballet
Literature	Pop Music	Opera
Winner – The Gustav Sonata: Rose Tremain; The Return: Fathers, Sons and the Land in Between: Hisham Matar; Swing Time: Zadie Smith	Winner – David Bowie: Blackstar; The 1975: I like it when you sleep, for you are so beautiful yet so unaware of it; Skepta: Konnichiwa	Winner – Wagner: Der Ring des Nibelungen (The Ring Cycle), Opera North; 4.48 Psychosis: Royal Opera House; Nothing: Glyndebourne Youth Opera
Comedy	Classical Music	TV Drama
Winner – Fleabag: BBC Three; Camping: Sky Atlantic; People Just Do Nothing: BBC Three	Winner – Stravinsky: Myths & Rituals, Philharmonia Orchestra; Tom Coult: Spirit of the Staircase, London Sinfonietta / Martyn Brabbins; Monteverdi: Vespers, Dunedin Consort: Lammermuir	Winner – Happy Valley: BBC One; National Treasure: Channel 4; The Crown: Netflix
Film	The Times Breakthrough Award	Outstanding Achievement in the Arts
Winner – I, Daniel Blake; American Honey; Under the Shadow	Winner – Classical: Sheku Kanneh-Mason; Comedy: Kieran Hodgson; Dance: Vidya Patel; Film: Lewis MacDougall; Literature: Joseph Knox; Opera: Natalya Romaniw; Pop Music: Sampha; Theatre: Kate O'Flynn; TV Drama: Malachi Kirby; Visual Art: Rachel Kneebone	Winner – Andrew Lloyd Webber (theatre composer, impresario)

== 2016 awards (20th annual ceremony) ==
Nominations were revealed on 3 May 2016.

Presented: 5 June 2016 at the Savoy Hotel, London
Visual Arts	Theatre	Dance
Winner – Lynette Yiadom-Boakye: Verses After Dusk, Serpentine Gallery; Banksy: Dismaland Bemusement Park; Cornelia Parker: Magna Carta (An Embroidery), British Library	Winner – Hangmen: Jerwood Theatre Downstairs at the Royal Court Theatre; Oresteia: Almeida Theatre; People, Places and Things: National Theatre and Headlong	Winner – 1984: Northern Ballet; Paradise Lost (lies unopened beside me): Lost Dog; Woolf Works: The Royal Ballet
Literature	Pop Music	Opera
Winner – The Year of the Runaways: Sunjeev Sahota; The Past: Tessa Hadley; The Wolf Border: Sarah Hall	Winner – Benjamin Clementine: At Least For Now; Sleaford Mods: Key Markets; Years & Years: Communion	Winner – Force of Destiny, English National Opera; Krol Roger, Royal Opera House; Saul, Glyndebourne
Comedy	Classical Music	TV Drama
Winner – Catastrophe: Channel 4; Chewing Gum: E4; Peter Kay's Car Share: BBC One	Winner – Mark Simpson: The Immortal; Stephen Hough: International Piano Series, Debussy and Chopin, Royal Festival Hall; City of Birmingham Symphony Orchestra: Andris Nelsons' Farewell Concert, Symphony Hall	Winner – Doctor Foster, BBC One; Humans, Channel 4; Wolf Hall, BBC Two
Film	The Times Breakthrough Award	Outstanding Achievement in the Arts
Winner – 45 Years; Brooklyn; Ex Machina	Winner – Pop: Stormzy; Classical Music: Mark Simpson; Comedy: Romesh Ranganathan; Dance: Zizi Strallen; Film: Agyness Deyn; Literature: Barney Norris; Opera: Jennifer France; Theatre: Matt Henry; TV Drama: Michaela Coel; Visual Art: Charlotte Moth	Winner – Eddie Izzard (comedian and actor)

== Selected previous winners (1997—2015) ==
Source: West End Theatre unless otherwise stated
Visual Arts	Outstanding Achievement in the Arts
2015: Paul Cummins: Blood Swept Lands and Seas of Red; 2014: Katie Paterson: Tipping Point, Wolverhampton Art Gallery; 2013: Thomas Heatherwick: London 2012 Olympic Cauldron; 2012: Grayson Perry: Tomb of the Unknown Craftsman, British Museum; 2011: Tacita Dean: The Craneway Event, Frith Street Gallery; 2010: Anish Kapoor: retrospective exhibition, Royal Academy; 2009: Peter Doig: Tate Britain; 2008: Andy Goldsworthy: Yorkshire Sculpture Park; 2007: Gilbert & George: Sonofagod Pictures: Was Jesus Heterosexual?; 2006: John Virtue: London paintings at The National Gallery; 2005: Paula Rego: In Focus exhibition at Tate Britain; 2004: Chris Ofili: Venice Biennale; 2003: Anish Kapoor: Marsyas; 2002: Frank Auerbach: retrospective at the Royal Academy; 2001: Norman Foster: Great Court of the British Museum; 2000: Gary Hulme: exhibition at the Whitechapel Gallery; 1999: Anthony Gormley: Angel of the North; 1998: ?; 1997: ?	2015: Sylvie Guillem, dancer, choreographer; 2014: Tracey Emin, artist; 2013: Julie Walters, actress; 2012: Michael Frayn, writer; 2011: Judi Dench, actress; 2010: Melvyn Bragg, TV presenter; 2009: Cameron Mackintosh, theatre producer; 2008: J. K. Rowling, author; 2007: The Who, rock group; 2006: Richard Attenborough, film director; 2005: Paul Abbott, scriptwriter; 2004: Helen Mirren, actress; 2003: Tom Stoppard, playwright; 2002: Bernard Haitink, conductor; 2001: Harold Pinter, playwright; 2000: Cliff Richard, pop singer; 1999: Simon Rattle, conductor; 1998: ?; 1997: Richard Eyre, theatre director
Literature	Theatre
2015: Henry Marsh: Do No Harm: Stories of Life, Death and Brain Surgery; 2014: Kate Atkinson: Life after Life; 2013: Hilary Mantel: Bring Up The Bodies; 2012: Claire Tomalin: Charles Dickens: A Life; 2011: Candia McWilliam: What to Look for in Winter: A Memoir in Blindness; 2010: Adam Foulds: The Quickening Maze; 2009: Linda Grant: The Clothes on their Backs; 2008: Mohsin Hamid: The Reluctant Fundamentalist; 2007: Edward St Aubyn: Mother's Milk; 2006: John McGahern: Memoir; 2005: David Mitchell: Cloud Atlas; 2004: Mark Haddon: The Curious Incident of the Dog in the Night-Time; 2003: Sarah Waters: Fingersmith; 2002: Ian McEwan: Atonement; 2001: Peter Ackroyd: London: The Biography; 2000: Seamus Heaney: Beowulf; 1999: Ted Hughes: Birthday Letters; 1998: ?; 1997: Seamus Deane: Reading in the Dark	2015: King Charles III (Almeida Theatre / Wyndham's Theatre); 2014: Let The Right One In (National Theatre of Scotland); 2013: The Curious Incident of the Dog in the Night-Time (National Theatre); 2012: Matilda, Royal Shakespeare Company (Cambridge Theatre); 2011: Clybourne Park (Royal Court); 2010: Rachel Weisz: A Streetcar Named Desire (Donmar Warehouse); 2009: Othello (Donmar Warehouse); 2008: Saint Joan (National Theatre); 2007: Black Watch (Traverse Theatre); 2006: Mary Stuart (Donmar Warehouse & Apollo Theatre); 2005: Nicholas Hytner: The History Boys (National Theatre); 2004: Michael Frayn: Democracy (National Theatre); 2003: Sam Mendes: Twelfth Night & Uncle Vanya (Donmar Warehouse); 2002: This England: The Histories (Royal Shakespeare Company); 2001: Michael Grandage: As You Like It; 2000: Trevor Nunn: Summerfolk (National Theatre); 1999: Michael Frayn: Copenhagen; 1998: Jonathan Kent: Ivanov; 1997: Diana Rigg & David Suchet: Who's Afraid of Virginia Wolfe?

== See also ==
- List of European art awards
