= Nairobi Contemporary Art Institute =

Nairobi Contemporary Art Institute (NCAI) is a nonprofit contemporary art institution in Nairobi, Kenya. Established in 2020 by Kenyan-British artist Michael Armitage, it opened its exhibition space in January 2022. The institute organizes exhibitions of contemporary art in East Africa, as well as an art archive and public education programs.

== History ==
The institute was first conceived by Armitage, Mukami Kuria and other artists who recognized the need for non-commercial visual arts and educational spaces in Nairobi. In 2017, Armitage and Kuria organized The Gathering, an event attended by 52 artists from 12 African countries. This event contributed to the establishment of NCAI in 2020.

The institute opened in January 2022 with I Hope So, a survey of paintings by Kenyan artist Sane Wadu dating from the mid-1980s onward. The exhibition included archival photographs and newspaper articles documenting Wadu's career and his involvement in the Ngecha Artists Association, which he co-founded in 1995.

NCAI was initially located in a commercial building in Nairobi's Rosslyn area. Its activities include exhibitions, public talks, educational programs and the development of an East African art archive.

== Exhibitions and programs ==
In October 2022, NCAI opened Mwili, Akili na Roho, an exhibition of figurative painting by ten East African artists curated by Don Handa. In 2023, Handa curated Common Ground, featuring work by Peterson Kamwathi, Paul Njihia, Elias Mung'ora and Morris Foit. The exhibition addressed land use and ownership through painting, sculpture and mixed-media works.

In 2024, the institute presented 60 Years, an exhibition of modern and contemporary East African art spanning six decades. Curated also by Handa, the exhibition included works by artists from different generations and pulled from the institute’s permanent collection.

NCAI has also collaborated with international institutions. In 2026, it presented Michael Armitage, Maria Lassnig, Chelenge Van Rampelberg, an exhibition previously shown at Kunsthaus Bregenz in Austria. The Nairobi segment included drawings and lithographs by Armitage, drawings by Lassnig, and prints and sculptures by Van Rampelberg.

== Collection and archive ==
The institute maintains a permanent collection of primarily East African art dating from the 1960s onward. NCAI is also developing an art library and an archive of exhibition records, publications and writings centering artists working in the East African region.
