= Michael Armitage (artist) =

Kenyan artist

- Born: 1984 (age 41–42); Nairobi, Kenya

Michael Armitage (born 1984) is a British artist who was born in Kenya. In May 2022, the Royal Mint announced that he would design a new £1 coin for the United Kingdom, to be issued in 2023.

== Early life ==
Armitage was born in Nairobi to an English father from Yorkshire who worked as an accountant, and a Kenyan mother of Kikuyu ancestry who sold handmade clothing. He grew up in Nairobi, living there until he was 16. He began drawing at age 6, and a few years later he was encouraged by his art teacher to continue with art. As he grew older he spent much time at the studio of sculptor Chelenge Van Rampelberg, whom he knew as the mother of one of his friends.

At age 16, Armitage left Kenya to attend boarding school in England. He then attended the Slade School of Fine Art, London, where he was sometimes at odds with some of his teachers, whom he felt were patronizing or condescending when discussing East African art. He graduated with a BA degree in 2007.

He earned a Postgraduate Diploma from the Royal Academy Schools, London in 2010.

== Career ==
Armitage began as an abstract painter. In 2014, Armitage began to paint on lubugo, a Ugandan ficus tree bark cloth, rather than traditional canvas. One of these early lubugo paintings was Kampala Suburb, which depicts two men kissing "in the style of an Egyptian hieroglyphic". Armitage painted the piece after speaking to one of his sister's friends about the friend's experience as a gay man in Kenya, where homosexuality is illegal. Although Armitage attempted to exhibit the piece in Nairobi, he was unsuccessful, as the art centre he was working with was uncomfortable with the subject matter.

Also that year, a director at London's White Cube Gallery found Armitage's work in a book about emerging painters ('100 Painters of Tomorrow' by Kurt Beers, with an essay by Gregor Muir, then ICA London, Executive Director). His work began to draw attention after he joined White Cube gallery in 2015 and was included in several group exhibitions that year. In 2016, Armitage had his first solo exhibition in the United States at the University of California's Berkeley Art Museum and Pacific Film Archive.

In 2019, his work was included in the 58th Venice Biennale. That same year, Armitage had a solo show of his work at the Museum of Contemporary Art in Sydney, Australia. In November 2019, one of Armitage's works, "The Conservationists" (2015), was brought to auction at Sotheby's, making it the first of Armitage's paintings to be auctioned; it sold for more than US$1.5 million.

In 2020, Armitage had a solo show of eight of his paintings at the Museum of Modern Art in New York City, and his first exhibition in Africa at the Norval Foundation in Cape Town, South Africa, which was cut short due to the COVID-19 pandemic. The same year, he exhibited 27 of his paintings, as well as drawings and lithographs, in a show at Munich's Haus der Kunst entitled Paradise Edict. Armitage also selected 70 works by 20th-century figurative East African artists to be included in the show. A scaled-down version of the exhibition was brought to the Royal Academy of Arts in 2021.

In 2020, Armitage also founded the non-profit Nairobi Contemporary Art Institute, which aims to promote contemporary art in the city.

During the COVID-19 pandemic, Armitage began painting en plein air.

In May 2022, the Royal Mint announced that he would design a new £1 coin for the United Kingdom, to be issued in 2023. Later in 2022, Armitage had an exhibition at the Swiss museum Kunsthalle Basel.

In 2023 a new auction record was set for his works with Muliro Gardens (baboons) (2016), which sold for $2.24m at Sotheby's. In May 2025, Mpeketoni (2015) sold for $2.37m, also at Sotheby's.

== Style ==
Armitage paints on lubugo cloth, rather than traditional linen canvas, in order to ground his work in East African culture and history. The cloth is made by the Baganda people of Uganda, and is traditionally used as a death shroud. It is handmade, fragile, and often contains holes, which forces Armitage to think creatively about how to place images on his canvases. The material also requires some adaptations to techniques; for example, Armitage works with thinned paint.

Armitage has also done some works on paper using ink.

Many of Armitage's works draw on African animals, landscapes, and actual events from his life or in East Africa, either historical or contemporary. He has said Kenya and Kenyans are his primary subject matter, and that he is not drawn to Britain for painting inspiration. He sometimes uses animals as stand-ins or metaphors for humans. His use of color and imagery has been compared to fauvism. He has also explored satires and spoofs of European painting tropes in his works, especially those used by European artists, such as Gauguin and Watteau, when portraying Africa and other tropical regions.

Armitage has said that his paintings take time to complete, and that he'll sit with an idea for a year or more before painting it.

Armitage's artistic inspirations include Spanish painter Francisco Goya (to whom Armitage has been positively compared), Paul Gauguin, contemporary Scottish painter Peter Doig, Ugandan artist Jak Katarikawe, and Kenyan artists Meek Gichugu and Chelenge Van Rampelberg.

== Works ==
Armitage painted a series of eight paintings on the 2017 Kenyan elections. The works were based on the artist's observations of rallies prior to the elections, and took two years to complete.

Armitage's painting, Curfew (Likoni March 27, 2020), is held by the Museum of Modern Art. The work depicts an abstracted interpretation of an actual event; on March 27, 2020, workers in Mombasa, Kenya, were beaten by the police when they were unable to board ferries home before the curfew imposed due to COVID-19. It measures 2.5 m by 3.5 m, and is painted on lubugo, or fig-tree bark cloth. Armitage painted the work during the pandemic, finishing it in 2022.

Armitage's 2020 painting, John Barry, O Kelly, Sonny and Richard Moore, was commissioned by the Southbank Centre during the COVID-19 pandemic. It depicts four refuse collectors, whom the piece is named after, as well as paramedics moving a patient into an ambulance. According to Armitage, the piece "is about community and the workers in the community that go largely unseen". In 2022, Armitage worked with weavers from West Dean College of Arts and Conservation to adapt the painting as a tapestry, which is held by the National Portrait Gallery, London.

== Honours and awards ==
In 2020, Armitage received the Ruth Baumgarte Art Award.

In 2021, he won a South Bank Sky Arts Award for visual art for his exhibition, Paradise Edict, at the Royal Academy of Arts.

In January 2022, he was elected a Royal Academician by the Royal Academy of Arts.

== Personal life ==
Armitage and his wife, who is Indonesian, have a home in West London. The couple have one daughter, who was born in 2022. Armitage has a studio in East London and a studio beside his parents' house in Kenya. He spends several months in Kenya every year.

== Collections ==
- Art Gallery of New South Wales, Sydney, Australia
- Arts Council Collection, London
- Metropolitan Museum of Art, New York
- Museum of Contemporary Art, Chicago
- National Galleries Scotland
- San Francisco Museum of Modern Art
- Zabludowicz Collection
