= Althea Efunshile =

British arts administrator

Althea Efunshile CBE
- Born: Althea Joy Barrett Efunshile; 20 August 1956 (age 69)

Althea Joy Barrett Efunshile CBE (born 20 August 1956) is a senior British public sector executive.

== Education ==
Efunshile has a bachelor's degree in sociology from the University of Essex, a PGCE from Goldsmiths, University of London and a DMS from Buckinghamshire College.

== Career ==
After various posts in teaching, youth work, and educational administration, Efunshile was executive director, education and culture, of the London Borough of Lewisham from 1996 to 2001. She then worked at the Department for Education and Skills from 2001 to 2006, as head of the Children's and Young People's Unit and then directing its Vulnerable Children Group.

In 2007 she joined Arts Council England as executive director, arts planning and investment, becoming chief operating officer 2009–2012 and then deputy chief executive from 2012. She stepped down from this post in October 2016.

In December 2016, it was reported that Efunshile had been proposed by Ofcom for a position as a non-executive director of Channel 4, but she was the only nominee rejected by the culture secretary Karen Bradley, who appointed four men to an all-white board. The chairman of the board Charles Gurassa and chief executive David Abraham also approved of Efunshile's potential appointment. David Lammy, the Labour MP and former Culture minister, said: "This is an absolutely extraordinary decision that really does beggar belief." In December 2017 it was announced that the Culture Secretary Karen Bradley had appointed Efunshile to the Channel 4 Board.

In 2016 she was the founding chair of the National College Creative Industries and she has served as a Council Member of Goldsmiths, University of London.

As of March 2020 Efunshile is Chair of Metropolitan Thames Valley Housing; a non-Executive Director of University College London Hospitals NHS Foundation Trust; a non-Executive Director of Channel 4; and Chair of Ballet Black.

== Recognition ==
Efunshile was included in Power List 2013: Britain's most influential black people. In April 2016, she was listed as number 43 in the "Top 100 BAME business leaders in the UK", a list compiled for Executive Search firm Green Park and The Sunday Times by a panel of judges comprising Green Park's Raj Tulsiani, Baroness Janet Royall, Baroness Oona King, Lord Victor Adebowale and Lord Chris Holmes. In October 2017 Efunshile was again included in the list of the "100 most influential BAME executives in Britain" compiled by Green Park.

Efunshile was appointed Commander of the Order of the British Empire (CBE) in the 2016 Birthday Honours for services to arts and culture.
