= Freed of London =

Clothing companies of England

Freed of London Ltd
- Company type: Limited company
- Founded: 1929
- Founder: Frederick Freed
- Fate: Active
- Headquarters: Leicester, England
- Area served: Worldwide
- Website: freedoflondon.com

Freed of London Ltd, often referred to simply as Freed, is a designer and manufacturer of pointe shoes and other dance shoes. The company additionally manufactures dance apparel, bridal, and fashion collections. Freed of London shoes are handcrafted in the UK, and today the brand is available in over 50 countries. While Freed began in a basement in Covent Garden, it now comprises nine retail stores, seven offices, five warehouses, and three manufacturing sites.

== History ==
Freed of London was established in 1929 by cobbler Frederick Freed, his wife, who worked as a milliner, and an assistant. Freed and his wife had both been previously employed by Gamba, a London-based dance shoe maker. After several years of work at Gamba, they decided to open workshop in the basement of a shop in Covent Garden. Freed gained his first customer by putting up a sign that said they will make a shoe to fit a ballerina, not the ballerina having to fit the shoe. Anna Pavlova & Margot Fonteyn were among the first customers of Freed of London. In 1934, production became too large for the store basement in Covent Garden, and manufacturing was moved to a small factory in Endell street. In 1947, manufacturing was once again moved due to the increasing scale of production. Freed of London transitioned its headquarters to a larger factory on Mercer Street. It was during this time that Freed started to become the prestigious and well-known company that it continues to be today. Frederick Freed retired in 1968 and the company was acquired by D H Sam Thomson Limited and Magdalan Shoes of Norwich. The three companies joined together and continued to operate as Freed of London. It was not until 1985 that Freed began manufacturing dance apparel. In 1993, the company became a wholly owned subsidiary of Japanese apparel company Onward Kashiyama (now Onword HOLDINGS(ja) in 2007). The Freed corporate headquarters and manufacturing facilities were retained after the acquisition and continue to operate at their original location in London.

Freed of London has continued to grow and expand in the past few decades. In 2012, Freed launched its first collection of Bridal shoes and opened a retail store in New York in collaboration with Chacott. A year later, in 2013, Freed released a line of ballet flats, the first instance in which the company created shoes not intended for dance purposes. In 2016, Freed of London became the first dancewear manufacturer to attain ISO accreditation. In October 2018, Freed of London became the first UK Company to create Pointe shoes for black, Asian and mixed race dancers, releasing two new Pointe shoe colours to their core collection: Ballet Brown & Ballet Bronze. These were developed for over a year with Ballet Black, a London-based Ballet company for dancers of black and Asian descent.

=== Frederick Freed ===
Frederick Freed (born 1899 - d. before 1993) was a British shoemaker, the founder of Freed of London, the manufacturer of pointe shoes and other dance shoes and apparel. Frederick Freed was born in the East End of London in 1899, the son of a sample shoemaker.

In 1929, Freed left Gamba, where he had been making ballet shoes, and opened a store and workshop in St Martin's Lane, employing his wife and an assistant. After a few years the business needed larger premises, and manufacturing was moved to a small factory in nearby Endell Street.

Freed and his wife retired in 1968. His widow sold the company in 1993.

== Manufacturing process ==
Every Freed pointe shoe is made by hand in the UK with a production based from the main factory in Hackney, East London. Two smaller production sites are based in Leicester and Norwich.

Freed pointe shoes are made using the traditional turn shoe method, with a "signature" peach-colored satin. The toe box is constructed by gluing together hand-layered triangles of hessian and paper, using a proprietary, water-based glue. After the box is formed, pleats are formed in the satin that covers the shoe and secured with metal pincers. The shoe is then stitched and the sole is joined to the upper with wax thread. Next, the pointe shoe is turned right-side-out and the insole is inserted. Finally, the box, which is not yet dried, is hammered into its final shape.

Freed of London currently employs 26 shoemakers. Freed cobblers typically devote decades of their lives to handcrafting pointe shoes. Each shoemaker makes about 50 shoes a day, most of which are custom made for individual dancers who order 20 pairs at a time from a specific, preferred maker. A letter or symbol is stamped on the sole of custom-ordered shoes to indicate the cobbler who made them.

== Visibility ==
Freed supplies pointe shoes to most famous ballet companies in the world. These include The Royal Ballet, Birmingham Royal Ballet, English National Ballet, New York City Ballet, American Ballet Theatre, Miami City Ballet, Dutch National Ballet, Paris Opera Ballet, and Pacific Northwest Ballet among others. Freed of London pointe shoes are worn by principal dancers worldwide including Sylvie Guillem, Tamara Rojo, Leanne Benjamin, Nina Ananiashvili, and Alessandra Ferri. The brand has also been featured on national UK television in both The X Factor and Dancing on Ice. Freed's items have appeared in the Harry Potter and Pirates of the Caribbean films in addition to Snow White and the Huntsman.
