= Grishko =

Russian dance apparel company

Grishko Гришко
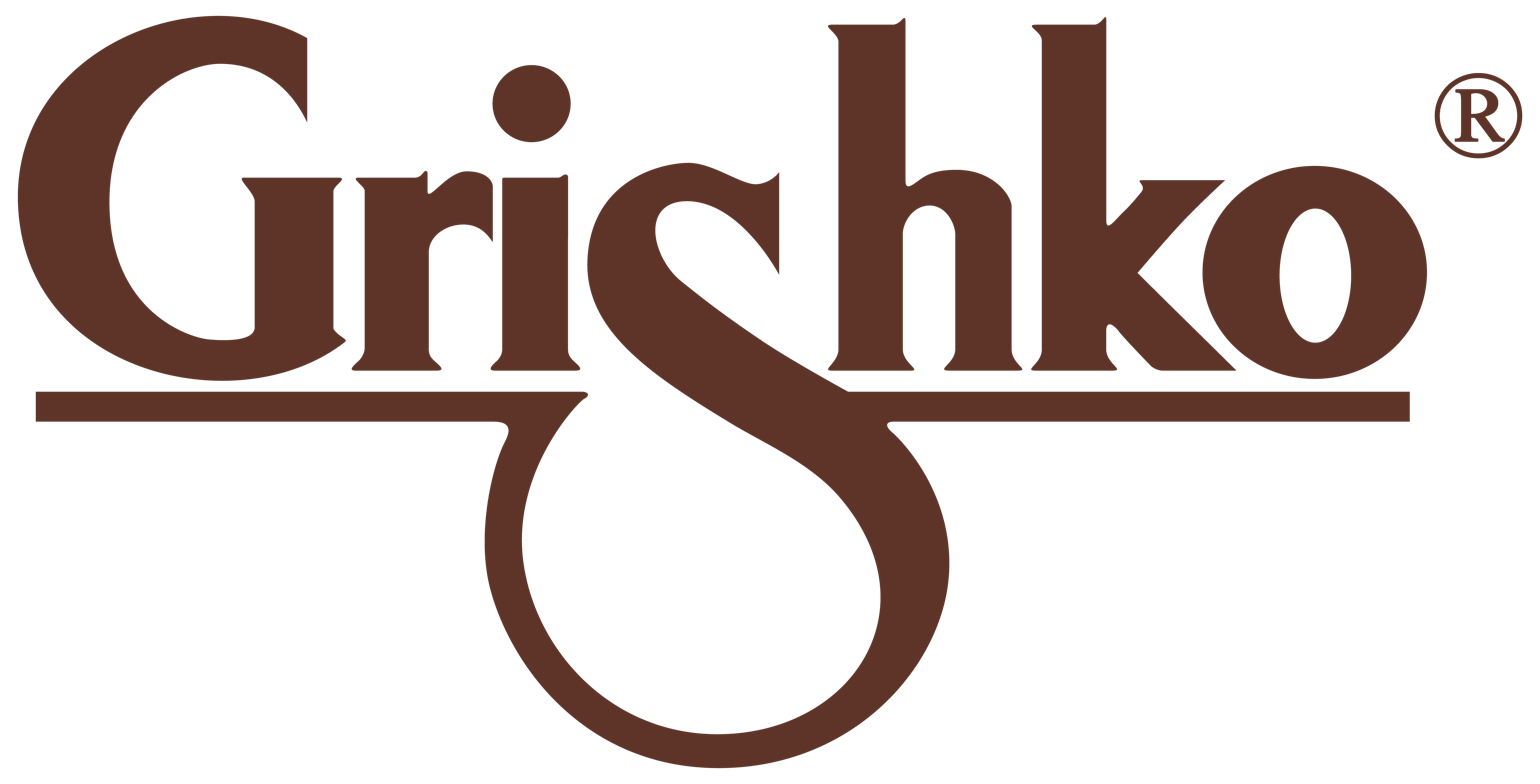
- Industry: Manufacturing
- Founded: 1989
- Founder: Nikolay Grishko
- Headquarters: Moscow, Russia
- Area served: Europe
- Products: Dance Shoes, Wear & Accessories
- Number of employees: 540
- Website: grishkoshop.com

Grishko Ltd. (Russian: Гришко) is a privately held manufacturer of dance shoes, apparel and accessories. The company was founded in 1989 by Nikolay Grishko in Moscow, Russia. It is an international company with four factories in Europe and sales in over 70 countries. The company began as a pointe shoe manufacturer and now produces many types of dance shoes and wear.

== History ==
Nikolay Grishko decided to start the company after hearing dancers complain about their footwear through his wife, a former ballerina.

Shortly after starting the company in the early 1990s, many of the theatre workshops in Russia were forced to close and Nikolai recruited the master craftsmen from these theatre workshops to work with him. Nikolay also recruited the only person to date to have a PhD in ballet shoe technology and mechanics.

As of 2014, the company consists of four factories in Europe, a flagship store in Moscow Russia and over 500 employees, including 76 people with registered disabilities.

As of September 11, 2019, Grishko operates in the United States of America under the name Nikolay as the result of a legal battle with their US distributor, I.M. Wilson.

== Production ==
Grishko pointe shoes are handmade using all natural materials and tested by professional dancers. Grishko has developed several pointe shoe innovations such as using nano-technology to improve foot health, working with navy acoustics labs to reduce noise on stage and collaborating with a laboratory of starch products to develop better glues.

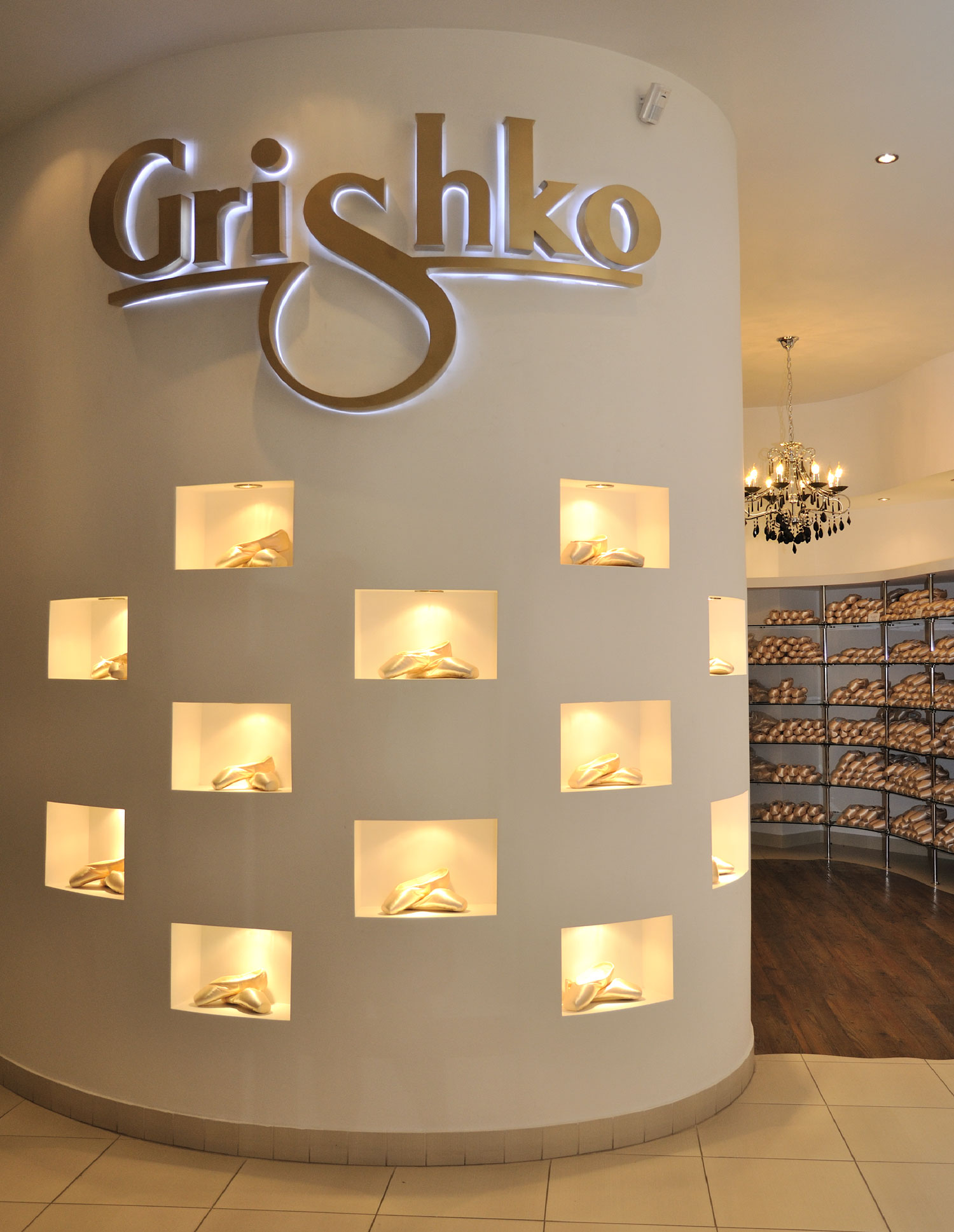
Grishko flagship store - Moscow, Russia

== Products ==
Grishko's footwear line includes shoes for pointe, ballet, ballroom, jazz, acro, contemporary, gymnastics, character and theatre. The pointe shoes are based on four main shapes, called "lasts" - the Grishko 2007, the Fouette, the Vaganova and the Elite. Grishko currently offers 26 different models of pointe shoes. The most recent pointe shoe added to the line is based on the Grishko 2007 last and is called the DreamPointe.

The dancewear line includes leotards for ballet and gymnastics, warm-up boots, tights, stage costumes, knitwear, fitness, yoga, pilates and general active lifestyle wear. The Grishko dancewear workshop handcrafts intricate tutus, costumes and shoes. The company also produces dance accessories, such as toe pads, bags, ribbons, elastics and overlays.

In 2014, Grishko created and produced its first 'haute couture' dancewear line in collaboration with Diana Vishneva and Tatyana Parfionova.

== Notable appearances ==
In the December 2014 issue of Vogue, Annie Leibovitz photographed Amy Adams wearing Grishko's Nova 2007 model pointe shoes.

Grishko products are commonly used in Vogue Russia, most notably in photoshoots by Patrick Demarchelier.

In January 2014, Ralph Lauren used Grishko pointe shoes for ballet themed window displays of its stores.

== Social causes ==
Grishko supports dance schools and organizations such as The Vaganova Academy of Russian Ballet, The Dance Open and The Boris Eifman Academy.
