= Peter Wishart (composer) =

English composer

Peter Charles Arthur Wishart (25 June 1921 – 14 August 1984) was an English composer and academic. His compositions include several neo-classical operas, orchestral and chamber pieces, and a large amount of church music. Critics have commented on Wishart's strong and individual lyricism and his admiration for the music of Igor Stravinsky.

== Career ==
Wishart was born in Crowborough and educated at Bryanston School. After serving in the army during the war he studied with Victor Hely-Hutchinson in Birmingham and (in 1947–8) with Nadia Boulanger in Paris. He then taught at Birmingham University (1950–1959, where he wrote his monograph Harmony: a Study of the Practice of the Great Masters in 1956), Guildhall School of Music, King's College London (from where he published the book Key to Music in 1971), and Reading University where he was Professor of Music from 1977 until his death.

== Music ==
Wishart is best known as a vocal composer, writing many songs, choral works (such as the English motet Jesu, dulcis memoria) and five operas, of which The Captive, a tragedy in one act, is particularly notable. It was broadcast in 1985. His comic chamber opera, The Lady of the Inn, was produced at Reading in 1984. The carol setting Alleluya, a new work is come on hand is by far his most popular work.

However, he also wrote a considerable number of orchestral and chamber pieces, including the Concerto for Orchestra (written during the Hungarian uprising), three symphonies and three quartets. The four movement Symphony No 1 in 1952, scored for double woodwind, horns and strings, was premiered in a BBC broadcast on 16 November 1953. His 1947 Serenata Concertante for clarinet and small orchestra has recently been recorded. Mark Tanner has recorded the complete piano works and there are also recordings of the Clarinet Trio and Aubade, of the String Quartet No 3 performed by the English Quartet, and of the songs sung by Jeremy Huw Williams. His music is published by various publishing houses, including Banks Music Ltd., Stainer & Bell, Hinrichsen, OUP and Jackdaws Publications.

According to his pupil Richard Carder Wishart's music was influenced by (neo-classical) Stravinsky, Paul Hindemith (especially Ludus Tonalis) and Malcolm Arnold. Another of his pupils was Geoffrey Burgon.

== Personal life ==
He was married three times and had two sons and a daughter. His second wife was Molly Holliday, a secretary in the music department of Birmingham University. On 26 May 1966 he married his third wife, the mezzo-soprano singer Maureen Lehane, with whom he worked at Reading University. They lived at Great Elm, near Frome, in Somerset and worked together until his death in 1984. Together they edited three volumes of Purcell song realisations, and she recorded a CD of his songs with pianist Alexander Kelly (British Music Society BMS 409). After his death Maureen began a music festival in his memory, the Great Elm Music Festival, and later the Jackdaws Music Education Trust. She died on 27 December 2010.

His son by his first marriage was the composer James Wishart (1957–2018), also a pianist and lecturer at the University of Liverpool. The family is unrelated to that of the composer Trevor Wishart.

== List of works ==
=== Orchestral ===
- Violin Concerto No 1, op.14 (1951)
- Symphony No 1, op. 19 (1952)
- Ecossaises for orchestra, op. 20 (1953)
- Concerto piccolo, op, 25 (1955)
- Concerto for Orchestra, op.27 (1957)
- Piano Concerto (small orchestra), op. 32 (1958)
- Variations for Orchestra, op.48 (1965)
- Serenade for small orchestra, op. 51 (1966)
- Violin Concerto No 2, op.61 (1968)
- Symphony No 2, op. 71 (1973)
- Then out of the Sweet Warm Weather, A Choral Symphony (1978)

=== Opera ===
- Two in the Bush (Birmingham, 1959)
- The Captive (Birmingham, 1960)
- The Clandestine Marriage (Cambridge, 1971)
- Clytemnestra (London, 1974), written for his wife Maureen Lehane.
- The Lady of the Inn (Reading, 1983)

=== Chamber and Instrumental ===
- Sonata for piano duet in Bb, op.5 (1949)
- Partita in F sharp for piano, op.10 (1950)
- String Quartet No 2 in F, op. 12 (1951)
- Sonatine for violin and cello, op.18 (1953)
- String Quartet No 3, op. 22 (1954)
- Aubade (Quintet for flute, two violins, oboe and cello), op.23 (1955)
- Cantilene for four cellos, op. 28 (1957)
- Opheis Kai Klimakes (Snakes and Ladders), op.35 for piano (1959)
- Pastorale and Fughetta for organ (1961)
- Organ Sonata, op. 52 (1966)
- Clarinet Trio

=== Songs ===
- A Lover's Lullaby – words by George Gascoine
- Complaint of a Hen-Pecked Husband – words Anonymous
- Feste's Song – words by Shakespeare
- Merry Go Round – words by Robert McAuley
- Mountebank's Song – words Anonymous
- Serenade – words by Thomas Campion
- The Jackdaw – arguably Wishart's most well known song, dedicated to his wife Maureen Lehane with words by William Cowper and completed on 27 January 1965, Hampstead.
- Spider – Words by Lord de Taberly
- Cat Goddesses – words by Robert Graves
- Henry & Mary – words by Robert Graves
- Quatre Petits Negres Blancs – words Anonymous
- Spring Sadness – words Anonymous, translated by Helen Waddell
- The Bedpost – words by Robert Graves
- The Magpie – words by James McAuley
- The Pessimist – words by Benjamin King
- Tune for Swans – words by James McAuley
- You are a Refuge – St Augustine

Published by Banks Music Publications

- Bird of Paradise – words by Robert Graves, Medium Voice (BSS2018)
- Fidele – words by Shakespeare
- Two Shakespeare Songs for medium voice (BSS2011)

Published by Hinrichsen

- June Twilight – words by John Masefield, Medium voice (H-999)
- Mistress Mine – words by Shakespeare, Baritone (H-567)
- Spring Sadness – words by Helen Waddell, Medium voice (H-998)

== Sources ==
- Opera at Stanford University
- https://web.archive.org/web/20110929205558/http://www.wishart.org/peterwishart.html
- Wishart, Peter; 'Two Shakespeare Songs' (York: Banks Music Publications, 1989)
- Wishart, Peter; 'Spider' (Frome: Jackdaws Publications, 1999)
