= Nardus Williams =

British opera singer

Nardus Williams is a British soprano singer born in Worcester, England.

Williams trained at the International Opera School of the Royal College of Music where she was the sole recipient of the Kiri Te Kanawa Foundation Scholarship.

Williams was a member of the Houston Opera Studio for the 2018/19 season and she is a former Jerwood Young Artist at Glyndebourne Festival Opera. She was an English National Opera Harewood Artist between 2019 and 2022.

Before attaining professional operatic roles, Williams was working as a steward at Opera Holland Park. Fellow soprano Susan Bullock mentioned to the Holland Park management that she had taught Williams in a masterclass a few days earlier. By the following season, Williams had commenced on the company's Young Artists Scheme.

Williams won the Rising Talent award at the 2022 International Opera Awards and was nominated for The Times Breakthrough Award at the 2022 South Bank Sky Arts Award.
