= Uncle Vanya (disambiguation) =

Uncle Vanya is a play by Anton Chekhov.

Uncle Vanya may also refer to:

- Uncle Vanya (1957 film), directed by John Goetz and Franchot Tone
- Uncle Vanya (1963 film), directed by Stuart Burge
- Uncle Vanya (1970 film), directed by Andrei Konchalovsky
- Uncle Vanya (1990 film), directed by Antonio Salines
- Uncle Vanya (1991 film), directed by Gregory Mosher
- Uncle Vanya (2020 film), directed by Ross MacGibbon and Ian Rickson

== See also ==
- McDonald's in Russia, several locations of which were rebranded as Uncle Vanya in 2022
