= Chelenge Van Rampelberg =

Kenyan sculptor

Chelenge Van Rampelberg (born 1961) is a Kenyan sculptor who works with wood. She has been called Kenya's first female sculptor. She also has produced oil paintings.

== Early life and education ==
Van Rampeberg was raised in the rural community of Kericho in the Rift Valley. She was exposed to wood and cutting wood from an early age, due to the necessity of gathering firewood from the forests near her home.

She did not receive a formal arts education until the early 1990s, when she attended a two-week workshop at Alliance Francaise about etching and woodcut printing. She has since also taken courses from Alliance Francaise, Gallery Watatu, and the Ngecha Artist Association.

== Career ==
After her three children started school, Van Rampelberg found herself with free time, which she decided to dedicate to art. She took up painting, but hid her pieces. Her husband, after seeing her paintings, encouraged her to try and have them exhibited. Van Rampelberg's first exhibition was in 1985. Her oil paintings are primarily narrative, drawing on stories and images from her childhood.

Van Rampelberg first began carving wood after an avocado tree fell outside her house and she decided to try sculpting the wood as a way to relieve stress. Her first sculpture, My Mum and I, is held by the Nairobi Contemporary Arts Institute as of 2024. She continued experimenting, and had carved three pieces she enjoyed within three months. Her sculptures are semi-abstract, and "[centre] heavily around women, their place in society, black beauty and gender inequality" as well as exploring religious themes.

In 1996, Van Rampelberg carved Adam and Eve, a piece consisting of two figures made out of ebony wood.

In 2013, Van Rampelberg was one of six artists included in an exhibition at the Nairobi National Museum celebrating 50 years of Kenyan independence, and she also had a solo exhibition in the One Off gallery at Rosslyn, near Nairobi. Several of her sculptures were bought that year by the Sankara Hotel at Westlands.

In 2014, Van Rampelberg was the artist in residence at the Lamu Painters Festival.

In 2020, Van Rampelberg was included as part of a German exhibition centering on work by Michael Armitage, who was a childhood friend of one of her children. The exhibition was also shown in London at the Royal Academy of Arts in 2021. In 2022, the exhibition moved to Nairobi under the name "Mwili, Akili na Roho", and was expanded with works by three additional artists.

In 2023, two of Van Rampelberg's sculptures were included in an exhibition by Alliance Francaise focusing on Kenyan women artists. In 2024, a retrospective of Van Rampelberg's work was held at the Nairobi Contemporary Arts Institute.

== Personal life ==
After finishing high school, Chelenge married French artist and furniture designer Marc Van Rampelberg in the early 1980s. The couple had three children.

Van Rampelberg's studio is in Tuala, Ongata Rongai, close to the southern part of Nairobi National Park.
