= Pointe shoe =

Ballet shoe with stiffened toe

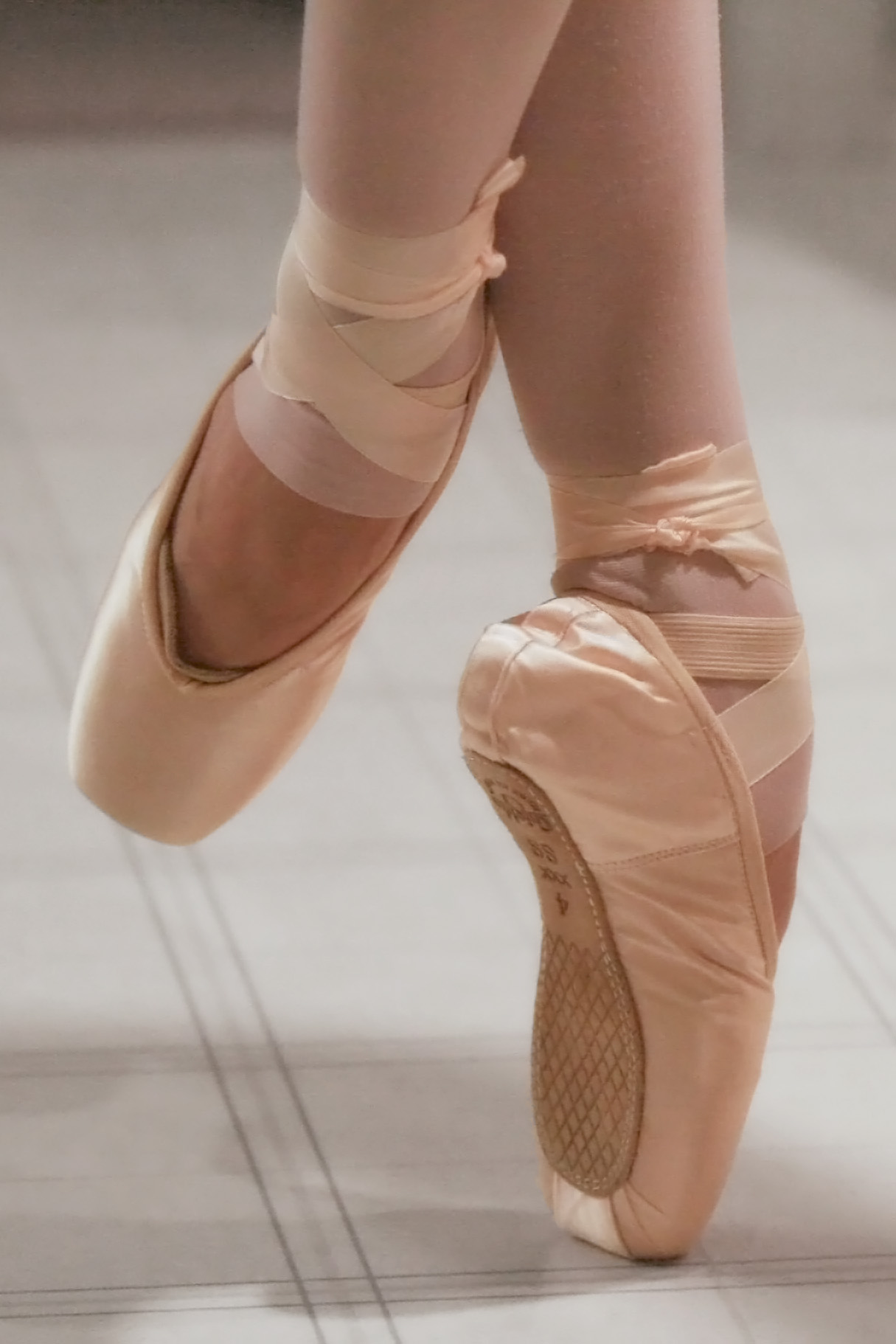
Modern pointe shoes. The edge of the toe pad, which is inserted between the foot and toe box for cushioning, can be seen on the dancer's right foot.

A pointe shoe (UK: /pwæ̃t/, US: /pwɑːnt, pɔːɪnt/), also referred to as a ballet shoe, is a type of shoe worn by ballet dancers when performing pointe work. Pointe shoes were conceived in response to the desire for dancers to appear weightless and sylph-like and have evolved to enable dancers to dance en pointe (on the tips of their toes) for extended periods of time.

== History ==
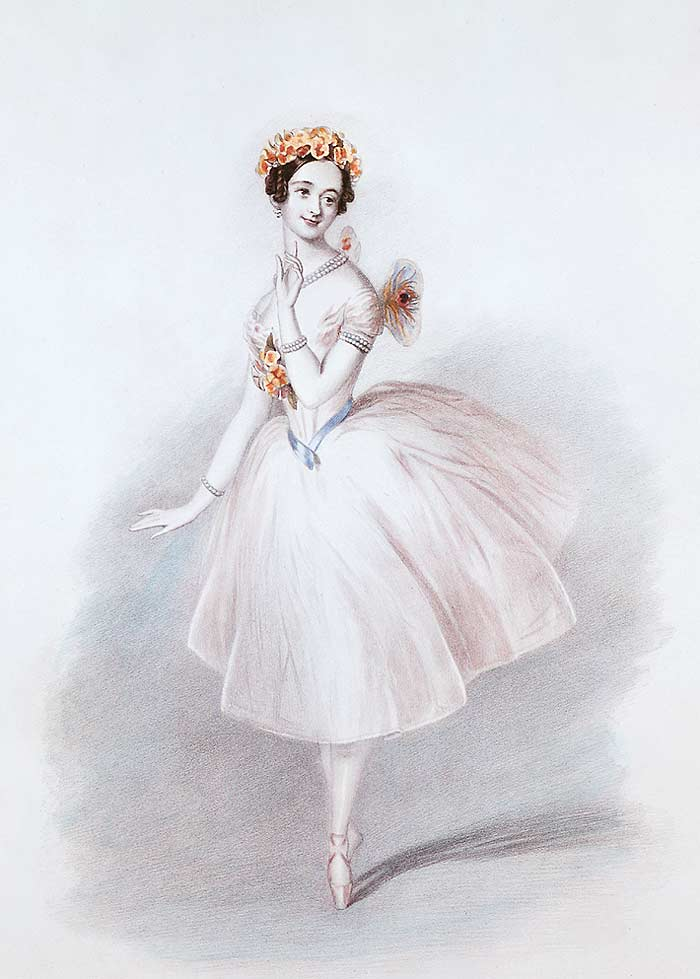
Marie Taglioni in the title role of La Sylphide, a ballet danced entirely en pointe

Women began to dance ballet in 1681, twenty years after King Louis XIV of France ordered the founding of the Académie Royale de Danse. At that time, the standard women's ballet shoe had heels. In the 1730s, dancer Marie Camargo of the Paris Opéra Ballet was the first to wear a non-heeled shoe, enabling her to perform leaps that would have been difficult, if not impossible, in the more conventional shoes of the age. After the French Revolution, heels were completely eliminated from standard ballet shoes. These flat-bottomed predecessors of the modern pointe shoe were secured to the feet by ribbons and incorporated pleats under the toes to enable dancers to leap, execute turns, and fully extend their feet.

The first dancers to rise up on their toes did so with the help of an invention by Charles Didelot in 1796. His "flying machine" lifted dancers upward, allowing them to stand on their toes before leaving the ground. This lightness and ethereal quality was well received by audiences and, as a result, choreographers began to look for ways to incorporate more pointe work into their pieces.

As dance progressed into the 19th century, the emphasis on technical skill increased, as did the desire to dance en pointe without the aid of wires. When Marie Taglioni first danced La Sylphide en pointe, her shoes were nothing more than modified satin slippers; the soles were made of leather and the sides and toes were darned to help the shoes hold their shapes. Because the shoes of this period offered no support, dancers would pad their toes for comfort and rely on the strength of their feet and ankles for support.

The next substantially different form of pointe shoe appeared in Italy in the late 19th century. Dancers like Pierina Legnani wore shoes with a sturdy, flat platform at the front end of the shoe, rather than the more sharply pointed toe of earlier models. These shoes also included a box—made of layers of fabric—for containing the toes, and a stiffer, stronger sole. They were constructed without nails and the soles were only stiffened at the toes, making them nearly silent. Salvatore Capezio had also improved the construction of pointe shoes after the opening of his shoe manufacturing company in 1887. After completing a series of repairs, Capezio established the “Duro-toe” pointe shoe that had suede over the toe rather than satin, increasing the shoes durability.

The birth of the modern pointe shoe is often attributed to the early 20th-century Russian ballerina Anna Pavlova, who was one of the most famous and influential dancers of her time. Pavlova had particularly high, arched insteps, which left her vulnerable to injury when dancing en pointe. She also had slender, tapered feet, which resulted in excessive pressure on her big toes. To compensate for this, she inserted toughened leather soles into her shoes for extra support and flattened and hardened the toe area to form a box.

Men have not historically performed in pointe shoes except for comedic effect. Examples of this include Les Ballets Trockadero de Monte Carlo, and characters such as Bottom in A Midsummer Night's Dream and the evil stepsisters in Cinderella. As ballet culture evolves, male dancers en pointe are becoming more common. Some male or male-presenting dancers may choose to study pointe work in order to better understand the mechanics involved in partnering work, in which the female role is usually performed en pointe. Some teachers and dancers believe that pointe technique is a beneficial supplement to traditional male ballet steps, as the increased foot strength and articulation may improve jump height and technique. Non-comedic male performances en pointe are also becoming more common, although they are still rare in large classical companies. For example, Ballet22 is a recently founded company with the stated aim of showcasing men and male presenting dancers en pointe outside of a comedic or drag setting.

== Controversy ==
Pointe shoes supposedly employ structural reinforcements in both shank and toe box in an attempt to distribute the dancer's weight load throughout the feet, thus reducing the load on the toes enough to enable the dancer to support all their body weight on fully vertical feet.

But this claim is disputed. Nothing in pointe shoe design prevents a foot’s "slippage", in which, when en pointe, the dancer’s weight forces their foot down into the shoe until their big toe meets the end of the toe box. Measurements have shown that most of the dancer's weight en pointe is borne by the big toe(s) regardless of the length of the second toe. Hence, such reinforcements cannot and do not distribute the weight load throughout the foot as claimed. However, the pointe shoe does have some effect in distributing pressure; approximately 80% of the total force is applied to the ends of the toes with most of the remaining 20% absorbed by shear forces on the skin. Most dancers proficient in pointe technique are not capable of supporting their own weight in the pointe position without specialised shoes.

== Construction ==
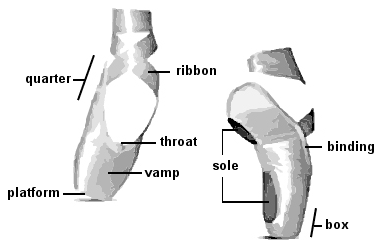
Parts of a pointe shoe

Every dancer has unique feet, with variations that include toe length and shape, midfoot and ankle flexibility, and mechanical strength. Consequently, most pointe shoe manufacturers produce more than one model of shoe, with each model offering a different fit, as well as custom fitted shoes. Regardless of the manufacturer or model, however, all pointe shoes share two important structural features that enable dancers to dance on the tips of their toes:

- A box within the front end of the shoe that encases and supports the dancer's toes.
- A shank, which is a piece of rigid material that serves to stiffen the sole so as to provide support for the arch of the en pointe foot.

The exterior of a pointe shoe is covered with fabric, thus concealing the box and other internal structural elements and lending an aesthetically pleasing look to the shoe. Most pointe shoes are covered with satin, but some are available with canvas exteriors.

The vamp refers to the shoe's upper piece, measured from the platform to the drawstring; normally, longer toes call for a longer vamp. The throat is the edge of the vamp above the arch of the foot; it is usually either v-shaped or round, which tend to suit feet with higher or lower arches, respectively. The drawstring is located within the binding on the throat; this may be made from either elastic or lace and usually ends at the bottom of the throat.

=== Box and wings ===
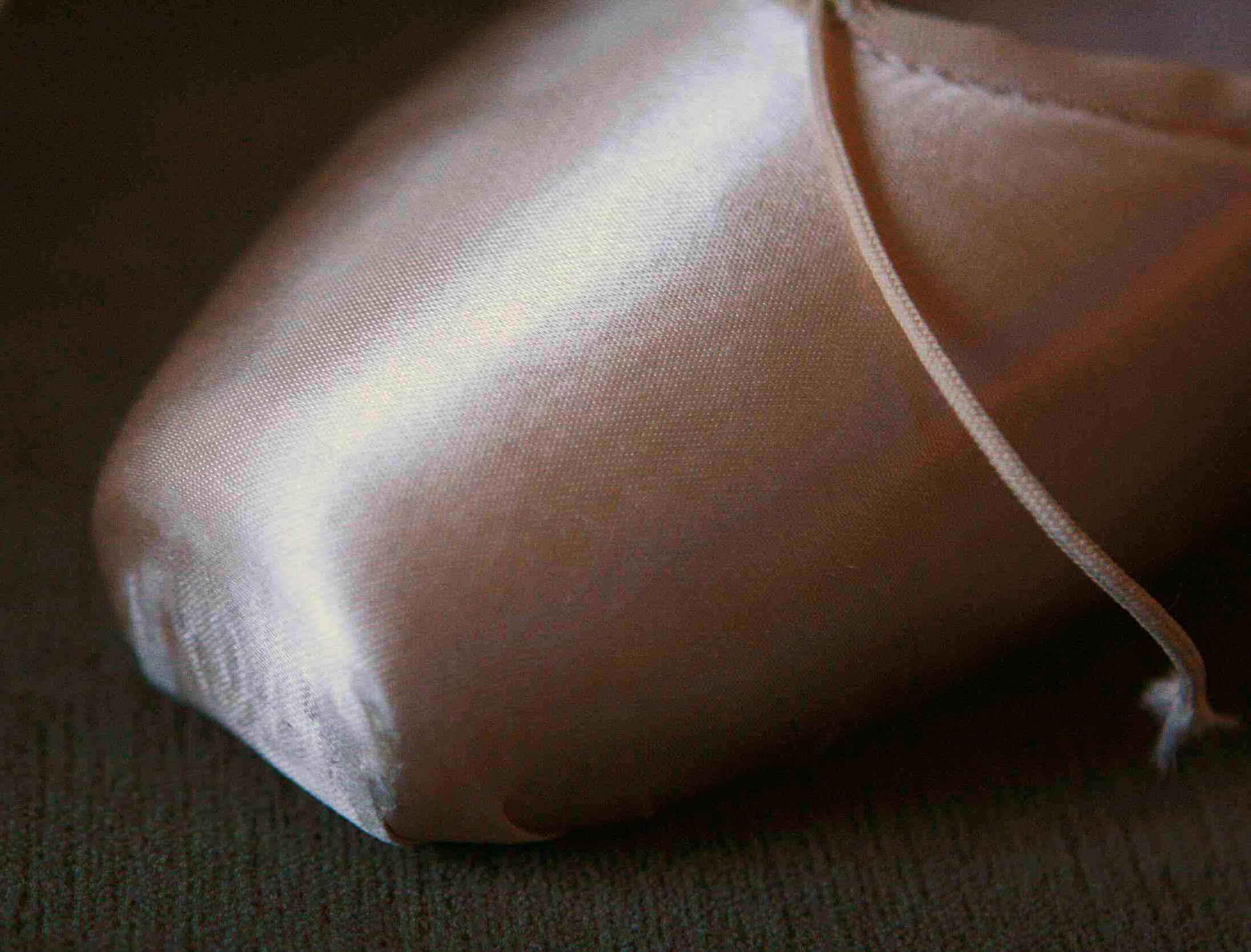
A pointe shoe's tightly stretched satin exterior exposes the shape of its underlying toe box.

The box is a rigid enclosure within the front end of the shoe that encases and supports the dancer's toes. The front end of the box is flattened so as to form a platform upon which the dancer can balance, and fabric covers the exterior of the box for aesthetics. Some manufacturers insert a suede patch over the platform to provide a longer lasting surface over the high-wear part of the shoe. There are pros and cons to this approach, and whether a suede tip is preferred is usually down to the dancer's own preference in how they prepare their shoes. The wings of the shoe refer to the sides of the box, which typically extend up slightly past the throat of the shoe and offer lateral support.

In conventional pointe shoes, the box is typically made from tightly packed layers of paper, paste and fabric that have been glued together and then shaped into an enclosure. When the glue dries, it becomes hard and provides the required stiffness. In some newer pointe shoes, the box may be made from plastic and rubber, with rigidity provided by the plastic.

Box shapes vary widely among shoe models and manufacturers. A number of shape attributes, including box length, height (sometimes called the profile), taper angle and platform area, determine the suitability of a shoe for any particular foot.

=== Sole ===
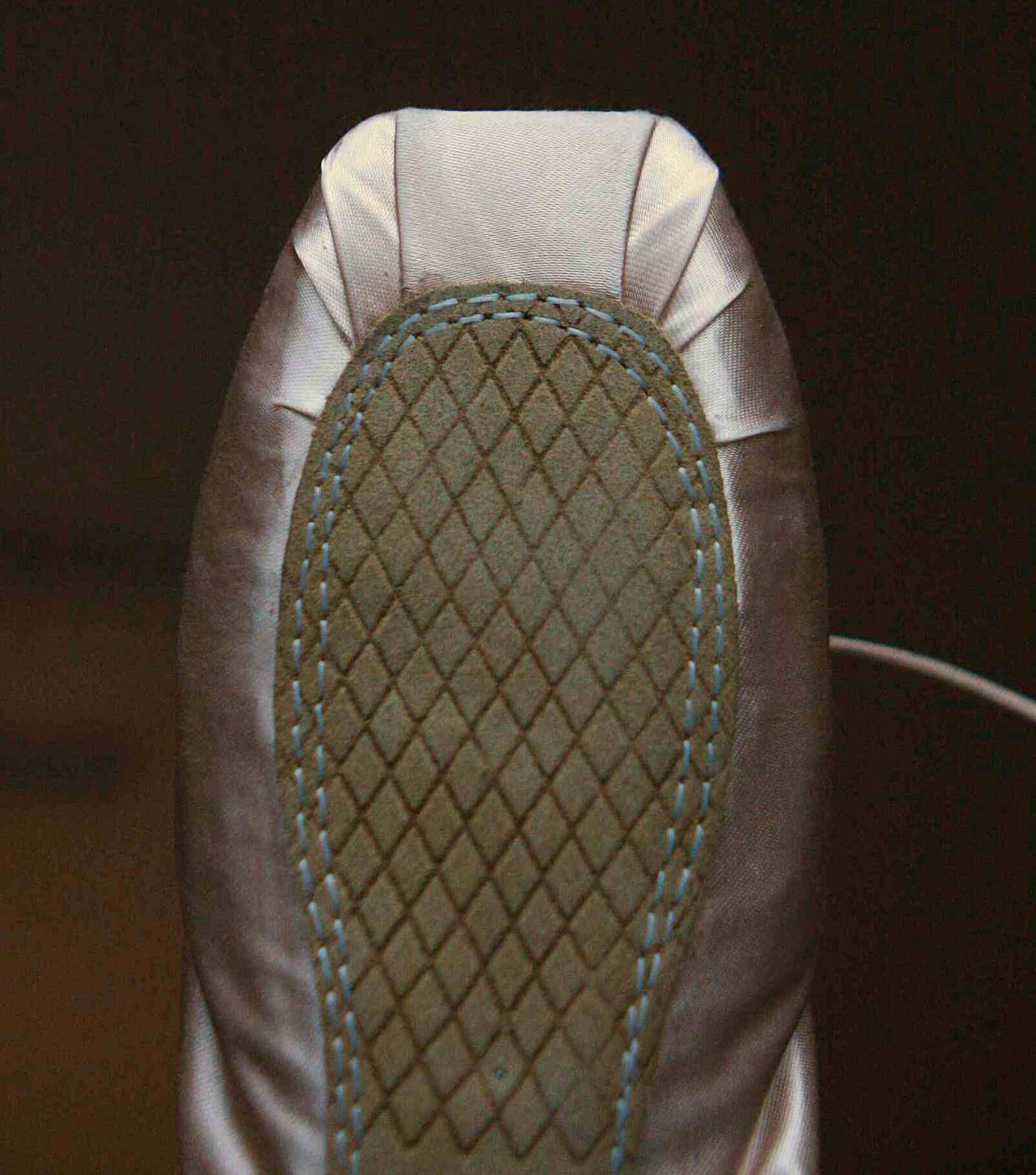
The sole is thin and covers only part of the bottom of the pointe shoe so as to remain inconspicuous.

For most pointe shoes, the sole is constructed from a piece of leather that is attached to the shoe with adhesive and reinforced by stitching along its edges. The sole overlaps and secures the unfinished edges of the shoe's exterior fabric. Pointe shoes may be manufactured with either scraped soles, which provide superior traction, or buffed soles, which have a smoother surface for reduced traction.

Aesthetic appearance is of paramount importance for modern pointe shoes. To achieve an elegant appearance, the shoe's more decorative outer fabric is prominently featured, covering the maximum possible area of the shoe's visible surfaces. To this end, the sole is made of thin material to give it a minimal profile, and a margin of satin is artfully pleated around it so that the sole covers only part of the bottom of the shoe. Some manufacturers offer pleatless designs, which may give a cleaner appearance and a flatter area to balance on between the end of the sole and the platform. However, such differences are usually not visible from the audience in a traditional theatre performance setting.

=== Shank ===
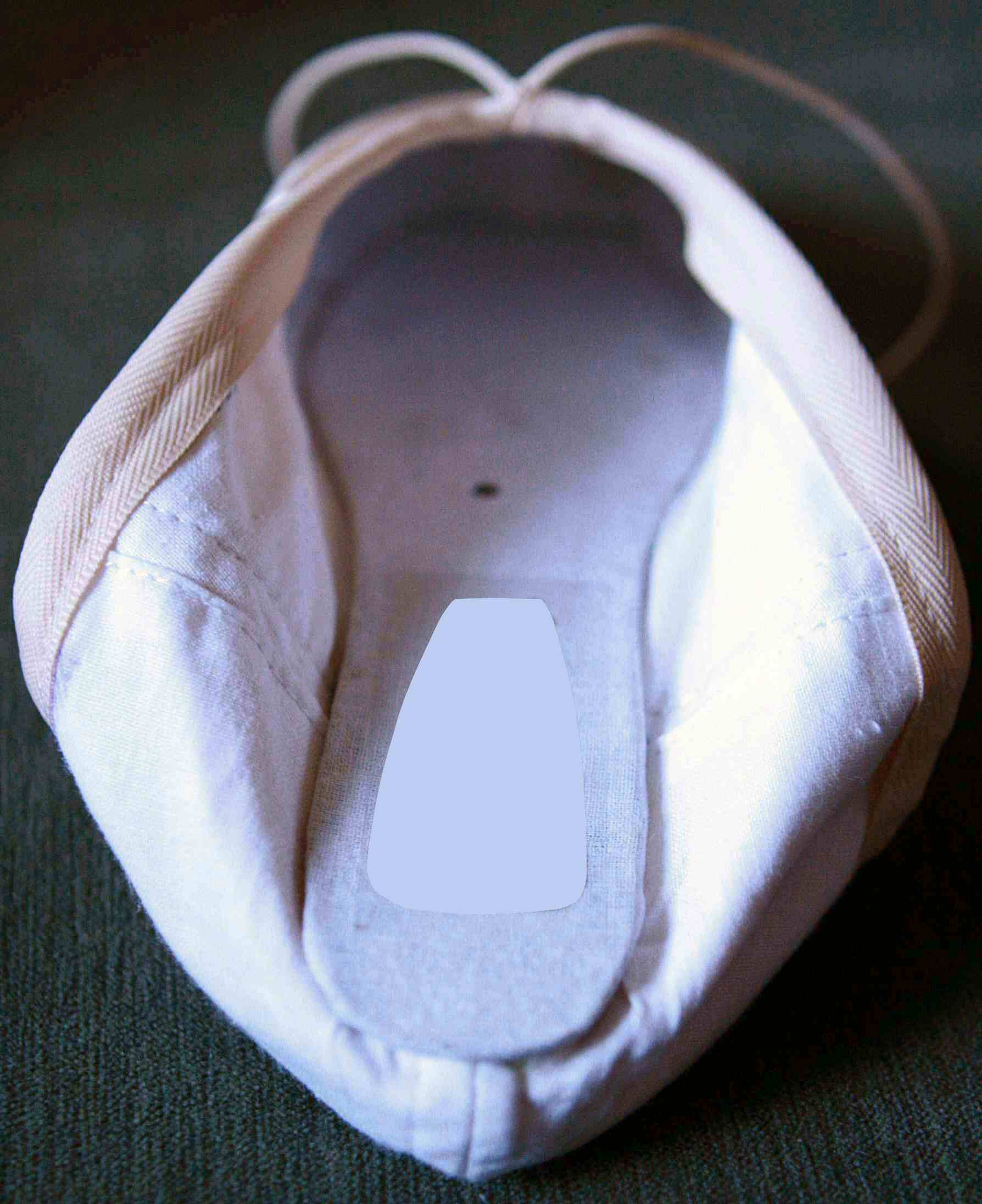
The shank is covered by thin fabric, which in turn directly contacts the bottom of the dancer's foot.

Shanks are typically made from leather, plastic, cardstock, or layers of glue-hardened burlap. The flexibility of a shank is determined by its thickness and the type of material used, and how it is attached to the rest of the shoe. A shank's thickness may be consistent throughout or it may vary along its length to produce different strengths at select points. For example, slits may be cut across a shank at demi-pointe to enhance roll through. Also, a shank's thickness may transition at some point along its length in order to implement differing strengths above and below the transition. Standard pointe shoes typically have a full shank, in which the shank runs the full length of the sole, or fractional (e.g., half or three-quarter) length shanks, which may be entirely absent further back in the shoe or have a decreased stiffness. Many pointe shoe manufacturers offer a choice of shank materials, and some will build shoes with customized shanks of varying stiffness and length.

Different pointe shoe makers offer different strengths of shank. For example, Grishko, a Russian pointe shoe company, offers various shank strengths such as super soft, soft, medium, hard, and super hard. Shank strength is not standardised across brands or even models, so a 'soft' shank in one shoe may be closely equivalent to a 'hard' in another style. The strength of the shank mostly depends on the arch and strength of the dancer’s foot, but is a nuanced issue which depends also on the use of the shoe and the specific points of flexibility and strength of the dancer. If the dancer has a strong and flexible arch, they may need a hard or super hard shank to support the foot while en pointe properly, or they may prefer a softer shoe which allows greater control if they are strong enough to control their own flexibility. If the dancer is starting pointe and has weaker feet, a super soft or soft shank may be more suitable, allowing the dancer to point their foot more easily. However, if the dancer is very flexible a harder shoe may help them to control their movements better and reduce risk of overstretching.

Additionally, dancers will sometimes wear different pointe shoe models for different performance pieces or activities. In such cases, the choreography can dictate the type of shank required; a lyrical style may call for a softer shoe, while a dynamic style with many turns or slow, partner supported section is more easily performed in a hard, stiff shoe. Some professional dancers or pre-professional students may wear two or more styles of shoe, with one being harder and longer lasting for use in class or rehearsal and another being softer and more aesthetically pleasing for use in performance or auditions. Care must be taken to choose shoes which are not too dissimilar, as every changed aspect of the shoe will change the dancer's movement and perception and introduce a 'learning curve' when swapping between models.

=== Ribbons and elastic band ===
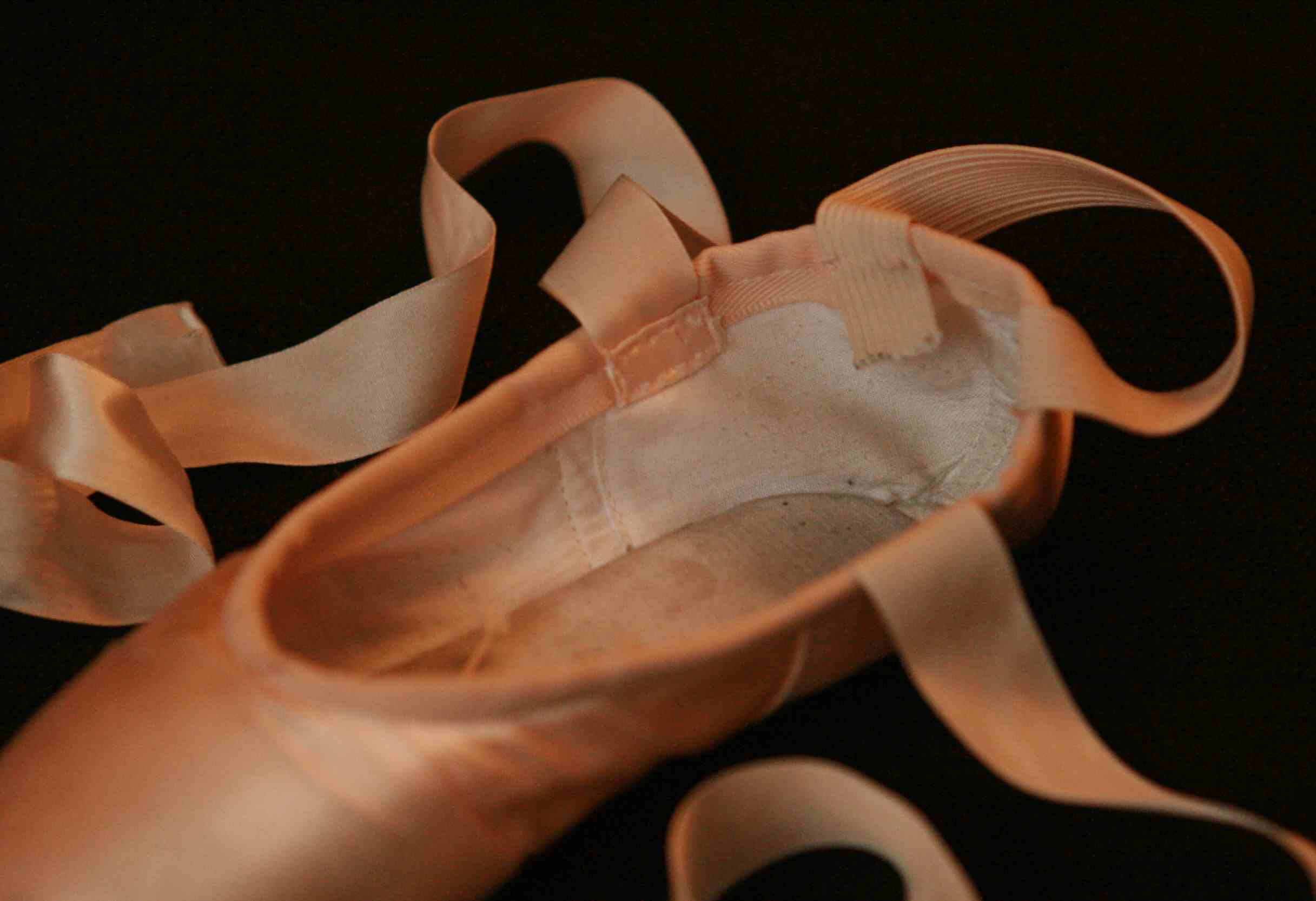
Ribbons and elastic band used to secure a pointe shoe to the foot

A pointe shoe traditionally employs fabric ribbons and elastic bands to secure it to the foot. Most of the work of securing shoes to feet is done by the ribbons. The two ribbons wrap around the dancer's ankle in opposite directions, overlapping one another so as to form a cross at the front. The ends are then tied together in a knot, which is then tucked under the ribbon on the inside of the ankle to hide it from view. Ribbons are traditionally made of satin, but manufacturers have begun offering elastic ribbons which may decrease strain around the ankle at the cost of decreased support. Satin ribbons are also available with elastic inserts meant to sit over the Achilles tendon, for the alleviation of Achilles tendinitis.

Elastic may be used to combat specific issues with the attachment of the shoe to the foot. For example, a single elastic band over the arch may assist in pulling the shank and sole close to the foot. Crossed elastics running from the heel to the sides of the shoe may prevent heel slipping, a common issue in pointe shoes. Alternatively, a small elastic loop is sometimes sewn at the back of the heel and the ribbons threaded through before tying in order to pull the back of the shoe up.

The locations where the band and ribbons attach to a shoe is critical, as incorrect placement can result in a poorly fitting shoe. Some dancers choose to sew the ribbons and elastics onto the inside of the shoe, whereas others sew them outside onto the silk exterior. Typically, the loose ends of newly sewn ribbons are briefly exposed to open flames to melt them and thus prevent fraying.

Although ribbons are traditional and required by most classical companies, pointe shoes may be attached in whatever way is functional and convenient for the dancer. If the dancer has to quickly change shoes in a performance or between classes, they may choose to only add elastics to allow them to slip the shoes on and off quickly.

=== Pré-pointe shoe ===
A pré-pointe shoe, which is also variously called a break-down, "demi-pointe" or a soft-block shoe, shares many characteristics with pointe shoes. For example, its outer appearance resembles that of a pointe shoe and it has a toe box, although the box is softer and the wings (sides of the toe box) are typically not as deep as those found on pointe shoes. Pré-pointe shoes are secured to the feet with ribbons and elastic in an identical fashion to pointe shoes. Unlike pointe shoes, however, demi-pointe shoes have no shank and, as a result, they do not provide the support necessary for proper pointe work.

Pré-pointe shoes are most often used to train dancers who are new to pointe technique. They serve to acclimate dancers to the feel of wearing pointe shoes and to strengthen the ankles and feet in preparation for dancing en pointe in pointe shoes. The toe box allows the dancer to experience the feel of a pointe shoe, while the insole and outsole work together to provide the resistance needed for developing foot and ankle strength.

== Manufacturing process ==
Traditional pointe shoes are usually manufactured using a method known as turnshoe, in which each shoe is initially assembled inside-out on a last and then turned right-side-out before finishing. When manufacturing standard pointe shoes, a standardized, common last is used for both left and right shoes, resulting in identical left and right shoes in a pair. Some ballerinas have custom-made lasts that replicate the shapes of their own feet; these may be supplied to a pointe shoe manufacturer for the purpose of manufacturing custom shoes.

== Breaking in and customisation ==
Dancers typically "break in" new pointe shoes to reduce or eliminate the discomfort they commonly cause, or to prepare them for a specific task such as an audition or performance. Often this is done by performing relevés that flex the box and shank in a natural manner, thus causing the box shape and shank flex points to adapt to the dancer's feet. Various other methods have been employed for breaking in pointe shoes, including deforming them with hands or against hard surfaces, striking them on hard surfaces, and moistening or heating specific areas to soften the glues, but some believe these methods typically are ineffective as they do not cause the shoes to conform to the feet and also may damage the shoes or shorten their usable lifetimes. Nonetheless, manual breaking in is often employed especially by professional dancers who need their shoes performance ready very quickly. Many professionals receive a shoe stipend from their company, and therefore are less concerned with longevity of the shoe than students and recreational dancers who must cover their own equipment costs. Instead, professionals may employ more aggressive manual breaking in methods as they do not have enough time in class to break enough shoes in with their feet to a performance standard.

Beginners to pointe generally should not go out of their way to break in their shoes, and instead allow them to deform naturally over the course of their training. There may be technique and strength benefits to allowing the feet to 'do the work' of breaking down the shoe, but the most commonly cited reason for this is that beginners are not yet aware of how they want their shoes to break in order to perform at their best.

Other customisations are available to dancers which do not directly break down the shoe. Most customisations serve either to correct a minor fit issue, or to improve the lifetime of the shoe by selectively slowing the breaking in process. Dancers may use cyanoacrylate glue or shellac to stiffen the box or shank, increase support, and decelerate the softening process. A non-ideal vamp length may be corrected by adding a length of thick, stiff elastic low in the throat of the shoe to mimic a higher vamp, or by cutting a slit into the throat of the shoe to reduce the support offered.

Occasionally, targeted breaking in of the shoe can circumvent a minor fit issue, for example aggressive bending or cutting of the shank higher up in the shoe to discourage it from bending too low to be supportive (this may be referred to as 'three quartering' or 'halving' the shank, depending on the location). A shoe which is slightly too narrow and high profile in the box may be improved by squashing the box (often by standing on it while wearing the shoe) to flatten it out and create extra width.

Most intermediate to advanced dancers will have their own unique combination of customisations and breaking in process. For example, a dancer who tends to break the box before the shank may selectively apply shellac to the wings and platform before bending their shoe at the three quarter in order to bring the performance of the box and shank more into line with each other.

== Accessories ==
A dancer may experience discomfort while wearing a pointe shoe even after the shoe has been broken in. Several devices are commonly used to mitigate the discomfort:

- Toe pads are pouches that encapsulate and cushion the toes from the unyielding box and prevent friction that can cause blistering. These are typically made from thin, fabric-covered gel sheets, or silicone.
- Gel toe spacers of various shapes and sizes are inserted between toes; these serve to adjust toe spacing and alignment so as to alleviate pain at the bunion joint. Toe spacers are often recommended to prevent bunion development in beginners as they improve the alignment of the toes through the metatarsal joint. Spacers are most commonly needed between the big and second toes, but smaller spacers are available to fit the other toes and may be used to reduce friction.
- Lambswool is a more traditional option which offers targeted padding. Dancers may form a toe pad like shape out of the wool, or selectively place wool into the shoe or tape it onto the foot to alleviate specific pressure areas.
- Tape is wrapped around toes to reduce chafing and blisters.
- Blister pads are small gel squares that prevent damage from rubbing and friction.
- Toe caps are usually made of gel or silicone and provide extra padding selectively at the end of the toe. For dancers whose first and second toes are very different lengths, padding up the shorter toe is a common method to redistribute pressure off the longer toe and into the rest of the foot.
- Other specific guards are available from many dancewear manufacturers. They may be shaped to protect a specific toe joint or common blister area, and allow dancers to quickly protect problem areas without introducing unneeded padding.

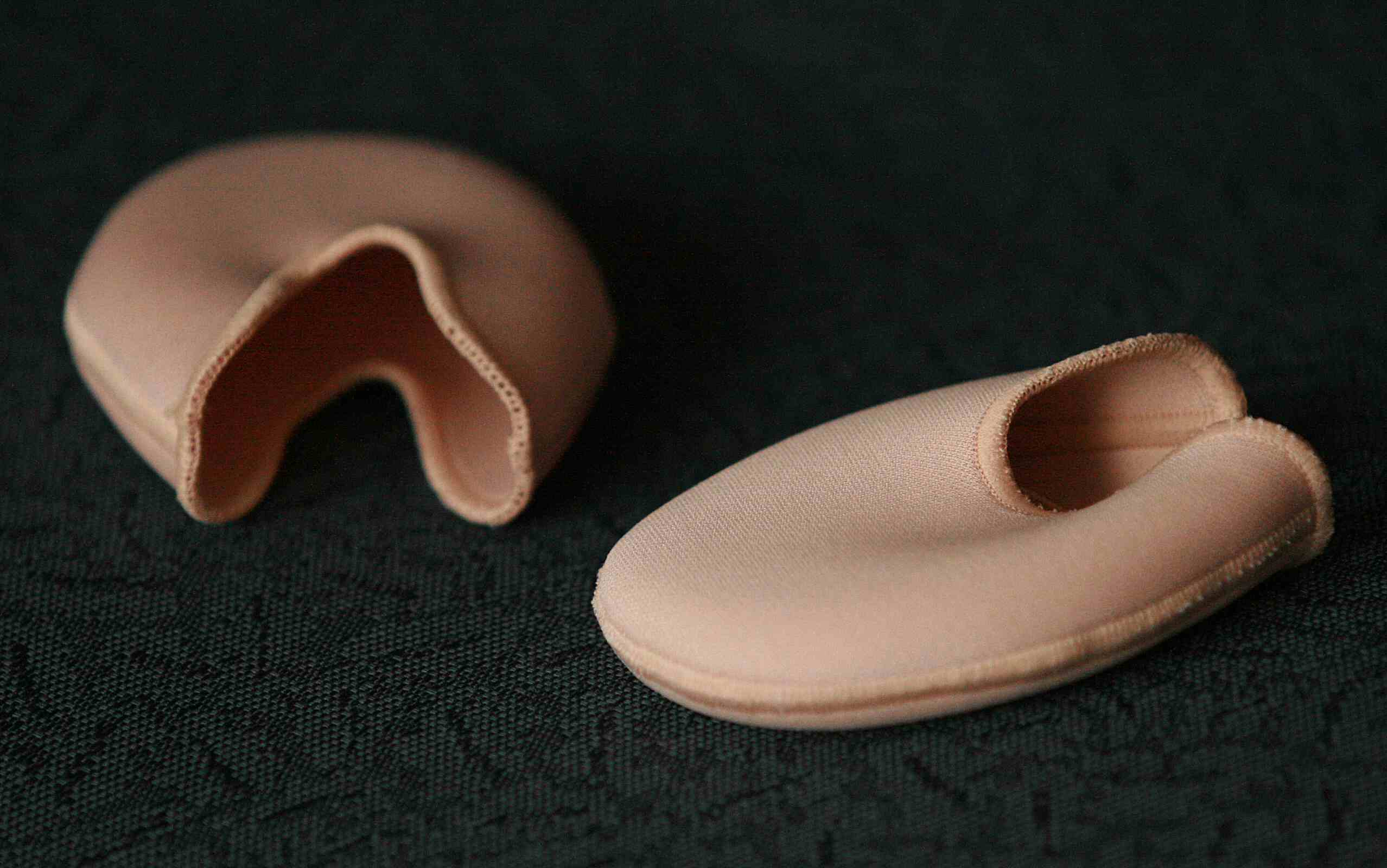
Toe pads

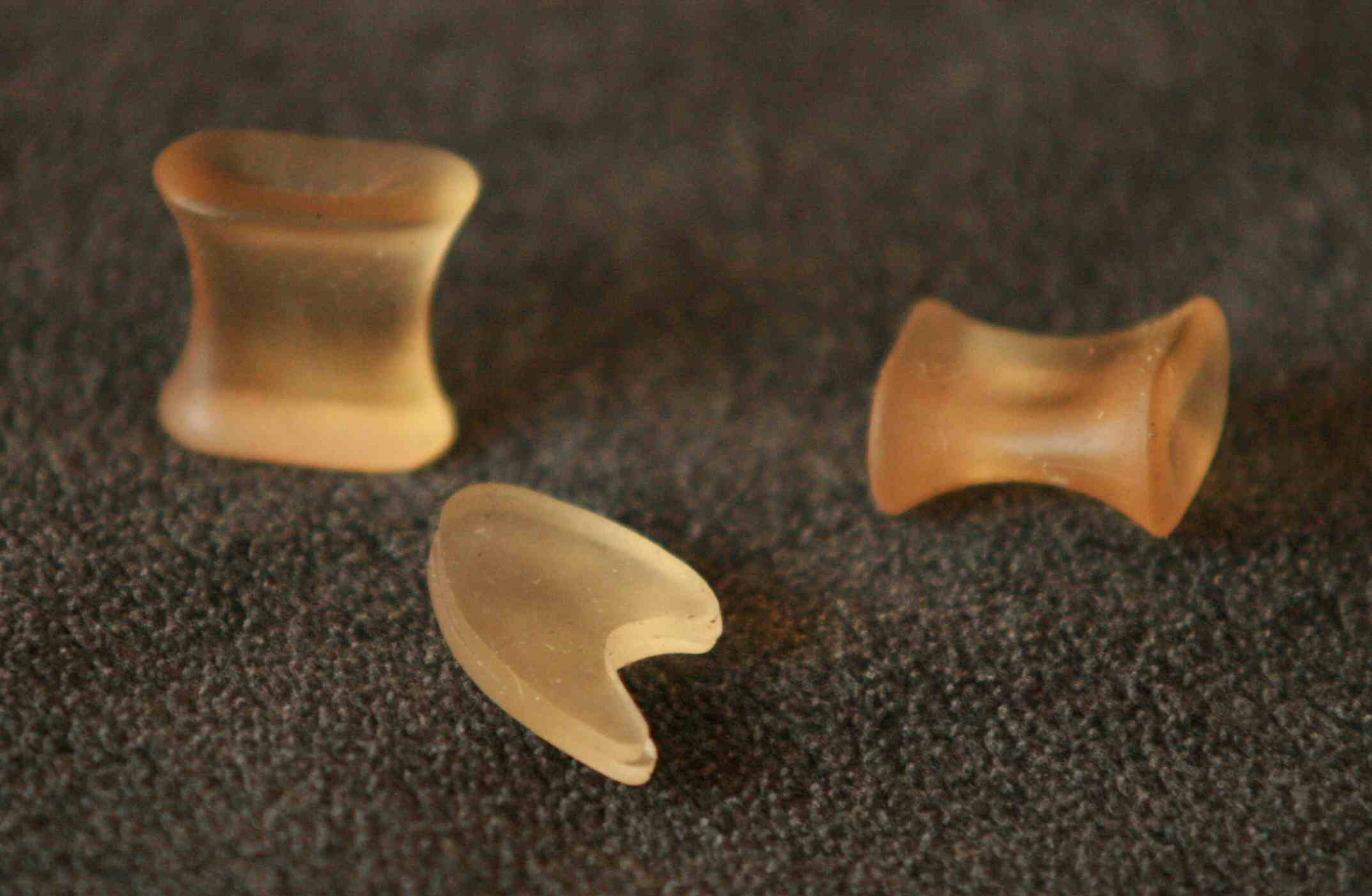
Toe spacers

The ideally fit pointe shoe should have the most minimal padding possible. In general, padding can mask fit issues which would be better remedied by a different model of shoe. A proficient shoe fitter will use padding selectively to combat specific mismatches between a dancer's foot and the best matched shoe available, for example by padding up a shorter big toe to alleviate pressure on the second toe, or the use of a toe pad to make the toes wider and taller to better fill out a box. In general, excessive padding on the tips of the toes to make a shoe bearable indicates that a shoe it not adequately redirecting force to the rest of the foot and belies a poor overall fit.

== Lifetime ==
In the course of normal use, there are three predominant types of wear on a pointe shoe that will determine its useful lifetime. Different dancers will tend to wear out different sections of the shoe first. As the body of the shoe is repetitively flexed, the shank gradually weakens and loses its ability to provide support. A pointe shoe is no longer serviceable when the shank breaks or becomes too soft to provide support. The second is the softening of the box and the platform on which the dancer balances. When a pointe shoe has been worn to the point where it is no longer safe to wear, the shoe is typically referred to as "dead".

The other primary type of wear involves the exterior fabric. In pointe work the front face and bottom edge of the toe box are subjected to friction against the performance surface. This friction will eventually wear through the shoe's outer fabric covering, thereby exposing the toe box and creating loose, frayed fabric edges. Unlike a weakened shank, damaged outer fabric does not affect the performance of a shoe. Due to its unprofessional appearance, however, damaged fabric may render the shoe unfit to wear in situations other than informal practice or rehearsal. Dancers may darn these areas to improve longevity, or fine-tune the mechanics of the shoe. Glue-on suede patches are also available to cover the high-wear areas of satin and improve the appearance of the shoe.

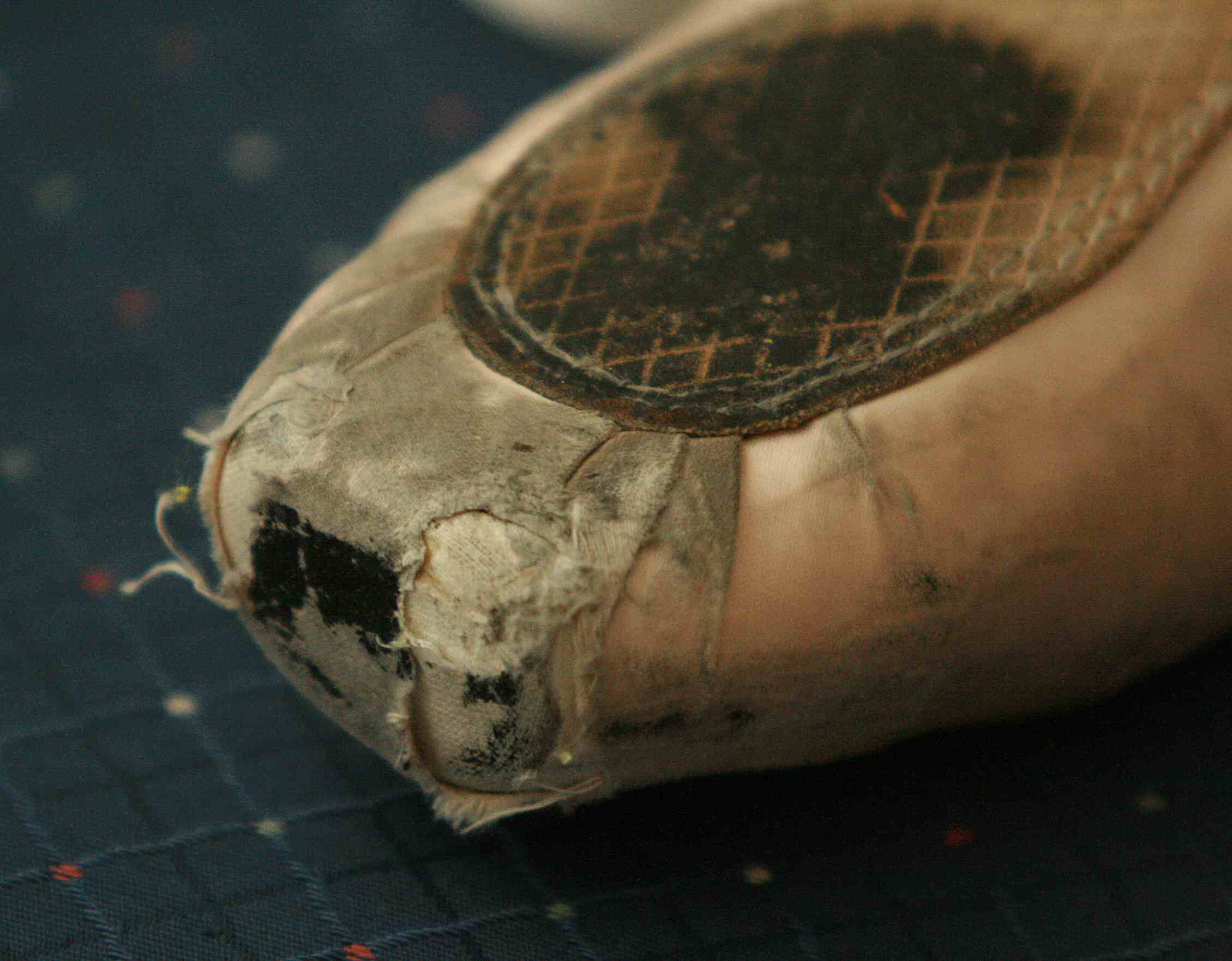
Typical pointe shoe wear, in which the fabric has worn through to expose the box

Under moderate usage, a pair of pointe shoes will typically last through ten to twenty hours of wear. For dance students, this often translates into weeks or months of serviceable use from a pair of pointe shoes. Professional dancers typically wear out pointe shoes more quickly; a new pair may wear out in a single performance. For example, in 2013 New York City Ballet ordered 8,500 pairs (for 180 dancers) and the Royal Ballet used approximately 12,000 pairs of pointe shoes. Early in their life, shoes are usually not adequately broken in for use in performance or auditions, while later in life shoes may not hold up to several hours of back to back class or rehearsal. It is a common strategy for dancers to rotate between several pairs of shoes, with shoes starting as classwork pairs before being moved to audition or performance work. Some dancers break shoes in a way which amplifies their foot and ankle mobility; 'dead' shoes which are no longer safe to dance on may be saved for use in photoshoots to show off a dancer's mobility.

The lifetime of a pointe shoe depends on many factors, including:

- Usage: More aggressive dance styles and more frequent, longer durations of use will hasten wear. In performance, classical ballets tend to be harder wearing on shoes than contemporary choreographies, as the former usually feature pas de deux which require the female role to support their weight on one leg for extended periods.
- Dance technique: Improper technique subjects shoes to unusual stresses that may lead to premature failure. Dancers who primarily spring onto pointe (sometimes called Russian pointe technique) will generally be harder on their shoes than those who roll onto pointe.
- Fit: Well fitting pointe shoes encourage proper technique, which in turn leads to longer shoe life.
- Weight: Greater dancer weight exerts proportionally greater stresses to the shoes, leading to faster wear.
- Construction: Varying qualities and types of construction will yield different life expectancies. Most synthetic or part synthetic shoes have a longer lifespan than fully traditional shoes.
- Shank material: The stiffness and integrity of various shank materials will degrade at varying rates.
- Breaking-in: The breaking-in process simulates accelerated wear, and thus may shorten the life of a shoe.
- Performance surface: Rough surfaces cause rapid wear of the exterior fabric, in contrast to smooth surfaces such as Marley floors, which minimize the rate of fabric wear.
- Foot Strength: Stronger arch muscles may exert greater force on the shank, causing it to bend more and thus accelerating its wear. Dancers with very flexible feet bend the shank further, which may also decrease lifespan.
- Environment: Traditionally manufactured shoes often contain glues which are sensitive to high heat and humidity, so die faster in warm and humid areas. Additionally, a warm environment will cause the dancer to sweat more, increasing moisture in the shoes and accelerating the break down process.

== See also ==
- Ballet shoe
- List of shoe styles
- Category:Pointe shoe manufacturers
