= Birmingham Hippodrome =

Theatre in Birmingham, England

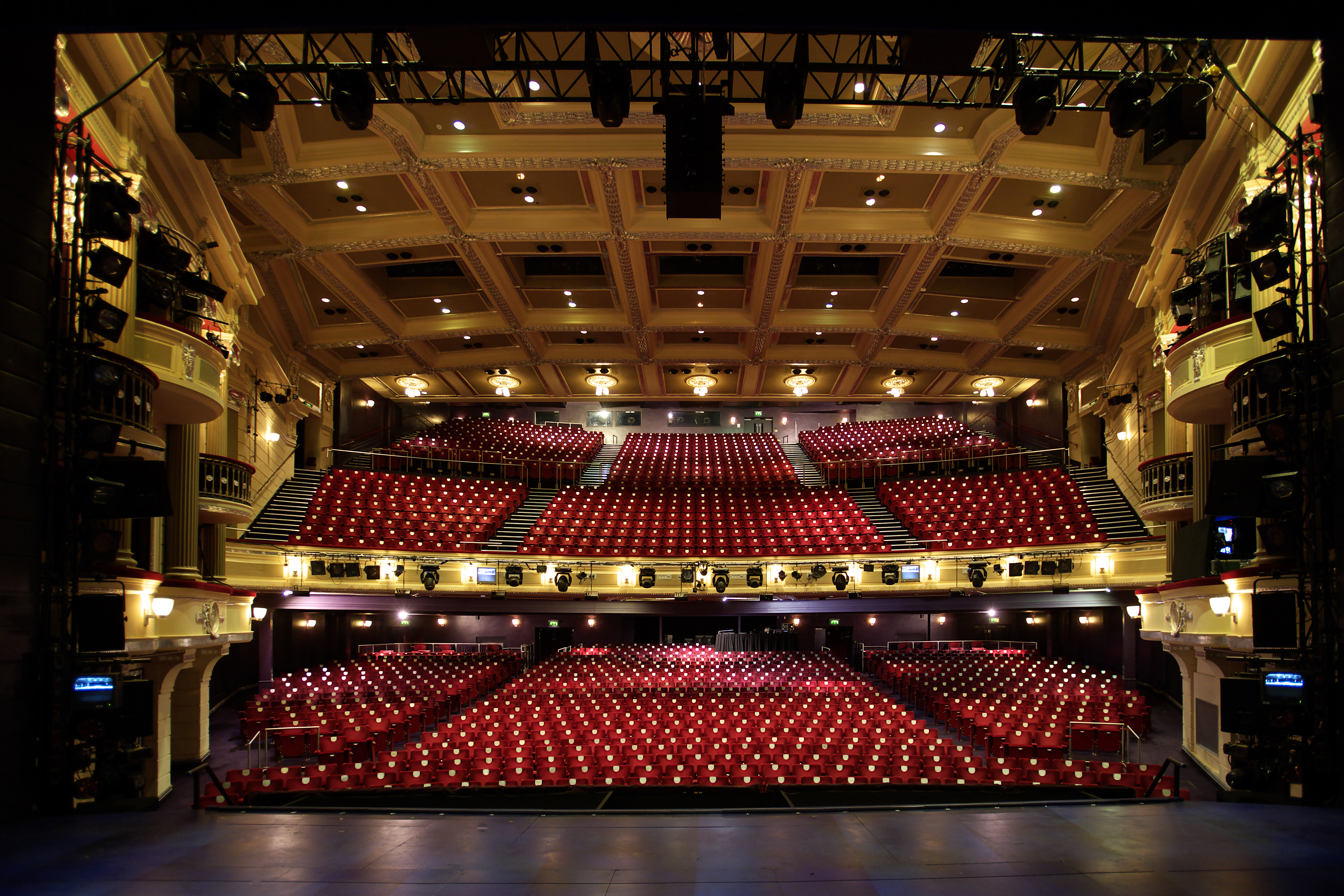
- Birmingham Hippodrome
- Interactive map of Birmingham Hippodrome
- Address: Hurst Street; Birmingham; England
- Coordinates: 52.4746°N 1.8976°W
- Operator: Birmingham Hippodrome Theatre Trust
- Capacity: 1,935 seats
- Current use: Ballet, Opera, West End shows, Pantomime and Drama

Construction
- Opened: 1895

Website
- www.birminghamhippodrome.com

The Birmingham Hippodrome is a theatre situated on Hurst Street in the Chinese Quarter of Birmingham, England.

Although best known as the home stage of the Birmingham Royal Ballet, it also hosts a wide variety of other performances including visiting opera and ballet companies, touring West End shows, pantomime and drama.

With a regular annual attendance of over 600,000, the Hippodrome is the busiest single theatre in the United Kingdom, and the busiest venue for dance outside London.

== History ==
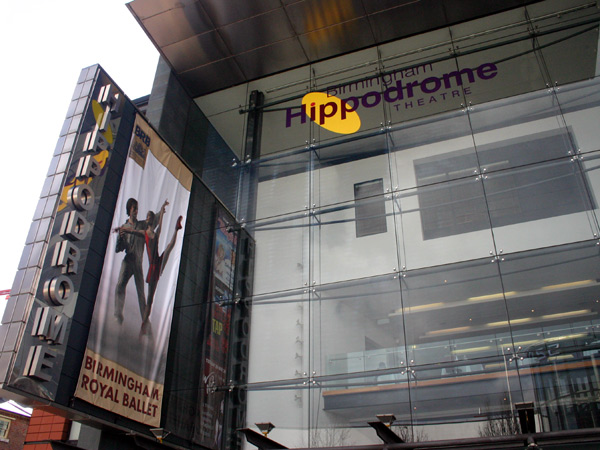
Banner advertising the Birmingham Royal Ballet at the Birmingham Hippodrome

The first venue built on the Hippodrome site was a building of assembly rooms in 1895. In 1899 the venue was redesigned by local architect F. W. Lloyd, a stage and circus ring was added together with a Moorish tower (removed 1963) and the enterprise named it the "Tower of Varieties". After failing, this was soon rebuilt as a normal variety theatre, reopened as the "Tivoli" in 1900, finally becoming "The Hippodrome" under the ownership of impresario Thomas Barrasford in October 1903. The current neo-classical auditorium seats 1,900 and was designed by Burdwood and Mitchell in 1924. Following the construction of the nearby Smallbrook Queensway, the entrance building and tower were demolished in 1963, and a new modern entrance constructed. At the same time, the theatre was renamed 'Birmingham Theatre' for a time.

In the 1970s it was sold to Birmingham City Council, and has since 1979 operated under the Birmingham Hippodrome Theatre Trust, a registered charity.

This plain facade was refaced in the 1980s with a mock-Victorian plasterwork, while the stagehouse was demolished and rebuilt to accommodate larger shows. The decade also saw the theatre host the Central Television revival of the ITV talent show New Faces, hosted by Marti Caine.

== Present day ==
The exterior of the theatre was substantially rebuilt by Associated Architects and Law and Dunbar-Nasmith in 2001, with a new glass facade and accommodation for the Birmingham Royal Ballet and additional performance space.

The Hippodrome has since presented large scale West End touring musicals and plays, such as Blood Brothers, Wicked, The Lion King, Matilda, Mary Poppins, Annie, Grease, Les Misérables, The Phantom of the Opera, War Horse, Billy Elliot, Mamma Mia!, We Will Rock You, The Curious Incident of the Dog in the Night-Time, Hamilton and Mrs. Doubtfire .

The theatre has also hosted numerous dance productions from Matthew Bourne's company New Adventures such as Swan Lake, Nutcracker!, Edward Scissorhands and The Red Shoes.

In July 2015, comedian and actor Brian Conley was celebrated at the end of a performance of Barnum, having performed at the Hippodrome for 600 performances, appearing in six pantomimes, Jolson, Chitty Chitty Bang Bang, Hairspray, Oliver! and hosting the 1999 Royal Variety Performance at the theatre.

On 8 October 2020 it was announced that Birmingham City Council had given the green light to a phased redevelopment of the theatre, to create a new facade together with a first floor terrace and creating an outdoor seating area with access to refreshment areas and a new restaurant on the third floor. Work is due to commence in early 2021.

In September 2022, the theatre presented the world premiere of Peaky Blinders: The Redemption of Thomas Shelby by Rambert Dance, based on the TV series of the same name, prior to touring the country and returning to the Hippodrome, before being filmed for the BBC.

In September 2023, the world premiere of Birmingham Royal Ballet's Black Sabbath: The Ballet opened at the theatre with band member Tony Iommi appearing during the finale on the opening night. The ballet was revived in September 2025 with Iommi appearing again during the opening night finale.

== Royal Variety Performance ==
On 28 November 1999 the Royal Variety Performance was staged at the Birmingham Hippodrome. This was the first time it had been held in Birmingham and outside of London since 1959, when it was held in Manchester. The performance was attended by HM Queen Elizabeth II and was presented by Brian Conley. The production was produced by LWT for ITV Productions and starred; Steps, Bradley Walsh, Paul Zerdin, Westlife, Ken Dodd, Leann Rimes, Joe Pasquale and the headline act Barry Manilow.

== Pantomime ==
The theatre's Christmas pantomimes are produced by Crossroads Pantomimes (previously Qdos Entertainment) over recent years attracting stars such as Brian Conley, Don Maclean, Julian Clary, Joe Pasquale, John Barrowman, The Grumbleweeds, Paul Zerdin, Ray Quinn, Joan Collins, Nigel Havers, Keith Harris, Lynda Bellingham, Basil Brush, Lesley Joseph, Gok Wan, John Partridge, Stephanie Beacham, Gary Wilmot, Jane McDonald, Duncan James, Chris Gascoyne, Marti Pellow, Lee Mead, The Krankies, Steve McFadden, Jodie Prenger, Beverley Knight, Danny Mac, Suzanne Shaw, Jimmy Osmond, Darren Day, Meera Syal, Jaymi Hensley, Joe McElderry, Faye Brookes, Jason Donovan, Alexia McIntosh, Ranj Singh, Alison Hammond, Samantha Womack, Faye Tozer, Matt Cardle, Christopher Biggins, Rylan and Zoe Birkett. Comedian and actor Matt Slack has starred since 2013, returning every year due to popular demand.

Over the last few seasons the Hippodrome has been the theatre where the pantomime from the London Palladium has then gone to the following season, including sets and costumes and revised scripts. This season 2026/27 will see Sleeping Beauty back at the Hippodrome after the production premiered last year with Catherine Tate and Julian Clary, and next season 2027/28 will see Cinderella return to the Hippodrome once again.

== Sources ==
- Pevsner Architectural Guides - Birmingham, Andy Foster, 2005, ISBN 0-300-10731-5
