= Jonathan Ollivier =

British ballet dancer (1977–2015)

- Born: Jonathan Byrne Ollivier; 26 April 1977; Northampton, England
- Died: 9 August 2015 (aged 38); Clerkenwell, Central London
- Occupation: Ballet dancer
- Spouse: Desiré Samaai (divorced)
- Children: 2

Jonathan Byrne Ollivier (26 April 1977 – 9 August 2015) was a British dancer.

== Biography ==
Born in Northampton, he began his dance journey at The Fairweather School of Dancing before completing his study of both classical ballet and contemporary at the Rambert Ballet School. After graduating in 1996, he joined CAPAB (since renamed the Cape Town City Ballet). He became a principal before returning to England in 1999 to join Northern Ballet Theatre (now Northern Ballet) as Principal. Before leaving he married South African principal ballerina Desiré Samaai in Paarl, Cape Town. Ollivier joined the Alberta Ballet Company as a Principal dancer in 2007. Ollivier was a strong partner, fine actor and a dancer of extraordinary physical and emotional intensity.

Ollivier died on 9 August 2015 in a motorbike accident hours before he was due to perform on stage in the title role of New Adventures' The Car Man. On 11 April 2017, the car driver involved in the accident was cleared of causing death by careless driving.

A special performance - Mr Wonderful: A Celebration of Jonathan Ollivier's Life in Dance - was staged at Sadler's Wells in honour of Ollivier on 18 January 2016. The performance included extracts from The Car Man, Matthew Bourne's Swan Lake and Sleeping Beauty. New Adventures principal dancers Richard Winsor, Sam Archer, Simon Williams and James Leece performed in the sold-out evening, which was hosted by Sir Matthew Bourne and featured over 80 performers - including many former colleagues of Ollivier. Income from the event was placed in charitable trust funds for Ollivier's two young sons.

== Notable roles ==
- The Swan/The Stranger in Matthew Bourne's Swan Lake
- Stanley in A Streetcar Named Desire
- Dracula in Dracula
- Athos in The Three Musketeers
- Heathcliff in Wuthering Heights
- Death in Requiem
- Hyde in Jekyll and Hyde

== Awards ==
- Nominated as Outstanding Young Male Artist in National Dance Awards, 2002
- Nominated as Best Male Dancer in National Dance Awards, 2003–2004
- Honorary Fellowship from the University of Northampton, 2006
