= Etta Murfitt =

British dancer and choreographer

Etta Murfitt MBE
- Born: 29 July 1966 (age 60); Walthamstow, London, England
- Occupations: Choreographer, dancer, actress
- Years active: 1989–present
- Website: new-adventures.net

Etta Jane Bertschinger MBE (née Murfitt; born 29 July 1966) is a British dancer, choreographer and the associate director of the New Adventures educational strand. She has worked for Matthew Bourne for over 20 years in a variety of different roles. She teaches throughout the UK and abroad for dance companies and dance institutions, as well as being a freelance faculty member of the London Contemporary Dance School and Young Place.

== Career ==
Murfitt trained at the London Contemporary Dance School. Murfitt is a founding member of Images Dance Company, and has also danced with the Scottish Dance Theatre, Arc Dance Company and Aletta Collins Dance Company. She teaches widely, teaching as the Rehearsal Director for Shobana Jeyasingh Dance Company. Etta Murfitt is a freelance faculty member of London Contemporary Dance School and the Young Place, both in London. Apart from her extensive work with Matthew Bourne, Murfitt has also appeared on TV in shows such as Mrs Hartley & The Growth Centre and Aletta Collins' Storm (both produced by BBC TV) and choreographed Le Nozze di Figaro (Holland Park Opera), The Way of the World (Wilton's Music Hall) and A Midsummer Night's Dream (Albery Theatre, London).

Murfitt has danced with Matthew Bourne's companies AMP and New Adventures for over 20 years. She has created many roles in Bourne's work, including Clara in Nutcracker!, Rita in The Car Man and Peg Boggs in Edward Scissorhands. She currently also serves as Artistic Associate and Associate Director for all the companies' productions. She has worked with New Adventures since its foundation.

Murfitt was appointed Member of the Order of the British Empire (MBE) in the 2022 Birthday Honours for services to dance.

== Acting ==
Murfitt has played and created many roles in Bourne's work including the original productions of the following:

Year	Role	Name
1989		The Infernal Galop
1991		Town and Country
1992	Clara	Nutcracker!
1994	Madge	Highland Fling
1995		Swan Lake
1997		Cinderella
2000	Rita	The Car Man
2005	Peg Boggs	Edward Scissorhands

== Credits ==
=== Choreography ===
Her choreography credits include

- Le nozze di Figaro directed by Martin Lloyd-Evans for Holland Park Opera
- The Way of the World directed by Selina Cadell at Wilton's Music Hall
- Restaging AMP's Nutcracker! (Sadler's Wells)
- Restaging AMP's The Infernal Galop for Images of Dance (2007) and Sarasota Ballet, Florida (2008)
- A Midsummer Night's Dream with Dawn French, directed by Matthew Francis at the Albery Theatre

- Restaging New Adventures' Dorian Gray in Japan, July 2013
- Kneehigh Theatre: Choreographer, The Wild Bride (2013)
- Kneehigh Theatre: Choreographer, Dead Dog in a Suitcase, Everyman Theatre, Liverpool (2014)
- New Adventures: Associate Artistic Director and Choreographer, Sleeping Beauty
- A Midsummer Nights Dream, Shakespeare's Globe (2016)
- New Adventures: Associate Artistic Director and Choreographer, The Red Shoes (2016)

=== Film Credits ===
- Film credits include:
- Clara in Nutcracker! (BBC/NVC)
- Rita in The Car Man (Channel 4)
- Rehearsal Director Swan Lake (BBC)
- Late Flowering Lust (BBC)
- Roald Dahl's Red Riding Hood (BBC)
- Mrs Hartley and the Growth Centre (BBC)
- Storm (Aletta Collins/BBC Dance for the Camera)

=== Stage Credits ===
Her stage credits include: For NA and AMP: Associate Director and creation of the role of Peg Boggs in Edward Scissorhands (London, UK tour, Japan, Korea, USA, Australia, Athens, Antwerp), Associate Director for restaging of Highland Fling (Sadler's Wells, UK tour and Japanese tour), Associate Director and recreation of the role of Clara in Nutcracker! (London, UK tours, Far East tour and US tour), Associate Director and creation of the role of Rita in The Car Man (Old Vic, UK tour, European tour, US tour and Japanese tour), Rehearsal Director for the original production of Swan Lake at Sadler's Wells and UK tour, roles including French and Spanish Princesses and The Queen in Swan Lake (West End, Los Angeles, Broadway), Rehearsal Director and creation of the role of Judy in Cinderella (West End and Los Angeles), creation of the role of Madge in Highland Fling, The Infernal Galop, The Percys of Fitzrovia, Deadly Serious and Town & Country; Clara in the original production of Nutcracker! (Opera North and Sadler Wells) and Matron/Queen Candy in the 2007/08 production; founder member and dancer with Images Dance Theatre Scottish Dance Theatre; Arc Dance Company; and created the role of Netta in This is the Picture with Aletta Collins Dance Company for Dance Umbrella.
