= Ashley Shaw (dancer) =

Australian ballet dancer (born 1990)

- Born: 1990 (age 35–36)
- Education: Elmhurst Ballet School
- Years active: 2009–present
- Spouse: Adam Maskell (m. 2022)

Ashley Shaw (born 1990) is an Australian ballet dancer who regularly performs leading roles with Matthew Bourne's New Adventures. She debuted the leading role in Bourne's Cinderella in 2009. In 2016 Matthew Bourne cast her as Vicky Page in his adaptation of The Red Shoes. Shaw played Aurora in Bourne's 2022 Sleeping Beauty staging. She has also danced the parts of femme fatale Lana in The Car Man and Princess Sugar in Bourne's Nutcracker!, and appeared in his version of Swan Lake with all-male swans.

== Early life and education ==
Shaw grew up in Nelson Bay, north of Sydney, Australia, and has danced since she was three years old. Her three siblings – two sisters and a brother – are also dancers.

At the age of 12, Shaw decided to start full-time dance training in ballet, contemporary, and jazz, studying with Marie Walton-Mahon at her dance school in Newcastle, New South Wales. A recipient of the Royal Academy of Dance Solo Seal, she was a semi-finalist at the Genée International Ballet Competition in Athens, Greece. In 2005, at the age of 15, she left Australia to study at Elmhurst Ballet School in Birmingham, England.

== Personal life ==
In September 2022 at Chelsea Town Hall and Hengrave Hall, Shaw married Adam Maskell, a former dancer turned talent agent. The couple reside in Battersea.
