= Ashley Shaw =

Ashley Shaw may refer to:

- Ashley Shaw (cricketer)
- Ashley Shaw (dancer)
