= Late Flowering Lust =

1994 British television film

- Title screen
- Genre: Comedy drama
- Directed by: David Hinton
- Starring: Nigel Hawthorne; Richenda Carey; Jonathan Cecil
- Composer: Jim Parker
- Country of origin: United Kingdom
- Original language: English

Production
- Executive producers: Avril MacRory; Douglas Rae
- Producer: Caroline Speed
- Cinematography: Nic Knowland
- Editor: Jon Costelloe
- Running time: 53 minutes
- Production company: Ecosse Films

Original release
- Network: BBC2
- Release: 8 May 1994

Late Flowering Lust is a television film starring Nigel Hawthorne, based on the poetry of John Betjeman. Produced by Caroline Speed and directed by David Hinton, it first aired on BBC2 on 8 May 1994. The film features performances by the dancers of Adventures in Motion Pictures, set to the music of Jim Parker.

== Synopsis ==
When Cousin John is invited to a pre-War weekend house party in Home Counties Betjeman land, he is taken aback by the beauty of the gels. His hosts, the Faircloughs, are of the older generation and the daughter and all her friends are of the younger one. The bright young things cavort through their social litany: tennis, golf, swimming, cycling, even a pheasant shoot. Cousin John is left on the fringes of the activity, watching wistfully.

== Cast ==
- Nigel Hawthorne as Cousin John
- Richenda Carey as Mrs Fairclough
- Jonathan Cecil as Mr Fairclough

Rosemary Allen, Scott Ambler, Matthew Bourne, Ally Fitzpatrick, Maxine Fone, Andrew George, Etta Murfitt and Simon Murphy from Adventures in Motion Pictures portray the bright young things.

== Production ==
Late Flowering Lust arose from Nigel Hawthorne's appreciation for Betjeman's poetry and was originally conceived as a theatre production by Hawthorne and his partner, Trevor Bentham. However, when approached by producer Douglas Rae, they opted for a film version to keep open the possibility of a later stage run. They proposed involving Adventures in Motion Pictures and inviting Matthew Bourne to choreograph the film. Hawthorne, portraying Cousin John, described the character as "an amalgam of Betjeman, myself and my father".

Filming took place over two weeks in the summer of 1993. The house featured was Benington Lordship, near Stevenage in Hertfordshire. The park and gardens of Benington Lordship and the 19th-century gatehouse also featured in the production.

Jim Parker's music, originally composed for the albums Banana Blush, Late Flowering Love (both 1974) and Varsity Rag (1981), was performed by the Nash Ensemble under Parker's direction. Hawthorne recited the poetry of John Betjeman.

Hawthorne mentioned in a 1994 interview that a stage version was planned for the following February, but it never came to fruition.

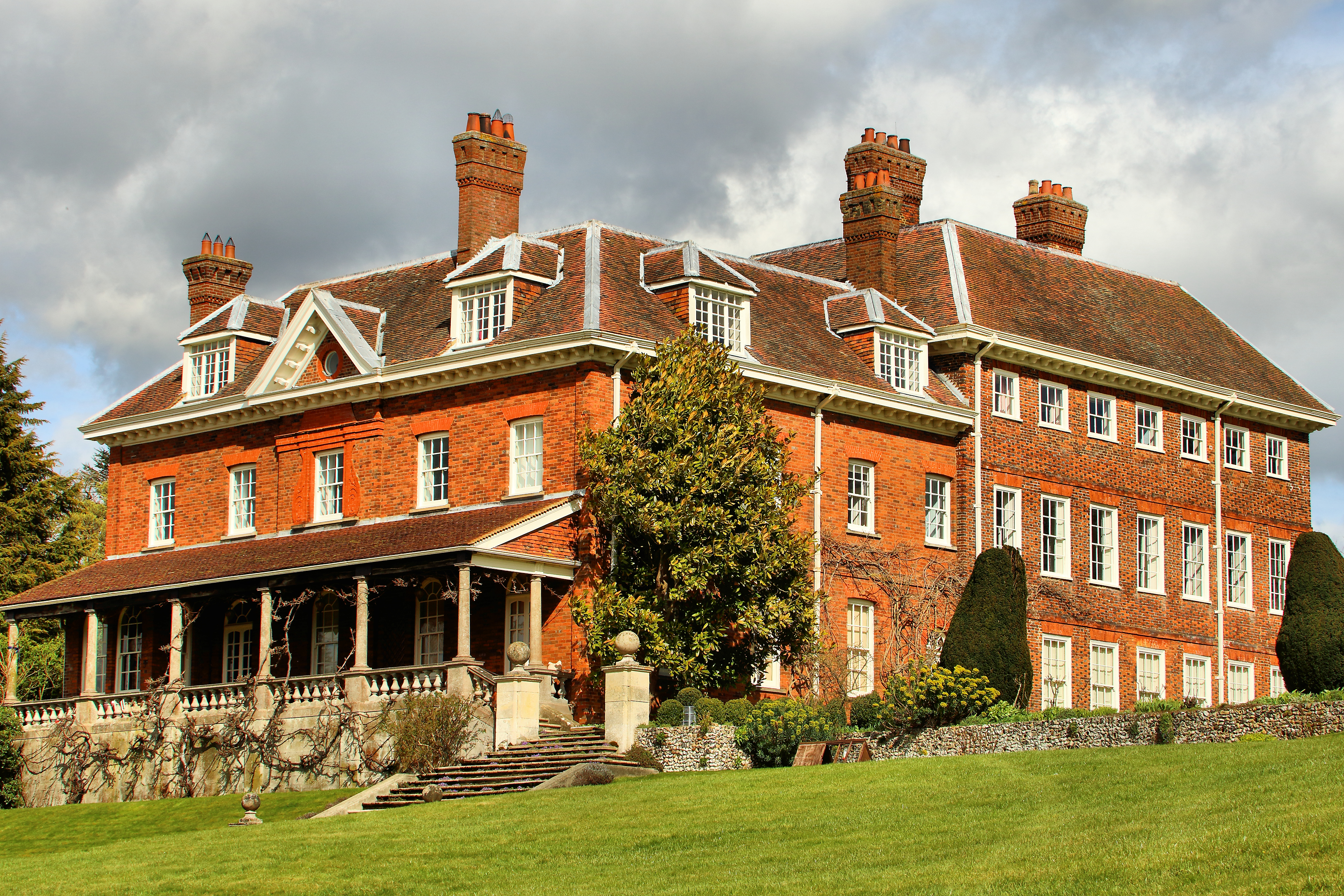
Benington Lordship features in the comedy drama

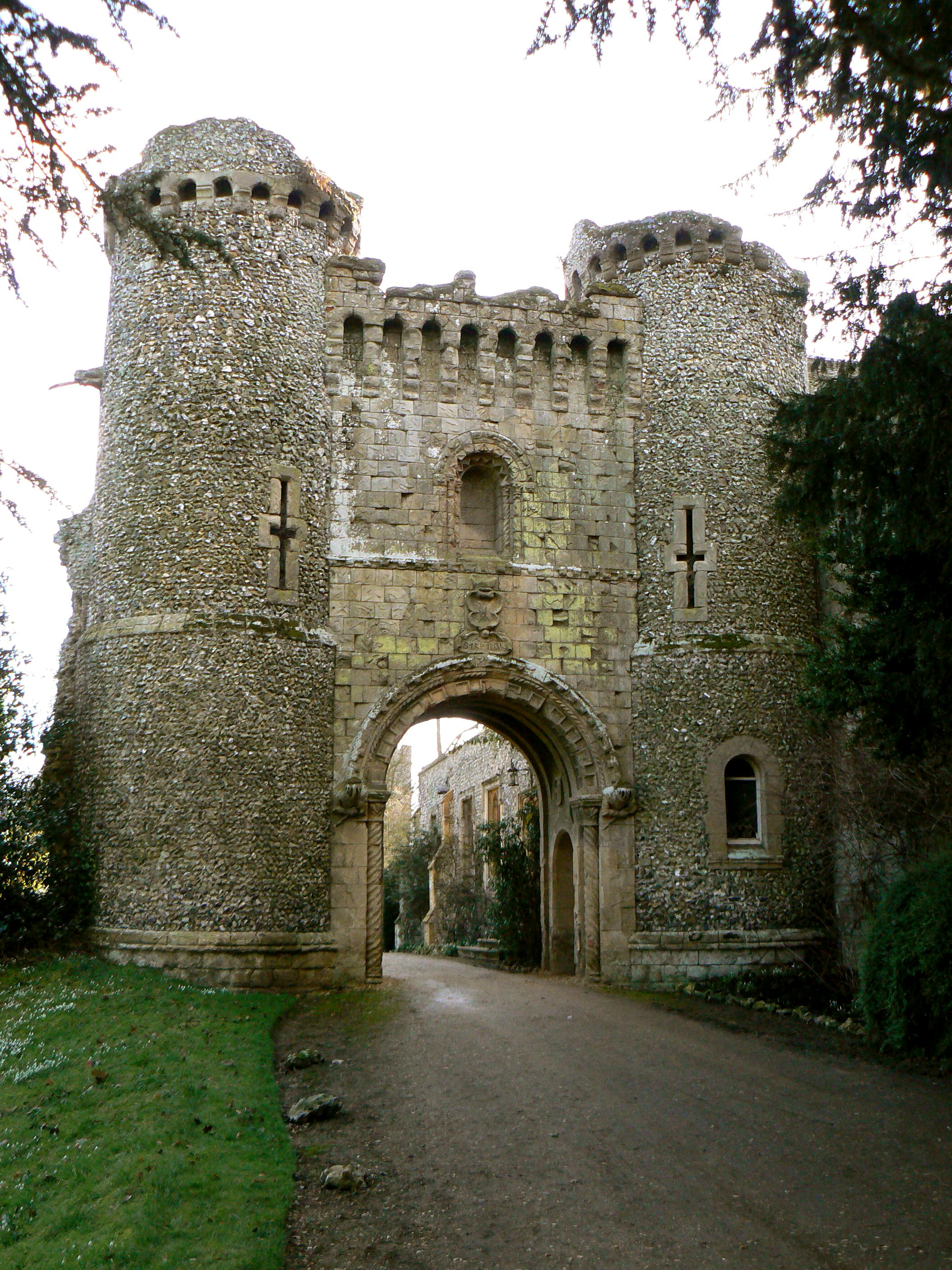
The 19th-century gatehouse

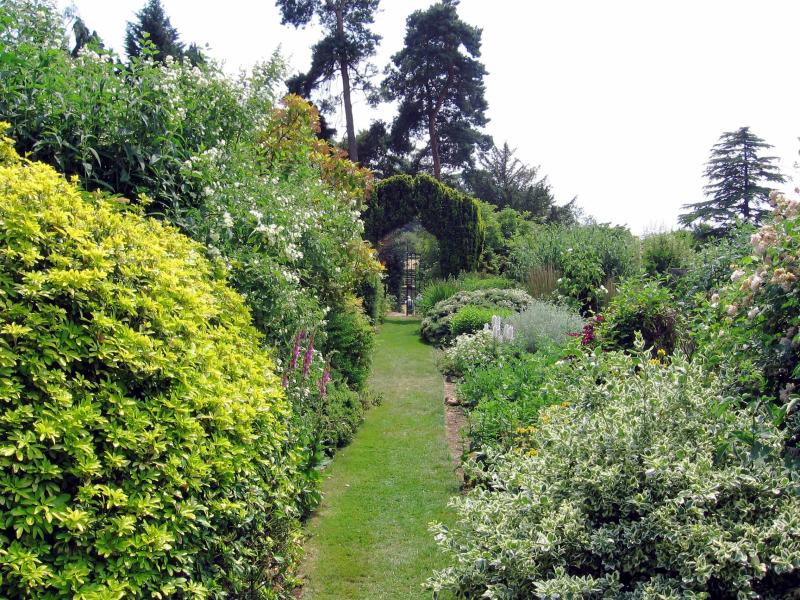
The gardens of Benington Lordship

== Reception ==
Late Flowering Lust received widespread praise following its initial broadcast.

Max Davidson notes that "the point about lust for Betjeman was that it was real and potent and ubiquitous", while saying that "Hawthorne simpering at a girl in tennis shorts was experiencing nothing stronger than the humiliation Sir Humphrey Appleby might feel if his secretary turned up in a short skirt."

=== Accolades ===
Late Flowering Lust was nominated for a Golden Rose of Montreux television award.

== Home video ==
The film was only ever released on VHS, so it is not available on DVD.

== Sources ==
- "Betjeman's Banana Blush". BBC Radio 4. 27 July 2014.
- Boone, Mike (30 October 1994). "CBC show finds holes in Swiss legal system". The Gazette.
- Davidson, Max (9 May 1994). "The dark side of Doyle's Dublin". The Daily Telegraph.
- Duncan, Andrew (7–13 May 1994). ""If I'd had more courage, my life would have been totally different"". Radio Times.
- "Good Lord! Nigel laments past on suitable grounds". Hertfordshire Mercury. 6 May 1994.
- "Lamenting lost youth". The Courier & Advertiser. 7 May 1994.
- Lebrecht, Norman (3 February 2024). "Ruth Leon recommends... Late Flowering Lust – John Betjeman and Matthew Bourne". Slipped Disc.
- Pratt, Steve (6 May 1994). "Nigel's dance drama is poetry in motion". The Northern Echo.
- Shaw, Ted (27 October 1994). "Repressed romantic". Windsor Star.
- "Vintage Adventures: Late Flowering Lust". New Adventures. 26 March 2020.
