= Jason Piper =

British actor

Jason Piper is a British actor and professional dancer whom, notably, provided the voice of the centaur Bane in the fifth film adaptation of the Harry Potter series, Harry Potter and the Order of the Phoenix.

In 2002, Piper toured as a dancer with Australian singer Kylie Minogue on her KylieFever2002 tour. Four years later, he again joined Kylie for her Showgirl: Homecoming Live Tour (2006).

Piper danced the principal role of the Swan in Matthew Bourne's Swan Lake for two seasons in London, as well as travelling in the production's world tour. Additionally, he appeared in Bourne's Dorian Gray, as Basil, in Summer 2009 and completed an international tour.

Piper is a tutor and the Head of Dance at Kingston University, with choreography credits for many shows. He formerly played in two bands, CREON and GUS.

== Partial filmography ==
- Harry Potter and the Order of the Phoenix (2007) – Centaur
