= Edward Scissorhands (dance) =

2005 dance adaptation of a film

- Original promotional artwork
- Choreographer: Matthew Bourne
- Music: Terry Davies (New music); Danny Elfman (Original film music)
- Based on: Edward Scissorhands (1990 film)
- Premiere: November 14, 2005; Theatre Royal, Plymouth
- Original ballet company: New Adventures
- Genre: Contemporary dance

Edward Scissorhands is a contemporary dance adaptation of the 1990 American romance fantasy film Edward Scissorhands, created by Matthew Bourne, with music by Terry Davies. The screenwriter and composer of the film version, Caroline Thompson and Danny Elfman, helped to develop the dance version, which is set in the 1950s (the film is set in the late 1980s). The story is told entirely through music and dance with no discourse although the plot is similar to the movie.

The piece debuted in London in 2005 and, despite mixed reviews, has subsequently toured in Britain, Asia, the U.S. (earning a 2007 Drama Desk Award for Unique Theatrical Experience), Australia and Europe. The productions have been put on by Bourne's New Adventures dance company.

== Composition and development ==
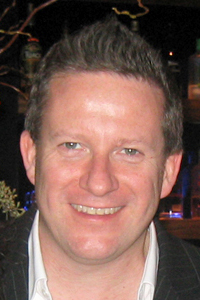
Matthew Bourne, the creator of the dance adaptation of Edward Scissorhands, during the Australian tour in 2008

Bourne's all-male 1995 version of Swan Lake has become the longest-running ballet production and earned him the distinction as the only British director to become a winner of both the Tony Award for Best Direction of a Musical and the Tony Award for Best Choreography at the 53rd Tony Awards in 1999. In 2002, 2003 and 2005, he earned the Laurence Olivier Award for Best Theatre Choreographer for My Fair Lady, Play Without Words and Mary Poppins, respectively. Eventually (in 2008), Time would begin an article on Bourne with the following summary: "Matthew Bourne is the world's most popular living dance maker."

Bourne was asked by composer friends to brainstorm about films that could be adapted into stage productions in his dance style. Thompson met Bourne in 1997 through Alan Cumming after already having seen Swan Lake. Bourne asked Thompson's consent to adapt the Scissorhands film the following year, but it took another seven years to obtain the necessary funding and get the film's director Tim Burton and composer Elfman to go along. The work, which Bourne choreographed, was developed as dance theatre instead of as a traditional musical and has no singing or speaking. The musical score is by Terry Davies, but it includes significant portions of Elfman's film score.

Thompson claims Scissorhands is based on a pet dog of hers. She described her dog as follows: "She was the most soulful, yearning creature I ever met. She wanted to participate in everything. She didn’t need language to communicate. She communicated with her eyes." She described the character as similar to Frankenstein's monster and Pinocchio in the sense that he is "an outsider who wants to be an insider".

== Plot ==
The work "tells the gothic story of a boy, created by an eccentric inventor, trying to adapt to suburban life with only scissors for hands." The dance version is set in the 1950s, unlike the 1990 film, which was set in the late 1980s.

An inventor's son was electrocuted in a dungeon-like room while holding scissors. In his grief, the inventor creates another "son" with flashing scissors for hands. The creation is orphaned when unsavory characters frighten his father to death with some Halloween activities. He then ventures from his gothic origins into a suburban town where his loneliness is reinforced until he is taken in by Peg Boggs and adopted by both her family and the town.

"As portrayed by Johnny Depp 17 years ago in the movie by Tim Burton, Edward Scissorhands was many things to many people: a wild child, an artist, a sex symbol, a freak, a killer through little fault of his own and finally the phantom of a love long lost. As reborn in a new theater piece by Matthew Bourne, Edward is all these things and perhaps something more: the latest member of the select circle of semianimate figures who have found a lasting home in dance."

—The New York Times, Matthew Gurewitsch

In the promotional video for the American debut, Bourne highlights the juxtaposition of the gothic horror setting and the suburban settings of the adaptation. He also notes that San Francisco was a good place for the United States debut of the work in part because as a city it exhibits a tolerance similar to that of the suburbanites in the work. The piece has no spoken words. Like in the film, Edward is equipped with only scissors for hands because his inventor died in the middle of outfitting him. He is discovered in his castle by an Avon lady who brings him into her home. He then wanders into a town where a family takes him in. The theatrical adaptation has a more robust prologue than the film, but the additional backstory does not add content to the character.

== Production history ==
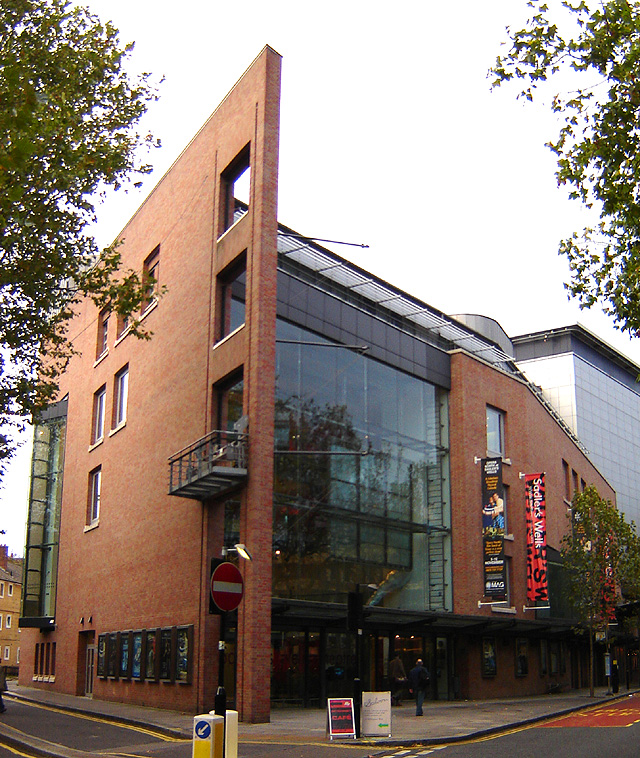
Sadler's Wells Theatre in London, where the show premiered in November 2005

The British New Adventures dance company raised $2 million that was augmented by $780,000 from the Arts Council England to stage the original production at London's Sadler's Wells Theatre, (following a run at the Theatre Royal, Plymouth) which opened on 30 November 2005 and closed on February 5, 2006. Eventually, the show was staged in Asia, the United States, Australia and Europe with New Adventures. The dance adaptation featured 30 members of the company. Martin McCallum and Marc Platt were the lead producers.

Sam Archer and Richard Winsor alternated in the main role, wearing a heavily elasticized costume with fiberglass blades and a thick leather forearm brace. They also starred in the following tour, with Archer staying on through the U.S. tour. Regular Bourne collaborators Scott Ambler and Etta Murfitt were associate directors and co-stars. Set and costume design were both by Lez Brotherston in a style described as a sort of Desperate Housewives suburbia of mild-mannered characters. His 1950s suburbia sets were inspired by Peggy Sue Got Married and Back to the Future. Howard Harrison designed lights and Paul Groothuis was sound designer.

Following its 11-week London run, it had a United Kingdom tour that lasted for 14 weeks and that was followed by performances in Japan, Korea and the United States, where it ran until Spring 2007. In November and December 2006, it played in San Francisco at the Orpheum Theatre, where it made its American debut with previews on November 11 and 12 and a November 14 opening. In February 2007, it played at the Kennedy Center in Washington, D.C. It spent part of April and May at the 5th Avenue Theatre in Seattle. The New York run was held at the Brooklyn Academy of Music. Other venues on the United States tour included Ahmanson Theatre in Los Angeles, Belk Theatre in Charlotte, North Carolina, Benedum Center in Pittsburgh, Pennsylvania, Kimmel Center in Philadelphia, Pennsylvania and Fox Theatre in St. Louis, Missouri. By the time it played in Brooklyn, it had visited a dozen North American cities.

In May 2008, an Australian national tour was launched at the Sydney Opera House (with New Adventures being the first British dance company to perform there with the production). The piece returned to Europe for a 2008–09 tour that included performances in Britain for the 2008 Christmas season. Venues on the Europe tour included Théâtre du Châtelet in Paris, Hippodrome Theatre in Birmingham, New Wimbledon Theatre and Sadler's Wells Theatre in London as well as stops in Salford, Athens and Antwerp. Among the cities that it sold out are New York, Los Angeles, San Francisco, Sydney, Melbourne and Paris.

In November 2014, another UK tour opened at the Theatre Royal, Plymouth before heading on an 18-week tour to Glasgow, Salford and another Christmas season at the Sadler's Wells Theatre. In 2015 it headed to Woking, Nottingham, Liverpool, Norwich, Birmingham, Milton Keynes, Bradford and Southampton.

In November 2023, another UK tour opened again at the Theatre Royal, Plymouth through to 2024, including another Christmas season at Sadler's Wells Theatre. It was also announced that a screening of the production would be shown in cinemas across the UK and internationally for the first time from 25 September 2024 (after being filmed at the Wales Millennium Centre, Cardiff in March).

== Reception ==
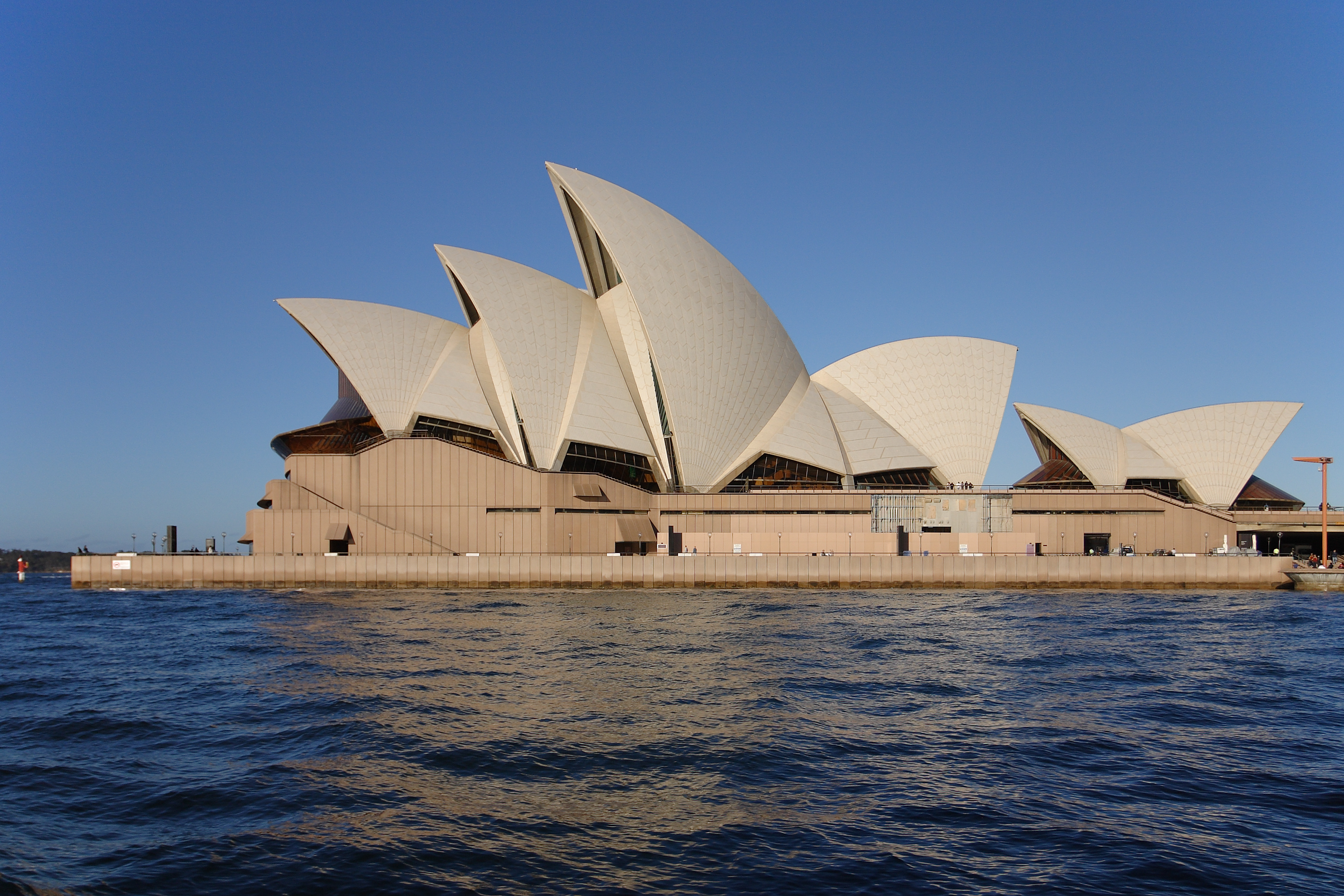
The 2008 Australian tour debuted at the Sydney Opera House.

The dance adaptation received mixed reviews. The earliest review of the London production by The New York Times in November 2005 said that like the film version, "doomed love story remains bittersweet". Matt Wolf of The New York Times panned the original run with statements such as "a potential dance sensation seems peculiarly short on actual dance" and "But a dream ballet late in the first act and various set pieces later seem, in terms of actual choreography, oddly pro forma for Bourne. . ." He felt that overcoming the obstacle of choreographing dances around a lead with blades for fingers was too much to overcome. A fellow critic from The New York Times described it as "visually alluring" two weeks later. On its Christmas 2008 return to England, The Times gave the show a positive review: "Matthew Bourne's adaptation of Tim Burton's 1990 film is one of the biggest and brightest of this season's glut of cultural ornaments. Indeed, so much skill has been lavished on this dance-theatre show for Bourne's company, New Adventures, that it almost feels churlish to withhold my affections." The Independent's reviewer was critical, saying "Edward is more kids' cartoon than satire, with two-dimensional characters that stand a hair's breadth from cliché". Another critic from The Independent opened her review as follows: "The best part of Matthew Bourne's Edward Scissorhands is the curtain call." However, contemporaneous reviews by The Guardian were a bit more positive saying that "Bourne is a natural storyteller, who never leaves his audience behind".

The work's American debut in San Francisco drew mixed reviews. Robert Hurwitt of the San Francisco Chronicle described it as a high point in his "Theatre Year in Review top 10", saying it was "invigoratingly choreographed and beguilingly designed". However, when analyzing the year from the entire Arts and culture perspective the Steven Winn (also with the San Francisco Chronicle) described the work as lacking, noting that its November run "fell well short of this show's [Swan Lake]'s inspired high mark" from March in the arts and culture year end top 10. Hurwitt stated at the beginning of the San Francisco run that "Where Bourne triumphs, with considerable help from Davies, Thompson and Brotherston, is in replicating Burton's delicately bittersweet whimsy in a manner uniquely his own."

Johnny Depp attended the December 30, 2006 show danced by Archer and signed a souvenir program for Bourne with the following partial inscription: "Trembled on the verge of tears, mate." At the time of its off-Broadway debut, The New York Times described it as not "so much a dance enhanced by a famous story as a drama condensed by the removal of words." It was further panned in a more detailed review the following week by The New York Times Jennifer Dunning, who said "Mr. Bourne's "Edward Scissorhands" is mostly a candy-coated bore." In Time, he was praised for the uniqueness of his dancing hedges.

=== Awards and nominations ===
The work received a nomination for the 2007 Drama Desk Award for Outstanding Choreography (for Bourne) and won the 2007 Drama Desk Award for Unique Theatrical Experience. Bourne was also nominated for Drama Desk Award for Outstanding Choreography that year for Mary Poppins.

Award	Outcome
2007 Drama Desk Awards
Unique Theatrical Experience	Won
Outstanding Choreography: Matthew Bourne	Nominated
