= Richenda Carey =

British actress (born 1948)

- Born: 29 April 1948 (age 78); Bitton, Gloucestershire, England
- Education: Rose Bruford College
- Occupation: Actress
- Years active: 1972–present

Richenda Carey (born 29 April 1948) is a British film, television, stage, and radio actress whose career has spanned more than five decades. Her screen work includes The Darling Buds of May, Monarch of the Glen, Criminal Justice, Colonia and Downton Abbey.

Carey's early television work includes Mike Leigh's "Nuts in May" (1976), made for the BBC's Play for Today strand, playing Miss Beale. She later appeared in another Mike Leigh production for Play for Today, Who's Who (1979), playing Lady Crouchurst.

Carey has performed extensively on the British and international stage. Her theatre career has included work at the National Theatre, where she appeared in the original 1991 production of The Madness of George III. She later joined the West End company of Calendar Girls at the Noël Coward Theatre in 2009, and in 2012 played Mrs Higgins in a Sheffield Crucible revival of My Fair Lady. Her stage work has also taken her to New York, where she appeared as Lady Knightsbridge in J. B. Priestley's The Roundabout at 59E59 Theaters as part of the 2017 Brits Off Broadway festival. More recent roles have included appearances in The Best Exotic Marigold Hotel and Summer 1954. In 2026, she played Lady Saltburn in a new production of Noël Coward's Present Laughter, which opened at the Theatre Royal Bath before embarking on a national tour.

== Film ==
Year	Title	Role	Notes
1980	Who's in Charge?	Secretary	
1981	Couples and Robbers	Registrar	
1982	A Shocking Accident	Susan	
1985	Morons from Outer Space	Countess Gretel	
1985	Florence Nightingale	Committee Lady	
1985	Lace II	Mrs Hale	
1988	The Woman He Loved	Maud Kerr-Smiley	
1989	Dealers	Mallory's Secretary	
1990	Strike It Rich	Miss Mullen	
1990	Dunrulin	Sister	
1994	Nostradamus	Countess	
1994	Late Flowering Lust	Mrs Fairclough	
1997	Photographing Fairies	Fierce Woman	
1997	Jane Eyre	Lady Ingram	
1997	Mrs Dalloway	Lady Bradshaw	
1998	Monk Dawson	Lady Toynton	
1999	Whatever Happened to Harold Smith?	Mary Blackcottage	
2000	Five Seconds to Spare	Police Officer	
2001	Crush	Lady Governor	
2001	Lara Croft: Tomb Raider	Imperious Woman	
2001	Hot Money	Judge Lucinda Winchcombe	
2003	Vacuums	Mrs Cartwright	Musical also known as Stealing Bess (US title)
2003	Looking for Victoria	Lady Wharncliffe	
2003	The Young Visiters	Lady Gay Finchline	
2005	Separate Lies	Sarah Tufnell	
2010	The Secret Diaries of Miss Anne Lister	Mrs Priestley	
2015	Colonia	Gisela	
2019	Downton Abbey	Mrs Webb	
2021	The Protégé	Mother Lucia	
2025	The Thursday Murder Club	Marjorie	
2027	Dangerous Romance		Post-production

== Television ==
Year	Title	Role	Notes
1974	Childhood	Woodcutter	Episode: "A Great Day for Bonzo"
1974	Upstairs, Downstairs	Head Nurse	Episode: "Tug of War"
1975	Within These Walls	Officer Budgen	Episode: "Let the People See"
1976	"Nuts in May"	Miss Beale	Play for Today
1977	The Muppet Show	Queen	
1978	Going to Work	Careers Officer	Episode: "What's the Choice?"
1979	"Who's Who"	Lady Crouchurst	Play for Today
1979	"Don't Be Silly"	Liz Charter	Play for Today
1982	P'tang, Yang, Kipperbang	Botany Teacher	TV movie
1982–1983	Nanny	Diana Curry-Rivel	Recurring role
1983	Jemima Shore Investigates	Vee Brewer	Episode: "A Promising Death"
1984	Lace	Mrs Hale	2 episodes
1984	Just Good Friends	Hilary Styles	Episode: "Special"
1985	Inside Out	Magistrate	
1985	Cover Her Face	Miss Bullard	
1985	The Detective	Miss Dawkins	2 episodes
1985	Storyboard	Lady in Buffet	Episode: "Ladies in Charge"
1985	C.A.T.S. Eyes	Mrs Granger Mrs Hargreaves	Episode #1.3 Episode #1.10
1986	To Have and to Hold	Norah	Episode #1.8
1986	Call Me Mister	Technician	Episode: "The Other Women"
1986	Only Fools and Horses	Lady at Opera	Episode: "A Royal Flush"
1986	The Insurance Man	Tall Woman	Screen Two
1987	Dear John	Miss Culver	Episode: "Once Bitten"
1987	A Perfect Spy	Nanny	Episode #1.1
1988	Gems	Mrs Evans	3 episodes
1988	Gentlemen and Players	Mrs Sampson	Episode: "Stags at Bay"
1988	Sunday Premiere	Betty Buckley	Episode: "Across the Lake"
1988	Lucky Sunil	Mrs Slipper	Screen Two
1989	Ticket to Ride	Nurse Kosztka	Episode: "It's Just the Gypsy in My Soul"
1989	Hannay	Marigold Hudspith	Episode: "The Confidence Man"
1989	The Play on One	Ann	Episode: "A Master of the Marionettes"
1989	Streetwise	Mrs Swithin	Episode: "Breaking In"
1989	Close to Home	Mavis	Episode: "Helen's Parents"
1990	Jeeves and Wooster	Lady Wickhammersley	Episode: "The Purity of the Turf"
1990	Waiting for God	Greta Mueller	Episode: "Fraulein Mueller"
1990	In Sickness and in Health	Lady in Garden	Episode: "Dogs"
1990	She-Wolf of London	Zelda	Episode: "Can't Keep a Dead Man Down: Part One"
1991	The Darling Buds of May	Lady Bluff-Gore	3 episodes
1991	Roy's Raiders	Beryl	Episode #1.3
1991	Bodger & Badger	Mrs. Bogart	7 episodes
1994	Late Flowering Lust	Mrs Fairclough	TV movie
1994	Wycliffe	Jane Rule	Episode: "The Tangled Web"
1994	Spacevets		Episode: "A Hero's Welcome"
1995	The Choir	Bridget Cavendish	Miniseries
1996	The Prince and the Pauper	Lady Milford	6 episodes
1997	Chalk	Mary Langland	Episode: "The New Student"
1997	Jane Eyre	Lady Ingram	TV movie
1997	Kavanagh QC	Pamela Erskine	Episode: "Blood Money"
1998	Mosley	Lady Mosley	Episode: "Young Man in a Hurry"
1998	dinnerladies	Lady Pamela	Episode: "Royals"
1998	Julia Jekyll and Harriet Hyde	Sister-Blister	Episode: "Astro-Nuts"
1999	Spaced	Dog Pound Clerk	Episode: "Battles"
2000	Victoria Wood: With All The Trimmings	Various	Christmas special
2003	Monarch of the Glen	Lady Dorothy Trumpington-Bonnet	5 episodes
2004	Midsomer Murders	Margaret Hopkins	Episode: "The Straw Woman"
2008	Criminal Justice	Judge Ira	4 episodes
2009	Desperate Romantics	Landlady	1 episode
2015	Residue	Evangeline Diehl	3 episodes
2017	Fallet	Mrs Brown	5 episodes
2019	Agatha Raisin	Olivia Witherspoon	Episode: "The Haunted House"

== Theatre credits ==
Year	Production	Role	Venue / company
1972	After Magritte		Bristol Old Vic
1972	Christmas Back in King Street	Mermaid	Bristol Old Vic
1972	Lulu		Bristol Old Vic
1972	Sky Blue Life		Bristol Old Vic
1973	The Double Dealer	Lady Froth	Bristol Old Vic / Hong Kong Arts Festival
1973	Out of Bounds		Bristol Old Vic
1973	Subject to Fits		Bristol Old Vic
1973	The Taming of the Shrew		Bristol Old Vic / Hong Kong Arts Festival
1974	When We Are Married		Bristol Old Vic
1975	Afore Night Come		Bristol Old Vic
1979	Oh! What a Lovely War		Bristol Old Vic
1986–1987	Mumbo Jumbo	Mrs Howlett	Royal Exchange, Manchester / Lyric Hammersmith
1991	Rookery Nook	Gertrude Twine	Greenwich Theatre
1991–1994	The Madness of George III	Lady Pembroke	National Theatre / national and international tour
1994	Abelard and Heloise	The Abbess	Bristol Old Vic
1995	Black Comedy	Miss Furnival	Watford Theatre
1996	Swanwhite	The Stepmother	Gate Theatre
2000	A Woman of No Importance	Lady Hunstanton	Royal Exchange, Manchester
2009–2010	Calendar Girls	Marie	Noël Coward Theatre / national tour
2012	My Fair Lady	Mrs Higgins	Sheffield Crucible
2013	Housewife 49	Mrs Waite	The Old Laundry
2016–2017	The Roundabout	Lady Knightsbridge	Park Theatre, London / 59E59 Theaters, New York
2023	The Best Exotic Marigold Hotel	Dorothy	Simon Friend Entertainment
2023	Roman Holiday	Countess	Theatre Royal Bath
2024	Summer 1954	Miss Meacham	Theatre Royal Bath Productions
2026	Present Laughter	Lady Saltburn	Theatre Royal Bath Productions / national tour

== Radio and voice work ==
Year	Title	Role	Notes
2000	Peril at End House	Mildred Croft	
2000	Dogged Persistence	Nettie	Written by Martyn Wade and co-starring Joan Sims and Elizabeth Spriggs (BBC Radio 4, August 2000)
2002	Clock Tower 3	Dorothy Rand	
2002	The Further Adventures of Sherlock Holmes	Mrs Terriss	
2005	No Commitments	Lady Dorothy Trumpington-Bonnet	Episode: "Hard Times" (series eleven, episode four)
2011	Doctor Who: The Eighth Doctor Adventures	Gliss	Episode: "Prisoner of the Sun"
2016	Doctor Who: The Third Doctor Adventures	Mother Finsey	Audio drama series
2017	Doctor Who: The Early Adventures	Professor Blavatsky	Audio drama series
2017	Graceless	Triangle	Audio drama series
2018	Doctor Who: The Monthly Adventures	Lady Crozion	Audio drama series
2019	The Diary of River Song	Darial / Admiral	Audio drama series
2019	Survivors	Meg Pritchard	Audio drama series
2021	The Worlds of Blake's 7	Shar	Audio drama series
2023–2024	Doctor Who: The Seventh Doctor Adventures	Mother Finsey	Audio drama series
