= Martin McCallum =

British theatrical producer (1950–2024)

Martin McCallum (6 April 1950 – 14 January 2024) was a British theatrical producer and President of the Society of London Theatre. Described by The Stage as "a key figure in the British musical theatre boom of the 1980s", he is known for his work with Cameron Mackintosh on original productions such as Cats, Les Misérables, and The Phantom of the Opera.

Having begun his career as a production manager under Laurence Olivier at the National Theatre in the early 1970s, McCallum retained a connection with subsidised theatre throughout his life, as an advisor to the Arts Council, longstanding Chairman of the Donmar Warehouse, and as President of the Society of London Theatre from 1999 to 2002. He worked on over 500 shows, many as an independent producer, on Broadway and in the West End.

== Early career ==
McCallum was born Martin Jeffrey Higgins in Blackpool, Lancashire, the son of Jessie (née Lamb) and Raymond Higgins, a greengrocer. The family moved south, from Manchester to Surrey, where he would begin his theatrical career in 1967, as an assistant stage manager at the Castle Theatre, Farnham. After a number of years in repertory, notably at the Library Theatre, McCallum was hired as a production manager under Laurence Olivier at The Old Vic, then home to the National Theatre.

While at the National, McCallum managed numerous shows, including Michael Blakemore's 1971 production of Long Day's Journey into Night, starring Olivier and Constance Cummings, and the original production of Harold Pinter's No Man's Land, with John Gielgud and Ralph Richardson. In 1976, he was threatened at gun point for breaking strike in order to remove the set of No Man's Land to Canada and proceed touring. After Olivier's departure and the appointment of Peter Hall as director, McCallum remained at the National Theatre, assisting with its relocation to London's South Bank.

== Musical theatre ==
Leaving the National Theatre in 1978, McCallum established The Production Office, the first technical management and design service of its kind in the West End, along with his former National Theatre colleague Richard Bullimore. The company was soon engaged by impresario Robert Stigwood to bring shows such as Franco Zeffirelli's Filumena, Harold Prince's Evita, and Andrew Lloyd Webber's Jesus Christ Superstar to the international stage.

In 1981, McCallum began a 22-year business partnership with Cameron Mackintosh, serving as his Managing Director and later Vice Chairman until 2003. During this time, he oversaw the original productions and international roll-out of various shows, including Cats, Les Misérables, The Phantom of the Opera, and Miss Saigon, across Europe, Asia, and North America. Acknowledged upon his departure as "the managerial genius behind the hugely successful Cameron Mackintosh organisation", McCallum is often credited with pioneering the operational structures for managing and financing major international theatrical productions.

== Society of London Theatre ==
From 1992 to 2003, McCallum served as Chairman of the Donmar Warehouse, a period in which both Sam Mendes and Michael Grandage were appointed as artistic directors. As Chairman, his support of subsidised theatre led to the commission of Tony Travers' Wyndham Report in 1998, the first major study of the economic impact of the West End theatre industry. The following year, McCallum was made President of the Society of London Theatre.

McCallum's presidency was marked by a commitment to youth access and by the inauguration of the joint Theatre Conference in 2001, exploring the future of London's theatrical buildings and spaces. In the wake of the September 11 attacks, he would collaborate with Mayor Ken Livingstone in the campaign to revitalise London's commercial centre, and was later appointed to London's Cultural Strategy Group (2003-2005), tasked with developing strategic policy in regard to culture, arts, and heritage in the capital city. From 1999 to 2003, McCallum sat on Arts Council England’s Drama Panel, serving as a member of its Advisory Task Group until 2005.

== Theatre design ==
Regarded for his work in theatre design, McCallum oversaw the restoration of London's Prince Edward and Prince of Wales theatres, with the former described by Michael Coveney as "a masterpiece of renovation, and one of the great new houses for musical theatre in London". Consulting on similar projects in North America, Germany, South Africa, and Australia, he was closely involved in the restoration of the Auditorium Theatre in Chicago, USA.

== Later career ==
After 2003, McCallum worked mainly as an independent producer, on shows including Matthew Bourne's Edward Scissorhands, winner of a 2007 Drama Desk Award, and Martin McDonagh's The Cripple of Inishmaan, nominated for six Tony Awards in 2014. McCallum served on the board of the Sydney Theatre Company from 2005 to 2015 and, as a member of the STC Chair’s Council, oversaw planning for the renovation of its Wharf Theatre in 2018. He died in Sydney on 14 January 2024, at the age of 73.
