= Matthew Bourne =

British choreographer

Sir Matthew Bourne OBE
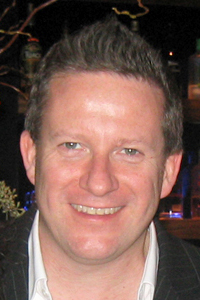
- Born: 13 January 1960 (age 66); Hackney, London
- Citizenship: United Kingdom
- Education: Laban Centre
- Occupations: Theatre director; Choreographer; Dancer
- Years active: 1985–present
- Organization: New Adventures (dance company)
- Notable work: Swan Lake (Bourne); Edward Scissorhands (dance); The Car Man (Bourne); Dorian Gray (Bourne); The Red Shoes (ballet)
- Television: The Nutcracker 1992
- Awards: Laurence Olivier Award for Best New Dance Production 1996; 1999 Drama Desk Award for Outstanding Director - Swan Lake; 1999 Drama Desk Award for Outstanding Choreography – Swan Lake; 2001 Officer of the Order of the British Empire (OBE) for Services to Dance; 2002 Laurence Olivier Award - for My Fair Lady (2001 London revival); 2007 Drama Desk Award for Unique Theatrical Experience - Edward Scissorhands
- Honours: Officer of the Order of the British Empire (OBE) - 2001 for Services to Dance; Knighthood for Services To Dance - 2016
- Website: new-adventures.net

Sir Matthew Christopher Bourne OBE (born 13 January 1960) is a British choreographer. His productions contain many classic cinema and popular culture references and draw thematic inspiration from musicals, film noir and popular culture.

Popular novels and films usually form the basis for his work but Bourne's dance adaptations are sui generis, distinct from their originals. For example, his 1995 restaging of Tchaikovsky's Swan Lake updated the ballet's setting, narrative and famously used all-male swans.

Workshops, collaboration and the inevitable dialogue with the original works inform many of his adaption's choreographical routines and thematic concepts. For his 1997 reimagining of Cinderella, Bourne invoked the Victorian and Edwardian eras by disseminating certain books and novels from those time periods amongst the production's cast members.

His New Adventures dance company's work covers ballet, contemporary dance, dance theatre and musical theatre.

His adaptations of Sleeping Beauty, Edward Scissorhands, The Red Shoes, Dorian Gray, and Lord of the Flies added new dimensions to these near-ubiquitous stories. Bourne's recent work, The Midnight Bell, sets Patrick Hamilton's 1929 novel in a pub, and Bourne's Romeo and Juliet put the tragedy's mental health and youth suicide themes centre stage.

In 2016, he was knighted as part of Queen Elizabeth II 2016 New Year Honours list for 'Services to Dance'.

== Early life and influences ==
Bourne was born on January 13, 1960, in Hackney, London, England. His mother was a secretary and his father worked for Thames Water. Bourne had no formal ballet training during his childhood. However, as a teenager, he was passionate about show business. He would frequently autograph hunt in London's West End after his mother took him to see Dame Edith Evans and Friends in 1974 at the Theatre Royal Haymarket. He wrote to and received letters back from Joan Crawford, Charlie Chaplin and Bette Davis. He was eighteen when he attended Sadler's Wells Theatre to see his first ballet, Swan Lake.

He worked as a filing clerk at the BBC and as an usher at The National Theatre for four years after graduating from William Fitt and Sir George Monoux School in Walthamstow, London. At 20 he started studying at London's Laban Centre and began dance classes at 22. In 1985, he toured for two years with the centre's dance company. However, his interests gradually shifted from dancing to choreographing for television, theatre, and other dance companies. He completed a BA honours degree in contemporary dance in 1985. And in 1986, he graduated with an MA in dance performance. He co-founded the London-based company Adventures in Motion Pictures (AMP) in 1987. Bourne's radical reinterpretations of classic ballets set him apart as a choreographer. In 1992, he placed the Christmas Eve scene of Pyotr Ilyich Tchaikovsky's The Nutcracker in a Victorian orphanage reminiscent of a Charles Dickens novel. His 1994 version of Filippo Taglioni's La Sylphide titled Highland Fling, was set in a modern-day Glaswegian housing project. Highland Fling was also the beginning of Bourne's creative alliance with the designer Lez Brotherston.

== Style and process ==
Bourne's work primarily concerns clarity of exposition, characterisation, technical staging and cinematic devices. Thematically, his work draws on Metro-Goldwyn-Mayer musicals, film noir and Alfred Hitchcock, among others. Bourne's career trajectory shifted after his time at the Laban Centre, where he honed his signature theatrical style. His work stood in contrast to the more provocative dance styles of the 1980s, associated with artists such as Michael Clark and Lloyd Newson's DV8 Physical Theatre. Instead, Bourne's style centred on romance, wit, and tangible drama, as demonstrated in his adaptation of Swan Lake.

Bourne's New Adventure's troupe consists of both ballet and modern dancers who perform intricate choreography that stems from the character's actions and movements.

Bourne's works often convert written works into physical, visual, and musical forms, initiating a dialogue between the adaptation and the original work by actively emphasising the relationship between the two. Moreover, because his work uses many classic cinema and popular culture references, its impact largely depends on the viewer's relationship to the original work.

=== Process ===
Since the start of his career, Bourne's approach has involved a collaborative process with his dancers and creative-partners. In 2007, Sam Archer and Richard Winsor, portraying Edward in the initial Edward Scissorhands performances, confirmed that Bourne still uses this approach; where in a piece's embryonic stage, Bourne assigns the dancers tasks like creating individual dance steps that eventually form part of the choreography.

== Notable works ==
=== Nutcracker! ===
In Bourne's Nutcracker!, a dance adaptation of Pyotr Ilyich Tchaikovsky's The Nutcracker first staged in 1992, Clara inhabits a black-and-white orphanage under the rule of a stern matron and Dr. Dross. Somehow, Clara's Nutcracker doll transforms into a young man who leads her on a journey to Sweetieland, a fictional location where sweets and confectionery represent pleasure and desire. In this world, earlier characters reappear as sweets in a visually striking setting created by Anthony Ward, combining elements of the graphic novel with surreal, vibrant colors.

Bourne's Nutcracker! blends ballet, folk dance and mime in elaborately choreographed movements. The performance references the Norwegian figure skater Sonja Henie and Les Patineurs to form a tableau reminiscent of The Nutcracker's original choreographers, Marius Petipa and Lev Ivanov.

=== Swan Lake ===
In 1995, AMP premiered Bourne's restaging of Tchaikovsky's Swan Lake. In his updated version, he placed the prince in a contemporary dysfunctional family and had him fall in love with a male swan. Drawing inspiration from Tchaikovsky's music and nature, Bourne portrayed swans as large, aggressive, and powerful creatures, danced by bare-chested men wearing knee-length shorts made of shredded silk resembling feathers. This was a significant departure from the traditional portrayal of swans by young women in romantic white costumes. Swan Lake won the 1996 Laurence Olivier Award for best new dance production, and the production won 1999's 53rd Tony Awards for direction and choreography after it opened on Broadway in 1998. The ballet toured internationally multiple times in the early 21st century.

=== Cinderella ===
Bourne's reinterpretation of this classic fairytale is set in wartime London. Premiered at the Piccadilly Theatre, London in September 1997. Bourne provided his dancers with books and films about Cinderella and the Victorian and Edwardian eras that influenced his version. Bourne's research into previous interpretations and historical contexts contributed to a historically informed performance. Bourne favoured the 1977 Royal Ballet version, appreciating its drama and narrative pace, despite its longer duration.

=== The Car Man ===
Bourne's dance interpretation of Georges Bizet's Carmen titled The Car Man, premiered at The Royal Albert Hall in 2000.

The narrative revolves around Luca, a drifter who finds himself in a love triangle with Lana, the wife of a local garage owner, and Angelo, a young man grappling with his identity in the town's hypermasculine environment. Typical of Bourne productions, the production blends genres, dotting film, ballet, and musical references amongst its retro visual designs.

Larger productions use a flexible multi-tier set construction incorporating a live orchestra and billboard screens, allowing for a seamless transition between scenes and creating a thrust stage.

The production's soundtrack merges compositions from Rodion Shchedrin's Carmen Suite with sound effects, thus functioning as both an orchestral score and a cinematic soundtrack. This blend of audio elements contributes to the atmosphere and progression of the narrative.

The Car Man's most recent cast includes Zizi Strallen as Lana, Will Bozier as Luca, and Paris Fitzpatrick as Angelo. The choreography is deeply integrated into the storytelling, with initial group numbers establishing the setting, before individual interactions become the narrative's driving force. Notably, the carnal encounters between Luca, Lana, and Angelo, choreographed with great intensity and physicality, propel the story forward.

In the spirit of classic melodrama, the narrative threads of lust, deceit, and violence intertwine, leading to a second act dominated by themes of guilt and revenge. The production's duality mirrors the character of Luca, who compellingly embodies multiple aspects of the narrative's nuanced exploration of desire and identity.

=== Play Without Words ===
Play Without Words debuted in 2002 as part of the National Theatre's Transformation season, aimed at attracting a younger audience. The production, a dance work, drew inspiration from 1960s British new wave cinema. It featured an atmospheric jazz score by Terry Davies and was largely influenced by Joseph Losey's 1963 film The Servant. This film, scripted by Harold Pinter, explored class and power dynamics through the story of a young upper-class man who hires a Cockney valet to manage his townhouse, a relationship that implodes due to the valet's manipulation.

Bourne's unique approach involved casting each character multiple times, concurrently revealing different and sometimes contradictory aspects of their personalities. This technique created an environment where reality and fantasy coexisted, resulting in a narrative reminiscent of Nicolas Roeg's work in Performance.

The plotline follows Prentice, the manservant, as he caters to his employer, Anthony's needs while simultaneously scheming his downfall. Bourne's choreography intensifies during these scenes, highlighting the characters' dynamic interactions.

Certain scenes highlight the ambiguous relationships between the characters. For instance, Prentice's friend Speight seduces Anthony's neglected fiancée, Glenda, though his actions hint at more complex motivations. Speight is presented as an embodiment of an evolving, sexually egalitarian future.

Bourne's Play Without Words' pessimistic tone was a stark contrast to the Cultural Olympiad's more optimistic works. The production encouraged audience immersion and encouraged audience members to dress in attire inspired by the 1960s British cinema.

=== Edward Scissorhands ===
Bourne's Edward dance adaptation of Tim Burton's film debuted in 2005. The story follows the tale of a boy with scissors for hands created by an inventor in a gothic workshop. The boy, Edward, played by Dominic North, is welcomed into 1950s suburban America in a fictional town called Hope Springs. Bourne subtly caricatured the social life and mannerisms of the time realised through Lez Brotherston's costumes and stage designs.

The protagonist's dance movement arc progresses from a robotic goofiness akin to pantomime to confidence as his suburban community accepts him. But finally descends into theatrical despair after Kim and the town's community reject him.

The production's highlights included Edward's dream, where momentarily free of his scissor hands, he performs a duet with Kim flanked by dancers dressed as Edward's topiary art. Terry Davies based the score on themes from the movie score by Danny Elfman.

=== Dorian Gray ===
Bourne's adaptation of Oscar Wilde's The Picture of Dorian Gray in 2008 highlights the combination of celebrity and youth that lead to Wilde's protagonist's downfall.

Bourne's concept originated from a male duet workshop titled Romeo and Romeo. The dancers' contributions and the choreographical ideas that emerged from the workshop, with some minor changes, formed the final production of Dorian Gray. Therefore, in the performance's original programme, Bourne credited both himself and his company for the production's choreography. Richard Winsor, who played Dorian, and Jason Piper, who portrayed Basil Hallward in the ballet's second iteration, both participated in the Romeo & Romeo workshop.

Moreover, he began to refine Wilde's narrative's intricate plot and themes during conversations with long-term collaborator Lez Brotherston. Bourne attests that their adaptation preserves most of Wilde's original work, particularly the novel's central theme of a handsome young man's internal corruption.

The desire to modernise the narrative raised several discussions about which time period might work best for their reimaging. Initially, they considered setting their adaptation in the 1960s because both Bourne and Brotherston often revisit this period in their work. However, they decided to set their rendering in the present. Later, Bourne admitted the piece's contemporary setting brought an element of apprehension.

In his adaptation of The Picture of Dorian Gray, Bourne changes Sybil Vane to a male ballet dancer called Cyril and he rewrites Lord Henry as a female magazine editor who wields considerable power.

The plotline of Bourne's Dorian Grey also differs slightly from Wilde's. In Bourne's adaptation, the portrait reflecting the protagonist's inner state, transforms into Dorian's doppelgänger. Dorian's doppelgänger incrementally poses a threat to Dorian's position as a figure of public and private adoration. Ultimately, rather than destroy the painting like he does in Wilde's original, Bourne's contemporary Dorian Grey stabs his doppelgänger in front of the paparazzi.

The Doppelgänger first appears after Dorian's involvement in his lover Cyril's drug overdose. The doppelganger's presence increases thereafter. At several points Dorian scrutinises his own actions by observing the actions of his Doppelgänger from a dissociative state.

In contrast to Wilde's original novel, by introducing a Doppelgänger into the plot bourne reframes the protagonist's conflict as an internal conflict with himself, his nature and his values.

==== Reception ====
The production broke the Edinburgh International Festival's biggest-selling dance event record. Mark Morris set the festival's previous record of 10,146 tickets for his The Hard Nut in 1995. At the time, The Herald reported that Bourne's Dorian Grey sold 11,212 tickets.

Bourne's Dorian Grey and Oscar Wilde's original work faced similar criticism; both Wilde's original and Bourne's adaptation parodied the excess and superficiality of celebrity culture;but some critics still derided the performance's choreography for how it depicted the traits central to its protagonist's narcissism. The challenge of satirising a subject without adopting its criticised traits has featured heavily in the subsequent analysis of Bourne's Dorian Grey.

=== Lord of the Flies ===
Bourne's 2011 adaptation of William Golding's classic illustrates masculinity's savagery-inducing effects in a way that words cannot. Unlike previous Bourne productions. The Theatre Royal approached the Bourne's New Adventures charitable arm, ReBourne, to stage the show with Scottish Arts Council funding and a cast including some young men who had never danced before. The project's goal was to stage a production of Lord of the Flies that drew on the talent pool of the cities where it was shown. Typical of Bourne's adaptations, as director, he chooses to set his Lord of the Flies in a deserted theatre. The boy's reasons for being trapped in a deserted theatre are unclear. Nor is it apparent why this abandoned theatre has a decaying pig's head. But in this new setting, Golding's characters find themselves scavenging for mini ice cream tubs in this new setting.

=== Sleeping Beauty ===
Bourne drew on many sources of inspiration when creating Sleeping Beauty in 2012, as did his dancers for their characters. He read multiple versions of the story, noting commonalities and differences. While he ignored the second half of Perrault's original, he found the Grimm version, titled Little Briar Rose, closer to the well-known story. The Disney animated film also took liberties, such as omitting the 100-year sleep. Bourne incorporated elements from each of these versions into his production. He addressed perceived shortfalls in the original story, crediting Walt Disney for rectifying them in the 1959 animated version. The historical timeframe of Bourne's narrative provided anchor points for movement styles. Aurora's christening is set in 1890, her coming-of-age party in 1911, and her awakening in a modern-day gothic nightmare. The story starts with a childless King and Queen seeking help from the evil fairy Carabosse, who leaves Aurora on the palace's doorstep. The fairies bestow qualities reinforcing her free-spirited nature. Bourne's version encompasses themes of good versus evil, sleep, rebirth, and vampires. Carabosse's son, Caradoc, is introduced to maintain the malign theme, forming a love triangle with Leo. Themes of sleep and rebirth appear in both versions, with one fairy named Hibernia, the Fairy of Rebirth, emphasising this connection.

Bourne's original 2012 cast featured Dominic North as Leo and Hannah Vassallo as Aurora. The score was adapted and supplemented with additional sound effects.

==== 2022 staging ====
In 2022 Bourne's Sleeping Beauty returned to Sadler's Wells Theatre for a seven-week residency.

=== The Red Shoes ===
Bourne's 2016 adaptation of The Red Shoes is based on the iconic Powell and Pressburger film and inspired by the Hans Christian Andersen fairytale of the same name about a pair of red shoes that enhance their owner's dancing abilities but at a cost.

Lez Brotherston designed the set to resemble the grandeur of an opera house. And Terry Davies incorporated Bernard Herrmann's more obscure soundtracks to create an atmospheric score performed by New Adventures' 16-piece orchestra conducted by Brett Morris.

The adaptation premiered in Plymouth on November 21, 2016, starring Ashley Shaw as Victoria Page.

The two-act performance glimpses a theatre's inner workings and the sacrifice required for seamless performances. For example, early in the performance, the spotlight voyeuristically tracks the company's prima ballerina assoluta, Michela Meazza, as she wafts, waves and flutters a La Sylphide-styled tutu's fairy wings emulating the imminent performance's movements.

After its initial run, The Red Shoes toured the UK and internationally.

==== 2019 tour ====
Bourne's company reprised Red Shoes for an International tour at the end of 2019. Adam Cooper returned to New Adventures for the 2019 tour to reprise his erotic, dangerous swan role. However, after a final performance at Wimbledon, the tour ended abruptly due to Covid 19 restrictions on March 14, 2020.

==== Remote staging ====
The cast created a condensed twelve-minute version of The Red Shoes during the 2020 lockdown. They performed in various home settings, including living rooms, gardens, and kitchens. This version's performers wore casual attire like football kits, homemade outfits, and towels.

=== Romeo and Juliet ===
Renderings of William Shakespeare's tragedy about teen suicide typically highlight the family feud as the reason for the protagonist's joint suicide while ignoring their death's most probable explanation; two young people forcibly separated at a difficult point in their lives. During rehearsals Bourne repeatedly rewrote Shakespeare's plot and scenario, eventually settling for a gender-segregated institution akin to a psychiatric hospital. It isn't clear exactly what type of institution it is, but Bourne speculated that it could be, “A borstal, a prison, a school, something to do with mental health? An excess of feeling is frowned upon – there may be young people who have too much feeling.” What is clear are the physical and sexual power structures binding this institution. For example, Tybalt, a prison guard, sexually assaults Juliet and the ballet's choreography uses rigidly synchronised motions to underscore its character's incarceration. Brotherston's set consists of an austere white-tile-clad stage flanked by doors, a balcony, staircases and circled by white fencing. First staged in 2019, Cordelia Braithwaite portrays Juliet as an intense red-haired girl. While the twitchy, troubled Romeo is there because his mother and father wish to disassociate themselves from their embarrassing son. Like the Kenneth MacMillan version before it, a homoerotic bond between Romeo, Mercutio, Benvolio, and Balthasar is also present in Bourne's version.

=== The Midnight Bell ===
Bourne's The Midnight Bell is an adaptation of Patrick Hamilton's 1929 novel The Midnight Bell, which is not to be confused with Francis Lathom's gothic novel of the same name. Bourne subtitled the piece Intoxicated Tales from Darkest Soho, and set it in a smokey 1930s London pub called The Midnight Bell. The narrative centres on ten of Hamilton's original characters' intertwined lives. The performance introduces its characters through their professions or societal roles. They are primarily individuals seeking social connection and solace from their circumstances in their local pub. The two acts depict the character's personal struggles, dreams, and the evolution of their relationships over one month. The piece's most notable character arcs and performances were Bryony Wood's portrayal of a young prostitute, Michela Meazza's depiction of Miss Roach, the lonesome spinster and George Harvey Bone, the deranged killer played by Richard Winsor.

== Career ==
Matthew Bourne is best known for his unique re-imaginings of traditional ballet, such as his 1995 production of Swan Lake, where he replaced the traditionally female corps-de-ballet with a male ensemble. Swan Lake (Bourne) went on to be the longest-running ballet in London's West End and New York City's Broadway. The production earned him the title as the only British director to win both 'Best Choreographer' and 'Best Director' in the same year at the 1999 Tony Awards. On the iconic appeal of Swan Lake at the time, The New Yorker said, 'what was important about the gender switch was that it made this old love story romantic again, by making it seem dangerous.'

His admirers say that he has 'broadened the definition of ballet in a way that has consistently appealed to young audiences'.

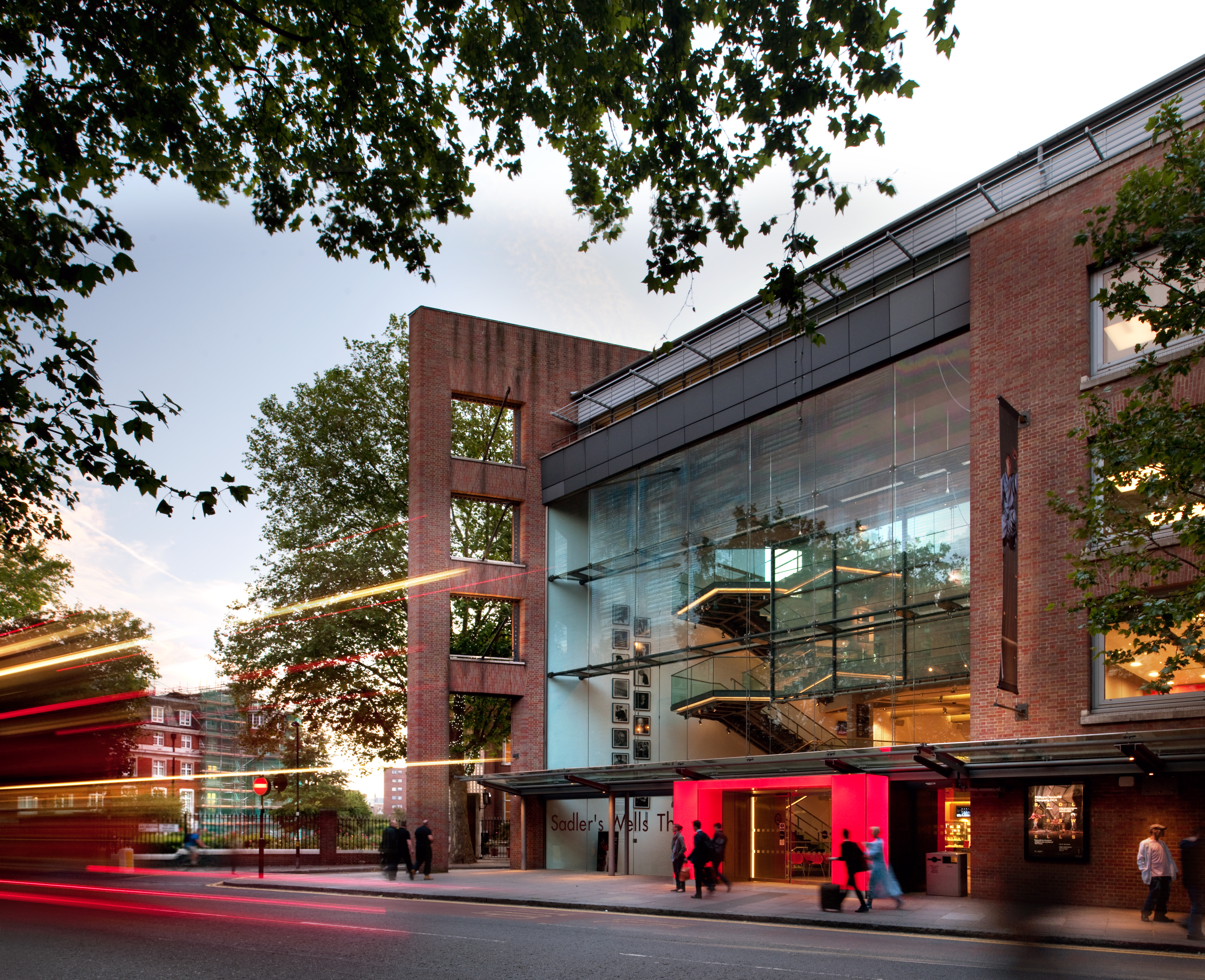
Sadler's Wells Theatre

Since 1986, Bourne has worked in dance, musical theatre and film with his dance companies New Adventures and AMP, as well as choreographed musicals for West End Theatre such as Mary Poppins and My Fair Lady. Productions include The Red Shoes (ballet), The Car Man (Bourne) (based on Bizet's Carmen) and Edward Scissorhands (dance) among many others. The company has reimagined many traditional Tchaikovsky ballets, such as The Nutcracker and Sleeping Beauty, placing them in a new, cinematic context to enliven their potential for storytelling for a modern audience. Bourne has also adapted famous cinema and literature for the stage, such as a dance version of Tim Burton's 1990 film Edward Scissorhands, Hans Christian Andersen and Pressburger's The Red Shoes (1948 film) and Wilde's The Picture of Dorian Gray.

Bourne is described after an interview with the New Yorker in 2007 as a particularly 'audience-conscious artist'. Bourne highlights the importance of intervals for the audience, "in the second half they're always more demonstrative, because they've talked to their friends and decided that it's O.K. to enjoy it." He also explains how he always asks company dancers to offer warmth in their curtain calls, saying, "I pride myself on my company's curtain calls, I really do. I think you won't see a nicer curtain call than from my lot."

=== New Adventures ===
A group of Laban graduates established the company, formerly known as 'Adventures in Motion Pictures' in 1987. After the success of Swan Lake, AMP (Adventures in Motion Pictures) was heading down a highly commercial route. Long-running international tours of Swan Lake meant the company felt headed for world domination, which made Bourne uneasy, "I felt that I was running an office rather than a company". The pressure to create highly profitable productions left Bourne feeling creatively stifled. Feeling the need to be closer to his productions and seeking room to experiment and work with a smaller team, Bourne and AMP's co-director Katherine Doré eventually made the decision to split.

In 2000, he started a new company, New Adventures, which was officially formed with Managing Director Robert Noble OBE (also Deputy Managing Director of Cameron Mackintosh) and Bourne's long time collaborator, and former dancer, Etta Murfitt MBE as Associate Artistic Director. This enabled Bourne and the company to scale down and create low budget shows, working in close collaboration with the dancers and artists who contribute hugely to his creative process. Esteemed dance critic Judith Mackrell notes, 'there were moments in his career when Bourne could easily have let himself become a commercial commodity and squandered his talent.

Its notable members include the Canadian dancer and critic Lynn Seymour. Often described as "one of the greatest dramatic ballerinas of the 20th century", Seymour, reportedly took a liking to Bourne's adaptation of Swan Lake and asked Bourne if she could play the part of Queen. The following year Seymour played a Bette Davis-inspired Stepmother in Bourne's adaptation of Sergei Prokofiev's Cinderella. And reprised the stepmother role in Bourne's 2017 version.

== Personal life ==
Bourne started his dance training at the relatively late age of 22, and trained at Trinity Laban in London. Before that he describes himself as self-taught, saying "my first ever dance class was my audition for dance college when I was 21".

As a teenager he would take the bus to the West End to collect autographs. Bourne attended the London Gay Teenage Group in Holloway, North London. He spoke about this on the Jo Whiley show on BBC Radio 2 in 2018.

As of 2015 Bourne is in a long-term relationship with contemporary dance choreographer Arthur Pita, who has been described as the "David Lynch of dance". Pita says of their relationship, "we talk about work a lot, but it's never competitive, our styles are so different". The two met through Bourne's production of Swan Lake, when Bourne was director and Arthur was a swan.

In addition to his 2016 knighthood, Bourne has received multiple awards and award nominations, including the Laurence Olivier Award, Tony Award, and Drama Desk Award, and has also received several honorary doctorates of arts from UK universities.

== Stage productions ==
Stage Productions
Spitfire – 1988	The Infernal Galop – 1989	Town & Country	Watch with Mother – 1991	
Deadly Serious – 1992	Percy of Fitzrovia – 1992	Nutcracker! - 1992	Highland Fling – 1994	
Swan Lake – 1995	Cinderella – 1997	The Car Man – 2000	Play Without Words – 2002	
Edward Scissorhands – 2005	Dorian Gray – 2008	Lord of the Flies – 2011	Early Adventures – 2012	
Sleeping Beauty – 2012	The Red Shoes – 2016	Romeo and Juliet – 2019	The Midnight Bell – 2021	Oliver (Musical) – 2025

Film & TV
Drip: A Narcissistic Love Story – 1993 BBC TV	Late Flowering Lust – 1993 BBC TV	Swan Lake – 1995, 2011 & 2019	Nutcracker! – 2001 & 2022
Matthew Bourne's Christmas – 2012 Channel 4	The Car Man 2001 & 2015	Sleeping Beauty – 2013	Cinderella – 2017

== Awards and nominations ==
Awards
1996 Time Out Special Award	1996 Southbank Show Award	1996 Laurence Olivier Award for Best New Dance Production - Swan Lake	1997 Honorary Fellow - The Laban Centre
1999 Astaire Award - Special Award for Direction, Choreography and Concept of Swan Lake	1999 Drama Desk Award Director of a Musical – Swan Lake	1999 Drama Desk Award for Outstanding Choreography – Swan Lake	1999 Tony Award Best Choreography – Swan Lake
1999 Tony Award Best Direction of a Musical – Swan Lake	2000 Evening Standard Award for Musical Event – The Car Man	2001 Officer of the Order of the British Empire (OBE) for Services to Dance	2003 Hamburg Shakespeare Prize of the Alfred Toepfer Foundation
2003 Laurence Olivier Award for Best Theatre Choreographer - Play Without Words	2005 Laurence Olivier Award for Best Original Choreography – Mary Poppins	2007 Drama Desk Award Unique Theatrical Experience – Edward Scissorhands	2007 Theatre Managers Special Award (TMA) for Individual Achievement - For services to Dance Touring and Audience Development
2007 Honorary Doctor of Arts from De Montfort University, Leicester	2010 Honorary Doctor of Arts from Plymouth University	2010 The British Inspiration Award - Winner in Arts Category	2011 Honorary Doctorate - Kingston University
2011 Honorary Doctorate - Roehampton University	2011 Companion - Trinity Laban Conservatoire of Music and Dance	2012 LIPA Companion (Liverpool Institute of Performing Arts) Presented by Sir Paul McCartney	2013 De Valois Award for Outstanding Achievement - National Dance Awards
2013 Dance Film Association 'Dance in Focus' Award - given for 'persistence of vision, drive and artistry'	2014 The Sir George Monoux Founders Award - Presented at the Dedication Ceremony of The Matthew Bourne Theatre, Monoux College, Walthamstow, London	2015 Primio Ravenna Festival - Ravenna Festival Highest Honour	2015 The UK Theatre Award for Outstanding Contribution to British Theatre
2016 Knighthood for Services To Dance - New Years Honours	2016 Queen Elizabeth II Coronation (QEII) Award in recognition of outstanding services to the art of ballet	2016 Honorary Doctorate of Arts - Royal Conservatoire of Scotland	2016 The Gene Kelly Legacy Award from Dizzy Feet Foundation
2016 Critics’ Circle Distinguished Service to Art Award	2017 Trailblazer in Dance and Theatre Award from The International Institute of Dance and Theatre	2017 Olivier Award for Best Theatre Choreographer - The Red Shoes	2019 Special Olivier Award in recognition of his extraordinary achievements in dance
2020 Laurence Olivier Award for Best Theatre Choreographer - Mary Poppins	2021 Best Modern Choreography for The Midnight Bell at National Dance Awards		

Nominations
2010 Laurence Olivier Award for Best Theatre Choreography – Oliver!	2000 Laurence Olivier Award for Outstanding Achievement in Dance – The Car Man	2005 Drama Desk Award Outstanding Director of a Musical – Play Without Words	2005 Drama Desk Award Outstanding Choreography – Play Without Words
2007 Drama Desk Award Outstanding Choreography – Edward Scissorhands	2007 Drama Desk Award Outstanding Choreography – Mary Poppins	2007 Tony Award Best Choreography – Mary Poppins	2017 Best Modern Choreography for The Red Shoes - National Dance Awards 2017
