= National Dance Awards 2001 =

The National Dance Awards 2001, were organised and presented by The Critics' Circle, and were awarded to recognise excellence in professional dance in the United Kingdom. The ceremony was held at the Royal Opera House, London, on 12 January 2002, with awards given for productions staged in the previous year.

== Awards Presented ==
- De Valois Award for Outstanding Achievement in Dance - Anthony Dowell, formerly Artistic Director, Royal Ballet
- Best Male Dancer - Johan Kobborg
- Best Female Dancer - Tamara Rojo
- Outstanding Young Male Artist - Edward Watson
- Outstanding Young Female Artist - Erina Takahashi
- Best Foreign Dance Company - Kirov Ballet from Russia
- Best Choreography - Christopher Wheeldon for Polyphonia
