= The Red Shoes (ballet) =

Ballet adaptation

- Choreographer: Matthew Bourne
- Music: Bernard Herrman
- Based on: The 1948 film by Michael Powell and Emeric Pressburger and the 1845 fairy tale by Hans Christian Andersen
- Premiere: November 21, 2016; Theatre Royal, Plymouth
- Original ballet company: New Adventures

The Red Shoes is a ballet choreographed by Matthew Bourne using the music of Bernard Herrmann (1911–1975). It is based broadly on the 1948 film The Red Shoes by Michael Powell and Emeric Pressburger. The set and costume designs are by Lez Brotherston. The ballet was premiered on 21 November 2016 at the Theatre Royal, Plymouth by Bourne's ballet company, New Adventures.

== Background ==
Bourne has said that "the image of the red shoes that, once put on, will not allow the wearer to stop dancing has long been a potent one for creative minds, from Powell and Pressburger to Kate Bush to Emma Rice... I have loved the film since I was a teenager...My challenge has been to capture some of that surreal, sensuous quality [of the film] within the more natural theatre setting."

The production uses music written by Herrmann from a variety of his film scores, including those for The Ghost and Mrs. Muir, Fahrenheit 451, Hangover Square, and Citizen Kane. It does not include any of the music written by Brian Easdale for the original 1948 film score. Herrmann's music was reorchestrated for the ballet by Terry Davies for an ensemble of strings, pianos, harp, percussion and electronic keyboards. Brotherston's designs include the use of a stage set proscenium arch which can rotate to indicate whether the theatre-based scenes are taking place on-stage or off-stage.

== Synopsis ==
The ballet is set in London, Monte Carlo and Villefranche-sur-Mer in the period of the late 1940s to early 1950s. The ballerina Victoria Page is talent-spotted by the ballet impresario Boris Lermontov, who is based in Monte Carlo. He commissions the composer Julian Craster to compose a ballet based on Hans Christian Andersen's tale, The Red Shoes. Victoria takes the lead in the ballet, and she and Craster fall in love. Victoria has to choose between her love and her career. Having returned to London to be with Craster, she ekes out a career dancing in a music hall. The chance of dancing for Lermontov again lures her to return to his ballet company to dance once more in The Red Shoes. Craster pursues her to persuade her to return to him. In her confusion and indecision, fleeing from Lermontov she falls beneath an oncoming train and is killed.

== Production history ==
The ballet made its world premiere at the Theatre Royal, Plymouth on 21 November 2016, prior to an eight-week Christmas season at the Sadler's Wells Theatre in London before embarking on a UK tour.

The ballet made its US premiere at the Ahmanson Theatre, Los Angeles on 15 September 2017 before playing seasons at The Kennedy Center in Washington DC, Blumenthal Performing Arts in Charlotte, and City Center, New York.

The ballet returned to Sadler's Wells Theatre for the 2019 and 2025 Christmas seasons before embarking on another UK tour.

== Reception ==
Critical response to the premiere was positive. The Observer reported that it was "a feast for the eye, with every scene animated by sharp detail and witty characterisation...It’s all very artfully composed, and Bourne choreographs with the lightest of touches, threading in references to Hollywood movies and Diaghilev-era ballets as he goes." The Stage commented that "This is fine work. If one or two of the events and relationships are too fleeting to register they will develop over time. And time is what Bourne has because like all hand-crafted footwear, The Red Shoes is built to last....[it] is Matthew Bourne's finest achievement to date."

For his work on The Red Shoes, Bourne won the award of Best Theatre Choreographer and the show itself won Best Entertainment at the 2017 Olivier Awards.

== See also ==
- "The Red Shoes", 1845 fairy tale by Hans Christian Andersen
