= Swan Lake (Bourne) =

Ballet choreographed by Matthew Bourne

Matthew Bourne's Swan Lake
- Choreographer: Matthew Bourne
- Music: Pyotr Ilyich Tchaikovsky
- Premiere: 9 November 1995
- Original ballet company: New Adventures
- Website: new-adventures.net/swan-lake

Matthew Bourne's Swan Lake is a contemporary ballet based on the Russian romantic work Swan Lake, from which it takes the music by Tchaikovsky and the broad outline of the plot. The ballet centres on a prince who feels trapped by his duties and emotionally neglected by his distant mother. At the peak of his despair, he meets a swan that embodies his desire for freedom and love. Bourne's interpretation is best known for having the traditionally female parts of the swans danced by men.

Produced by Adventures in Motion Pictures with Bourne as director and choreographer, the original ballet premiered in London at Sadler's Wells Theatre on 9 November 1995 and ran until 25 November. The original cast included Scott Ambler as the Prince, Adam Cooper as the Swan and the Stranger, Emily Piercy as the Prince's Girlfriend, and Fiona Chadwick as the Queen. The production received widespread critical acclaim and commercial success, and received the 1996 Olivier award for Best New Dance Production.

The ballet has found significant popularity and commercial success worldwide, with Bourne's choice to use male swans hailed as radical and daring. As of 2026, it is the longest-running ballet in London's West End and on Broadway. It has been performed in the UK, the USA, Europe, Russia, Australia, South Korea, Japan, Israel, China and Singapore.

To date, there have been three filmed stage productions, with the 1998 film featuring the original cast.

== Inception and development ==
Matthew Bourne had previously adapted The Nutcracker and La Sylphide to contemporary ballet. In 1995, his company Adventures in Motion Pictures had six dancers, and required an increase to thirty-two dancers to produce Swan Lake. Bourne invited Royal Ballet principals Adam Cooper and Fiona Chadwick to play the Swan/the Stranger and the Queen respectively. Lez Brotherston, a set and costume designer with a history of collaboration with Bourne, designed the iconic swan costumes.

== Synopsis ==
This synopsis is derived from programme notes and the synopsis provided on the DVD. The plot of the ballet revolves around a young crown prince, his distant mother, his desire for freedom and his love portrayed as a swan who has been cursed by an evil sorcerer von Rothbart.

=== Act I ===
In the prologue, the Prince, as a child, is awakened by a nightmare of a swan. The Prince's mother enters to comfort him, but leaves after becoming nervous by the situation's intimacy.

Scene 1 opens with the Prince being prepared for a day of official duties by chambermaids and valets.

In Scene 2, arrayed in his full dress uniform, the Prince becomes bored by a boat christening, a ribbon cutting, and other official tasks. His mother prods him to keep up appearances, even as she devotes more attention to the soldiers than she does to him. During this scene, there is a transition from the child actor playing the young Prince to the identically-dressed adult dancer who portrays the grown Prince. This now-adult Prince is introduced to a girl called "the Girlfriend". Although the girl seems foisted on him by von Rothbart, the Private Secretary, (Note: Named as such in the DVD synopsis, thus identifying him with the sorcerer in the original scenario.) the Prince prefers her to his duty-bound life.

In Scene 3, the Queen, one of her admiring soldiers, the Private Secretary, the Prince, and the Girlfriend all appear in a theatre box, where they watch a ballet that is staged for the actual audience as well as for the characters. The ballet's backdrop (from a design for Castle Falkenstein by Christian Jank), ornate costumes, and acting parody the romantic ballets of which the original Swan Lake was an example. The Girlfriend's responses to the dance as well as her eventual dropping her purse from the royal box annoy the Queen and von Rothbart.

Scene 4 finds the Prince drinking in his private chambers in front of a mirror, to his mother's shock. A nearly violent pas de deux ensues in which he pleads for her attention and love, while she rebukes him.

The Prince then goes into the streets and into the Swank Bar, a 1970s-style disco, in Scenes Five and Six. Here is where the choreography veers from classical ballet, with jazz forms and modern dance dominating. The Prince gets into a fight with sailors at the bar, and he is thrown out into the street. In Scene Seven, he sees the Girlfriend being paid off by von Rothbart, and he is totally shattered to discover that the only person who appeared to love him is a fake. This increases his desperation and he vows to kill himself.

While sitting in the street at the end of Scene Seven the Prince imagines a group of swans flying towards him but the vision disappears. It is the first flash of the Prince's descent into mental turmoil.

=== Act II ===
Distraught and disappointed that he will never find affection, the Prince writes a suicide note and goes to throw himself into a lake at a public park inhabited by swans. He is saved by a vision in which he encounters the lead Swan, who had appeared to him in his dreams. Initially rejected by the lead Swan, the Prince is gradually accepted and taken into the Swan's arms. The prince and lead swan fall in love. The Prince is elated and abandons his plan to kill himself. This Act contains the most talked-about element of the ballet in which bare-chested, barefoot male dancers play the swans, and it contains a very sensual pas de deux between the lead Swan and the Prince.

=== Act III ===
Scene 1 begins with princesses from various European nations and their escorts arriving at the palace gates for a grand ball. The Girlfriend sneaks in amongst them.

Scene 2 takes place in a ballroom. It commences with the arrival of the Queen and the Prince and some formal dancing, but quickly degenerates into a debauched party of drinking and lascivious come-ons. Into this arrives the charismatic and sexually aggressive son of von Rothbart, (Note: Also named in the DVD synopsis.) the Stranger, in black leather trousers, who intensifies the sexual tension even further by flirting with every woman present, including the Queen. Each woman finds herself drawn to him and actively participates in the mutual, sometimes lewd, flirtation.

Just as in the original Swan Lake, where customarily (although not always) one ballerina performs the roles of both the white swan (Odette) and the black swan (Odile), the same ballet dancer performs the white Swan and the black-clad young von Rothbart in this version. The Prince sees something of his beloved Swan in the son, and he is very attracted to his bravado and animal magnetism but shocked by his lewdness, especially towards his mother. During bump and grind group numbers and a sequence of national dances, it becomes clear that the Queen is powerfully attracted to von Rothbart's son. His father, the Private Secretary, looks on with an increasingly triumphant approval. The Prince also tries to approach young von Rothbart, only to be rebuffed. The Prince retreats into his mind and imagines dancing intimately with him, but the Prince's confusion interrupts the fantasy, and the son's movements turn from love to violence.

The Prince imagines the Queen and young von Rothbart flaunting their growing physical affection for each other. They join with the other guests at the ball to laugh and ridicule him because of his growing distress. The Queen and young von Rothbart end their dancing with an embrace and passionate kissing. The Prince, in his fury, violently separates them and is rewarded by outrage from both and a slap from his mother. Overwhelmed by conflicted feelings, the Prince produces a pistol and threatens to shoot his mother. In an ensuing scuffle the Girlfriend tries to dissuade the Prince, while the Private Secretary draws a pistol and points it at the Prince. As shots ring out, the Girlfriend and the Prince fall to the ground, but only the Girlfriend has been hit. She lies unconscious and the Prince is dragged away, while the Queen throws herself into young von Rothbart's arms. He gives the pistol he had taken from the Prince to his father, the two of them laughing.

The plot has evolved over the years since the debut. The most conspicuous change Bourne made was to remove the subplot of the von Rothbart conspiracy to put his son on the throne. The Private Secretary now becomes just a functionary (no longer a von Rothbart counterpart, nor villain) and the Stranger is no longer shown conspiring with him. The identity of the Stranger becomes even more vague and Bourne prefers to leave him and his relationship with the Prince up to the individual interpretation of the viewer.

=== Act IV ===
In the final act, the Prince, regarded as having lost his mind, is confined to an asylum in a room with a high barred window, and is treated by a doctor and a team of nurses wearing masks that resemble the Queen's face, in a scene reminiscent of his dressing at the beginning of the ballet. The Queen visits but, again, she is still unable to fully express love for her son.

The Prince crawls into bed and appears to sleep. However, he begins writhing as he dreams of the troupe of swans emerging from under and behind, dancing around him. He wakes from his nightmare, checking under his bed and around his room for swans. His tortured expression and jerky movements convey the Prince in turmoil. His lead Swan then slowly emerges from within the Prince's bed. The Swan dances with the Prince and assures him of his continued affection. But, the rest of the swans turn on the lead Swan when he makes it clear that he values his relationship with the Prince more than he does them. They separate the two and begin attacking the Prince before the Swan leaps in to save him. The Swan embraces the Prince and envelops him in his wings. The swans' fury increases and their next attack dismembers the Swan, who then disappears. Heartbroken and despondent, the Prince wails in agony and collapses onto the bed. The Queen then finds her dead son's body and breaks down in tears. However, in death the Prince and the Swan are reunited, as shown by a tableau depicting the lead Swan tenderly holding the young Prince in his arms.

== Original cast (incomplete) ==
The show premiered at Sadler's Wells on 9 November 1995:

- Andrew Walkinshaw / Sid Mitchell as The Young Prince
- Adam Cooper / David Hughes as The Swan/The Stranger
- Scott Ambler / Ben Wright as The Prince
- Emily Piercy / Vicky Evans as The Prince's Girlfriend
- Fiona Chadwick / Isabel Mortimer as The Queen
- Renato Cinquegranna as Swan/Stranger
- Pauline Dulauroy as The Italian Princess
- Barry Atkinson as The Private Secretary
- Will Kemp as Pop Idol/Italian Escort/Big Swan
- Andrew Corbett
- Saranne Curtin
- Lee Boggess as Cygnet 2/Dog Walker

== Music ==
In order to accommodate his revised scenario, Bourne somewhat altered Tchaikovsky's score, reordering several numbers and omitting others. For example, No. 5 has been moved in its entirety from Act One to Act Three, where it follows the (reordered) national dances. Act Three has been trimmed by leaving out most of No. 19 and all of the following pas de deux.

== Productions ==
=== Original production (1995-present) ===
Matthew Bourne's Swan Lake premiered on 9 November 1995 at Sadler's Wells Theatre in London, and ran until 25 November. The cast included Adam Cooper as the Swan and the Stranger, Scott Ambler as the Prince, Emily Piercy as the Prince's Girlfriend, and Fiona Chadwick as the Queen.

From 6 February until 13 April 1996, the production toured to various venues around the United Kingdom. On 11 September 1996, Swan Lake moved to the West End at the Piccadilly Theatre and ran for 120 performances, which was the longest run ever known in London for any production of a full-length ballet.

On 25 April 1997, the production was performed at the Ahmanson Theatre in Los Angeles, and was later screened in the UK on Boxing Day on BBC Two

- 1999 UK tour revival from 2 Oct – 11 Dec 1999.
- 2004: Swan Lake played at Sadler's Wells from 30 November 2004 until 16 January 2005. Continued onto a UK Tour throughout 2005
- 2006 Christmas Season at Sadler's Wells.
- 2009 Sadler's Wells and UK tour throughout 2010
- 2018 September to May 2019 tour, with Christmas Season at Sadler's Wells.
- 2024-2025 Swan Lake: The Next Generation tour from 11 November to 7 June 2025. At Sadler's Wells from 3 December to 26 January.

=== Broadway production (1998-1999) ===
Swan Lake premiered on 8 October 1998 at the Neil Simon Theatre in New York, after previews began on 26 September. The production featured the original cast, and closed on 23 January 1999 after 124 performances.

=== International tours ===
From 2000 to 2003, the tour performed at the Dominion Theatre in London's West End and visited Japan.

The 2013 UK and international tour included Australia and the Shanghai Culture Square.

There was a 2019 UK and international tour that included Shanghai.

=== US tours ===
In 2006, the tour performed at the Cadillac Palace Theatre, Chicago and Orpheum Theatre, LA.

In 2010, the tour returned to New York City and performed a four-week season at the New York City Centre.

The 2018-2020 US tour had a 7-week Christmas Season at the Ahmanson Theatre in Los Angeles, debuted at the Kennedy Center in Washington, and concluded with its 378th and final performance on 9 February 2020 at New York City Center. The tour had performed at 34 venues, 7 countries and 4 continents with 58 dancers and crew members.

== Reception ==
=== Awards and nominations ===
Swan Lake has won more than 30 international awards, including the Olivier Award for Best New Dance Production and three Tony Awards for Best Director of a Musical, Best Choreography, and Best Costume Design. Other awards include:

- 1996, 1997 – Time Out Dance Award
- 1997 – Best Choreography, Los Angeles Drama Critics Circle Awards
- 1999 – Astaire Awards for Excellence in Dance on Broadway

=== Critical reception ===
The original production performed from 9 November 1995 to 25 November and received positive reviews, however some critics were polarized. In The Guardian, Judith Mackrell described the performance as “one of the most gripping, funny and profoundly moving dance works I’ve ever seen”, while Nicholas Droomgoole in The Sunday Telegraph was more critical, asking "“what has happened to the poetry, the drama, the beauty of the original?”

== Imagery and innovation ==
The original Swan Lake was based on the story of Ondine, a German myth with a theme common in Romanticism that was adapted by Hans Christian Andersen for his story The Little Mermaid. Ondine was a beautiful and immortal water nymph. The only threat to her eternal happiness was if she fell in love with a mortal and bore his child, as she would then lose her immortality. Ondine duly fell in love with a dashing knight, Sir Lawrence, and they were married, the knight pledging unfailing love and faithfulness to her with his every waking breath. A year after their wedding Ondine bore Lawrence a son. From that moment she began to age. As Ondine's beauty faded, Lawrence lost interest in her.

One afternoon Ondine was walking near some stables when she heard the familiar snoring of her husband. When she entered the stable, she saw Sir Lawrence lying in the arms of another woman. Kicking her husband awake, she cursed him such that he would have breath so long as he remained awake, but if he ever fell asleep his breath would be taken from him and he would die.

According to Alastair Macaulay (formerly chief dance critic of The New York Times, The Times Literary Supplement and chief theatre critic of the Financial Times), the Ondine myth is said to be an image of psycho-sexual distress: the nymph is a forlorn image of repressed virginity, anxious that she will never achieve womanly fulfillment, while her feminine nemesis that leads her husband astray represents the confident seductive power that threatens her hopes. The story is double-edged: the human protagonist, in loving the nymph, transgresses against his own kind and may be punished. If, having betrayed her once, he returns to her, her kiss will bring him death; in fact, it may be this love-in-death that the man desires most.

Bourne's Swan Lake radically reinterprets the myth. The focus of the ballet is turned away from the Ondine character to the man – the Prince. It is the Prince who struggles against repression and hopes for liberty, and who needs love to make him safe. In addition, it is not the mortal who is unfaithful to the nymph. Rather, it is the Swan who (in Act Two) expresses love for the Prince, betrays him in the form of the Stranger (Act Three), and finally returns to him (Act Four). However, as in the Ondine myth, the sin of betrayal cannot be expiated except in death.

== Politics ==
Much has been made of Bourne's decision to cast men as the swans. The original ballet is a standard in the European tradition of romanticized female–male love. The heroine, the swan princess Odette, is portrayed as powerless but lovely in accordance with conventional gender roles, and her hero is portrayed as a hunter who alone has the power to save her. Having a man in the role of lead Swan suggests that the Prince's struggle has repressed gay love at its core, and changes the realm of the plot from magical to psychological. The fierce, bird-like choreography given to the swan corps re-interprets the archetype of the swan as a pretty, feminine bird of gentle grace. According to Bourne, "The idea of a male swan makes complete sense to me. The strength, the beauty, the enormous wingspan of these creatures suggests to the musculature of a male dancer more readily than a ballerina in her white tutu."

However, the same central themes carry through both works. Both are about doomed, forbidden love, and both feature a Prince who wishes to transcend the boundaries of everyday convention through that love. Both themes have strong ties to the life of Tchaikovsky, the ballet's composer, whose homosexuality caused a number of complications in his life.

== Filmed stage productions ==
In 1998, a filmed stage production directed by Peter Mumford and featuring the original cast of the ballet (Scott Ambler as the Prince, Adam Cooper as the Swan/the Stranger) was released. It was filmed at Sadler's Wells and originally broadcast on season 26, episode 16 of the PBS series Great Performances.

In 2012, a new cast of dancers with Richard Winsor as the Prince and Dominic North as the Swan/the Stranger, as well as Nina Goldman, Madelaine Brennan, Steve Kirkham and Joseph Vaughan, was filmed at Sadler's Wells in 3D. The production was directed by Matthew Bourne and Ross MacGibbon. It was then premiered in Soho, London before being shown in various cinemas with a nationwide release. The film was later released on DVD.

A third stage production, featuring Liam Mower as the Prince and Will Bozier as the Swan, was filmed at Sadler's Wells in January 2019 and released in UK cinemas in 2019 September. It was later made available on DVD and Blu-ray.

== In popular culture ==
The final scene of the film Billy Elliot (2000) shows the lead character, Billy, played by Adam Cooper, as an adult about to perform in this production as the lead Swan.

== See also ==
- Matthew Bourne's The Car Man
- Undine, an 1811 novella by Friedrich de la Motte Fouqué featuring the Ondine myth.
