= New Adventures (dance company) =

British dance-theatre company

- Formation: 2001
- Purpose: Dance company
- Headquarters: Sadler's Wells Theatre
- Location: Islington, London
- Region served: UK and internationally
- Artistic Director: Matthew Bourne
- Affiliations: Sadler's Wells Theatre
- Website: Official website

New Adventures is a British dance-theatre company. Founded by choreographer Matthew Bourne in 2001, the company developed from an earlier company Adventures in Motion Pictures, now dissolved.

== History ==
Adventures in Motion Pictures (AMP) was established in 1987 by a group of students from London's Laban Centre, including Matthew Bourne, Catherine White (now Malone), Emma Gladstone, Susan Lewis, Carrollynne Antoun, David Massingham and Keith Brazil. AMP's productions like Spitfire (1988), parodied the manners of romantic ballet dancers.

By 1991, the original members of the company were working outside of AMP, and Bourne held auditions for new dancers, forming a company with six core dancers, including Scott Ambler (later founder artistic associate), Etta Murfitt (now associate artistic director), Ben Wright, Ally Fitzpatrick and Jamie Watton. Their first piece together was Town & Country (1991). Subsequent AMP productions included Nutcracker! (1992), Highland Fling (1994), Swan Lake (1995), Cinderella (1997) and The Car Man (2000).

In 2000, Bourne formed New Adventures with producer Robert Noble, who became co-director of the company. New Adventures Limited was incorporated in January 2001. New Adventures Charity (incorporated in 2008) is a registered charity (charity number: 1125342) that works "To advance the education of young people, dance practitioners and the general public particularly but not exclusively through the provision of workshops and classes with specific but not exclusive reference to the dance choreography of Matthew Bourne".

New Adventures has been a National Portfolio Organisation receiving funding from Arts Council England since 2015.

== Awards ==
=== Laurence Olivier Awards ===
AMP or New Adventures have received 12 Laurence Olivier Awards nominations, winning six.

| Category | Production | Year | Nomination/Win |
|---|---|---|---|
| Outstanding Achievement in Dance (Most promising small dance company to present a West End season) | Town and Country | 1992 | Nomination |
| Best New Dance Production | Nutcracker! | 1994 | Nomination |
| Best New Dance Production | Swan Lake | 1996 | Win |
| Outstanding Achievement in Dance (Lez Brotherston - Set Design & Costume) | Cinderella | 1998 | Win |
| Outstanding Achievement in Dance (Matthew Bourne - Concept and Dramatisation) | The Car Man | 2001 | Nomination |
| Best Lighting Design (Paule Constable) | Play Without Words | 2003 | Nomination |
| Best Entertainment | Play Without Words | 2003 | Win |
| Best Choreography in Theatre (Matthew Bourne) | Play Without Words | 2003 | Win |
| Best New Dance Production | Cinderella | 2011 | Nomination |
| Outstanding Achievement in Dance (Lez Brotherston - Set Design & Costume) | The Sleeping Beauty | 2013 | Nomination |
| Best Choreography in Theatre (Matthew Bourne) | The Red Shoes | 2017 | Win |
| Best Entertainment | The Red Shoes | 2017 | Win |

=== Other awards ===
Other awards won by AMP or New Adventures productions
| Award | Category | Year |
|---|---|---|
Swan Lake
| The Manchester Evening News Award | Best Touring Dance Production | 1996 |
| Gay Times Readers Poll | Outstanding Live Performance | 1996 |
| Time Out Dance Award | Adam Cooper for his performance as Swan/Stranger | 1996 |
| Los Angeles Drama Critics Circle Awards | Best Choreography | 1997 |
| The South Bank Show Award | Matthew Bourne for his Swan Lake | 1997 |
| The Evening Standard Ballet Awards | Adam Cooper for his performance as Swan/Stranger | 1997 |
| Dramalogue Awards | Musical Director (David Frame) | 1997 |
| Dramalogue Awards | Outstanding Performance (Adam Cooper and Scott Ambler) | 1997 |
| Dramalogue Awards | Director (Matthew Bourne) | 1997 |
| Dramalogue Awards | Producer (Katherine Doré) | 1997 |
| Dramalogue Awards | Set and Costume Design (Lez Brotherston) | 1997 |
| Tony Awards | Best Choreography | 1999 |
| Tony Awards | Best direction of a Musical | 1999 |
| Astaire Award | Special Award for Direction, Choreography & Concept | 1999 |
| Drama Desk Awards | Outstanding Director of a Musical (Matthew Bourne) | 1999 |
| Drama Desk Awards | Outstanding Choreography (Matthew Bourne) | 1999 |
| Drama Desk Awards | Outstanding Set Design of a Musical (Lez Brotherston) | 1999 |
| Drama Desk Awards | Outstanding Costume Design (Lez Brotherston) | 1999 |
| Drama Desk Awards | Unique Theatrical Experience | 1999 |
| Outer Circle Critics Awards | Outstanding Director of a Musical (Matthew Bourne) | 1999 |
| Outer Circle Critics Awards | Outstanding Choreography (Matthew Bourne) | 1999 |
| Outer Circle Critics Awards | Outstanding Costume Design (Lez Brotherston) | 1999 |
The Car Man
| Evening Standard Award | Musical Event | 2000 |
| Los Angeles Drama Critics Award | Best Choreography | 2000 |
Edward Scissorhands
| Drama Desk Award | Unique Theatrical Experience | 2007 |
