= Darshan Singh Bhuller =

British dancer

Darshan Singh Bhuller (born 4 March 1961) is a British dancer, teacher, artistic director, filmmaker, and choreographer. Considered "one of the brightest stars of his generation" and a "darkly powerful performer," Bhuller danced for London Contemporary Dance Theatre, Siobhan Davies Dance Company, and was assistant director for Richard Alston Dance Company before revitalizing Phoenix Dance Theatre as its artistic director.

== Early life and dance career ==
The eldest of five, Bhuller was born in Singapore to a traditional Punjabi Indian family. After spending his early years in India, the family emigrated to the UK when he was six. Bhuller was introduced to dance by the teacher Nadine Senior at Harehills Middle School in Leeds. At 16, he moved to London where he completed his training at London School of Contemporary Dance with Martha Graham Dance Company luminaries Jane Dudley, Noemi Lapzeson, Robert Cohan, and William Louther. Two years later Bhuller was invited to join London Contemporary Dance Theatre (LCDT) where he would become one of the company's most critically acclaimed dancers.

During his career with LCDT, 1979 to 1994, Bhuller worked with the company as a dancer, rehearsal director, teacher, and choreographer. During this period he also danced for Siobhan Davies Dance Company in 1991. After departing LDCT, he became assistant director of Richard Alston Dance Company from 1994 to 1996, after which he retired from performing to focus on creating full-time.

== Choreographic and directing career ==
Bhuller choreographed his first work, Beyond the Law - based on Athol Fugard's Statements After An Arrest Under the Immorality Act - for LCDT soon after he joined the company. Impressed by his choreographic talent, the company commissioned him in 1982 to create a piece in honour of Pope John Paul II for a performance at Cardiff. Over the past 30 years Bhuller has been commissioned to create original works for a wide range of companies including: Scottish Dance Theatre, Rambert Dance Company, CandoCo, Nordic Dance Theatre, CeDeCe, Companhia de Bailado Contemporaneo, and Shaolin Wheel of Life, which he also assistant directed. Critically lauded work created by Bhuller includes: Heart of Chaos, Stand and Stare, Planted Seeds, Fall Like Rain, Requiem, Recall, Eng-er-land, Caravaggio: Exile and Death, Prometheus Awakens, Rites of War, and Mapping.

Having choreographed five original works for the company between 1983 and 1996, Bhuller was appointed artistic director of Phoenix Dance Theatre in 2002, during which time he rehabilitated its reputation, including winning the 2006 Critic's Circle National Dance Award for Outstanding Modern Repertoire. He stepped down from leading Phoenix following a successful international tour to the US in 2006. Since leaving the company, Bhuller has returned to freelance directing, choreographing, and guest teaching throughout the US and UK at such schools as The Alvin Ailey School, Fordham University, Marymount Manhattan College, New World School of The Arts, The Rambert School, The Place, English National Ballet School, Central School of Ballet, Danshögskolan, London School of Contemporary Dance, Northern School of Contemporary Dance, Terence Lewis Contemporary Dance Company, Franco Dragone’s company in Macau, Martha Graham Center of Contemporary Dance, and Florida State University.

In 1985, Bhuller directed the first of his many award-winning films - Breaking the Surface - in collaboration with the painter Graham Dean, which they sold to the UK's Channel 4. Other films include The Fall - which he co-produced through his company Singh Productions with BBC 2 - the documentary Harmonica Breakdown: speaking about the dance, What About Sky for MTV and ITV Chart Show, and Another Place which focused on his mentor at LCDT, Robert Cohan. Bhuller's recent work includes the documentaries Das Model; The Dancer and Lola, Shuffle It Right, Something to do, Roughcut, and All American Alston by Richard Alston.

In 2022, Bhuller worked with award-winning dancer PeiJu Chien-Pott to create NALA, a short film about mourning the loss of a child. The film won numerous awards including Best Dance Short at the 2022 Oz Indie Film Festival, Best Avant-Garde Film at the 2024 Faro Film Festival, Best Short at the 2022 Global Shorts, and the Bronze Award at the 2022 Tokyo Film Awards. That same year, he became one of the Founding Directors of the Sir Robert Cohan Legacy. During his tenure with the organization, he led production on the organization's events "On the And" and "Beyond the M25." In 2023, Bhuller was made an Honorary Fellow of the Northern School of Contemporary Dance for his work in dance and theatre.

== Personal life ==
Bhuller is married to the film-producer and former dancer Sallie Estep. The couple was married in New York City. They have two daughters and four grandchildren.

The couple resides in Brooklyn.
