= Peter Mumford (lighting designer) =

Peter Mumford is an international lighting designer who trained at the Central School of Art in London. He won Laurence Olivier Awards for his work, in 1995 and 2003.

== Biography ==
Peter Mumford trained at the Central School of Art in London, under Ralph Koltai, in the late Sixties. In 1969, during his last year at art school, he became a founder member of the mixed media experimental theatre group Moving Being (director Geoff Moore), with whom he worked as designer and lighting and projection designer on all productions until 1978. Mumford moved to Cardiff with Moving Being in 1972, where he designed a temporary theatre space for the new Chapter Arts Centre. After that he continued to work with Moving Being on a project basis but began a wider based freelance career. In the late Seventies he became a part-time member of the faculty of the London Contemporary Dance School at The Place, teaching a course relating choreography to visual art and design and also at that time began collaborating with a number of choreographers in their early work at The Place, such as Siobhan Davies, Richard Alston, Ian Spink and many others. When the company Second Stride was formed in the early Eighties Peter was a founding collaborator as lighting designer - another working relationship that would last for nearly another decade. In the Eighties, Peter designed the lighting for a huge number of dance works for companies such as London Contemporary Dance Theatre, Rambert Dance Company, Second Stride, Siobhan Davies Dance Company and many other individual projects at that time. He also continued to design projects with Moving Being like the major site specific “Mabinogion” - first at Carnarvon Castle and later in Cardiff. His work gradually expanded into opera, designing sets/costumes and lighting for “Parsifal“ for Welsh National Opera in 1978 and then into drama more towards the end of the 1980s. The Overgrown Path at The Royal Court Theatre in 1985 was the first straight play he lit in London.

In 1986 he co-founded Dancelines Productions, a film/TV production company committed to creating and producing dance for television. He produced and directed many programmes/films for Dancelines for both Channel 4 and BBC2 up until the mid- Nineties and during that period the work won many awards including OperaScreen IMZ 1991- Best New Work / DanceScreen 1992 - Best Studio Adaptation/ Video Danse Grand Prix 1994 - best series (Dance House) and an Emmy Award Nomination for the TV adaptation of Matthew Bourne’s Swan Lake which Peter directed. The last real work in this area was the series “48 Preludes and Fugues” (Bach) for BBC2 in 2002 - 48 short films, of which Peter directed 24 and was lighting director on the rest. His work is now predominantly in the area of lighting design, but still designs sets on certain projects and most recently was Director of Photography for Francesca Zambello’s film of “The Little Prince”.

He has directed on occasion in the theatre as well as film and television. Productions include “Hamletmachine” and “No, to the Yes-sayer” (Jasager/Neinsager); both at St. Stephens Theatrespace in Cardiff. “The Man with the Foot-soles of Wind”; Almeida Opera. “Earth and the Great Weather”; Almeida Opera. “ L’Heure Espangnol” & L’Enfant et Les Sortileges”; Opera Zuid.

Work in the theatre nowadays, is spread fairly equally across drama, dance (ballet) and opera.

Most recent work includes “Corybantic Games” (Royal Ballet); “John” (National Theatre, London); “My Name Is Lucy Barton” (The Bridge Theatre); “The Way Of The World" (Donmar Warehouse); “The Ferryman” (The Gielgud Theatre); “Long Day's Journey Into Night” (Wyndham's Theatre, London); “Carmen” (The Metropolitan Opera, New York).

Peter was Chairman of the British Association of Lighting Designers from 2011 to 2017.

== Awards ==
- Laurence Olivier Award 1995 - Outstanding Achievement in Dance
- Crystal Award, Prague - Matthew Bourne's Swan Lake (Film)
- Opera Screen IMZ 1991 - Best New Work, Heaven Ablaze In His Breast
- Dance Screen 1991 - Best Studio Adaption, White Man Sleeps
- Irish Theatre Awards 2001 - Best Lighting Design, Iphigenia (Abbey Theatre)
- Laurence Olivier Award 2003 - Best Lighting Design, The Bacchai (National Theatre)
- Knight of Illumination 2010 - Best Lighting Design for a play, Sucker Punch (Royal Court Theatre)
- Helpmann Awards 2013 - Best Lighting Design, King Kong Live On Stage
- Green Room Award 2013 - Best Lighting Design, King Kong Live On Stage
- The South Bank Sky Arts Awards 2017 - Opera Award, The Ring Cycle

== Personal life ==
Peter splits his time between London and Kefalonia with his wife, Alix Harvey-Thompson.
