= Celeste Dandeker =

British dancer

Celeste Dandeker OBE
- Born: 1950s
- Other names: Celeste Dandeker-Arnold
- Education: London Contemporary Dance School
- Occupations: Choreographer, Dancer and Patron
- Known for: founding a dance company
- Spouse: Trevor Arnold

Celeste Dandeker OBE (born c. 1952) is a British dancer who fell and was left with quadriplegia. She is known for co-founding the Candoco Dance Company which features both disabled and able-bodied dancers. She has danced, designed costumes, created dances and she became the artistic director and then patron of Candoco.

== Early life and education ==
Dandeker was an Anglo-Indian born in about 1952 and she won a place at the London Contemporary Dance School in 1968.

== Career ==
She was a promising dancer but when dancing the lead at Manchester Opera House on 8 December 1973 she misjudged a somersault and ended up landing on her chin. A doctor summoned from the audience called an end to the evening and she ended up in the wings in agony. Dandeker found out three days later that she had broken her neck and would never walk again. She spent months at a spinal unit in Oswestry. She had lost control of her abdomen and hands and was left with quadriplegia. She was able to write, gesture and smoke as she learnt how to grip with fingers that she could not control. The dance company made a settlement which allowed her to hire her own carer and she went to study costume design at Croydon College of Art, and subsequently designed costumes for the Union Dance Company, the London Contemporary Dance Theatre, the National Youth Dance Theatre, Graeae, and Candoco's own production of Flying in the Face of....

Her dance career was revived when dancer and film maker Darshan Singh Bhuller sought her out to feature in a BBC2 TV film he was making called "The Fall". The story was similar to her story and she was required to dance from her wheelchair. This one-off request led to her being invited to teach dance to people with disabilities by Adam Benjamin. These classes grew and Dandeker and Benjamin founded the CanDoCo Dance Company in 1991. Dandeker and Benjamin were determined that they were not going to be a dance therapy group, disabled dancing or to be a modern freak show. The idea that they would excel as dancers outlived their first few years when they won many awards but were also seen as the latest idea. Dandekar was appointed a Member of the Order of the British Empire (MBE) in the 1997 New Year Honours "for services to Dance and to Disabled People." The dancers that they started with stayed for eight years and in 1999 she gave up dancing to concentrate on the artistic direction of CanDoCo.

In 2007 she decided to retire as artistic director of Candoco, and she became a patron. She was promoted to an Officer of the Order of the British Empire (OBE) for services to Dance in the 2007 New Year Honours, and she was awarded the 2007 Jane Attenborough Dance Award for her singular contribution to dance in Britain.

== Personal life ==
Dandeker is married to Trevor Arnold. When they re-met and married in 2004, their forty-year off-and-on romance made national news. Dandeker also uses the name Celeste Dandeker-Arnold.

== Selected works ==
- The Fall (1990 film) - lead dancer
- Flying in the Face of... (1992) - costume design
- Once Upon a Time in England (1992)
- Christy Don't Leave So Soon (1992) - choreography
- Deuce (1998) choreography
