= Riccardo Buscarini =

Italian dancer and choreographer

Riccardo Buscarini (born 1980s) is an Italian choreographer and director

== Life and career ==
Buscarini was born in Castel San Giovanni Piacenza, Italy. He came to dance at 17, approaching ballet and contemporary dance studying at Accademia Domenichino da Piacenza, to then move to the London Contemporary Dance School, The Place, where he graduated in July 2009. Interested in choreography and in its dialogue with visual arts and cinema and music, he has presented his works in the United Kingdom, Italy, Spain and Switzerland in theatres, urban spaces and art galleries. In 2010 he received a danceWEB scholarship for Impulstanz, Vienna's international contemporary dance festival and one of the 16 choreographic commissions of The Place Prize, sponsored by Bloomberg.

In April 2011 Riccardo Buscarini won Premio Prospettiva Danza, Padua (Italy) with 'volta', fragment #1 of the Family Tree trilogy, a project by disabled performer and director Chiara Bersani. In 2011 Riccardo was also announced one of the 8 Creatives in Residence at The Hospital Club, London.

In the frame of CiR he has collaborated with knitwear designer Brooke Roberts, for whom he choreographed (Wo)man + Machine, her fashion presentation part of the London Fashion Week (Sep 2011, The Hospital Club).

Riccardo Buscarini's project '10 tracks for the end of the world' won Fondo Fare Anticorpi 2012, a contemporary dance fund given to emerging artists from Emilia Romagna, Italy.

In 2013, he has won The Place Prize, sponsored by Bloomberg with the piece 'Athletes', featuring costumes by fashion designer Brooke Roberts and was one of the three UK based choreographers involved in ArtsCross London 2013, an international choreographic research project between the United Kingdom, China and Taiwan part of ResCen, Middlesex University.

In 2015 Riccardo took part in the international residency MAM-Maroc Artist Meeting in Marrakesh, Morocco, during which he created two installations exhibited at the Museum of Moroccan Arts. In 2015 he also created non finito a sei voci a short work on the students of Scuola del Balletto di Toscana, Florence. His latest independent creation No Lander is now on tour. In 2016 he presented In Parting Glass, an exhibition in collaboration with Richard Taylor at Summerhall, Edinburgh and collaborated with Flow Architecture for the creation of INTERTWINED, an installation part of London Festival of Architecture 2016, presented a new installation as part of 'i'm NOT tino sehgal' at Nahmad Projects, London (then presented at miart, fiera internazionale di arte moderna e contemporanea di Milano 2017, Milan) and directed his first opera, Gaetano Donizetti’s Don Pasquale.

From December 2011 to 2015 he taught choreography and performance at Birkbeck University of London. He has taught professionals in Italy, the United Kingdom, Spain, Sweden and Russia.
