= Elaine Feeney =

Irish writer

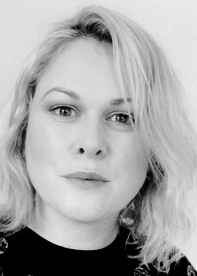
- Born: 1979 (age 46–47); Athenry, County Galway, Ireland
- Writing career
- Notable works: Where's Katie? (2010); The Radio Was Gospel (2013); Rise (2017); As You Were (2020); How to Build a Boat (2023)
- Notable awards: McKitterick Prize (2021); Dalkey Literary Award – Emerging Writer (2021); Kate O'Brien (2021); Cuirt Festival Grand Slam; North Beaches Night Poetry Prize

Elaine Feeney (born 1979) is an Irish poet, novelist, and playwright. Her writing focuses on "the central themes of history, national identity, and state institutions, and she examines how these forces structure the everyday lives of Irish women". A former slam poetry winner, she has been described as "an experienced writer who has been wrestling with poetry on page and on stage since 2006" and in 2015 was heralded as "one of the most provocative poets to come out of Ireland in the last decade". Her work has been widely translated.

Feeney's debut novel, As You Were, was contracted at auction in December 2019. It was published by Penguin Random House, under the Harvill Secker imprint, on 20 August 2020. In January 2020, The Observer newspaper chose Feeney as one of the best debut novelists of the year and the book was shortlisted for the Rathbones Folio Prize and the Dalkey Literary Award (Emerging Writer) in 2021.

== Personal life ==
Feeney grew up on a farm in Athenry, County Galway. She attended Scoil Croi Naofa, Athenry, Presentation College Athenry, University College Galway (now National University of Ireland, Galway (NUIG)), University College Cork and University of Limerick. She lives in Athenry.

== Professional life ==
Feeney lectures at NUIG, where she is also Creative Director for the Tuam Oral History Project. Her festival performances include Cúirt International Literature Festival, The Ex-Border Festival in Italy, The Edinburgh Fringe Festival, The Vilenica Festival and The Electric Picnic. Her magazine publications include The Poetry Review, The Paris Review, The Stinging Fly, Oxford Poetry, Poetry Ireland Review, The Irish Times, The Manchester Review, Stonecutter Journal and Coppernickel. Feeney's work has been collected by the Irish Poetry Reading Archive at University College Dublin. She is a regular leader of writing workshops, including for the Galway Feminist Collective and Cúirt International Literature Festival. Her work has been broadcast by RTÉ and other broadcasters.Arena Tuesday 29 January 2013 Feeney's political views have been sought by publications including the Irish Times. In response to a question about politics and her poetry, she told headstuff.org: "I think all humans are political, at least the political world would have you believe, or inflict this on you, and each of us in our own peculiar way eventually marches to this tune, whether it’s complicit, as agitator, or an escapist or whatever way you have actively chosen to live your life."

== Writing ==
Feeney is the author of three poetry collections, a play text, and two novels. The novelist Mike McCormack has written that her poems have "a pounding physical presence yet they run away with the mind." A review of her most recent collection, Rise, in P. N. Review, states that its effect is "to explode the idea of canon with an intense exploration of personal life and its public manifestations". Speaking to The Poetry Review in 2017 Feeney described her approach to writing: "I rarely remember the actual physical act of writing a poem. Some take days, some years". In 2020, before the launch of her debut novel, she told The Observer that she had "an anxiety around writing a novel that I didn't feel around writing poetry, weirdly ... Also I had my first son quite young – I was only 22 – and poetry was quicker." Elsewhere, she has said that "sometimes my work comes in madly chaotic spurts, uncomfortable intrusions, poem ideas often come at me, quite brutally out of nowhere, and I'll write them, and I may never be able to fully explain them, and sometimes they leaving me feeling really uncomfortable and awkward."

Feeney was the winner of the 2021 Dalkey Literary Awards "emerging writer" award.

In April 2022, Harvill Secker bought Feeney's second novel, How to Build a Boat, in a 'major' two-novel deal from Peter Straus at Rogers, Coleridge and White. It was longlisted for the 2023 Booker Prize.

== Bibliography ==
=== Poetry collections ===
- Where's Katie? (2010, Salmon Poetry)
- The Radio Was Gospel (2013, Salmon Poetry)
- Rise (2017, Salmon Poetry)

=== Novel ===
- As You Were (2020, Harvill Secker)
- How to Build a Boat (2023, Harvill Secker)

=== Playtext ===
- WRoNGHEADED (2016, Liz Roche Company)

=== Short stories ===
- A Little Unsteadily into Light (2022, New Island Books)
- Same, Same (2023, The Paris Review, Issue 243)
- The Art of the Glimpse: 100 Irish Short Stories (2021, Head of Zeus)

== External ==
- "Rise", read by Elaine Feeney
