= The Place Prize =

The Place Prize was a prestigious contemporary dance award, given to the winner of a biennial choreography competition organised by The Place in London.

The Place Prize was created in 2004 and sponsored by Bloomberg since its inception. With the stated aim of creating an award for choreographers comparable to the Turner Prize for visual artists and the Man Booker Prize for novelists, The Place Prize 2004 commissioned 20 UK-based artists to create new 15 minute works following an open application process; performances of these works were staged at The Place in September 2004 with Rafael Bonachela, Rosemary Butcher, Hofesh Shechter, Tom Roden & Pete Shenton and Bawren Tavaziva chosen as the five finalists. These finalists staged ten further performances, before a panel of judges named Rafael Bonachela as the inaugural Place Prize winner. The Place Prize awarded over £120,000 to dance artists in 2004, with £40,000 distributed between the five finalists and £25,000 going to the overall winner.

The second Place Prize was held in 2006, with Nina Rajarani announced as the winner on Saturday 30 September.

The third Place Prize in 2008 named former Royal Ballet dancer Adam Linder as the overall winner.

The fourth edition of Place Prize in 2010 saw a new phased approach to the competition, with the Semi-Finals held in September, and the Finals in April 2011. A total of 16 works were chosen to premiere in a series of public performances in London at The Place during the Semi-finals. Three competitors were selected by a panel of dance experts, and one by audience vote, to compete in the Finals in April the following year for £35,000 in prize money. The winners of the 4th edition were Lost Dog, with the piece It Needs Horses.

The fifth and last edition of the Place Prize in 2013 was won by choreographer Riccardo Buscarini.

The Place Prize was open to all UK-based choreographers working in contemporary dance. The shortlisted commissions were selected by a dance panel chaired by Eddie Nixon, Director of Theatre and Artist Development at The Place.

The Place Prize, sponsored by Bloomberg, was the biggest single source of commissions for new short works in British dance. By the end of the 5th edition, it had enabled the creation of 92 original pieces of choreography, most of which remained in the artists' repertories, and toured in theatres and festivals nationally and internationally. The Place Prize invested over £1m in new British dance, and brought leading artists to international attention.
