= Scarborough Convent School =

Former school in Scarborough, North Yorkshire, England

Scarborough Convent School, also known as The Convent of the Ladies of Mary Grammar School and many variations, was a girls' school in Scarborough, North Yorkshire, England, from 1882 until 1975.

The school was founded by a Belgian order of nuns, the Daughters of Joseph and Mary, who had established their first English school, Coloma Convent Girls' School which is still open, in Croydon in 1869.

An 1890 directory of Scarborough said:

St. Mary's Convent School is situated in Queen Street, and was built by the Sisters, after a three years' residence in Scarborough, in 1885. The course of instruction comprises all the branches of a superior English and French education, pupils being prepared for the Cambridge Local Examination, College of Preceptors, &c. The house and grounds are spacious and cost £16,000.

— Bulmer's History and Directory of North Yorkshire, 1890

and a 1919 Register of Catholic Colleges and Schools in The Tablet lists it as:

SCARBOROUGH, Yorks.—Convent of the Ladies of Mary, Boarding School and Day School for Young Ladies. Preparation for Exams : Oxford Local Exams. Matriculation London and Northam Universities; Music (Royal Academy).

— The Tablet.

The school operated from two sites, with the younger pupils based at a building in South Cliff and the seniors based at the convent in Queen Street. Some girls were boarders, and there were about 300 pupils before it closed.

In 1975 the school closed and its main building was sold to North Yorkshire County Council, initially used as premises for some students of the Graham School and later developed as housing for the elderly, named "Maria's Court". A statue of the Sacred Heart was rescued from the school site and moved to St Augustine's Catholic School in the town.

Archaeologists investigated the former school site between 1996 and 1999, and found medieval and Roman material.

== Notable former pupils ==
- Dame Susan Hill (born 1942), writer
- Nadine Senior (1939-2016), founder of Northern School of Contemporary Dance
- Judy Gridley (1946-1987), actress playing Elaine Webster in Coronation Street 1984-1985
