= Richard Alston (choreographer) =

British choreographer (1948–2026)

Sir Richard Alston CBE
- Born: Richard John William Alston; 30 October 1948; Stoughton, Sussex. England
- Died: 7 September 2026 (aged 77); London, England
- Education: Eton College; London School of Contemporary Dance
- Occupation: Choreographer
- Website: www.richardalstondance.org

Sir Richard John William Alston CBE (30 October 1948 – 7 September 2026) was a British choreographer. He was resident choreographer and artistic director for the Ballet Rambert, and later became the artistic director at The Place. His works included Windhover (1972), Soda Lake (1986), and Pulcinella (1987).

== Life and career ==
Richard John William Alston was born in Stoughton, Sussex, on 30 October 1948. Educated at Eton College, Alston trained as a dancer at the London School of Contemporary Dance, and then choreographed for the London Contemporary Dance Theatre before forming the UK's first independent dance company, Strider, in 1972.

In 1976, Alston went to New York City to study at the Merce Cunningham Dance Studio. In 1980, he was appointed resident choreographer with Ballet Rambert, serving as the company's artistic director from 1986 to 1992.

During that time, he created 25 works for Ballet Rambert as well as the Royal Danish Ballet (1982), the Royal Ballet (1983), and two solo works for Michael Clark (Soda Lake and Dutiful Ducks). He returned to Rambert in 2001, creating Unrest for the company's 70th anniversary.

In 1981, Alston's dance company, "Strider", had merged with choreographer Siobhan Davies's company "Siobhan Davies and Dancers", to form "Second Stride".

A revival of his Dangerous Liaisons (1985) was toured by Scottish Ballet in 2003.

In 1994, Alston took up the post of artistic director at The Place and formed The Richard Alston Dance Company; he made more than 50 pieces for the company.

In 2011, Alston created a new ballet en pointe, A Rugged Flourish, for New York Theatre Ballet.

Alston died at his home in London on 7 September 2026, aged 77.

== Honours ==
Alston was made an honorary Doctor of Philosophy (Dance) at the University of Surrey in 1992 and in 2003 he received an honorary MA from University College Chichester.

In 1995, he was named Chevalier dans l'Ordre des Arts et des Lettres in recognition of his work in France.

In the 2001 New Year Honours, Alston was appointed a Commander of the Order of the British Empire (CBE) for services to dance. He was knighted in the 2019 New Year Honours, again for services to dance.

== Dance company ==
Alston's own dance company was launched in 1994 to critical acclaim. In 2002, the BBC commissioned Alston to choreograph excerpts from The Rite of Spring for their Masterworks series directed by Jonathan Haswell. In 2003, Martin Lawrance's Grey Allegro was introduced into the repertoire – the first time another choreographer's work hasbeen performed by the company.

In May 2004, the company made its New York debut with a week of performances at the Joyce Theater. In March 2020, the Richard Alston Dance Company ceased activity in line with new priorities for touring, agreed between The Place and Arts Council England.
