= Nadine Senior =

British contemporary dancer

Nadine Senior, MBE (born Nadine Pickles; 4 October 1939 – 28 January 2016) was the founding principal of the Northern School of Contemporary Dance in Leeds, England.

== Personal life ==
Senior was born Nadine Pickles, in Scarborough, North Yorkshire, on 4 October 1939. She attended Friarage School and the Scarborough Convent Grammar School, and then studied at a college in Leeds.

== Professional life ==
In the late 1950s, Senior had encountered the work of Rudolf von Laban while at teacher training college, and she went on to apply his ideas while teaching PE and athletics then when holding the position of deputy headmistress at Harehills Middle School in Harehills, Leeds. She introduced all the pupils to dance, saying that "children are natural movers," and that "dance is one of the few art forms where they have the edge over adults, and they can relate to it immediately."

Forty of her pupils, mostly male, became professional dancers, including the group of young men who moved on to Intake High School and later formed the all black, all male dance company Phoenix Dance Theatre. The award-winning choreographer Darshan Singh Bhuller became the company's artistic director in 2002.

In 1985, Senior established the Northern School of Contemporary Dance (NSCD), which offers degree and postgraduate courses in dance, and also youth and community courses. The School offers the only conservatoire-level professional dance training in the United Kingdom outside London.

Senior retired in 2001, and was Chair of the Trustees of Phoenix Dance Theatre for the next six years. She was appointed a Member of the Order of the British Empire (MBE) for services to dance.

== Death and legacy ==
Senior died on 28 January 2016, aged 76, following a stroke. Those attending her funeral included Richard Alston, Namron, David Hughes, Kenneth Tharp and Janet Smith.

In 2017, the Phoenix Dance Theatre hosted a Celebration Gala to pay tribute to Senior after he death, with the event including a staging of Robert North’s Troy Game (1974).

In 2021, the Northern School of Contemporary Dance launched the Nadine Senior Legacy Fund to provide financial assistance for students from groups underrepresented in higher education.

In September 2024, a commemorative blue plaque in honour of Senior was unveiled in Leeds by her son, Gareth Senior. The unveiling event also included a performance by nine students who danced New Work by Amaury Lebrun. The plaque was funded by the Northern School of Contemporary Dance.

Senior's name is one of those featured on the sculpture Ribbons, unveiled in 2024.

== See also ==
- List of dancers
