= London Contemporary Dance School =

Dance school in London, England

Coordinates: 51.5272°N 0.1288°W

- Type: Contemporary dance school
- Established: 1966 (Foundation); 1982 (Granted degree-awarding powers)
- Affiliations: University of the Arts London
- Principal: Clare Connor
- Students: Approximately 250
- Undergraduates: 200
- Postgraduates: 50
- Location: London, United Kingdom
- Website: http://www.theplace.org.uk/study

London Contemporary Dance School (informally LCDS) is a contemporary dance school located in London, England. Previously part of the Conservatoire for Dance and Drama, since 2022 LCDS has been independently registered with the Office for Students. It was founded by Robin Howard in 1966 to train new dancers for his company, London Contemporary Dance Theatre.

LCDS is based at The Place in the Bloomsbury area of Central London.

== History ==
London Contemporary Dance School and its partner company, London Contemporary Dance Theatre, were founded in 1966 under the governance of the Contemporary Dance Trust. After receiving support from its founder, Robin Howard, the Contemporary Dance Trust moved to 17 Duke's Road in 1969, which it renamed The Place. In 1978, with assistance from the Arts Council and Linbury Trust, The Place underwent a major redevelopment, with new studios created for the School on Flaxman Terrace. In 1982, LCDS began offering a BA Honours degree in Contemporary Dance, validated by the University of Kent.

In 1994, London Contemporary Dance Theatre was closed and the Richard Alston Dance Company formed. In October 2001 a £7.5 million redevelopment of The Place, including the construction of six new dance studios, was completed. In the same year LCDS and the Royal Academy of Dramatic Arts (RADA) formed the Conservatoire for Dance and Drama. In 2008 a £1.1 million development at The Place added two new further studios.

In 2021, LCDS moved to a new validation partnership with University of the Arts London. The first postgraduate students graduated with UAL-validated degrees in 2023, and the first undergraduates in 2024. In December 2022, LCDS was awarded World-Leading Specialist Provider Funding by the Office for Students and in December 2023 LCDS was awarded an overall Silver rating with Gold for student experience in the Teaching Excellence Framework (TEF).

== Teaching ==
LCDS teaches a variety of contemporary dance techniques including release-based, Limón, Humphrey and Contact Improvisation, as well as dance and performance styles including hip-hop/groove, authentic jazz, circus skills, flying low and South Asian dance techniques. As part of its courses LCDS also offers pilates, body conditioning, free electives in Choreology, Anatomy and Scenography, and ballet studies. The course is developed on the principles of periodisation, a training method developed from sport science using the strategic planning of training, performances, and rest periods to optimise physical and psychological wellbeing.

LCDS provides both undergraduate and postgraduate vocational training as well as a PhD research programme in contemporary dance. The School also offers courses in contemporary dance in London for adults and children, including a Centre for Advanced Training prevocational training programme for young people in the South East.

== Alumni ==
LCDS's first year's intake included Richard Alston, Ian Spink and Siobhan Davies who went on to perform with the main company before founding their own. Other notable alumni of LCDS include: Annie Stainer, Darshan Singh Bhuller, Seeta Indrani, Sally Potter, Liz Roche, Kenneth Tharp, Studio Lenca, Paul Liburd, Jonzi-D, Anthony Van Laast, Celeste Dandeker, Fiona Quilligan, Etta Murfitt, Joan Cleville, and Sharon Watson.

Students of the School have gone on to perform with a variety of prestigious dance companies including Adventures in Motion Pictures/New Adventures, Random Dance Company/Company Wayne McGregor, DV8, CandoCo, Diversions/National Dance Company Wales and Rambert, as well as working as choreographers, movement directors and artistic and creative directors of their own performance companies.
