= Namron =

British dancer (born 1945)

Namron Yarrum (born Norman Murray, 1945) is a Black British dancer and was one of the first black dancers to be employed by a British professional dance company.

He was born in 1945 in Jamaica and came to the United Kingdom in 1959 aged 13. He joined the Willesden Jazz Ballet Group, the only male in the 46 members, in 1961, while studying as an engineering apprentice at AEI. For a year he kept his dancing secret from his parents, and "all hell broke loose" when he invited them to his first performance, but they later allowed him to study at the Rambert Ballet School when he won a scholarship there.

He was one of the founders of the London Contemporary Dance Theatre in 1969, and Alastair Macaulay describes him as "a striking member of its ensemble for its first ten years or more".

In 1985 he was one of the founding members of staff of the Northern School of Contemporary Dance in Leeds, West Yorkshire, led by Nadine Senior.

He was appointed O.B.E. in the 2014 Birthday Honours, "For services to Dance".

Namron was given a Lifetime Achievement Award at the 2024 Black British Theatre Awards.
