= Gill Clarke =

Gill Clarke (1954–2011) was a British contemporary dancer, dance teacher, choreographer, movement consultant and researcher. An advocate for independent dancers, she also co-directed the Independent Dance company from 1996–2011. She was awarded an MBE in 1998.

== Life and career ==
Clarke was born on December 9, 1954. She grew up in Cambridge, where her father worked as a biochemist/microbiologist in cancer research. At school, she was good at sports, competing as a hurdler at national level. She took dance classes, from the age of seven, with Mari Bicknell founder of the Cambridge Ballet Workshop. After gaining a first-class degree in English and education from the University of York in 1977, she started her dance career. In the nineteen eighties, she performed with Janet Smith and Dancers and also worked with choreographers such as Janet Smith, Rosemary Butcher, and Rosemary Lee.

In 1982, Clarke helped to establish the national advocacy organisation Dance UK, now known as One Dance UK. In 1988, she became a founder member of Siobhan Davies company where she remained until 1999. Clarke taught master classes and workshops in dance in Britain and abroad.

In 1990 she began teaching at the Holborn Centre for Performing Arts, which catered for freelance dancers by offering day time classes. The offering gradually developed into Independent Dance, directed by Clarke and Fiona Millward. The organisation still supports the independence of dance artists who, while perhaps not having permanent work, nevertheless want to continue learning, practicing and researching.

In 1998, with Rachel Gibson, Clarke researched and wrote the Independent Dance Review for the Arts Council England. The report highlighted the difficulties of being an independent dance artist.

Clarke was involved in revitalising Chisenhale Dance Space, an artist-led centre for experimental dance in Bow, east London. She was a member of their board until 2010. Clarke often collaborated with people working in other disciplines. At the Southbank Centre, she brought together choreographers with composers, poets and filmmakers. At the Barbican Art Gallery she helped to incorporate dance within their visual arts exhibitions for example in the exhibition- Pioneers of the Downtown Scene, New York 1970s. At the Serpentine Gallery she was involved in the I Love Egypt project. Clarke also worked with Gandini Juggling helping to move their performances from traditional juggling to choreographed theatrical spectacle.

From 2000 to 2006, Clarke was head of performance studies at the Laban Centre, now Trinity Laban. She rewrote the undergraduate programme to include, for example, experiential anatomy, the Alexander Technique, and Feldenkrais Technique. She created modules for a new Master of Arts in Creative Practice to be run by Independent Dance in partnership with Siobhan Davies Dance. The MA was designed for mid-career professional artists.

In 2010, Clarke became involved in cross-disciplinary projects at PAL (Performing Arts Lab, also at Siobhan Davies Studios), did research into dance training and gave advice to the new Centre for Advanced Training programme for young dancers at Dance4. In February 2011, Clarke started a research lab in London looking into the relationship between Movement and Meaning. This involved collaboration between dancers, scientists, philosophers, psychologists and social anthropologists. Clarke’s last work, commissioned for the Bargehouse, was A Dance of Ownership, a Song in Hand. Clarke died on 15 November 2011. She is survived by her brother, Peter Clarke.

== Awards ==
Clarke was an Honorary Visiting Professor at University of Ulster, a joint Fellow of the National Endowment for Science, Technology and the Arts (NESTA) and Patron of the Foundation for Community Dance. Clarke received a London Dance and Performance Award and, in 1998, an MBE, which she returned in protest of the UK government’s foreign policy in Iraq. In January 2011, Clarke was awarded the Jane Attenborough Dance UK industry award at the Critics' Circle National Dance awards for her outstanding contribution to dance.

== Legacy ==
In 2024, Independent Dance offered Gill Clarke bursaries of between £1,000 and £2,500 towards taking the MA/MFA Creative Practice: Dance Professional, course led by Trinity Laban Conservatoire of Music and Dance in partnership with Independent Dance and Siobhan Davies Studios.
