= Yarrum =

Yarrum may refer to:

- Namron Yarrum (born 1945, birthname Murray Norman), British dancer
- Yarram, town in Victoria, Australia
