= Fiona Quilligan =

Irish dancer and choreographer

- Born: 1958 (age 67–68); Dublin, Ireland
- Education: London School of Contemporary Dance
- Known for: choreography, dance
- Notable work: Ancestor Reconfigured; Casts and Conversations; Fertility Dance; Cúchulainn a Chroí; Anna Livia Plurabelle
- Style: Contemporary dance
- Elected: Aosdána (2017)
- Website: fionaquilligan.info

Fiona Quilligan (born 1958) is an Irish choreographer, ballerina and contemporary dancer. She is a member of Aosdána, an elite Irish association of artists.

== Early life and education ==
Quilligan was born in Dublin in 1958. In her teens she saw Joan Davis doing Terez Nelson's class and was impressed by her use of the Graham technique; both women were contemporary dance pioneers in Ireland.

== Career ==
Quilligan studied at the Dún Laoghaire College of Art and Design and the London School of Contemporary Dance and from 1982 to 1986 was with the Dublin City Ballet. In 1986, she founded Rubato Ballet, named for the tempo rubato, which continued until 2003.

In 2017, Quilligan was elected to the Irish affiliation or academy of artists with a substantial body of work, Aosdána.

== Personal life ==
Quilligan's sister is Francesca "Zelda" Quilligan, also a dancer.
