= Listed buildings in Leeds (Chapel Allerton Ward) =

Chapel Allerton is a ward in the metropolitan borough of the City of Leeds, West Yorkshire, England. It contains 72 listed buildings that are recorded in the National Heritage List for England. Of these, one is listed at Grade II*, the middle of the three grades, and the others are at Grade II, the lowest grade. The ward is to the north of the centre of Leeds, and includes the areas of Chapel Allerton, Chapeltown, and Potternewton. Most of the listed buildings are houses and associated structures. The other listed buildings include churches, chapels and a synagogue, some of which have been converted for other uses, memorials in a graveyard, a packhorse bridge, public houses, a windmill converted into a house, former mill buildings, a former tannery converted for residential use, a school, public buildings, and two war memorials.

== Key ==
Grade	Criteria
II*	Particularly important buildings of more than special interest
II	Buildings of national importance and special interest

== Buildings ==
Name and location	Photograph	Date	Notes	Grade
Group of three gravestones, Old Graveyard; 53.82793°N 1.53532°W		Late 17th century	The gravestones are in gritstone, and consist of small shaped headstones. They are carved and decorated, and are some of the earliest surviving marked burials in the graveyard.	II
Packhorse bridge 53.82120°N 1.56167°W		Early 18th century	The packhorse bridge carries a footpath over Meanwood Beck. It is in stone and consists of a single round arch. The bridge has voussoirs, a low parapet, and a cobbled surface. To the southwest is a later canted abutment.	II
The Mustard Pot; 53.82919°N 1.54015°W		Early 18th century	A house and workshop, later a public house and restaurant, it is in red-brown brick with stone dressings, quoins, a moulded eaves cornice, and a stone slate roof. There are two storeys and both parts have five bays. The former house has a central doorway with a moulded architrave, a pulvinated frieze, and a pediment. The windows are sashes with flat heads and keystones. In the former workshop the windows have segmental-arched heads.	II
Scott Hall; 53.81679°N 1.54413°W		Mid 18th century	A house in brown brick with rusticated stone quoins, and a swept slate roof. There are three storeys and four bays. The windows are top-hung casements, those in the middle floor with segmental heads. At the rear is a tall round-headed stair window, and in the right return is a blocked loading door.	II
The Cottage; 53.82883°N 1.53473°W	—	Mid 18th century	A house that was later extended, it is in gritstone with quoins and paired gutter brackets. The original part has a stone slate roof, and the roof of the extension is in slate. There are two storeys and two bays, and a recessed bay on the right. The doorway has a pilastered architrave and a segmental pediment, and the windows are sashes.	II
Allerton Hall; 53.82907°N 1.54201°W		Late 18th century	A house that was later extended, it is in red brick with a hipped slate roof. There are two storeys and four bays, and the windows are sashes with flat-arched heads and keystones. To the left is a later three-storey projecting bay with a bowed front.	II
Newton Villa; 53.82764°N 1.54141°W		Late 18th century	A gritstone house with a sill band, a stone slate roof, and two storeys. There are three bays under a pedimented gable containing a Diocletian window. The central doorway has an architrave, a fanlight, and a cornice, and is flanked by canted bay windows. The upper floor contains sash windows.	II
Quarrie Dene; 53.82795°N 1.54137°W		Late 18th century	A stone house with a sill band, and a slate roof, hipped on the right. There are two storeys, a main range of three bays, and a recessed bay on the left. In the centre of the main range is a porch with Tuscan columns carrying an entablature, a cornice, and a blocking course. To its right is a rectangular bay window, to the left is a tripartite window, and the windows are sashes.	II
The Stables; 53.82921°N 1.53263°W		Late 18th century	The former stables and coach house to Chapel Allerton Hall, later converted for residential use, the building is in red brick with stone dressings and a grey slate roof. There are two storeys and eleven bays, the fourth and tenth bays projecting under pediments. These bays have carriage arches that are blocked and converted into windows, Venetian windows in the upper floor, and segmental recesses above. In the upper floor of the sixth and eighth bays are elliptical windows with keystones, and the other windows have flat heads and keystones.	II
The Round House; 53.82350°N 1.54825°W		Late 18th century	A tower windmill converted into a house, it is in gritstone, and has a parapet with wrought iron railing. There are four storeys, and tiers of windows on three sides, some with tie-stone jambs.	II
Rose Mount; 53.82768°N 1.53986°W		c. 1780	A house in red brick with a stone eaves cornice and a hipped blue slate roof. There are two storeys and five bays, the middle three bays projecting under a pediment, and a recessed bay on the right. In the centre is a porch with Tuscan columns, an entablature a cornice and a blocking course, and a doorway with pilasters. This is flanked by tall casement windows, and the other windows are sashes.	II
The Methodist Centre; 53.82908°N 1.53645°W		1794	A Sunday school, later used for other purposes, it is stone with a hipped slate roof, two storeys, and fronts of three and seven bays. In the centre of the entrance front are double doors approached by steps, and a porch with engaged Tuscan columns, and a moulded triangular pediment. At the top is a moulded eaves cornice and a moulded triangular pediment containing a circular inscribed plaque. The windows are round-headed, those in the ground floor at the front with aprons.	II
Boundary wall, 66, 68 and 70 Hen Conner Lane; 53.82738°N 1.54145°W		Late 18th to early 19th century	The wall enclosing the gardens is in gritstone with rounded coping. Its overall length is about 50 metres (160 ft), and it is between 2 metres (6 ft 7 in) and 3 metres (9.8 ft) high. The wall ramps up on the west side where it has flat coping.	II
Former spinning mill ranges, Carr Mills; 53.81610°N 1.54598°W		1810	The ranges, which have been converted for other uses, are in gritstone with stone slate roofs. There are two ranges at right angles forming an L-shaped plan. The larger range has five storeys and fronts of 14 and eight bays, and the other range has three storeys. The openings have plain surrounds, and the windows are 20th-century casements.	II
Potternewton Park Mansion; 53.82110°N 1.52362°W		c. 1817	A country house, later used for other purposes, it is in gritstone with sill bands, an eaves cornice, and a balustraded parapet containing an oval recess in the centre. There are two storeys and seven bays. In the centre is a semicircular portico with four Ionic columns carrying an entablature and a cornice, and with a wrought iron balcony. Above the portico is a tripartite sash window with an entablature and a cornice, and the other windows are sashes.	II
80 Harrogate Road, wall and gate 53.82776°N 1.53675°W		Early 19th century	A house that was extended later in the century, it is in red brick and has a slate roof with coped gables, and two storeys. The original range has moulded eaves gutters, and three bays, the middle bay projecting. In the centre are double doors with pilasters, a fanlight, an entablature, a cornice and a blocking course. To the left is a canted bay window, and the windows are sashes. The extension to the right is taller, with two bays, an eaves band, and sash windows, those in the upper floor with segmental heads. In front of the garden is a stone wall with rounded coping and square gate piers with moulded pyramidal caps.	II
150–170 Harrogate Road; 53.83078°N 1.53819°W		Early 19th century	A terrace of eleven gritstone houses with slate roofs. There are two storeys, and each house has two bays. The doorways have fanlights and corniced hoods on console brackets, and the windows are sashes. In No. 164 is a canted bay window.	II
198 and 200 Harrogate Road; 53.83208°N 1.53807°W		Early 19th century	A pair of mirror-image houses in a terrace, they are in gritstone with a first floor band, a slate roof, and two storeys. Each house has two bays and a central arched doorway with a fanlight, impost blocks, and a keystone. The windows are sashes.	II
210 Harrogate Road; 53.83251°N 1.53824°W		Early 19th century	A gritstone house in a terrace, with a sill band, eaves brackets, and a stone slate roof. There are two storeys and three bays. In the centre is a doorway with a fanlight, impost blocks, and a keystone. The windows are sashes.	II
212 Harrogate Road; 53.83259°N 1.53828°W		Early 19th century	A rendered house in a terrace, with paired eaves brackets, and a slate roof. There are two storeys and three bays. In the centre is a round-arched doorway with a moulded surround and a finial. To the right of the doorway is a canted bay window, and the other windows are sashes with moulded architraves and cambered heads.	II
214 and 216 Harrogate Road; 53.83267°N 1.53830°W		Early 19th century	A house, later divided into two, it is in gritstone with a sill band and a slate roof. There are two storeys and three bays. In the centre is a doorway in a round-arched double recess, with impost blocks, and a keystone. To the right, a window has been converted into a doorway, and a porch has been added. The windows are sashes.	II
218 and 218A Harrogate Road; 53.83274°N 1.53835°W		Early 19th century	A pair of gritstone houses in a terrace with a sill band, and a slate roof. There are two storeys and two bays. The paired doorways are in recessed surrounds, each with a fanlight, impost blocks, and a keystone. The windows are sashes, in the ground floor with wedge lintels.	II
226, 228 and 230 Harrogate Road; 53.83282°N 1.53854°W		Early 19th century	A house and shops at the end of a terrace, in gritstone with a floor band, a slate roof, hipped on the left, two storeys and a basement. In the centre is a doorway in a round-arched recess with a fanlight, impost blocks, and a keystone. The windows are sashes, in the ground floor with wedge lintels. In the ground floor of the left return, facing the road, are shop fronts, and sash windows above.	II
68 and 70 Hen Conner Lane; 53.82766°N 1.54159°W		Early 19th century	The former service wing of Newton Villa converted into two houses, they are in gritstone with a hipped slate roof. There are two storeys and four bays. The doorways have plain surrounds, and the sash windows have architraves, and some have mullions.	II
1 Norfolk Gardens and 58 Woodland Lane; 53.83006°N 1.53480°W		Early 19th century	A pair of gritstone houses with a hipped slate roof, and two storeys. Each house has three bays, and a central doorway with a semicircular fanlight. The left house has plate glass windows in moulded surrounds in the ground floor, and sash windows above. In the right house there is a bay window to the right of the doorway, and a window with a wedge lintel on the left, and the upper floor contains top-hung casements.	II
70 and 72 Potternewton Lane; 53.82527°N 1.53645°W		Early 19th century	A pair of cottages combined into one house, it is in gritstone, with a roof of concrete tile at the front and slate at the rear. There are two storeys and three bays. The doorway in the right bay has a quoined surround, and in the middle bay is a two-storey canted bay window.	II
80, 82 and 84 Potternewton Lane; 53.82522°N 1.53763°W		Early 19th century	A row of three red brick houses with a sill band, a modillion eaves cornice, and a tile roof. There are two storeys and basements, and each house has two bays, with a doorway in the right bay. The doorways have pilasters, fanlights, and cornices, and the windows are sashes.	II
90 and 92 Potternewton Lane; 53.82526°N 1.53860°W		Early 19th century	A pair of semi-detached houses with stone basements, red brick above, and a slate roof. The houses have flanking pilasters, a blocking course and a moulded cornice. There are two storeys, basements and attics, and each house has two bays, and a narrow outside bay containing the entrance. The windows are sashes.	II
Building near entrance, Carr Mills; 53.81587°N 1.54496°W		Early 19th century	A former mill building, it is in gritstone with a slate roof, two storeys and two bays. It contains an arched entrance converted into a window, and a blocked loading door in the upper floor.	II
Entrance range, Carr Mills; 53.81556°N 1.54517°W		Early 19th century	The mill building, later altered and usd for other purposes, is in gritstone with a stone slate roof. There are two storeys and five bays. The building contains a four-centred arch with voussoirs and impost blocks.	II
Gateway to Chapel Allerton Old Graveyard; 53.82785°N 1.53669°W		Early 19th century	The gateway is about 10 metres (33 ft) wide, it contains wrought iron gates and is flanked by railings on stone walls with moulded coping. The thickened standards form gate piers.	II
Glan Nua; 53.82528°N 1.53665°W		Early 19th century	A gritstone house with a slate roof, two storeys and three bays. The central doorway has a projecting surround, a traceried fanlight, and a cornice on console brackets. Above it is a sash window, and the outer bays contain two-storey canted bay windows.	II
Gledhow Mount Mansion; 53.82380°N 1.52557°W		Early 19th century	A country house, later used for other purposes, it is in stone with wide pilastered quoins, bands, an eaves cornice, a raised central panel, and a hipped slate roof. There are two storeys and five bays, the middle bay projecting slightly, and a three-bay rear wing on the left. In the centre is a Tuscan porch with an entablature and a cornice, and a doorway with a fanlight. The windows are sashes, the window above the doorway with an architrave, an entablature and a cornice.	II
Hawthorn House; 53.83012°N 1.53669°W		Early 19th century	A large rendered house with a sill band, a moulded eaves cornice, a blocking course, and a stone slate roof with coped gables. There are two storeys and a basement, and seven bays. The middle bay projects slightly and contains a doorway converted into a window with an architrave, and the windows are sashes with architraves. At the rear, facing the street, is a doorway with an architrave and a cornice in a round-arched recess.	II
Newton Terrace; 53.82772°N 1.53930°W		Early 19th century	A terrace of four red brick houses, the left house rendered, with roofs of slate or tile, and coped gables. There are two storeys and basements, the right house has three bays, and the others have two. Two houses have round-headed doorways with fanlights, the windows are sashes with wedge lintels, and at the rear are round-headed stair windows. To the right is a name plaque between the storeys.	II
Stratford House; 53.82868°N 1.53983°W	—	Early 19th century	A house that was later extended, and used for other purposes. It is in stone with sill bands, a cornice, and hipped slate roofs. The original block has three storeys and five bays, and is flanked by later two-storey wings. The central doorway has three-quarter Doric columns, an entablature, and a round-arched entrance. The windows are sashes, those in the ground floor with aprons.	II
Turnley House; 53.83217°N 1.53809°W	—	Early 19th century	A stone house in a terrace that has a slate roof with a coped gable on the right. There are two storeys and three bays. The central doorway has grooved pilasters, a fanlight with glazing bars in a pattern of linked circles, and a pediment. To the left is a bay window, to the right is a sash window, and in the upper floor are two-light casements.	II
98 Chapeltown Road; 53.81296°N 1.53317°W		c. 1834	A house later used for other purposes, it is in red brick with deep bracketed eaves, and a hipped slate roof. There are two storeys and cellars, and three bays. Steps with a low flanking walls lead up to a central doorway that has a portico of Tuscan columns supporting an entablature, a cornice and a blocking course. The windows are sashes.	II
Albion House; 53.81382°N 1.52575°W		c. 1835	A stone house, partly stuccoed, with a modillion cornice and blocking course, and a slate roof. There are two storeys and an attic, and a front of three bays, the middle bay projecting slightly with a cornice and parapet. The central doorway has engaged columns, a semicircular fanlight, and a pediment, and is flanked by single-storey semicircular bay windows. The central window in the upper floor has three lights, pilasters and a pediment, and the outer windows have moulded architraves.	II
Newton House; 53.81431°N 1.52566°W		c. 1835	A stone house with quoin pilasters, a cornice, a parapet, and a hipped slate roof. There are two storeys and five bays, the middle three bays projecting slightly. The central doorway has attached Tuscan columns and an entablature. The windows are sashes, those flanking the doorway in recessed elliptical arches.	II
Spencer House; 53.81403°N 1.52569°W	—	c. 1835	A stuccoed house with wide bracketed eaves and a slate roof. There are two storeys, and three bays, the middle bay bowed. The windows are casements.	II
Wall, gates and piers, Northern School of Contemporary Dance; 53.81330°N 1.53368°W		c. 1835 (probable)	The boundary wall is in gritstone, with flat coping on the west side, and rounded coping on the north and east sides. The gate piers are square, and the iron gates include a Star of David motif.	II
(former) Chapel Allerton Hospital; 53.82524°N 1.52958°W		1835–40	A house, Gledhow Grove, at one time used as a hospital, it is in stone on a plinth, with quoin pilasters, a sill band, and a hipped slate roof, and is in Greek Revival style. There are two storeys and three wide bays, two rear wings, and a four-storey tower. The middle bay projects under a pediment and contains pilasters, two giant Ionic columns in antis, and double doors with an architrave and a fanlight with roundels. The windows are sashes with architraves, and in the right return is a three-light bow window.	II
Gateway and boundary wall, Chapel Allerton Hospital; 53.82485°N 1.53150°W	—	c. 1835	The gateway is in gritstone and contains wrought iron gates. The piers flank archways, and have niches, friezes with paterae, and pedimented caps. The wall extends to the north for about 160 metres (520 ft), and is about 2 metres (6 ft 7 in) high. At the north end are tapering piers with flat segmental faced capstones.	II
Stables, Chapel Allerton Hospital; 53.82580°N 1.53057°W		1835–40	The stables, coach house and cottage are in stone and red brick with slate roofs. In the centre is a flat archway under a flat-roofed tower with moulded angles, and a round-arched recess containing a clock face. This is flanked by gabled wings containing doorways, windows and pedimented dormers.	II
Tomb of John Hives, Old Graveyard; 53.82785°N 1.53504°W		1843	The tomb is in gritstone and in the form of a Roman altar. It has a moulded plinth, a dado with inscriptions, a Doric frieze with guttae, triglyphs and paterae, a dentilled cornice, and a top slab with scrolled ends. The tomb is surrounded by a kerb and the remains of wrought iron railings.	II
Former lodge to Newton Hall, gate piers and wall 53.82182°N 1.53278°W		1856	The former lodge is in stone on a plinth, with a string course and band, and a slate roof with coped gables and vase and ball finials. There is one storey and a cellar, and fronts of one and two bays. The north front contains a doorway with a moulded round arch and a mullioned sash window, above which is a date plaque, and a decorative round panel in the gable. The front facing the road has similar windows, a circular panel in the gable, and a round-arched dormer. Running along the roadside are walls containing gate piers with a square section, each on a moulded plinth, with a cornice and a capstone.	II
1–4 Newton Grove; 53.81796°N 1.53072°W		1860–70	A terrace of four gritstone houses with a slate roof. There are three storeys and basements, and each house has three bays. Nos. 1, 2 and 3 have porches approached by steps with Tuscan columns, an entablature, a cornice and a blocking course, and canted bay windows. The doorway of No. 4 is approached by steps with original wrought iron handrails, and has a moulded surround, a semicircular fanlight with a keystone, and a cornice on consoles. The windows are sashes with architraves.	II
5 Newton Grove; 53.81800°N 1.53026°W		1860–70	A stone house, later used for other purposes, it has corner pilasters, a moulded eaves band, a cornice, and a slate roof. There are two storeys, an attic and a cellar, and a symmetrical front of three bays. Steps lead up to the central doorway that has pilasters, and a pediment containing a name plate on console brackets, flanked by canted bay windows with mullions, a cornice and a blocking course. Above the doorway is a sash window in a segmental-arched architrave with a triangular pediment, and the outer window have paired round-arched lancets with segmental pediments. At the top is a moulded pediment containing a Venetian window with an open pediment.	II
6, 7 and 8 Newton Grove; 53.81803°N 1.52982°W		1860–70	A row of three stone houses that have a slate roof with a coped gable on the left. There are three storeys and basements, and all the houses have three bays. Steps lead up to the doorway of No. 6 that has a semicircular fanlight, moulded imposts, a keystone, and a cornice on console brackets. The windows are sashes, those in the lower two floors with architraves, segmental heads and keystones. Nos. 7 and 8 are lower and have sill bands, and a moulded eaves cornice. Steps lead up to porches, each with Tuscan columns, an entablature, a cornice and a blocking course. To the right of each porch is a canted bay window, and in the upper floors are sash windows in architraves.	II
9–12 Newton Grove; 53.81806°N 1.52947°W		1860–70	A row of four stone houses that have a slate roof with a coped gable on the right. There are three storeys and basements, and all the houses have three bays. Nos. 9, 10 and 11 have sill bands. In each house, steps lead up to a round-arched porch that has moulded imposts, a keystone, rusticated pilasters, a balustrade and a cornice. The windows are sashes, those in the lower two floors with architraves. No. 12 is taller, and has chamfered quoins, a doorway with a moulded surround, a fanlight, and a cornice on consoles. To its right is a canted bay windows with a dentilled cornice. The windows in the upper floor have architraves and keystones.	II
Sugarwell Court; 53.81872°N 1.55130°W		1866	A tannery, later converted for residential use, it is in sandstone, rusticated in the lower floors, on a plinth, with a modillion cornice between the top floor, and a slate roof There are three storeys and a part basement, and two ranges at right angles with 24 and 23 bays. In the entrance range is a wide round-arched carriage entry, with piers flanked by colonnettes with large capitals, a moulded archivolt with a dated keystone. The windows in the lower floors have moulded sills and camber-arched lintels divided by pilasters. In the top floor, also divided by pilasters, the windows have segmental-arched heads.	II
Railings, gate piers and gate, Sugarwell Court; 53.81833°N 1.55122°W		1866 (probable)	Enclosing the grounds are low rusticated sandstone walls with chamfered coping, and iron railings. At the gateway are square stone piers, each on a plinth, with colonnettes at the angles, and a swept domed cap. The gates are in iron, with wide carriage gates and a pedestrian gate.	II
Chapel Allerton Primary School; 53.82696°N 1.53722°W		1878	The school is in red brick with stone dressings and a slate roof with steep gables, shaped kneelers and vase finials. There is one storey and a basement, and a U-shaped plan, with seven bays, the outer bays projecting and gabled. On the front are three entrances, the main entrance with a pinnacled dormer. The windows are mullioned and transomed, and in the left bay is a large stone plaque with lettering and carved decoration.	II
Railings and gate piers, Chapel Allerton Primary School; 53.82707°N 1.53655°W		1878	On three sides of the playground, and dividing it, are red brick walls with stone coping, and wrought iron railings and gates. There are two sets of square stone gate piers about 3.5 metres (11 ft) high. Each pier has a deep plinth, a chamfered shaft, and a large gabled capstone with cusped recesses.	II
St Martin's Church, Potternewton; 53.82193°N 1.53366°W		1879–81	The church was designed by Adams & Kelly in Decorated style, and the steeple was started in 1898, but not completed. The church is built in stone with a slate roof, and consists of a nave with a clerestory, north and south aisles, north and south porches, a chancel and vestry, and a west tower. The tower has angle buttresses, a four-light west window, two-light belfry windows, and a shallow pyramidal roof. At the east end is a seven-light window, gabled buttresses surmounted by crocketed pinnacles, and uncarved gargoyle projections.	II
Former Union Chapel; 53.81997°N 1.53213°W		1877	The chapel is in gritstone with a slate roof. At the front is a projecting gabled porch containing double arches flanked by angle buttresses with crocketed spires. The angled walls on each side have windows with four-centred arches, over which is a decorative frieze. From the porch, flying buttresses link with a lantern at the rear that has three gabled faces. Behind the lantern is a square tower and short gabled transepts. The tower has clock faces on all sides, and crocketed pinnacles at the corners.	II
Former Baptist School; 53.81810°N 1.55055°W		1881	The school, later used for other purposes, is in red brick and terracotta, with a hipped slate roof. There is one storey and a basement. The front facing the road has a pediment with ornamentation in the tympanum, under which is a dentilled cornice and a frieze with Greek key decoration. Flanking the entrance are pairs of moulded fluted pilasters, and an architrave, and above is a lettered frieze. Along the sides are five tall round-headed windows with architraves, and the end bay projects.	II
St Matthew's Church, Chapel Allerton; 53.83175°N 1.54112°W		1897–99	The church was designed by G. F. Bodley in Gothic Revival style, It is built in Bath stone and Ancaster stone with a tile roof. The church consists of a nave and chancel under one roof, north and south aisles, north vestries, and a detached porch tower at the southwest connected to the body of the church by a low passage. The tower has narrow buttresses, a staircase turret, a belfry stage with clock faces, and an embattled parapet.	II*
Church of the Three Hierarchs; 53.81837°N 1.52050°W		1902	A Methodist church, later Greek Orthodox, it is in gritstone with a slate roof, and in Gothic Revival style. The front facing the road is gabled, with a recessed arch containing a three-light stepped window and corner turrets. Flanking this are entrances with projecting gabled porches. On the left is a three-stage tower with angle buttresses, an open belfry with a crocketed finial, surmounted by a small spire with a finial. On the right is a pyramidal roof with a finial, and at the rear is a Sunday school.	II
St Martin's Institute; 53.82159°N 1.53362°W		1902	The hall is in gritstone with a slate roof, and is in Perpendicular style. There are two storeys and seven bays. At the entrance is a single-storey porch containing three arches with ogee-shaped hood moulds, and a decorated frieze. Above the porch is a large seven-light window flanked by bays with stepped parapets and pyramidal roofs. Along the sides are mullioned and transomed windows, those in the upper floor with segmental heads.	II
Webton Court; 53.83113°N 1.53212°W		1902–03	The house has a ground floor in gritstone, timber framing in the upper floor at the front, tile hanging elsewhere, and tile roofs. It has a chamfered plinth and two storeys. At the front is a central range and projecting cross-wings, the upper storey is jettied, and there is a recessed wing on the right. The central range has a segmental-headed doorway and casement windows. In the left wing is a bay window, the right wing contains a cross mullioned window, and in both wings are oriel windows.	II
Gledhow Manor; 53.82969°N 1.52974°W		1903	A large house in red brick on a stone plinth, with stone dressings, quoins, a modillion eaves cornice, and a hipped roof of red slate. There are two storeys, a front of three wide bays, and a rear wing on the left. In the centre is a semicircular portico with paired Ionic columns, a doorway and flanking windows, all with semicircular fanlights. The upper floor contains small-paned casement windows with architraves and keystones. In the outer bays are two-storey canted bay windows.	II
Boundary wall and gate piers, Gledhow Manor; 53.82909°N 1.52989°W	—	1903	The wall is in gritstone with flat copings, it is about 80 metres (260 ft) long, and it contains inner and outer pairs of gate piers. The piers have a square section and are about 2 metres (6 ft 7 in) high. Each pier has a plinth, two bands, a cornice and a rounded shallow pyramidal capstone.	II
Stables and cottage range, Gledhow Manor; 53.82983°N 1.52898°W	—	c. 1903	The stables, coach house and cottage are in brick, the upper part rendered, with stone dressings, a moulded string course, modillion eaves cornices, and a hipped grey tile roof. The buildings form an L-shaped plan with one storey and attics, consisting of a two-bay cottage, a recessed bay with a carriage arch, stabling, a cottage with an angled entrance, and a projecting two-bay coach house range. Features include a wide round-headed carriage arch with a moulded surround, windows with segmental heads, and a louvred ventilator.	II
Chapel Allerton Library and Police Station; 53.82875°N 1.53762°W		1904	A group of buildings on a corner site, they are in gritstone with slate roofs, two storeys and attics. On the right, facing Harrogate Road, is the library with three bays, two shaped gables containing oval windows, obelisk finials, and a round-arched doorway. To the left is the former police house, with three bays and a central doorway. On the corner is the former police station, with two gabled bays, a curved bay on the corner containing a round-arched doorway, and two bays facing Town Street, Beyond that is a fire station with five bays, the left bay taller and gabled, containing a large entrance. On the roof is a ventilator in the form of an ogee-domed cupola.	II
Hillcrest Primary School, walls, railings and gates 53.81479°N 1.52655°W		1906	The school is in red brick with stone dressings and slate roofs. It consists of two buildings, the south building with two and three storeys and a front of three bays with shaped pediments, and corner turrets with domed roofs, and a rear building with a single storey. The south front has corner pilasters, a modillion eaves cornice, and carved stone plaques. The entrance has a projecting porch with columns and ball finials. The boundary is enclosed by a low brick wall with railings and square gate piers with ball finials, and the gateway has a flat arch and a segmental pediment.	II
St Matthew's Parish Hall; 53.83029°N 1.53559°W		1912	The hall, later used for other purposes, is in red brick with stone dressings, and a roof of Westmorland slate with coped gables. There is one storey, a main range of five bays, lower recessed flanking wings and a rear wing. The main range has corner buttresses, each with a cap and an urn, and in the centre of the roof is a square cupola with a lead roof and a weathervane. Both flanking wings have circular windows, the left wing contains the main entrance with a moulded surround and a three-light fanlight, and the right wing contains a simple doorway. The other windows in all parts are cross casements.	II
Corbie Steps; 53.82140°N 1.52232°W		1914	A stone house with a pantile roof, two storeys and an attic, and a cruciform plan. On the south front is a projecting wing with a crow-stepped and coped gable. It contains a round-headed porch with a canted oriel bay window to the right, and above are mullioned casement windows. The east front has a projecting gabled wing containing a two-storey canted bay window.	II
War memorial, Old Graveyard; 53.82823°N 1.53734°W		c. 1920	The war memorial at the entrance to the Old Churchyard is in stone. It has a high chamfered plinth, a tapered shaft, and a cross with a small crucifix on the west side. On the plinth are plaques with inscriptions and the names of those lost in the two World Wars. Flanking the memorial are railings and a gate.	II
War memorial, St Martin's Church; 53.82184°N 1.53338°W		c. 1920	The memorial is in the churchyard to the south of the chancel, and is in gritstone. It has an octagonal base, on which is a tapering shaft and a floriate cross on an octagonal plinth. There is carving on the shaft, and the base has recessed panels, the front panel with an inscription.	II
Northern School of Contemporary Dance; 53.81321°N 1.53332°W		1929–32	Originally a synagogue, the building is in red-brown brick, the entrance in Portland stone, with some concrete, copper domes, and wrought iron grills. At the main entrance steps lead up to a portico with vases and paired columns with tulip capitals. There is a massive central dome, a lower dome at the east end, and smaller domes over the west entrance.	II
