= Peter Tranchell =

British composer

Peter Andrew Tranchell (14 July 1922 – 14 September 1993) was a British composer.

== Life and career ==
Tranchell was born in Cuddalore, India, on 14 July 1922, and educated at the Dragon School, Oxford, Clifton College and King's College, Cambridge. During the Second World War he served, like his father, Col. H G Tranchell, in the Indian Army, after which he resumed his Cambridge studies, changing from exhibitioner in Classics to Music.

He was Lecturer in Music at the University of Cambridge from 1950 to 1989, and Fellow and Director of Studies in music at Gonville and Caius College from 1960 to 1989. As Praecentor of the college (following the retirement of Patrick Hadley) he directed the chapel choir. He died on 14 September 1993 near his home in Curdridge near Botley in Hampshire.

His compositions included the opera The Mayor of Casterbridge (1951), church music and instrumental works such as the Organ Sonata. He was also a composer of light music, including vocal "entertainments", dramatic cantatas such as The Mating Season (based on P. G. Wodehouse), and musical comedies such as Zuleika (after Max Beerbohm), produced in Cambridge in 1954 and revived in 1957. His archive is kept at Cambridge University Library.

== Titus Oates Society ==
Amongst other activities at Caius, Tranchell became the patron, at the request of, predominantly, members of the college choir, of a dining society at Caius named the Titus Oates Society as a sort of antidote to other college clubs. He was asked by those wishing to form another dining club for a suitable name and suggested, with his frequent cheekiness, that of the most reprehensible member of Caius thitherto: Titus Oates.

The dinners – dinners on the last day of Full Term in the first two academic terms and a picnic, normally watching the Bumps on the Saturday after the last – known as "Exceedings", were marked by exemplary food and drink from the college's kitchen staff (whom he held in the highest regard) and cellars and ran to some nine or so courses. In 1983, the cost was £17. This was a deliberate policy of Tranchell's to ensure that the cost would not bar anyone. This accords with Tranchell's sense of egalitarianism recorded in his descriptions of his time in the Indian Army. The dinners included various toasts: to Titus Oates, to a saint of the day – preceded by an entertaining biography of each – and to The Queen.

The Titus Oates Society ran from the early 1970s until around the early 1990s, the patronage having been passed to other Fellows of the college on Tranchell's retirement in 1989.

== Selected works ==
=== Ballets ===
- Falstaff (1950)
- Fate's Revenge (1951), performed by Ballet Rambert at the Lyric, Hammersmith
- Spring Legend (1957), commissioned by Cambridge Ballet Workshop
- Images of Love, (1964) produced at Covent Garden with choreography by Kenneth MacMillan

=== Operas and musicals ===
- The Mayor of Casterbridge (1951)
- Zuleika (1954)
- Murder in the Towers, "detective cantata" (1955, revised 1986)
- The Mating Season (1962)
- Thackeray Ditties (1962)
- His First Mayweek (1963)
- The Robot Emperor (1965)

=== Incidental music ===
- Johnson over Jordan (J. B. Priestley; 1947)
- Macbeth (William Shakespeare; 1949)
- The Merchant of Venice (Shakespeare; 1950)

=== Concert works ===
- Nativitates for organ (1943)
- Variations for String Quartet (1949)
- Organ Sonata (1950)
- Sonatina for Flute and Piano (1966)
- Festive Overture (1966)
- Movements, chamber ensemble (1987)

=== Choral works ===
- Oh That Our Faith, anthem (1971)
- Te Deum in E (1974)
- This Sorry Scheme of Things (1953)
- The Joyous Year (1961)
- If ye would hear the angels sing (1965)
- St Michael's Mass (1965, revised version 1988)

=== Hymn tunes ===
- Morestead. Text "The Fullness of the Earth is God's Alone" (Kaan)
- Swanmore. Text "The Earth The Sky The Oceans" (Kaan)
- Droxford. Text "God gave to Man to have and hold" (Kaan)
- Durley. Text: "Thank you O Lord" (Kaan)

(These were published in Pilgrim Praise Music Edition, 1972 by Fred Kaan, published by Stainer & Bell)

- Wish Road. Text "Lord, dismiss us with thy blessing" (written for Eastbourne College)
