= Mari Bicknell =

Mari Scott Bicknell MBE (née Henderson; 1 February 1914 – 15 March 2003) was founder and director of Cambridge Ballet Workshop, a dance company that taught generations of young ballet dancers.

Born Mari Scott Henderson in Kensington, London, Bicknell began her career studying with Vera Trefilova in Paris, and later with Tamara Karsavina. She later danced with Sadler's Wells Ballet. In 1936, after her marriage to the architect Peter Bicknell, she began teaching ballet in Cambridge to young dancers aged from 10 to 20 years old.

In 1950 Britten's Let's Make an Opera inspired her to create Let's Make a Ballet for her most talented students. The first performance took place at her home, Finella, in Cambridge in 1950, performed by a cast of dancers all under the age of 13. George ("Dadie") Rylands saw this production and suggested that she staged her ballets at the Cambridge Arts Theatre. In 1952 Mari Bicknell presented a programme of three ballets there: Dream Street, Elsie Piddock and The Happy Prince. Her fledgling company, Let's Make a Ballet, eventually became The Cambridge Ballet Workshop in 1968.

After a season at the Lyric, Hammersmith (1961), from 1965 she based her productions for 20 years at the Theatre Royal, Bury St Edmunds, later adding a winter season in Cambridge (staged at the Mumford Theatre, CCAT). In 1977 the company took part in the Three Choirs Festival by appearing at the Swan Theatre, Worcester, presenting a Homage to Britten programme.

Cambridge Ballet Workshop was a company rather than a dance school. Aged from five to 21, the 30 to 40 dancers were drawn from around 300 who attended her classes. One well-known alumna was Gill Clarke.

Several original scores were commissioned specially for ballets created and performed by the company, including from the composers Joseph Horovitz (Les Rats, 1955; Through the Looking Glass, 1968), Peter Tranchell (Spring Legend, 1957), Geoffrey Wright (Love of Seven Dolls, 1960; The Canterville Ghost, 1979), Roger Vignoles – who also was a pianist for several productions (Six Characters in Search of a Choreographer, 1965), Hugh MacDonald (The Wedding, 1966) and Madeleine Dring (The Real Princess, 1971).

Mari Bicknell gave her farewell season as director of the company in 1980. She was made MBE in 1986.
