= Christopher Bannerman =

British choreographer

Christopher Bannerman is a British academic, choreographer, and former dancer. He is professor of dance and head of the School of Dance at Middlesex University.

Bannerman started his career with the National Ballet of Canada but left in the 1970s to travel in south Asia.

He worked with London Contemporary Dance Theatre as a principal dancer and choreographer for 15 years.

Bannerman has been head of the School of Dance at Middlesex University since 1992, and professor of dance since November 1992. He is a visiting professor at Beijing Dance Academy.
