= Robert Cohan =

British-American dancer (1925–2021)

Sir Robert Cohan CBE
- Born: 26 March 1925; New York City, U.S.
- Died: 13 January 2021 (aged 95); London, England
- Citizenship: United Kingdom; United States
- Occupations: Dancer; choreographer
- Known for: Founding artistic director of The Place, London Contemporary Dance School and London Contemporary Dance Theatre
- Parents: Walter Cohan (father); Rebecca 'Billie' Osheyack (mother)
- Relatives: Dorothy (sister)

Sir Robert Paul Cohan CBE (26 March 1925 – 13 January 2021) was a British dancer, choreographer, and the founding artistic director of The Place, London Contemporary Dance School, and London Contemporary Dance Theatre (LCDT), which he directed for 20 years. Cohan also worked with the Yorke Dance Project and the Batsheva Dance Company in Israel.

== Life and career ==
Robert Cohan was born in New York City to a Jewish family. His family has said that while he was born late on 26 March 1925, his birth certificate inaccurately listed him as being born on 27 March, and he celebrated his birthday across both days.

Cohan served in the US Navy in World War II, and while on leave he saw a performance of Robert Helpmann's Miracle in the Gorbals by Sadler's Wells Ballet in London in 1944. Cohan joined Martha Graham's company (the Martha Graham Dance Company) in 1946, becoming one of her regular partners on stage and later a teacher in her dance school. He left in 1957 but came back in 1962, rising to co-director in 1966. He left in 1969 to launch the London Contemporary Dance Group, based at the Adeline Genée Theatre in East Grinstead, having already launched The Place in London in 1967.

In 1989 Cohan retired, though he did work intermittently. Cohan lived in France.

He was knighted in the 2019 Birthday Honours for services to dance.

Cohan died in London on 13 January 2021, at age 95.

== Publications ==
- The Dance Workshop, Gaia Books Ltd, 1989, ISBN 978-0-04-790010-5
