= One Dance UK =

- Formation: 1982
- Type: NGO
- Legal status: Registered charity
- Purpose: Advocacy
- Headquarters: Dance Hub; Thorp St; Birmingham; B5 4TP
- Location: Birmingham
- Members: 1,500
- Official language: English
- Chair: Amanda Skoog
- Chief Executive: Andrew Hurst MBE
- Main organ: Board of trustees
- Website: www.onedanceuk.org
- Formerly called: Association of Dance of the African Diaspora, Dance UK, National Dance Teachers Association, Youth Dance England

One Dance UK is the national body for dance in the UK, formed by the merger of Association of Dance of the African Diaspora (ADAD), Dance UK (founded by dancers such as Gill Clarke), National Dance Teachers Association (NDTA) and Youth Dance England. The organisation represents dancers at all levels of the dance industry, and champions excellence in education, youth dance, dance of the African diaspora, performance, health and well-being, management, leadership and career development.

== Healthier Dancer Programme ==
One Dance UK's Healthier Dancer Programme works to improve the physical and psychological health and well-being of dancers through providing advice and information on health, fitness and injury prevention for dancers, both for recreational dancers and for those in vocational training and working professionally. The organisation holds regular events for dance professionals, healthcare practitioners and scientists in order to share current research on dance health.

One Dance UK operates the Healthcare Practitioners Directory, a UK wide database of medical practitioners and complementary therapists with experience of working with dancers.

One Dance UK also advocates for improved healthcare for dancers, and along with the National Institute of Dance Medicine and Science, was a key organisation involved in the creation of NHS dance injury clinics, located at the Royal Orthopaedic Hospital, Queen Elizabeth Hospital Birmingham and Royal United Hospital Bath.

== Merger ==
On 26 March 2015 Dance UK announced that it had received three-year funding from Arts Council England to merge with Association of Dance of the African Diaspora, National Dance Teachers Association and Youth Dance England to create a unified "go-to" industry body that would become the subject association for dance in schools in the UK.

The name of the new organisation, One Dance UK, as well its new website were launched 7 December 2015 at the Royal Society of Medicine at an event attended by approximately 450 dance professionals.

The merger came into effect on 1 April 2016.

== Relocation ==
In 2019 One Dance UK relocated from their offices in London to a new site in Birmingham. Housed within the Birmingham Hippodrome campus, the One Dance UK offices sit within the newly opened Dance Hub space which has been built on top of the existing structure which houses Birmingham Royal Ballet, FABRIC Dance and Birmingham Hippodrome.

== Awards ==
One Dance UK holds an annual awards event "to unite, celebrate, acknowledge and reward the people who have made an impact on the vibrant UK dance landscape".

As of 2025 there are 11 awards:

- Health and Wellbeing in Dance Award
- Research in Dance Award
- Young People’s Dance Champion Award
- Community Champion Award
- The Dance Spotlight Award
- The Dance Changemaker Award
- The Green Dance Award
- Artistic Innovation in Dance Award
- People’s Choice Award
- The Bob Lockyer Award for Digital Innovation, in honour of Bob Lockyer OBE, (1942-2022)
- The Jane Attenborough Award, in honour of Jane Attenborough (1955-2004), founding director of Dance UK
