= Thea Nerissa Barnes =

American dancer

Thea Nerissa Barnes (2 February 1952 – 28 December 2018) was a dancer, choreographer and teacher.

== Early life ==
Thea Nerissa Barnes was born in Columbus, Georgia, on 2 February 1952. She grew up on Chicago's South Side and attended Calumet High School. She showed an interest in dance from an early age.

== Career ==
After moving to New York, she achieved a Bachelor of Arts in dance from the Juilliard School and a master's degree in Dance Education from Columbia Teachers College. She studied at Arthur Mitchell's Dance Theatre of Harlem after winning a scholarship and was trained in a variety of techniques with practitioners in the field including Igor Schwezoff and DanceAfrica founder Chuck Davis.

She began her professional career with the Alvin Ailey American Dance Theater (1972) and later became a principal dancer with the Martha Graham Dance Company from 1979; she stayed for ten years. She toured worldwide and during her career danced with a number of dance companies including the Julian Swain Inner City Dance Theatre in Chicago as a soloist and guest performer. She performed on Broadway, in film and on television and venues included Metropolitan Museum of Art and Palais Garnier in Paris.

In 1992, she moved to London to teach at the Laban Centre for Movement and Dance, transferring to Phoenix Dance Theatre and becoming its artistic director in 1997. Between 2001 and 2018, she was resident dance supervisor for the West End production of The Lion King.

Described by Associate Newspapers as "a truly beautiful and expressive dancer", Barnes was praised for inspiring and nurturing black performers both in the US and the UK. She died on 28 December 2018 in Chicago.
