= Studio Lenca =

Contemporary artist from El Salvador

Studio Lenca is a UK based contemporary artist from El Salvador. The artist explores themes of identity, belonging and migration. Born in La Paz, El Salvador Studio Lenca now lives and works in Margate, UK

== Early life and education ==
Studio Lenca, also known as Jose Campos, was born in La Paz El Salvador in 1986. After travelling illegally to the USA he grew up in San Francisco, California. Studio Lenca attended San Francisco School of the Arts, now known as The Ruth Asawa San Francisco School of the Arts. In 2013, Studio Lenca attended The London Contemporary Dance School, he was the first person in his immediate family to attend university. In 2019, Studio Lenca graduated from the MA in Arts and Learning at Goldsmiths, University of London.

== Career ==
Studio Lenca's work has been acquired by several museums and institutions including the Pérez Art Museum in Miami and The Parrish Art Museum, New York His work explores the displaced narrative drawing on his own experience of leaving El Salvador during the country's civil war.

In 2020 Studio Lenca was the winner of the Photo Fringe OPEN20 SOLO with his photography work exploring Historiantes, folkloric dancers from El Salvador. This body of work was also shown at Sierra Metro Gallery in Edinburgh

In 2022 Studio Lenca held a solo exhibition at Foundry Dubai, entitled Dreamers- which included paintings and photography. Later that year the artist held a solo exhibition at Soho Revue Gallery, A Losing Game.

In the artist's installation 'Chisme' the artist created wooden cut-out figures made in collaboration with immigrant workers and was the subject of an exhibition at the gallery in 2023. which was acquired by The Parrish Art Museum.

Studio Lenca was interviewed by Russel Tovey and Robert Diament on the TalkArt Podcast

In 2023, Studio Lenca was featured in the Evening Standard on the New Art Power List for 2023, other artists featured included Heather Agyepong and Katy Hessel.

The Latin American Fashion Awards commissioned Studio Lenca to create the official trophy for the event in 2023. In the inaugural year the trophy was awarded to J Balvin (who was awarded the Latin Fashion Icon of the Year), other winners included Willy Chavarría, Karoline Vitto and Luar's Raúl López

The artist's show 'Leave to Remain' at Carl Freedman Gallery included an installation of sculptures made in collaboration with Kent Refugee Action Network (KRAN). Entitled 'Dreamland' the work consisted of 3 large colourful volcano-like sculptures made with young refugees and asylum seekers living in Kent, UK. The title of the show 'Leave to Remain' comes from the term used by the UK Home Office for the immigration status which grants permission to stay in the UK.

In 2024, it was announced that Studio Lenca had been selected for El Museo del Barrio's Triennial. The museum show is curated by El Museo's chief curator Rodrigo Moura and curator Susanna V. Temkin, and guest curator María Elena Ortiz. Studio Lenca's work will be exhibited alongside Karyn Olivier, Norberto Roldan, Carmen Argote and Liz Cohen.

Studio Lenca made his curatorial debut in 2025 with the exhibition Leave to Remain at Kates-Ferri Projects in New York. The show featured works from Salvadoran artists including John Rivas, Simon Vega and Marta Torres.

It was announced in 2025 that Studio Lenca was selected for Un-monument | Re-monument | De-monument by The City of Boston, a major public art commission in celebration of Boston’s 250th Anniversary, part of a series of new public art projects planned to expand inclusive histories across the city.

Studio Lenca was selected by luxury fashion brand Hermès in 2025 to create a kinetic art installation at their flagship Bond Street Store- the installation was entitled 'A line in motion'.

=== Individual exhibitions ===
A selection of Studio Lenca's solo exhibitions

- Leave to Remain, Carl Freedman Gallery, Margate (2024)
- Chisme, Parrish Art Museum, New York (2023)
- Alquimia, Fina Cortesin, Malaga (2023)
- El Jardin, Tang Contemporary, Bangkok(2022)
- Cutting Through, Edji, Brussels (2023)
- Listo, Halsey Mckay, New York (2023)
- Ni de aquí, ni de allá, Untitled Art Fair, Miami (2022)
- A Losing Game, Soho Revue, London (2022)
- I’m working on leaving, Tang Contemporary, Seoul (2022)
- The Dreamers, Foundry, Dubai (2022)
