= Peter Bicknell =

British architect

Peter Bicknell (16 June 1907 – 31 May 1995) was a British architect, author, exhibition curator and mountaineer. He practised as an architect in Cambridge with H. C. Hughes as Hughes and Bicknell, including commissions for the University of Cambridge and its colleges, notably Fen Court at Peterhouse (1939) and an extension to the Scott Polar Research Institute (1968), as well as commercial buildings and private houses. His designs were predominantly Modernist in style. He lectured in architecture and art history at the Cambridge School of Architecture, and was a fellow of Downing College.

In the 1980s, after retiring from his architectural practice, Bicknell curated art history exhibitions at the Fitzwilliam Museum in Cambridge and elsewhere. As a mountaineer, he is remembered for his 1932 traverse of the Cuillin Ridge on Skye in just over 8 hours. His books include British Hills and Mountains (1947) and Picturesque Scenery of the Lake District 1752–1855 (1990).

== Early life and education ==
Peter Bicknell was born on 16 June 1907 in Rowland Gills, County Durham, to Phillis (née Lovibond; 1877–1957) and Raymond Bicknell (1875–1927). His father was the director of Newcastle Breweries and a noted amateur mountaineer. He had an older sister and two younger brothers. He attended Oundle School, Northamptonshire, and then read architecture at Jesus College, Cambridge from 1926.

== Hughes and Bicknell architectural practice ==
Bicknell returned to Cambridge in 1935 to practise as an architect as the junior partner of Henry Castree Hughes (1893–1976). Many of Hughes and Bicknell's commissions were in Cambridge, including projects for the university and colleges, commercial buildings and private houses. Their works were mainly Modernist in style, which was unusual in Cambridge before the Second World War. Notable examples include Fen Court, Peterhouse (1939), described in its grade II listing as "the only pre-war Cambridge college accommodation building in the International Modern style and the forerunner to other college buildings constructed at both Oxford and Cambridge after the war"; as well as an extension to the Scott Polar Research Institute (1968). Commercial buildings include Essex House on Regent Street (1936) and 31–39 Fitzroy Street (1959–60). On a smaller scale, the house Bicknell designed for himself and his wife on Newton Road is described by Janet Adam Smith as a "small masterpiece" with a "cunning design" integrating the garden with the building to make it appear to be located in the countryside.

Other projects within the county include works for the Dean and Chapter of Ely Cathedral and for The King's School in Ely. Hughes and Bicknell was also employed as executant architects for the American Cemetery, near Madingley. Further afield, their commissions include projects for the Wildfowl Trust at Slimbridge, Gloucestershire, including building Scott House (mid-1950s) for the conservationist Peter Scott, a friend of Bicknell's, which Bicknell also extended in around 1977 with an observation tower. Other Hughes and Bicknell projects outside Cambridgeshire include a cricket pavilion at Oundle School, Northamptonshire, and a housing estate at Hilgay, Norfolk. Bicknell also built a house in Brigsteer in the Lake District for his sister Ellen.

== Academia ==
Bicknell was an academic at the University of Cambridge's School of Architecture, where he lectured in architecture and art history, and also served as secretary to the Faculty of Fine Arts. Andrew Saint describes him as "one of the school's stalwart local practitioner–teachers" and, with David Roberts, as "the backbone of the post-war generation of teachers". He was knowledgeable about architectural history, following studies with Edward Prior and Geoffrey Webb, and studied contemporary and historical architectural styles in Britain and elsewhere. He was a fellow of Downing College.

== Exhibitions ==
In 1981, around the time of his retirement from architectural practice, Bicknell curated an exhibition at the Fitzwilliam Museum in Cambridge, and wrote its catalogue. Entitled "Beauty, Horror and Immensity – Picturesque Landscape in Britain 1750–1850", the exhibition focused on the Lake District. The nucleus of the exhibition was Bicknell's extensive personal collection of 18th- and 19th-century guidebooks and artworks on the Lakes – described by the art historian John Gage as "exceptionally fine" – which he had just donated to King's College. In a review for Burlington Magazine, Gage appreciates the inclusion of such unusual items as a Claude glass, headed hotel notepaper and a children's game, and praises the "instructive" placement of initial sketches together with the final print.

The success of this venture led to what his Times obituary describes as a "rewarding second career" in museum and bibliographic work, relating to his passion for depictions of mountain landscapes in art. Several further art history exhibitions followed during the 1980s, at the Fitzwilliam and at Grasmere in the Lake District, in collaboration with Robert Woof and Jane Munro. He also co-organised an exhibition of books and artworks for the Alpine Club (1981). He edited the Illustrated Wordsworth Guide (1984) and compiled the bibliography Picturesque Scenery of the Lake District 1752–1855 (1990), which established itself as a definitive reference. He served as a trustee of the Wordsworth Trust, which maintains Dove Cottage, the Grasmere home of Dorothy and William Wordsworth.

== Mountaineering ==
Bicknell followed his father as an amateur mountaineer, with his first experiences coming on family holidays in the Alps from 1924. In 1927, he was one of a four-man climbing expedition in the French Alps led by his father, during which Raymond Bicknell died in a fall. The Alpine Club account of the accident praised Peter Bicknell's skill and bravery. This terrible experience failed to put him off mountaineering, and he continued to participate in climbing expeditions in the Alps until 1955, often with his younger brother Claud. As a mountaineer, he is best known for his 1932 complete traverse of the Cuillin Ridge on Skye in under 12 hours (gaining the main ridge record of 8 hours 1 minute), beating the time of the first single-day traverse by Leslie Shadbolt and Alastair C. McLaren in 1911; he was accompanied for part of the climb by the physiologist, Alan Hodgkin.

Bicknell contributed the book British Hills and Mountains (1947) to Collins' Britain in Pictures series, with his own illustrations in pen-and-ink and watercolours. He served as president of the Climbers' Club in 1951–54.

== Personal life ==
In 1936, Bicknell married Mari Scott Henderson (1914–2003), a ballet dancer who had performed with Sadler's Wells Ballet. Mari Bicknell founded a ballet school in Cambridge. The couple had four children, a son and three daughters. In the 1930s, Bicknell occupied a flat above Essex House on Regent Street, designed and built by Hughes and Bicknell. For forty years from around 1939, the family lived at Finella – a prominent house on the Backs that had been remodelled by Raymond McGrath and split into two by Hughes and Bicknell – and later at a house designed by Bicknell on Newton Road. In addition to collecting books and artworks (see above), he amassed a fine collection of lustreware.

In May 1995, Peter Bicknell fell ill while visiting his eldest daughter Caroline in France; he died in hospital at Avignon on 31 May 1995.
