= Conservatoire for Dance and Drama =

The Conservatoire for Dance and Drama was a higher education institution in the United Kingdom. It was founded in 2001 to bring together a number of schools providing higher-level vocational training in the performing arts.

The official website stated: "Each of the schools who were members of the Conservatoire decided to pursue an independent pathway outside of the Conservatoire. We are pleased to confirm that as of June 2022, each of the schools has achieved its desired outcome and is now an independent higher education provider or has a new partnership arrangement."

There were six member schools and two affiliate schools.

Member schools

- Bristol Old Vic Theatre School in Bristol
- Central School of Ballet in London
- London Contemporary Dance School
- National Centre for Circus Arts in London
- Northern School of Contemporary Dance in Leeds
- Rambert School of Ballet and Contemporary Dance

Affiliate schools

- London Academy of Music and Dramatic Art (LAMDA) (former member)
- Royal Academy of Dramatic Art (RADA) in London

The Conservatoire offered undergraduate and postgraduate courses including dance (ballet, contemporary, choreography), drama (acting, directing, writing), production arts (stage and screen), and circus arts.

Each of the Conservatoire schools was a separate and distinct institution that employs its own teaching staff and remains legally autonomous. At the same time, students were registered jointly with the Conservatoire and the individual school.

The Conservatoire operated through a series of committees and working groups to determine policy for the schools as a whole. The schools themselves were involved at every level of deliberation within the Conservatoire, enabling them to share knowledge and expertise for the benefit of staff, students and the wider creative world that they serve.

The Conservatoire was placed eighth in the Guardian's University Guide 2019: Drama & Dance table.
