= Liz Roche =

Irish choreographer

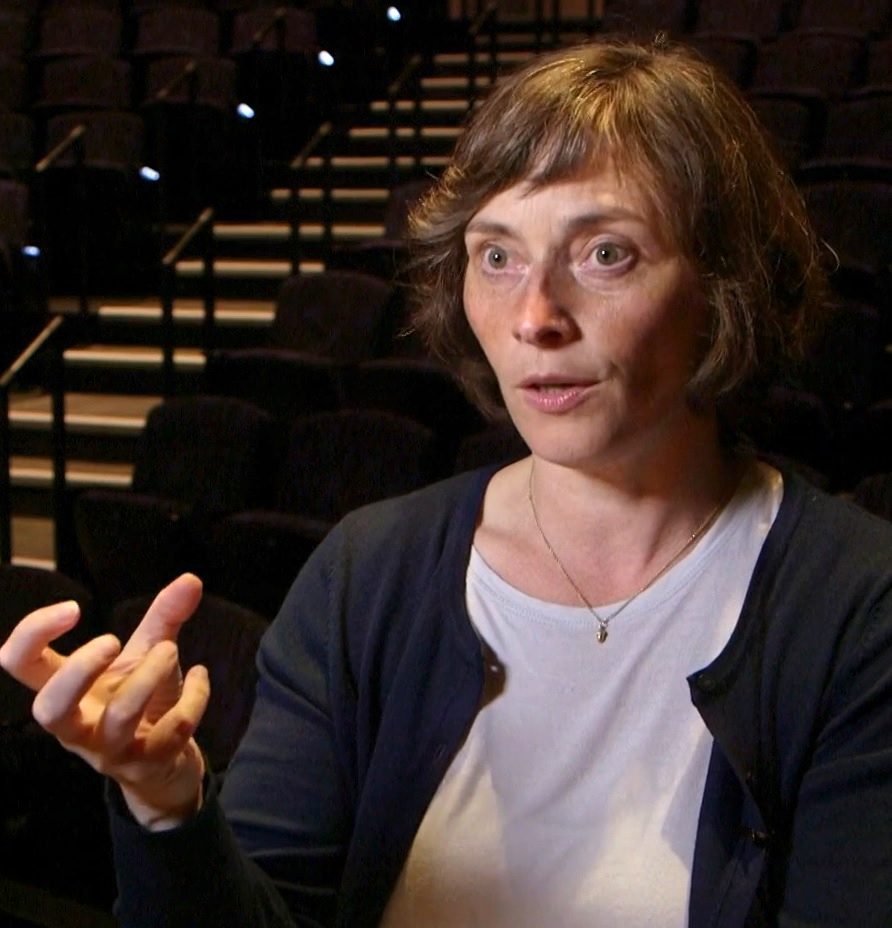
- Roche in 2022
- Born: 1975 (age 50–51); Dublin, Ireland
- Education: London Contemporary Dance School
- Known for: choreography
- Notable work: If I Fall; Alternately Terrific and Gentle; Dēmos; Embodied; Bastard Amber
- Movement: contemporary dance
- Spouse: Paolo
- Children: 1
- Elected: Aosdána (2020)
- Website: lizrochecompany.com

Liz Roche (born 1975) is an Irish choreographer, working in contemporary dance. She is a member of Aosdána, an elite Irish association of artists.

== Early life ==
Roche was born in Dublin in 1974, and grew up in Dundrum, Dublin.

== Career ==
Roche studied at the Irish National College of Dance and London Contemporary Dance School; she left school at 15 to pursue dance as a career. As a dancer, she appeared in David Bolger's Ballads (1997).

Roche founded Rex Levitates Dance Company with her sister Jenny in 1999; it was in 2012 renamed Liz Roche Company. In 2009–12 she was choreographer-in-residence at the Irish World Academy of Music and Dance at the University of Limerick.

She works in contemporary dance and video installation art. Awards won by Liz Roche include the Peter Darrell Choreographic Award, Bonnie Bird UK New Choreography Award and the Dublin Fringe Festival's Jane Snow Award. She has also worked with opera productions.

In 2020 Roche was elected to Aosdána.
