= Phoenix Dance Theatre =

Dance company in Leeds, England

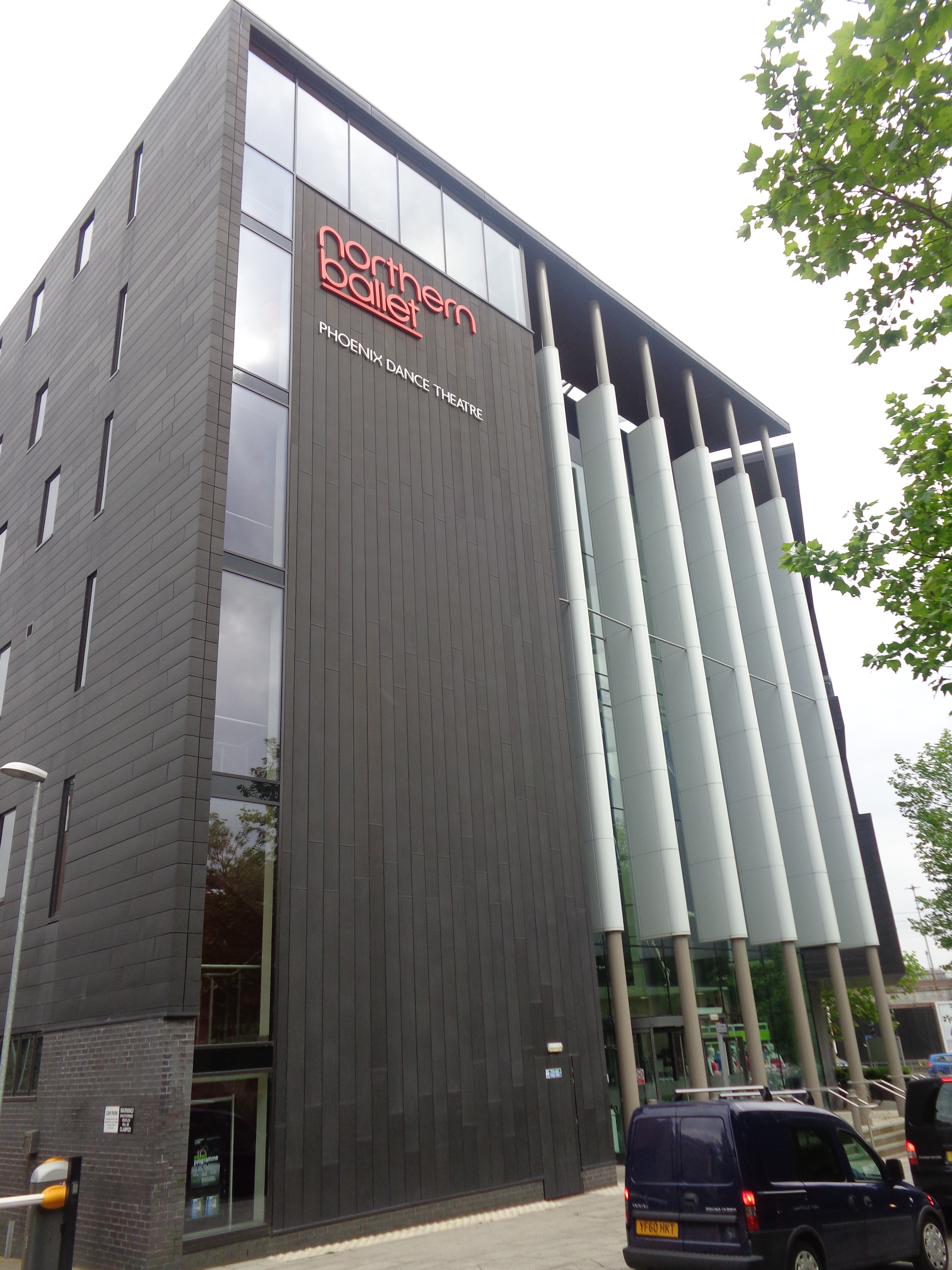
Headquarters of Phoenix Dance Theatre and Northern Ballet, Quarry Hill, Leeds.

Phoenix Dance Theatre is a dance company based in Leeds, West Yorkshire, England, that has grown from small beginnings in inner-city Leeds to be one of Britain’s leading contemporary dance companies. The company tours nationally and internationally.

== History ==
Phoenix Dance Company was formed in 1981 in the inner-city Harehills area of Leeds by three young men – David Hamilton (Artistic Director), Donald Edwards and Vilmore James – who had begun dancing at Harehills Middle School. They were taught there by Nadine Senior, who went on to be the first principal of Northern School of Contemporary Dance. By the summer of 1982, Phoenix had acquired two other dancers, Merville Jones and Edward Lynch, both members of Harehills Youth Dance Theatre in Leeds, and, in 1985, the company moved to its first permanent base in Chapeltown.

In 1987, David Hamilton left the company to pursue a solo career, and in July Neville Campbell joined Phoenix as Artistic Director. In 1990 Phoenix won the Grand Prize at the International Choreographic Competition in Bagnolet for Aletta Collins' piece Gang of Five and was nominated for the Laurence Olivier Award for the Most Outstanding Achievement of the Year in Dance.

Under Artistic Director Margaret Morris, who joined the company in 1991, Phoenix became established on the UK touring circuit and performed internationally particularly in the USA.

Following Margaret Morris' departure in 1997, Artistic Director Thea Nerissa Barnes led the company until 2000. In July 1998 Phoenix was commissioned by the BBC to perform with Roni Size at the Windrush Gala concert, which was broadcast nationally.

Artistic Directors

- David (Leo) Hamilton (1981 – 1987)
- Neville Campbell (1987 – 1991)
- Margaret Morris (1991 – 1996)
- Thea Narissa Barnes (1997 – 2000)
- Darshan Singh Bhuller (2002 – 2006)
- Javier De Frutos (2006 – 2008)
- Sharon Watson (2009 – 2020)
- Dane Hurst (2021 – 2023)
- Marcus Jarrell Willis (2023 - present)

== Phoenix Dance Theatre ==
Darshan Singh Bhuller was appointed as Artistic Director in 2002 and oversaw a complete rebranding of the company, changing the name to Phoenix Dance Theatre. During his tenure as Artistic Director from 2002 to 2006 Phoenix also began performing in predominantly large-scale venues.

He was succeeded as Artistic Director by Javier de Frutos, during whose tenure Phoenix won the "Company Prize for Outstanding Repertoire (Modern)" in the Critics' Circle National Dance Awards, 2006. In 2007 the company was invited to perform at the 5th International Festival of Contemporary Dance - La Biennale di Venezia, closing the festival with the final performance.

== Sharon Watson ==
Sharon Watson became the seventh Artistic Director of Phoenix Dance Theatre in May 2009, continuing a relationship with the company that stretches over 20 years. She first joined Phoenix as a dancer under the stage name Chantal Donaldson, from 1989 to 1997, during which time she choreographed the pieces Shaded Limits and Never Still for the company.

She returned to Phoenix in 2000 as Rehearsal and Tour Director, following which she embarked upon a fellowship with the Clore Leadership Programme, while continuing her freelance work mentoring emerging artists, lecturing in vocational dance schools and delivering bespoke training programmes.

In 2008 Watson was one of 26 aspiring leaders from around the globe selected to attend Dance East’s fourth Rural Retreat, an intensive four-day think-tank exploring the challenges of the role of Artistic Directors in the 21st century. Prior to taking up post at Phoenix she also spent eight months as Director of Learning and Access at Northern Ballet Theatre.

In 2010, she was named as one of the Cultural Leadership Programme’s Women to Watch, a list of 50 influential women working in arts and culture in the UK selected by a distinguished panel made up of figures from the cultural and creative industries.

== New building ==
In autumn 2010 Phoenix moved from its home of more than 20 years at Yorkshire Dance into a purpose-built dance centre in the centre of Leeds, alongside Northern Ballet. It is the largest space for dance outside London and is the only space for dance to house a national classical and a national contemporary dance company alongside each another.

== Current repertoire ==
Mixed Programme 2021

- " BERNSTEIN DOUBLE BILL " - Choreographer Dane Hurst
- 40 YEARS OF PHOENIX

Mixed Programme 2019

- " THE RITE OF SPRING " - Choreographer Jeanguy Saintus
- LEFT UNSEEN - Choreographer Amaury Lebrun

Mixed Programme 2018

- " Kirke" - Choreographer Sandrine Monin
- Windrush: Movement of the People - Choreographer Sharon Watson
- Calyx - Choreographer Sandrine Monin
- Shadows - Choreographer Christopher Bruce

Mixed Programme 2017

- REfined - Choreographer Sharon Watson

Mixed Programme 2016

- Undivided Love - Choreographer Kate Flatt

Mixed Programme 2015

- Shift - Choreographer Christopher Bruce CBE
- Shadows - Choreographer Christopher Bruce CBE
- TearFall - Choreographer Sharon Watson
- Bloom - Choreographer Caroline Finn

Mixed Programme 2014

- See Blue Through - Choreographer Didy Veldman
- Document - Choreographers Uri Ivgi and Johan Greben
- Mapping - Choreographer Darshan Singh Bhuller

Particle Velocity Programme 2013

- All Alight - Choreographer Richard Alston
- Ki - Choreographer Jose Agudo
- Tender Crazy Love - Choreographer Douglas Thorpe
- Repetition of Change - Choreographer Sharon Watson

Crossing Points Programme 2012

- Signal - Choreographer Henri Oguike
- Catch - Choreographer Ana Lujan Sanchez
- Maybe Yes Maybe, Maybe No Maybe - Choreographer Aletta Collins
- SoundClash - Choreographer Kwesi Johnson

Reflected Programme Spring 2011

- Switch - Choreographer Richard Wherlock
- What It Is - Choreographer Philip Taylor
- Pave Up Paradise - Choreographer Lost Dog
- Melt - Choreographer Sharon Watson

Declarations Programme Autumn 2010

- The Audacious One - Choreographer Warren Adams
- Locked In Vertical - Choreographer Isira Makuloluwe
- Haunted Passages - Choreographer Philip Taylor
- Maybe Yes Maybe, Maybe No Maybe - Choreographer Aletta Collins

Leeds in Barcelona Spring 2010

- Never 2 Still - Choreographer Sharon Watson

Ignite Programme Autumn 2009 / Spring 2010

- 1976 - Choreographer Alesandra Seutin
- Beast - Choreographer Douglas Thorpe
- Class - Choreographer Darshan Singh Bhuller
- Fast Lane - Choreographer Sharon Watson

== Current dancers ==
1. Aaron Chaplin
2. Alana Cowie
3. Alabama Seymour
4. Charlie Nayler
5. Matthew Topliss
6. Megan Lumsden
7. Melina Sofocleus
8. Shawn Willis
9. Reynaldo Junior Santos
10. Yuma Sylla

[16]
