= Central School of Ballet =

Coordinates: 51°30′20″N 0°06′23″W

Location
- 21-22 Hatfields, Paris Garden; London, SE1 8DJ; United Kingdom

Information
- Type: Independent
- Motto: Become the best possible dancer you can and want to be
- Established: 1982
- Founder: Christopher Gable & Ann Stannard
- Specialist: Classical Ballet
- Director: Mark Osterfield
- Affiliations: Conservatoire for Dance and Drama
- Website: www.centralschoolofballet.co.uk

Central School of Ballet is a classical ballet school based in London, with students from countries all over the world.

== History ==
The school was established in 1982 by Ann Stannard and Christopher Gable. It established a touring company, Ballet Central, in 1984. From 2004, Central started to offer degree courses accredited by the University of Kent.

In 2018, more than £25,000 worth of costumes were stolen from a van belonging to the Central School of Ballet. The costumes were recovered after a social media appeal.

The school is based in the Countess of Wessex Studios, named after Sophie, Duchess of Edinburgh (then known as the Countess of Wessex), who has been a patron of the Central School of Ballet since 2003 and who opened the studios in 2020.

== Alumni ==
Rio Ferdinand, footballer
