= Robin Howard =

British philanthropist (1924–1989)

Robin Jared Stanley Howard CBE (17 May 1924 – 12 June 1989) was a British philanthropist, dance patron and founder of The Place who promoted modern dance in the UK.

== Biography ==
=== Early life ===
Born in London, England, Howard was the grandson of Prime Minister Stanley Baldwin and the eldest child of Sir Arthur Howard and Lady Lorna Howard. On both sides of the family there was a strong tradition of public service, and an early involvement with the arts from his mother. He studied at Eton College and served in World War II as a lieutenant in the Scots Guards (1942–45), until he sustained injuries in the Netherlands that resulted in the loss of both his legs. In 1945 he resumed his education at Trinity College, Cambridge, and passed the bar examination to become a lawyer, but he never practiced; instead he entered the hotel and restaurant business. In 1956 he formed the Hungarian Department of the United Nations Association in England to assist refugees, and he served as its director of international service (1956–63).

=== Dance career ===
Howard became a full-time patron of modern dance in 1963, beginning with his sponsorship of performances by the Martha Graham Dance Company, a troupe that he first encountered in 1954. He persuaded Graham to return to Britain to appear at the 1963 Edinburgh Festival and in a London engagement. Following the company's successful tour, he established Graham-inspired classes, and by 1967 he had founded the London Contemporary Dance Group and school, and starting the London Modern Choreographic dance school, (afterward renamed the London Contemporary Dance Theatre) and the Contemporary Dance Trust, of which he was director general (1966–88) and life president (1988–89). In 1969 Howard based the Trust in a London complex of buildings known as The Place, which has served as a centre for British contemporary dance ever since.

=== Business ventures ===
Howard was successful in several business ventures, particularly with his purchase (against all advice) and transformation of the Gore Hotel, where he was able to put to good use his enthusiasm for wine. However, he sold many of his most cherished possessions to support contemporary dance in Britain and persuaded many others to make generous donations too.

Howard was also a noted collector of contemporary art, particularly in the 1950s and 1960s. He was a passionate supporter of artists shown at Gallery One in London and became a major patron of both Francis Newton Souza and John Christoforou during this period. Like in other aspects of his life, Howard appreciated the vibrancy and power involved in their art - a contrast with some of the cooler, more cerebral movements then in vogue.

In the 1976 New Year Honours Howard was made a CBE in recognition of his services to dance, and in 1989 he was elected President of the International Dance Council of the International Theatre Institute. In 2001, the theatre at The Place was renamed the Robin Howard Dance Theatre in his honour.

== Influence ==
Howard is now recognised as one of the founders of Contemporary Dance in Britain. To quote journalist Clement Crisp in the Financial Times:

It is impossible to overestimate the significance of Robin Howard's work in securing and fostering the growth and development of contemporary dance in Britain... Robin Howard was single-minded in his dedication, and he worked without sparing himself. His simplicity and generosity of manner, his idealism and enthusiasm, touched everyone who knew or worked with him. His best memorial is surely the grand flowering of dance in this country that he inspired and guided."
