= Candoco =

British dance company

Candoco Dance Company is a contemporary physically integrated dance company, founded in 1991 by Celeste Dandeker and Adam Benjamin. The company is based at the Aspire National training centre in Stanmore, North London.

== History ==
Candoco Dance Company was founded in 1991 by Celeste Dandeker-Arnold OBE and Adam Benjamin. The Company developed out of integrated workshops at London's Aspire Centre for Spinal Injury and quickly grew into the first company of its kind in the UK – a professional dance company focused on the integration of disabled and non-disabled artists.

Artistic Director Celeste Dandeker-Arnold OBE commissioned 30 new performance works for the company from internationally renowned choreographers including Emily Claid, Javier de Frutos, Doug Elkins, Siobhan Davies, Fin Walker, Darshan Singh-Bhuller, Annabel Arden and Stephen Petronio. Celeste's priority was that Candoco should be programmed and judged as a dance company, not a therapeutic project. Her ambitious commissioning strategy reflected this vision and became the backbone of the company's success, catapulting it into the mainstream dance world from the very beginning. In 2013 Celeste won the Liberty Human Rights Award in recognition for her work.

Candoco's former artistic co-directors Stine Nilsen and Pedro Machado were appointed as Celeste's successors in 2007. They commissioned work from leading choreographers Emanuel Gat, Rachid Ouramdane, Wendy Houstoun and Javier de Frutos, restaged Trisha Brown's seminal Set and Reset to include disabled dancers for the first time, and commissioned the UK's leading disabled choreographers; Marc Brew and Claire Cunningham for Unlimited – part of the London 2012 Cultural Festival. Under their directorship they took Candoco from the Bird's Nest in Beijing to the Olympic Stadium in London; performing at the handover ceremonies in 2008 and returning, alongside Coldplay, at the Paralympic Closing in 2012. In 2018, Ben Wright and Candoco founding member Charlotte Darbyshire joined the company as artistic co-directors.

== Repertoire ==
Benjamin choreographed much of the early companies work, leaving the company in 1998, and Dandeker went on to commission work by many established choreographers including Rafeal Bonachela, Fin Walker, Siobhan Davies, Javier De Frutos, Stephen Petronio and Nigel Charnock amongst many others. Stine Nilsen and Pedro Machado succeeded in 2007 and they continued to commission choreographers including Javier de Frutos, Claire Cunningham and Arlene Phillips.

=== 2011 Restaging of Trisha Brown's Set and Reset ===
For the 20th Anniversary the company restaged the seminal Set and Reset, choreographed by Trisha Brown in 1983. Retitled Set and Reset/Reset, this reworking reprocessed rather than replicated the original version. The piece was performed again in 2016, this time directed by Abigail Yager a former dancer with the Trisha Brown Dance Company.

=== 2012 Paralympic Games and related performances ===
In 2008 Candoco took part in the Handover Ceremonies at the Beijing Olympic and Paralympic Games, representing Britain. It was the first time disabled artists were present in both events in the history of the games. The company performed at both the opening and closing ceremonies of the 2012 Summer Paralympics in London.
