= Janet Smith (dancer) =

British dancer, choreographer and college principal

- Born: Leeds, England
- Education: Dartington College of Arts
- Occupations: Dancer, choreographer
- Known for: Former Principal of the Northern School of Contemporary Dance, Artistic Director of Scottish Dance Theatre
- Awards: Member of the Order of the British Empire (MBE)

Janet Smith is a British dancer, choreographer, and former principal of the Northern School of Contemporary Dance (NCSD) in Leeds, England.

She studied at Dartington College of Arts and in New York.

She became principal of the NCSD in February 2012, having previously been the artistic director of Scottish Dance Theatre.

She was appointed M.B.E. in the 2015 New Year Honours, and was awarded an honorary degree of Doctor of Arts by the University of Kent in 2017.
