= Rosemary Butcher =

British choreographer and dancer

Rosemary Butcher (1947–2016) was a British choreographer and dancer.

== Life and career ==
Butcher studied ballet as a child. She was the first dance student at the Dartington College of Arts. She spent 1968–1970 in New York, studying with the Martha Graham and Cunningham schools. Since this period, visual art was an influence on her work in dance. She also cited the Judson Dance Theater as an important influence.

Butcher founded her own company shortly after returning to Britain in 1972.

Butcher also taught well-known dancers such as Gill Clarke throughout her career.

== Work ==
Butcher's work is described as minimalist. Her concerts are often sited in non-conventional spaces or even art galleries. Butcher was one of the first choreographers to incorporate video into her work.

== Awards and exhibitions ==
Butcher was named an MBE. Butcher presented her work at Serpentine Gallery and Tate Modern. Butcher was shortlisted for the Place prize for choreography in 2004.
