= Scottish Dance Theatre =

Dance troupe in Dundee City, Scotland

Wikipedia Encyclopedia

Scottish Dance Theatre is a Scotland's national contemporary dance company based at Dundee Rep Theatre in Dundee, Scotland. It was founded by Royston Maldoom in 1986 as the Dundee Rep Dance Company.

== The Company ==
The company is currently led by Artistic Director Joan Clevillé who took the role in April 2019. He returned to Scottish Dance Theatre after performing with the company 2009-2013. Fleur Darkin, who joined the company in 2011. His predecessors, Fleur Darkin and Janet Smith, led the company from 2011-2019 and 1997-2011 respectively. Each of the Artistic Directors have contributed to the company's choreographic repertoire.

In 2003 SDT won the Critics' Circle National Dance Award for Outstanding Company Repertoire (Modern) and also won a Herald Angel Award for its performance of Liv Lorent's Luxuria at the 2005 Edinburgh Festival Fringe.

Scottish Dance Theatre performed in Cyprus and Athens during the summer of 2008, before returning to the Edinburgh Fringe Festival in August. In November 2009 the company toured to Dubai and China before continuing its UK Autumn tour. In 2010 the company has performed again at the Edinburgh Fringe Festival and has toured across Holland and to Milan. In 2012 the company toured India and conducted an extensive outreach programme in four major cities, reaching school audiences, non-dance teachers, underprivileged children, children with additional support needs and working with new and established dance organisations on the ground.

The company is a founder member of RepNet. RepNet is a network which currently brings together 5 repertoire/commissioning dance companies of similar size and circumstance from five North European countries to mutually support, strengthen and enhance their work through the exchange of experience, sharing and learning. The member companies are Skånes Dansteater (Sweden), Carte Blanche (Norway), Iceland Dance Company, Tanztheater nordwest (Tanzcompagnie Oldenburg and Tanztheater Bremen; Germany) and Scottish Dance Theatre.

== Repertoire ==
Currently the company is working on the following works:

- Process Day by Sharon Eyal & Gai Behar
- The Circle by Emanuel Gat
- LOOPING: Scotland Overdub by 7Oito
- RITUALIA by Colette Sadler
- TuTuMucky by Botis Seva

New work being developed by the company:

- Antigone, Interrupted by Joan Clevillé
