= Richard Alston Dance Company =

British contemporary dance company

Coordinates: 51°31′38″N 0°7′43″W

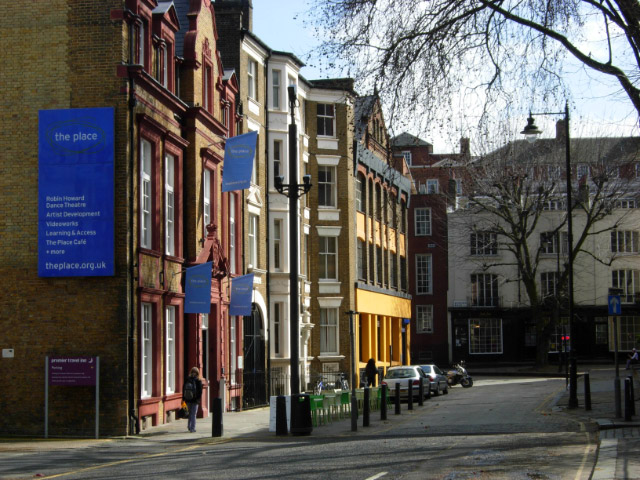
The Place, London

The Richard Alston Dance Company was a medium size, British contemporary dance company that was formed in 1994 after the demise of the London Contemporary Dance Theatre, based at The Place in London.
