= Siobhan Davies =

British dancer and choreographer (born 1950)

Davies's voice
recorded 2012, as part of an audio description of Kings Cross, London, for VocalEyes

Dame Siobhan Davies DBE (born Susan Davies; 18 September 1950, London), often known as Sue Davies, is an English dancer and choreographer. She was a dancer with the London Contemporary Dance Theatre during the 1970s, and became one of its leading choreographers creating work such as Sphinx] (1977). In 1988, she founded her own company, Siobhan Davies Dance.

Originally trained in art, Davies was one of the first year's intake of full-time students at the London School of Contemporary Dance. Her works White Man Sleeps and Wyoming have been included on the dance GCE A-Level syllabus. Her work Bird Song is being used in GCSE Dance syllabus as Set Work (2008–2010). She is among the top contemporary choreographers in the UK.

== Personal life and career ==
She was born Susan Davies in 1950 and first performed with the company that came to be Dance Theatre Robert Cohan in 1967. She was made resident choreographer in 1984 before leaving the company in 1985. In 1986, Davies won the Fulbright Arts Fellowship, the first ever to be awarded to a choreographer.

In 1982, she joined forces with Richard Alston and Ian Spink to create Second Stride, which has been lauded as one of the most influential dance companies of the 1980s as well as the first contemporary dance company to tour the United States. From 1988 to 1992, she was the associate choreographer of Rambert Dance Company.

=== Dance Company ===
In 1988, Davies founded Siobhan Davies Dance Company, a contemporary dance company in the United Kingdom, involving dancers such as Gill Clarke. From 2000, Davies began a change in choreographic style, moving towards creating site-specific dance work, and in 2007 decided to abandon touring dance productions altogether.

=== Siobhan Davies Dance ===
In 2006, Siobhan Davies opened her eponymous studio (Siobhan Davies Studios), designed by architect Sarah Wigglesworth within the shell of a derelict brick school building in south London. It won the 2006 RIBA Award.

The company produces and commissions new work from live performance to contemporary film, and actively takes part in industry and academic exploration. It also uses its London-based building as a visual art gallery as well as a dance studio space. The company regularly takes part in the annual Dance Umbrella season.

Already Commander of the Order of the British Empire (CBE), Davies was promoted to Dame Commander of the Order of the British Empire (DBE) in the 2020 Birthday Honours for services to dance.
