= Northern School of Contemporary Dance =

Dance school in West Yorkshire, England

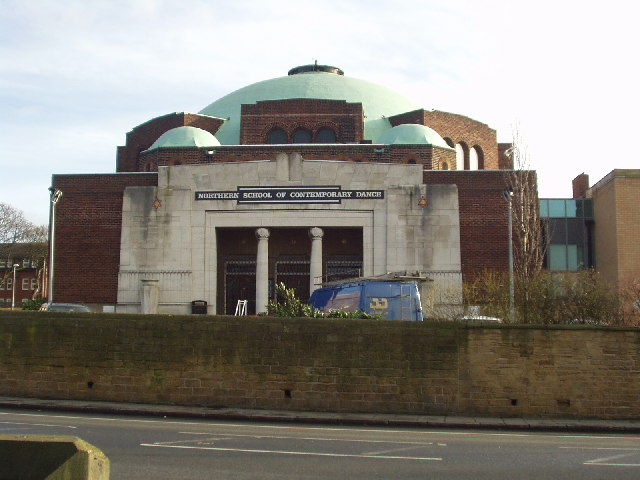
- Type: Contemporary dance school
- Established: 1983
- Affiliations: Conservatoire for Dance and Drama; University of Kent
- Principal: Sharon Watson
- Students: c. 250
- Location: Chapeltown Road, Leeds, LS7 4BH, England; 53°48′48″N 1°32′00″W
- Website: nscd.ac.uk

Listed Building – Grade II
- Official name: The Northern School of Contemporary Dance
- Type: Listed building
- Designated: 22 November 1991
- Reference no.: 1255639

Listed Building – Grade II
- Official name: 98 Chapeltown Road
- Type: Listed building
- Designated: 22 November 1991
- Reference no.: 1255632

Listed Building – Grade II
- Official name: Wall gates and piers to north east and west of Northern School of Contemporary Dance
- Type: Listed building
- Designated: 22 November 1991
- Reference no.: 1255641

The Northern School of Contemporary Dance (NSCD) is a higher education institution in Chapeltown, Leeds, England specialising in contemporary dance. Students can obtain undergraduate and postgraduate degrees in dance, validated by the University of Kent. A programme of adult, youth and children's classes is also available for the local community. Its buildings include the grade II listed former New Synagogue.

== History and buildings ==
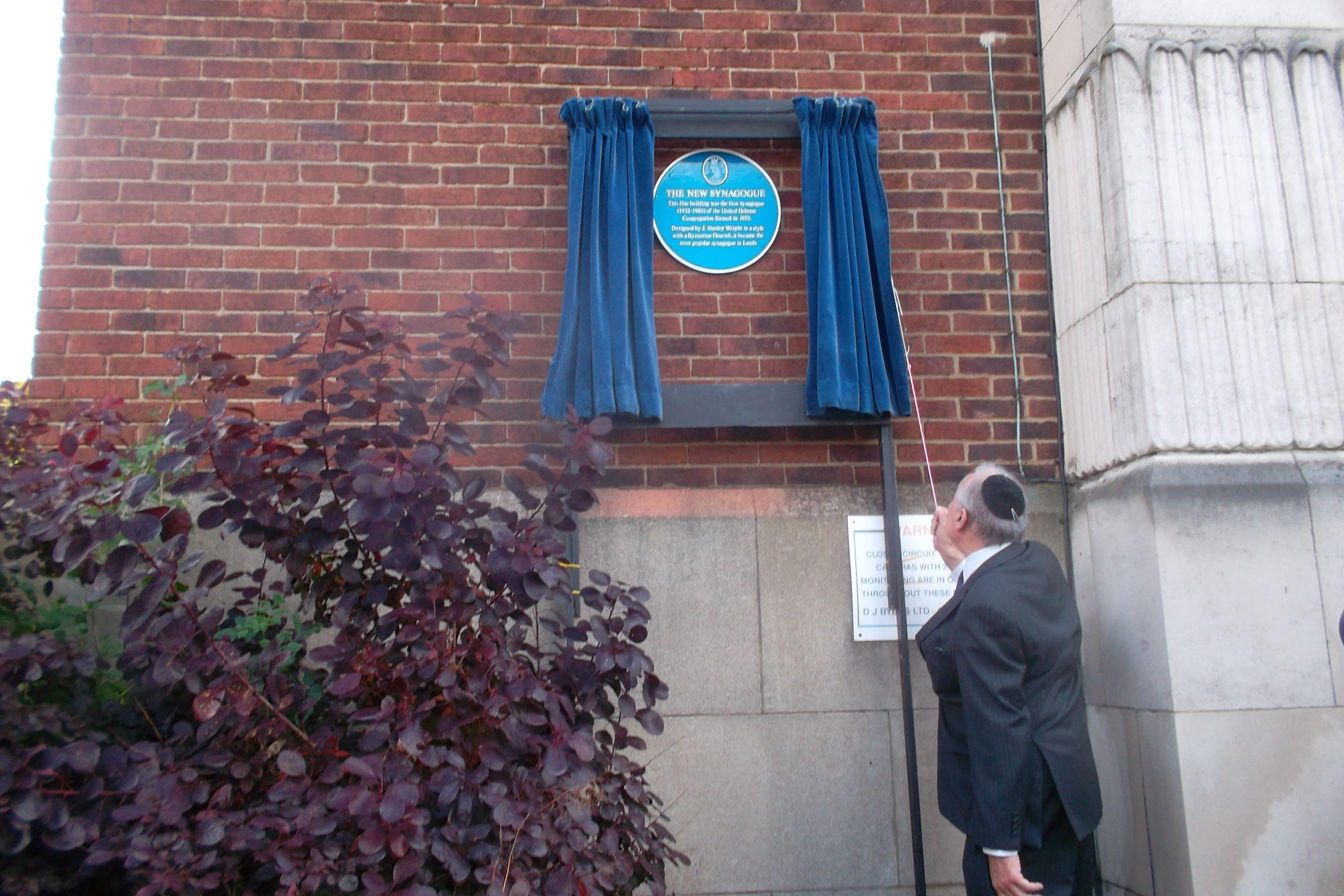
The 2012 unveiling of a plaque commemorating the former New Synagogue

The school is housed in a former Orthodox Jewish synagogue, a red-brick domed building that was completed in 1932. The Jewish congregation worshipped in the building until 1985, when the building was sold.

The school was founded in 1985 by Nadine Senior and in 1987 it moved into its current premises, located on Chapeltown Road. The building was listed as a Grade II building in 1991 as were the boundary walls, which date from c. 1835.

Between 1987 and 1997, a series of phased developments were carried out which extended the site to include the adjacent Brandsby Lodge, also a grade II listed building. This £3.2 million redevelopment, which resulted in the creation of four new dance studios and additional teaching facilities, was completed with funding support from the National Lottery through the Arts Council of England and the Foundation for Sports and the Arts.

In 1988, the converted former synagogue re-opened its doors as The Dome Theatre and in 1993 was renamed The Riley Theatre in dedication to the memory of Jeffrey Riley, who was the School's Technical Director between 1985 and his untimely death in Kobe, Japan in 1993.

Senior retired in 2001 and was replaced in 2002 by Gurmit Hukam. In 2012, Janet Smith MBE was appointed principal, having previously been the Artistic Director of Scottish Dance Theatre. In 2020, Smith stepped down from her role, and was replaced with Sharon Watson MBE, formerly the longest-standing Artistic Director of Phoenix Dance Theatre in Leeds. In 2022, NSCD left the Conservatoire for Dance and Drama to become an independently registered Higher Education Institution.

== Vocational training ==
NSCD offers full-time vocational training in contemporary dance at Certificate, Bachelors and Masters levels. The training includes classes influenced by the techniques of Cunningham and Graham, the more modern hybrid, evolved techniques and release based techniques as well as complementary training in ballet, yoga and fitness.

== Centre for Advanced Training ==
In 2004, with funding support from the Department for Children, Schools & Families’ Music and Dance Scheme, NSCD and Northern Ballet came together to establish Yorkshire Young Dancers (YYD), the first national dance Centre for Advanced Training (CAT) in the UK. There are now a total of 10 dance CATs offering pre-vocational dance training to young people across the country.

== See also ==
- History of the Jews in England
- List of former synagogues in the United Kingdom
- Listed buildings in Leeds (Chapel Allerton Ward)
