= London Contemporary Dance Theatre =

The London Contemporary Dance Theatre (LCDT) was a contemporary dance company, based at The Place, founded by Robin Howard with Robert Cohan as its Artistic Director.

Founded in 1967, and strongly influenced by the ideas of American modern and postmodern dance artists Martha Graham and Merce Cunningham, the company was probably the first contemporary dance company in the UK, and played a pioneering role in developing the art form in that country.

Choreographers such as Siobhan Davies, Christopher Bannerman and Micha Bergese, worked alongside composers like Barrington Pheloung to create new works which were performed at the Sadler's Wells Theatre and toured the UK and internationally.

Well-known works created by the company include:

- Cell (1969)
- Troy Game (1974)
- Forest (1976)
- Nympheas (1976)
- Stabat Mater (1976)
- Sphinx (1977)
- Rainbow Bandit (1979)
- Run Like Thunder (1983)

LCDT won the 1975 Evening Standard Award for Outstanding Achievement In Ballet and Olivier Awards on three occasions: in 1978, 1989–1990 and 1994.

Cohan retired as LCDT's full-time artistic director in 1983 after the company’s successful first appearance at the Brooklyn Academy of Music in New York. He remained with the company on a half-yearly basis. Both Dan Wagoner, American dancer/choreographer, and Nancy Duncan, producer, then undertook the artistic directorship.

The company closed in 1994 when The Place refocused its work, creating the Richard Alston Dance Company, and developing a bigger presenting programme for the Robin Howard Dance Theatre.

London Contemporary Dance School was originally conceived to train dancers for the company, and awarded its first degree in practical dance in 1982. The School is still in operation as part of The Place.
