= The Place, London =

Dance and performance centre in Camden, London, England

The Place
- Camden, London
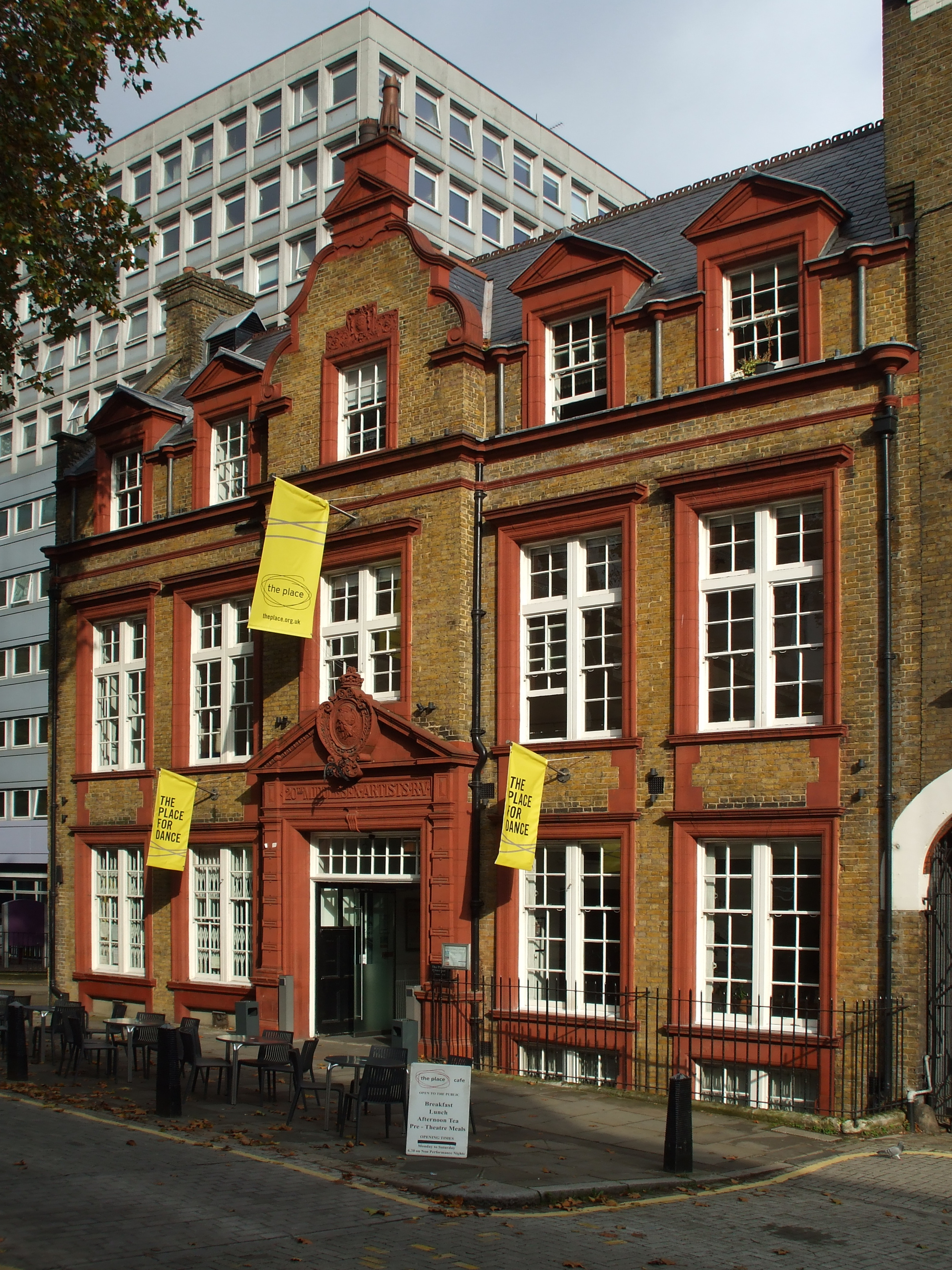
- The Place

Site information
- Type: Drill Hall

Location
- Location within London
- Coordinates: 51°31′38″N 0°7′43″W

Site history
- Built: 1888–1889
- Built for: War Office
- Architect: Robert Edis
- In use: 1889 – present

The Place is a dance and performance centre in Duke's Road near Euston in the London Borough of Camden. It is the home of London Contemporary Dance School and the Robin Howard Dance Theatre, and formerly the Richard Alston Dance Company.

== History ==
The building was designed by Robert William Edis as the headquarters of the 20th Middlesex (Artists') Volunteer Rifle Corps and built by Charles Kynoch and Company of Clapham between 1888 and 1889. It was officially opened by the Prince of Wales. The 20th Middlesex (Artists') Volunteer Rifle Corps became the 28th (County of London) Battalion, London Regiment (Artists' Rifles) in 1908. The battalion was mobilised at the drill hall in August 1914 before being deployed to the Western Front. When the London Regiment was broken up and the battalions reallocated to other units in August 1937, the hall became the home of the Artists Rifles, The Rifle Brigade. The unit was disbanded in 1945, after the Second World War, but reformed again in the Rifle Brigade in January 1947 but transferred to the Army Air Corps in July 1947 as the 21st Special Air Service Regiment (Artists Rifles). The drill hall fell vacant when the 21st Special Air Service Regiment moved out to the Duke of York's Headquarters in the late 1960s.

The drill hall, which had been colloquially known as "The Artists Place", became simply "The Place" when the Contemporary Ballet Trust took over the premises in 1969. In 1976, the Contemporary Ballet Trust, under the leadership of Robin Howard, acquired the freehold of the premises as well as a site in Flaxman Terrace so facilitating an extension studio block to be built.

In 1971, The Royal Shakespeare Company leased the building to provide them with a venue for new writing, experimental work and "small-scale examination of…classical work". The director was Buzz Goodbody.

Later in the 1970s, the Contemporary Ballet Trust established the London Contemporary Dance School and the London Contemporary Dance Theatre, both of which were formed at The Place; in 1994, the latter body was succeeded by the Richard Alston Dance Company which remained in residence at The Place until 2020. Then in 1999, a major redevelopment programme, principally funded by the National Lottery, allowed the refurbishment of the original drill hall and the replacement of the studio block with six new state-of-the-art dance studios designed by architects Allies and Morrison. Two further dance studios, the Weston Studio and the Monument Studio, were added in 2008.

From 2004 to 2013, Bloomberg sponsored The Place Prize, a large contemporary choreography competition. In September 2007, Kenneth Tharp OBE took up the new position of Chief Executive of The Place. Tharp stepped down in November 2016 and was replaced, as interim chief executive, by Steven Browning. In summer 2017, Clare Connor was permanently appointed to the post.

== Sources ==
- Gregory, Barry (2006). A History of The Artists Rifles 1859–1947. Barnsley: Pen & Sword Books. ISBN 978-1-84415-503-3.
