= Aaron Sillis =

English dancer and choreographer

- Born: August 1983 (age 42–43); Drayton, Norfolk

Aaron Sillis (born August 1983) is an English dancer and choreographer who has worked in many fields of dance, most notably working with leading international pop artists including Rihanna, Katy Perry, FKA twigs, Justin Bieber, Kylie Minogue, Mariah Carey and Leona Lewis.

== Life and career ==
Sillis was born in August 1983, in Drayton, near Norwich in Norfolk, England.[1] He began studying dance at the age of 14 at the Central School of Performing Arts in Norwich[1] and at 16 he continued into professional vocational training in dance and musical theatre at Bird College in Sidcup, Kent.[2]

Aaron was a contemporary dance soloist before he began his lucrative career as a choreographer. He also worked as a background dancer for many of the world's leading artists.

Since his move into choreography, he has created movement for music videos, live performances, advertising campaigns and fashion magazine editorials worldwide. H&M enlisted Aaron to choreograph in 5 different countries for their World Recycle Week campaign featuring M.I.A. His talents working in the fashion industry led to creating a visual dance party in Paris for Vogue magazine and directing movement for Kristen Stewart in Daniel Askill's Chanel advert. Aaron has also worked with fashion heavy hitters like, Hermes, Lacoste, Calvin Klein, Paul Smith, Issey Miyake and Nike to name a few.

In 2016, Aaron's work on FKA TWIGS "M3LL155X" video earned him a MTV VMA nomination for Best Choreography alongside co-choreographers Benjamin Milan & Kenrick Sandy. He has collaborated with Twigs on numerous videos, "Two Weeks," "Pendulum," "Tw-ache" and "Wet Wipez: In the Zone." Aaron choreographed Twigs' "Soundtrack 7" film and installation at the Manchester International Festival alongside co-choreographers Gianna Gi, Kaner Flex and Ukweli Roach. He also choreographed twigs' television appearances on The Brits Are Coming and the MOBO Awards. Aaron has worked with other artists such as Laura Mvula, Kylie Minogue, George Michael, Sir Paul McCartney, Jungle, The Last Shadow Puppets and Zayn Malik. The Evening Standard included Aaron in "The Progress 1000:London's Most Influential People" list in 2015 & 2016. He also won the Times/Southbank Breakthrough Award in 2012. Aaron currently resides in London.

In 2018 Sillis provided choreography and dancing direction for Rita Ora's Let You Love Me live performances and for Years & Years's Palo Santo project. Always in 2018 he was hired as choreographer for X Factor Italia.

=== Dorian Gray ===
In 2008, Sillis created the lead role of the photographer Basil Hallward in a dance adaptation of the novel The Picture of Dorian Gray by Oscar Wilde. Choreographed by Matthew Bourne, the production premiered at the Edinburgh Festival and won the Herald Angel Award, which is presented in conjunction with the Bank of Scotland and recognising excellence at the festival. The production subsequently opened in London at the Sadler's Wells Theatre and was nominated for the Dance Europe Award for Outstanding Company and for the Whatsonstage Award for Best Choreography. Individually, Sillis was nominated for the Spotlight Award for Male Artist (Modern) at the National Dance Awards and was nominated for and won the Breakthrough Award presented by The Times newspaper at the 2009 South Bank Show Awards.

== Theatre credits ==
- The Most Incredible Thing – Created the role of Leo, The Creator. World Premiere at Sadler's Wells Theatre, composed by Pet Shop Boys, directed & choreographed by Javier de Frutos. The story was adapted by Matthew Dunster and also starred Ivan Putrov
- In The Spirit of Diaghilev: The Eternal Damnation Of Sancho & Sanchez – Created the role of David VII. World Premiere at Sadler's Wells Theatre, choreography by Javier de Frutos
- Dorian Gray – Created the role of Basil Hallward. World Premiere at the Edinburgh Festival, also at Sadler's Wells Theatre and touring, choreography by Matthew Bourne
- Swan Lake – Performed the pas de deux as 'The Prince' with Richard Winsor as 'The Swan', from the 1995 production by Matthew Bourne, at the 10th anniversary gala of the new Sadler's Wells theatre & Sadler's Wells Sampled
- The Car Man – Danced the roles of Rocco & Vito, covered & played Angelo at the Sadler's Wells theatre and on tour, choreography by Matthew Bourne
- Movin' Out – Danced in the ensemble, covered & played James, & understudy Eddie in the West End theatre production at the Apollo Victoria Theatre, production choreographed and staged by Twyla Tharp
- Nutcracker! – Danced in the ensemble as Liquorice Man, covered & played the principal role Fritz/Prince Bon-Bon at the Sadler's Wells Theatre and on tour, choreography by Matthew Bourne
