= Adam Cooper (dancer) =

English dancer (born 1971)

- Born: 22 July 1971 (age 55); Tooting, London, England
- Occupation: Dancer
- Spouse: Sarah Wildor (m. 2000)
- Children: 2

Adam Cooper (born 22 July 1971) is an English dancer. He works as both a performer and choreographer in musical theatre, and has choreographed and/or starred in award-winning shows such as On Your Toes, Singin' in the Rain and Grand Hotel. He began his professional career as a dancer of classical ballet and contemporary ballet and is a former Principal of the Royal Ballet, a major international ballet company based in London. He became internationally recognised for creating the lead role of "Swan/Stranger" in Matthew Bourne's contemporary dance production of the ballet Swan Lake, a role that was briefly featured in the 2000 film Billy Elliot, in which Cooper played the adult version of the titular character.

== Biography ==
Adam Cooper was born 22 July 1971 in Tooting, London to a musician father and a social worker mother. He has an older brother, Simon Cooper, who is also a dancer and they trained at the same schools. From a young age, he and his brother studied tap and ballet at the Jean Winkler School of Dance in Tooting. They also played various musical instruments and sang in a choir. At age 11, Cooper won a place at ArtsEd, a specialist performing arts school in London where he studied classical ballet, character, modern, tap, jazz and contemporary dance, as well as singing, acting and stage combat. After completing his secondary education at the school, aged 16, he was accepted into the Royal Ballet Upper School. At his graduation performance he played the lead role of Young Man in Ashton's the Two Pigeons.

Cooper married Sarah Wildor in 2000. She was a principal dancer with the Royal Ballet She has become an Olivier-nominated actress. Their first child, a daughter, was born in 2008. They also have a son.

== Dance ==
=== Royal Ballet ===
In 1989 Cooper joined the Royal Ballet and was quickly promoted to First Artist and Soloist in 1991, First Soloist 1993 and Principal Dancer in 1994. He was recognized for his performances in the classic as well as dramatic and contemporary ballet works, and he excelled in playing cruel but sexy villains. While with the Royal Ballet he worked extensively with choreographers Kenneth MacMillan and William Tuckett partnering all the leading ballerinas of the company including Sylvie Guillem and Darcey Bussell. He also performed works choreographed by George Balanchine, Ashley Page, Fokine, Bronislava Nijinska, Mikhail Baryshnikov, Christopher Wheeldon, Matthew Hart, and William Forsythe. He left the Royal Ballet in 1997 to freelance and expand his career opportunities.

=== Adventures in Motion Pictures ===
In 1995 Matthew Bourne recruited Cooper to join Adventures in Motion Pictures (since renamed New Adventures) for his radically re-interpreted production of Swan Lake. Together they created the basic Swan movement motifs and Cooper also contributed to the choreography. Cooper performed the dual "Swan/Stranger" role (the analog of the white and black swan in the classic version) all over the world and his performances won him international acclaim, multiple awards and a strong fan following. Cooper's performance was described as one of "tremendous excitement, subtlety, emotional depth and sheer sexiness". The popular press embraced him and his photo appeared in many magazines.

For his performances as the "Swan/Stranger" he received the Time Out Award in 1995, the Evening Standard Dance Award in 1997 and the 1999 Astaire Award for Best Dancer. He was also nominated for the Tony Award for Best Actor in a Musical at the 53rd Tony Awards in 1999. He appeared briefly at the end of the 2000 film Billy Elliot as the adult version of the title character, who is seen performing the role of the Swan. A DVD recording of the Swan Lake with Cooper and the original cast was issued in 1996 and can be seen on Youtube.com. Excerpts from Swan Lake (Bourne) appeared at the 1998 Royal Variety Performance and he repeated his "Swan/Stranger" role for the TV audience. His performance in the Billy Elliot film and in the Swan Lake (Bourne) DVD inspired Liam Mower, then playing Billy Elliot in the West End stage production, to join New Adventures in the hopes of performing The Swan role. In 2003 Cooper once again played the "Swan/Stranger" when AMP toured in Japan, and there was enormous enthusiasm for his performance and he acquired a large number of new fans.

In 1997 Cooper was invited by Bourne to take part in the initial planning of AMP's next show, Cinderella. This version of the dance took place in London during the Blitz, but used the same Prokofiev music as the classic version. Cooper helped to create and performed the role of Pilot (the Prince analog) in the initial 1997 London run, also playing the Angel (the Godmother analog), opposite his partner Sarah Wildor, playing the title role. The production was also performed in Los Angeles in 1999.

=== Freelance dancer and choreographer ===
In 1998 Cooper worked with the Scottish Ballet to choreograph Just Scratching the Surface. He also performed the Hoffmann role in their production of Tales of Hoffmann. Since then he has gone on to choreograph for other ballet companies and for musical theatre.

Cooper appeared as a dancer and choreographer at the Exeter Festival for 3 years, heading evenings of dance co-produced with Iain Webb. In 2002 Cooper and Sarah Wildor presented a tribute to Sir Kenneth MacMillan at Exeter and in Japan. The Adam Cooper Company represented the UK at the Washington International Ballet Festival in 2003 performing a revival of Sir Kenneth MacMillan's Sea of Troubles.

Cooper has frequently danced as a guest artist with the Royal Ballet since leaving the company, performing lead roles in Romeo and Juliet, Ondine and Onegin. and others. In 2002 he created the role of Badger in William Tuckett's The Wind in the Willows. In 2004 created the title role in Tuckett's The Soldier's Tale, which he reprised in 2005 and later performed in Japan in 2009 and 2015.

In 2005 he realized a long-held vision with his own production of Les Liaisons dangereuses, a mixture of theater and dance. Co-directed and designed by Lez Brotherston, the production was choreographed by Cooper and he also played the lead role of Viscomte de Valmont. The piece premiered in Japan early in the year before a summer season at Sadler's Wells, with a cast which included Simon Cooper and Sarah Wildor.

In 2009 Cooper joined Russell Maliphant to dance in Maliphant's 2:4:10 contemporary dance program- an evening of works celebrating Maliphant's 10 years as a choreographer.

== Musical theatre ==
=== 2002 to 2010 ===
In Cooper's first venture into musical theatre, he was both the choreographer and actor (playing the lead role of Junior Dolan) in On Your Toes. In 2002 it played at Leicester Haymarket, and was in transferred in 2003 to the Royal Festival Hall in London. Sarah Wildor joined the production in 2003 to play the role of Vera Baronova. He was lauded by both the critics and the audience for his contributions and received the Critics' Circle Theatre Award for Best Choreography and Most Popular Dancer. In 2004 the production also had a successful tour in Japan.

In 2002 Cooper provided the choreography for the Swedish production of Garbo-the Musical. Cooper also played the lead role of Don Lockwood and choreographed Paul Kerryson's Singin' in the Rain in 2004 at Sadler's Wells Theatre, Leicester Haymarket, and was nominated for the Critic's Circle Award for Choreography of a Musical. He choreographed 2004's Grand Hotel for the Donmar Warehouse. The production won the Laurence Olivier Award for Outstanding Musical Production at the 2005 Laurence Olivier Awards, with Cooper nominated for Best Choreographer.

In 2005, Cooper and Wildor performed a two-person play, Wallflowering, at the Seven Oaks Playhouse. Their roles were primarily dialogue with intermittent bits of ballroom dancing. Following this, he designed the choreography for the revival of Promises, Promises at Sheffield's Crucible Theatre.

In 2006 Cooper appeared alongside Neil Morrissey and Patrick Swayze playing Sky Masterson in Guys and Dolls at the Piccadilly Theatre, London, and in 2007 he provided the musical staging for Side by Side by Sondheim for The Venue Theatre, London.

2008 saw Cooper's return to the stage, creating the role of Ramon in Zorro the Musical for the UK tour. He also played the Tin Man in the Royal Festival Hall's summer staging of the musical The Wizard of Oz, after which he turned his attention back to choreography. First, he choreographed Carousel for director Lindsay Posner which had a very successful UK tour, prior to a West End run at the Savoy Theatre. Cooper was then asked by Paul Kerryson to direct and choreograph the first new show, Simply Cinderella, at the brand new Curve Theatre, Leicester.

In 2009 Cooper unveiled Shall We Dance at Sadler's Wells, an ambitious all-dance show based on Richard Rodgers' songs. For this production he was the box-office star, director, creator, librettist and choreographer. Later that year, he provided choreography for Lindsay Posner's production of the Donizetti opera Roberto Devereux at the Holland Park Theatre, Kensington, London.

Cooper co-starred in the touring stage version of Irving Berlin's White Christmas during the Christmas season in 2009, 2010, and 2011. He played the role of Phil Davis.

=== 2011 to the present ===
Cooper was the above-the-title star playing the role of Don Lockwood in Jonathan Church's highly successful 2011–2013 production of Singin' in the Rain, with choreography by Andrew Wright. Its first sold-out run was at the Chichester Festival Theatre, followed by a longer run at the Palace Theatre, London. He also performed the iconic Singin' in the Rain scene for the 2011 Royal Variety Performance. The stage show was nominated for the Laurence Olivier Award for Best Musical Revival among several other awards. A cast recording of Singin' in the Rain was issued in 2012. Good Mornin' was performed at the 2012 Olivier Awards Ceremony. The show, starring Cooper, played in Japan for three weeks of November 2014.

In 2013 Cooper choreographed Matthew White's well-received production of Candide at the Menier Chocolate Factory. Reviewer Sam Smith wrote "Adam Cooper's choreography is racy, and the production finds a particular affinity with the 'Surrealism' of the piece." In late 2013 Cooper was invited to Denmark to choreograph Daniel Bohr's Danish language version of Evita at Det Ny Teater (The New Theater) in Copenhagen. The show premiered in January 2014. For Evita, Adam Cooper created a choreography with continuous tango elements merged into the rest of the dance.

Cooper provided the "energetic" 60's choreography for Sunny Afternoon at the Hampstead Theatre in London. The show ran from April to May 2014, and then in October 2014 transferred to the Harold Pinter Theatre in the West End. Its run was extended several times due to its popularity with the audience and positive critical reviews. It was nominated for numerous awards and won 4 Olivier Awards in 2015.

Cooper had another opportunity to present a stage version of Les Liaisons dangereuses (Gefährliche Liebschaften) in 2015. He choreographed and co-directed with Josef E. Köpplinger a German musical version of the novel with a newly commissioned book, lyrics and score for the itinerant Staatstheater am Gärtnerplatz company in Munich, Germany.

In 2019, Cooper appeared in the UK Tour of New Adventures' The Red Shoes, playing the role of Boris Lermontov. In 2021 and 2024, he played the lead role of Zach in Leicester Curve's production of A Chorus Line, which later transferred to Sadler's Wells and toured the UK. He was stage director and choreographer of The Pirates of Penzance (in German) at the Staatstheater am Gärtnerplatz in Munich in November 2024, described by one critic as "very much Pythonesque" and "all in all... a masterfully staged and choreographed production".

== Films and TV ==
- The Soldier's Tale (2010) TV Movie (The Soldier)
- Bourne to Dance (2001) TV Movie (himself)
- Billy Elliot (2000) Arts Council of England, BBC Films, Working Title Films (Billy, Aged 25)
- Madame Bovary (2000) TV Movie (Vicomte)
- The Sandman (2000) Channel 4 TV Movie
- Jason and the Argonauts (2000) Hallmark Entertainment & Panfilm TV Movie (Eros)
- Dance Ballerina Dance (1998) BBC2 TV (himself)
- Swan Lake (Bourne) (1998) PBS Great Performances TV Series with Adventures in Motion Pictures (Swan/Stranger)
- Royal Variety Performance TV Show (1998) Excerpts from Swan Lake (Bourne) (Swan/Stranger)
- The South Bank show: Matthew Bourne's Adventures in Motion Pictures (1997) TV Documentary (himself)
- Swan Lake (Bourne) (1996) BBC/NVC with Adventures in Motion Pictures (Swan/Stranger)
- Mayerling (1994) BBC with the Royal Ballet (Hungarian officer)
- Gala Tribute to Tchaikovsky (1993) TV Special (Pas de deux from Herman Schmerman)
- Winter Dreams (1992) BBC TV with the Royal Ballet (Staff Captain Vassily Vasilyevich Solyony)
- La Bayadère, The Sleeping Beauty (ballet), Winter Gala with Royal Ballet for BBC TV
- Prince of the Pagodas (1990) with the Royal Ballet
- The Merry Wives of Windsor (1982) BBC TV (fairy)

== Other ==
- (2000) National Portrait Gallery, London, portrait of Adam Cooper by Stuart Pearson Wright (oil on gesso on oak panel, NPG 6542)
- (2014) Imperial Classical Ballet Faculty Patrons, Adam Cooper and Sarah Wildor

== Awards ==
Year	Award	Category	Nominated work	Result	Ref.
1988	Royal Ballet School Awards	Ursula Moreton Choreographic Competition		Won	
1989	Prix de Lausanne	Professional Level Prize		Won	
1996	Time Out Awards	Best Dance Performance	Swan Lake	Won	
1997	Evening Standard Ballet, Opera and Classical Music Awards	Outstanding Individual Performance in Ballet	Swan Lake	Won	
1997	Drama League Awards	Best Performance	Swan Lake	Won	
1999	Astaire Awards	Best Dancer	Swan Lake	Won	
1999	Tony Awards	Best Actor in a Musical	Swan Lake	Nominated	
2002	Critics' Circle National Dance Awards	Best Male Dancer	On Your Toes	Nominated	
2003	Critics' Circle National Dance Awards	Best Choreography (Musical Theatre)	On Your Toes	Won	
2003	Critics' Circle National Dance Awards	Audience Award	On Your Toes	Won	
2004	WhatsOnStage Awards	Best Choreographer	On Your Toes	Nominated	
2004	WhatsOnStage Awards	Best Actor in a Musical	On Your Toes	Nominated	
2004	Critics' Circle National Dance Awards	Best Choreography (Musical Theater)	Singin' in the Rain	Nominated	
2005	WhatsOnstage Awards	Best Choreographer	Grand Hotel/Singin' in the Rain	Nominated	
2005	Laurence Olivier Awards	Best Theatre Choreographer	Grand Hotel	Nominated	
2013	WhatsOnStage Awards	Best Actor in a Musical	Singin' in the Rain	Nominated	
