= The Most Incredible Thing =

- Short story by Hans Christian Andersen
- Original title: Det Utroligste
- Translator: Horace Scudder
- Country: Denmark
- Language: Danish
- Genre(s): Literary fairy tale

Publication
- Published in: Nyt Dansk Maanedsskrift
- Publisher: C.A. Reitzel
- Media type: Print
- Publication date: October 1870 (Denmark)
- Published in English: September 1870 (United States)

"The Most Incredible Thing" (Danish: Det Utroligste) is the final literary fairy tale by Danish poet and author Hans Christian Andersen (1805–1875). The story is about a contest to find the most incredible thing and the wondrous consequences when the winner is chosen. The tale was first published in an English translation by Horace Scudder, an American correspondent of Andersen's, in the United States in September 1870 before being published in the original Danish in Denmark in October 1870. "The Most Incredible Thing" was the first of Andersen's tales to be published in Denmark during World War II. Andersen considered the tale one of his best.

== Plot summary ==
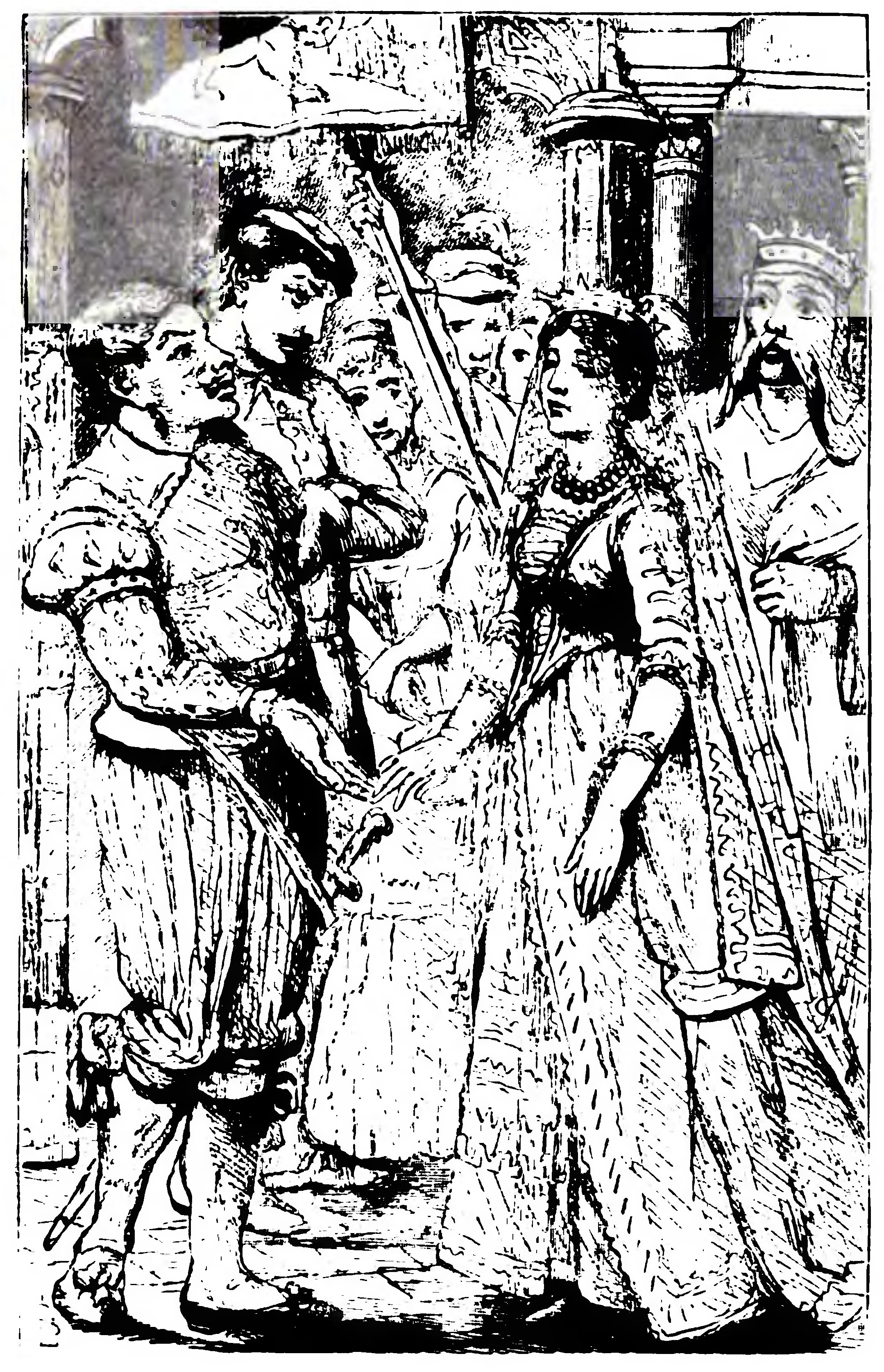
Illustration from the first US publication, in The Riverside Magazine for Young People, September 1870

When the tale begins, a contest has been proclaimed in which half the kingdom and the hand of the princess in marriage will be the rewards of he who can produce the most incredible thing. A poor young man creates a magnificent clock with different lifelike figures — Moses, Adam and Eve, the Four Seasons, the Five Senses, and others — which appear at the stroke of the hour. All agree the clock is the most incredible thing and its creator is named the winner. Suddenly, another man smashes the clock and all then agree that this act is even more incredible than the creation of the beautiful clock. The destroyer is to wed the princess, but at the wedding, the figures of the clock magically reappear, defeat him, and then vanish. All agree that this is the most incredible thing, and the princess and the young creator of the clock marry.

=== The figures ===
Each hour on the clock is represented by a figure from the Bible, mythology, folklore or common knowledge.

- One o'clock: Moses, writing the first of the ten commandments
- Two o'clock: Adam and Eve
- Three o'clock: The Three Wise Men
- Four o'clock: The Four Seasons, represented by a cuckoo bird (spring), a grasshopper (summer), an empty stork's nest (autumn), and an old crow (winter)
- Five o'clock: The Five Senses, represented by a spectacle maker (sight), a coppersmith (hearing), a flower girl (smell), a cook (taste), and an undertaker (touch)
- Six o'clock: A gambler, who always rolled sixes
- Seven o'clock: The seven days of the week, or the seven deadly sins
- Eight o'clock: A choir of eight singing monks
- Nine o'clock: The Muses of Greek mythology
- Ten o'clock: Moses returns with the rest of the Ten Commandments
- Eleven o'clock: Eleven children played and sang "Two and two and seven, the clock has struck eleven"
- Twelve o'clock: A night watchman announces the birth of Christ

== Stage adaptations ==
=== Pet Shop Boys ballet ===
British pop act Pet Shop Boys wrote the music for a ballet based on the story that opened in March 2011 at Sadler's Wells in London. The story was adapted by Matthew Dunster and featured animations created by Tal Rosner. Javier de Frutos choreographed the ballet, starring former Royal Ballet principal Ivan Putrov. The ballet won an Evening Standard Theatre Award and returned to Sadler's Wells for a second season in 2012.

In 2018, the Charlotte Ballet produced and presented the American premiere of the ballet created at Sadler's Wells.

=== Other productions ===
In 2016, the New York City Ballet premiered a one-act ballet based on the same story, choreographed by Justin Peck with music by Bryce Dessner.

== See also ==
- List of works by Hans Christian Andersen
