= Sarah Wildor =

English ballet dancer (born 1972)

- Born: 1972 (age 53–54); Eastwood, Essex, England
- Occupations: Ballerina, theatre dancer
- Spouse: Adam Cooper (m. 2000)
- Children: 2

Sarah Wildor (born 1972) is an English ballet dancer. She is most noted as a former principal dancer with The Royal Ballet, a leading international ballet company based at the Royal Opera House in Covent Garden, London.

== Background ==
Wildor was born in 1972 in Eastwood, Essex, England. She received her professional dance training at both the lower and upper schools of the Royal Ballet School. She joined The Royal Ballet in 1991, was promoted to Soloist in 1995, then Principal in 1999. During her career with the Royal Ballet, she was celebrated for her musicality, grace, intensity and personality. She resigned from the Royal Ballet in 2001 to freelance and expand into Musical Theater and acting.

Wildor married the actor, dancer, choreographer (and former Royal Ballet principal) Adam Cooper in 2000 and they have two children.

== Selected repertoire with Royal Ballet ==
=== Productions by Dame Ninette de Valois ===
- Coppélia

=== Productions by Sir Frederick Ashton ===
- Cinderella
- Daphnis and Chloë
- Enigma Variations
- La Fille mal gardée
- Ondine
- Rhapsody
- The Dream

=== Productions by Sir Kenneth MacMillan ===
- Anastasia
- Concerto
- Gloria
- The Invitation
- Manon
- Romeo and Juliet

=== Productions by Sir Peter Wright ===
- Giselle
- The Nutcracker

== Freelance dancer ==
Wildor took a leave of absence from the Royal Ballet in 1997 to play the lead in Matthew Bourne's Cinderella in London and in Los Angeles.

Upon leaving the Royal Ballet in 2001, after a decade at Covent Garden, Wildor guest-starred with Scottish Ballet. She played the Young Girl in the company's revival of Frederick Ashton's 1961 The Two Pigeons. It opened at the Edinburgh Festival Theatre in 2002.

Later in 2002 Wildor together with Adam Cooper presented a tribute to Sir Kenneth MacMillan at Exeter and in Japan.

Wildor played the role of Madame de Tourvel in a newly interpreted, 2005 production of Les Liaisons dangereuses. This version was conceived as a mixture of mime and dance. It was co-directed by Adam Cooper and Lez Brotherston, and choreographed by Cooper who also played the role of Viscomte de Valmont. The piece premiered in Japan early in the year before a summer season at Sadler's Wells.

== Musical theatre ==
Her first role in musical theatre was in 2002 in Susan Stroman's dance musical Contact and she was nominated for a Laurence Olivier Award for Best Actress in a Musical.

She followed with the female lead role in the 2003 production of On Your Toes, with Adam Cooper providing the choreography and playing the male lead. Most notable was their duet to Richard Rodgers 'Slaughter on 10th Avenue'. Wildor played the vampish Russian ballerina Vera Baronova, the role in which Natalia Makarova made a huge impact in the last London production 20 years ago.

In 2009 she and Cooper again danced the famous 'Slaughter on 10th Avenue' ballet (to different choreography) in a show called Shall We Dance, conceived by Adam Cooper. This stage production was an ambitious all-dance show based on Richard Rodgers' songs and was directed and choreographed by Cooper. It was performed at Sadler's Wells.

== Theatre ==
She played Elizabeth in the 2004 Joseph Wright's production of Frankenstein (based on the Mary Shelley classic) at the Derby Playhouse. Reviewer Alfred Hicklin says: "Sarah Wildor's willowy Elizabeth is particularly impressive, given that she has little to do but wring her hands in despair; the accomplishment of her gestural language is testament to her former career as a principal with the Royal Ballet."

Wildor appeared in Shakespeare's A Midsummer Night's Dream.

Sarah Wildor and Adam Cooper appeared in 2005 at the Seven Oaks Playhouse in a new production of Australian Peta Murray's 1991 two-hander Wallflowering under Julian Woolford's direction. They played a suburban Australian couple in Murray's comedy about love, marriage and ballroom dancing. The play includes short dance sequences, which counterpoint the dialogue scenes, and there is a continuous alternation between speech and dance.

Wildor played an "awful dancer" in director Gavin McAlinden's 2007 production of You Can't Take it With You at Southwark Playhouse. This is a 1936 Pulitzer Prize-winning comedy from Moss Hart and George S Kaufman.

== Other ==
- Sarah Wildor is a patron of the Imperial Society of Teachers of Dancing Classical Ballet Faculty
- Wildor was one of the judges at the 2014 finals of the Opera House competition of young British dancers.
