= 2011 Evening Standard Theatre Awards =

The 2011 Evening Standard Theatre Awards were announced on 20 November 2011. The shortlist was revealed on 7 November 2011 and the longlist on 19 October 2011.

== Winners, shortlist and longlist ==
= winner

=== Best Play ===
- The Heretic by Richard Bean (Royal Court)
- One Man, Two Guvnors by Richard Bean (National's Lyttelton)
- Becky Shaw by Gina Gionfriddo (Almeida)
- Tribes by Nina Raine (Royal Court)

==== Longlisted ====
- Wittenberg by David Davalos (Gate)
- The Knot of the Heart by David Eldridge (Almeida)
- Remembrance Day by Aleksey Scherbak (Royal Court)

=== Best Director ===
- Mike Leigh for Grief (National's Cottesloe)
- Rob Ashford for Anna Christie (Donmar)
- Dominic Cooke for Chicken Soup with Barley (Royal Court)
- Edward Hall for Richard III & The Comedy of Errors (Propeller at Hampstead)

==== Longlisted ====
- Lucy Bailey for The Beggar's Opera (Open Air Theatre) & Kingdom of Earth (Print Room) & Fabrication (Print Room)
- Danny Boyle for Frankenstein (National's Olivier)
- Declan Donnellan for The Tempest (Cheek By Jowl at Barbican)
- Simon Godwin for The Acid Test (Royal Court)
- Michael Grandage for Luise Miller (Donmar)
- Sean Holmes for Saved (Lyric Hammersmith)
- Sam Mendes for Richard III (Old Vic)
- Roger Michell for Tribes (Royal Court)
- Rufus Norris for London Road (National's Cottesloe)
- Trevor Nunn for Flare Path (Theatre Royal Haymarket)
- Bijan Sheibani for The Kitchen (National's Olivier)
- Max Stafford-Clark for Top Girls (Chichester's Minerva & Trafalgar Studios)
- Jessica Swale for The Belle's Stratagem (Southwark Playhouse)
- Matthew Warchus for Matilda the Musical (RSC Stratford & Cambridge Theatre)
- Nicholas Hytner for One Man, Two Guvnors (National Theatre)

=== Best Actor ===
- Benedict Cumberbatch, Frankenstein (National's Olivier)
- Jonny Lee Miller, Frankenstein (National's Olivier)
- Bertie Carvel, Matilda the Musical (RSC Stratford & Cambridge Theatre)
- Charles Edwards, Much Ado About Nothing (Shakespeare's Globe)

==== Longlisted ====
- Richard Clothier, Richard III (Propeller at Hampstead)
- James Corden, One Man, Two Guvnors (National's Lyttelton)
- Ralph Fiennes, The Tempest (Theatre Royal Haymarket)
- Harry Hadden-Paton, Flare Path (Theatre Royal Haymarket)
- Derek Jacobi, King Lear (Donmar)
- Jude Law, Anna Christie (Donmar)
- Kevin Spacey, Richard III (Old Vic)
- Dominic West, Butley (Duchess)

=== Natasha Richardson Award for Best Actress ===
- Sheridan Smith, Flare Path (Theatre Royal Haymarket)
- Samantha Spiro, Chicken Soup with Barley (Royal Court)
- Kristin Scott Thomas, Betrayal (Comedy)

==== Longlisted ====
- Gemma Arterton, The Master Builder (Almeida)
- Tracie Bennett, End of the Rainbow (Trafalgar Studios)
- Eve Best, Much Ado About Nothing (Shakespeare's Globe)
- Lisa Dillon, The Knot of the Heart (Almeida)
- Haydn Gwynne, Richard III (Old Vic)
- Lesley Manville, Grief (National's Cottesloe)
- Sinead Matthews, Ecstasy (Hampstead)
- Ruth Negga, The Playboy of the Western World (Old Vic)
- Imelda Staunton, A Delicate Balance (Almeida)
- Michelle Terry, Tribes (Royal Court)
- Tracey Ullman, My City (Almeida)
- Ruth Wilson, Anna Christie (Donmar)

=== Ned Sherrin Award for Best Musical ===
- Matilda the Musical, RSC Stratford & Cambridge Theatre
- Betty Blue Eyes, Novello Theatre
- London Road, National's Cottesloe

==== Longlisted ====
- Crazy for You, Open Air Theatre
- Fela!, National's Olivier
- Parade, Southwark Playhouse
- Woody Sez, Arts Theatre

=== Best Design ===
- Adam Cork, sound designer of Anna Christie & King Lear (Donmar)
- Bunny Christie, Men Should Weep (National's Lyttelton)
- Lizzie Clachan, Wastwater (Royal Court)
- Mark Tildesley, Frankenstein (National's Olivier)

==== Longlisted ====
- Paul Barritt, The Animals and Children Took to the Streets (BAC)
- Jon Bausor, Lord of the Flies (Open Air Theatre)
- Giles Cadle, The Kitchen (National's Olivier)
- William Dudley, Snake in the Grass (Print Room)

=== Charles Wintour Award for Most Promising Playwright ===
- Penelope Skinner, The Village Bike (Royal Court)
- EV Crowe, 'Kin' (Royal Court)
- Vivienne Franzmann, Mogadishu (Lyric Hammersmith)

==== Longlisted ====
- Tom Basden, Joseph K (Gate)
- Jesse Briton, 'Bound' (Southwark Playhouse)
- Ella Hickson, Precious Little Talent (Trafalgar Studios)
- Morgan Lloyd Malcolm, Belongings (Hampstead & Trafalgar Studios)

=== Milton Shulman Award for Outstanding Newcomer ===
- Kyle Soller for his performances in The Glass Menagerie (Young Vic) & The Government Inspector (Young Vic) & The Faith Machine (Royal Court)
- Phoebe Fox for her performances in As You Like It (Rose Kingston) and The Acid Test (Royal Court) & There Is A War (National's Paintframe)
- Malachi Kirby for his performance in Mogadishu (Lyric, Hammersmith)
- David Wilson Barnes for his performance in Becky Shaw (Almeida)

==== Longlisted ====
- 1927 (company) for their production of The Animals and Children Took to the Streets (BAC)
- Robyn Addison for her performances in The Rivals (Theatre Royal Bath/ Theatre Royal Haymarket) & Mongrel Island (Soho)
- Tom Byam Shaw for his performances in Les Parents Terribles (Donmar at Trafalgar Studios) and The Tempest (Theatre Royal Haymarket)
- Joseph Drake for his performance in Kingdom of Earth (Print Room)
- Johnny Flynn for his performance in The Heretic (Royal Court)
- Vanessa Kirby for her performance in The Acid Test (Royal Court)
- David Mercatali for his direction of Tender Napalm (Southwark Playhouse)
- Chris Rolls for his direction of Les Parents Terribles (Donmar at Trafalgar Studios)
- Thom Southerland for his direction of Parade (Southwark Playhouse)

=== Editor's Award ===
- Michael Grandage for making the Donmar Warehouse a star

=== Beyond Theatre Award ===
- Pet Shop Boys and Javier de Frutos for The Most Incredible Thing (Sadler's Wells)

=== Lebedev Special Award ===
- Kristin Scott Thomas for her contribution to theatre

=== Moscow Art Theatre's Golden Seagull ===
- Tom Stoppard for his contribution to Russian theatre and the international stage

== Judges ==
- Sarah Sands, London Evening Standard
- Henry Hitchings, London Evening Standard
- Georgina Brown, Mail on Sunday
- Susannah Clapp, The Observer
- Charles Spencer, Daily Telegraph
- Libby Purves, The Times
- Matt Wolf, International Herald Tribune
- Evgeny Lebedev, chairman of the Evening Standard
