= The Most Incredible Thing (album) =

Soundtrack album by Tennant/Lowe
- Released: 14 March 2011
- Recorded: 2008–2010
- Venue: Concert Hall of Polish Radio (Wrocław, Poland) (Note: Orchestra recording)
- Genre: Electronic; classical
- Length: 83:33
- Label: Parlophone
- Producer: Pet Shop Boys; Sven Helbig

Pet Shop Boys chronology
Ultimate (2010)	The Most Incredible Thing (2011)	Format (2012)

The Most Incredible Thing is the score for the 2011 ballet of the same name, based on the eponymous 1870 fairy tale by Danish author Hans Christian Andersen. The music is written and performed by Neil Tennant and Chris Lowe of English synth-pop duo Pet Shop Boys, with orchestrations by Sven Helbig played by the Wrocław Score Orchestra. The album was released on 14 March 2011 by Parlophone. The ballet premiered in March 2011 at Sadler's Wells Theatre in London, with a revival and tour in 2012 and a subsequent production by the Charlotte Ballet in the United States in 2018.

== Background and composition ==
In 2007, Lowe read a collection of Hans Christian Andersen's fairy tales and thought this story—about a competition to invent "the most incredible thing" to win the hand of a Princess in marriage and half of the Kingdom—would be a good narrative for a ballet, similar to classic works by Tchaikovsky. He mentioned the idea to Tennant, who had recently been contacted by Ivan Putrov, a principal dancer for The Royal Ballet, with a request for a 20-minute piece of dance music from Pet Shop Boys. The duo decided instead to compose a full-length ballet in three acts. Sadler's Wells Theatre in London took on the production and engaged Matthew Dunster to write a scenario for the ballet, like a map for the music to follow.

Tennant and Lowe composed most of Act One in autumn 2008 and the rest of the score in 2010. The work combines electronic music and orchestra. Sven Helbig, who had produced the duo's film score to Battleship Potemkin, wrote the orchestrations for the ballet. The Wrocław Score Orchestra, conducted by Dominic Wheeler, recorded the orchestrations at the Concert Hall of Polish Radio in late 2010.

Choreographer Javier de Frutos described the ballet score as reminiscent of Russian Constructivism as well as marches and military music. Variety reviewer Karen Fricker noted the duo's recognisable synth sounds and pleasing melodies, particularly the love theme of the Princess and her suitor, Leo. The track titled "The Grind" includes a portion of a Pet Shop Boys song, "Baby", which the Princess dances to while confined in her room. (Note: Originally written in 2003, the full demo of "Baby" was released in 2012 as a bonus track on the single "Leaving". It had previously been recorded by the Swedish band Alcazar and appeared on their 2009 album Disco Defenders.) "The Clock" sequence in the score, at 26 minutes, was the longest piece the duo had ever written; Tennant likened it to a DJ mix. It incorporates the ticking of a clock—one of the inventions for the competition—in the rhythm of a metronome.

Tennant and Lowe said, "This is a very exciting project to be part of. In the past we have written dance music so to write music for a ballet seems like a logical development. Also we have always been fascinated by giving our music a theatrical context."

== Ballet ==
The Most Incredible Thing
- Choreographer: Javier de Frutos
- Music: Neil Tennant; Chris Lowe
- Libretto: Matthew Dunster
- Based on: "The Most Incredible Thing" by Hans Christian Andersen
- Premiere: 22 March 2011; Sadler's Wells Theatre (London)
- Characters: Karl; Princess; Leo
- Design: Katrina Lindsay
- Setting: Fairy-tale kingdom
- Created for: Ivan Putrov
- Genre: Narrative ballet
- Type: Contemporary ballet

After four public preview performances, The Most Incredible Thing had its official opening on 22 March 2011 at Sadler's Wells in London. Performances continued until 26 March, and all tickets were sold out. The entire production was filmed by the BBC and broadcast on BBC Four on 1 July 2011. The Most Incredible Thing returned to Sadler's Wells in 2012 for 15 performances, from 25 March to 7 April, prior to going on tour to several UK cities. In 2018, the Charlotte Ballet in North Carolina staged a production of the ballet, using the Pet Shop Boys' recording instead of a live orchestra.

Pet Shop Boys and Javier de Frutos won the inaugural Beyond Theatre Award, for creating innovative productions that cross genres and boundaries, at the 2011 Evening Standard Theatre Awards.

=== Synopsis ===
Life in the Kingdom is joyless and monotonous under the supervision of Karl, a military officer. The King announces a competition to invent the most incredible thing for the prize of half his Kingdom and the hand of his free-spirited daughter in marriage. The announcement causes excitement in the Kingdom for the first time in years. Leo, an artistic dreamer, hopes to save the Princess by winning the contest, while power-hungry Karl plots to turn things to his advantage.

Contestants present their ideas for the most incredible thing, but all are rejected. Then Leo reveals his invention: a clock that displays 12 amazing visions, one for each hour. Leo is declared the winner. Karl, consumed by jealousy, smashes the clock. The judges decide his destructive act is the most incredible thing, and the Princess is forced to marry him instead. The citizens return to their daily grind. Leo is put in prison, where he is visited by three muses who help him rebuild his clock.

These spirits drive Karl to his death, proving that the power of creativity will always defeat the forces of destruction. The darkness of the kingdom is filled with color and light as Leo and Princess are reunited. There is a new, joyous ceremony for Leo and Princess’ wedding. And the most incredible thing is: no one is jealous.

The original production was in three acts, with the second act centered on the clock. In 2012, the ballet was streamlined into two acts, with the interval immediately following the clock's 12 visions.

=== Production ===
The original London production starred Ivan Putrov as Karl, Clemmie Sveaas as the Princess, and Aaron Sillis as Leo. In Charlotte, those roles were played by Anson Zwingelberg, Chelsea Dumas, and Josh Hall.

The production, designed by Katrina Lindsay, followed through on the Constructivist theme of the score, with Soviet-style lettering and graphics and angular sets, conveying a sense of conformity. "The Grind" scene showed workers moving like automatons, dressed in boilersuits reminiscent of the Pet Shop Boys' video for "Go West". The contest was depicted as a reality competition in the vein of Britain's Got Talent. "The Clock" sequence featured animations by Tal Rosner as a backdrop for the dancers to enact scenes such as Adam and Eve, the seven deadly sins, and a pregnant woman with an ultrasound projection for nine o'clock.

The choreography by Javier de Frutos blended classical and modern elements. The pas de deux between the Princess and Leo had a neoclassical style. De Frutos incorporated several homages to notable choreographers, including the women resting their heads on each other from Les Noces (1923), choreographed by Bronislava Nijinska, and the poses of the three muses from Apollo (1928) by George Balanchine. In the Ten Commandments portion of "The Clock", dancers formed patterns in the style of Busby Berkeley, shown from overhead. Shadow projections were used as a tribute to the Pilobolus dance company; for the Charlotte production, Pilobolus recreated them on film.

== Release ==
The album was released as a double CD on 14 March 2011, prior to the ballet opening. In the United States, The Most Incredible Thing was released by Astralwerks on 22 March 2011.

=== Artwork ===
The album cover image (pictured) is based on one of Hans Christian Andersen's own paper-cuts, showing a dancer who appears to have a broken arm. Tennant had recalled a Penguin Classics collection of Andersen's fairy tales from his childhood, illustrated with the author's paper-cuts. He found the dancer image online and chose it to represent a part of the invention that is destroyed during the competition.

=== Limited edition ===
An exclusive, limited art edition—with 500 copies available worldwide, each hand-numbered and signed by the Pet Shop Boys—was released in May 2011. Designed by Mark Farrow, this release features music and artwork exclusive to The Vinyl Factory's edition.

A silk cloth-bound hardboard slipcase contains a hardback book with seven record sleeves. Six of these house heavyweight 180-gram vinyl records pressed on the EMI 1400. The records feature the Pet Shop Boys' music for the ballet, as well as the original demo versions of each of the compositions, only available in this release. The seventh sleeve contains an oversized foldout sheet music print, signed by Tennant and Lowe. The ballet's synopsis is printed onto the record sleeves so that each has an accompanying narrative that reads like a storybook.

== Critical reception ==
Professional ratings
Aggregate scores
Source	Rating
AnyDecentMusic?	6.6/10
Metacritic	66/100
Review scores
Source	Rating
AllMusic	3/5 stars
The A.V. Club	C+
The Independent	4/5 stars
The Irish Times	3/5 stars
MusicOMH	3/5 stars
PopMatters	7/10
Rave	3.5/5 stars
Virgin Media	8/10

The album received generally positive reviews from music critics. At Metacritic, which assigns a normalised rating out of 100 to reviews from mainstream publications, The Most Incredible Thing received an average score of 66, based on seven reviews. The Independent's Andy Gill called the album "stylistically wide-ranging" and stated that "this second foray into theatrical composition [...] is vastly more adept [than Closer to Heaven], involving the deft interweaving of electropop and orchestral elements within a series of impressionistic tableaux sketching out the theme of conflict between creativity and destruction." John Garratt of PopMatters opined that "somewhere between Tennant and Lowe's writing and Helbig's arrangements, there are some subtlety interesting things going on here." He continued, "It's doubtful that anyone will be humming the themes of The Most Incredible Thing in the future the way people can hum The Nutcracker today. But Neil Tennant and Chris Lowe sure do know their stuff." Lauren Murphy of The Irish Times noted that the score contains "numerous formal classical interludes, but it's the iconic duo's own distinctive disco/electropop sound that's branded most heavily on this score", adding that "[i]t's off-putting to hear such distinct worlds colliding, but also startling, oddly compelling, and undeniably ambitious." BBC Music critic Tom Hocknell commented that the album's "minimal orchestration never drowns the listener; strings sweep and chords portend, without any track outstaying its welcome." Hocknell also believed that it "doubtlessly works better as a full performance, but as a stand-alone soundtrack has wonderful moments nonetheless."

Alasdair Duncan of Australian music magazine Rave described the album as "well-constructed and enjoyable, suffused with the kind of wit and sophistication you'd expect from Neil Tennant and Chris Lowe, even if the lack of context means that it sometimes just drifts by in an agreeable haze." Matthew Laidlow of Virgin Media expressed that "[p]eople might be disappointed with the lack of vocals from Neil Tennant, but you have to remember that this isn't a Pet Shop Boys album, instead a successful collaboration that is on par with material they've previously released." AllMusic's David Jeffries viewed that "any fans who found the duo's Battleship Potemkin soundtrack compelling will find this a welcome, lighter alternative, seeing as how the sound is another mashing of Russian classical music and synth pop", concluding that the album is "[o]f limited appeal, but appealing nonetheless". Ben Hogwood of MusicOMH remarked, "For sure there are plot signposts, when themes transfer unexpectedly from floated euro trance to orchestral swing, but without a synopsis or a visual guide these transfers can prove unsettling and sometimes clunky." Hogwood did, however, state that "there is some music of great beauty here." In a review for The A.V. Club, Marc Hawthorne felt that "while there are some synth surges and gay-disco thumps over the course of this predominantly instrumental 82-minute orchestral score [...] it doesn't really line up with what's expected of Tennant and Lowe." He also critiqued, "Even more problematic is that the music, while ambitious and appropriately dramatic, hardly approaches standalone greatness." The Observer's Hermione Hoby was unimpressed, writing, "The ballet that Tennant and Chris Lowe have scored [...] is based on a story by Hans Christian Andersen rather than George Lucas, but ominous melodrama prevails nonetheless, even when it comes via disco rather than dense orchestration. It's hard not to wonder what the dancers might be doing to all this and, as with Tennant's voice (which makes only a brief appearance), their absence is frustrating."

== Track listing ==
All tracks written and composed by Neil Tennant and Chris Lowe.

=== Disc one ===
Act One
No.	Title	Length
1.	"Prologue"	1:48
2.	"The Grind"	7:10
3.	"The Challenge"	3:56
4.	"Help Me"	2:10
5.	"Risk"	5:31
6.	"Physical Jerks"	3:41
7.	"The Competition"	6:47
8.	"The Meeting"	2:52

Act Two
No.	Title	Length
9.	"The Clock 1/2/3"	5:47
10.	"The Clock 4/5/6"	4:01
11.	"The Clock 7/8/9"	6:24
12.	"The Clock 10/11/12"	6:29
13.	"The Winner"	2:15
14.	"Destruction"	4:11

=== Disc two ===
Act Three
No.	Title	Length
1.	"Back to the Grind"	5:19
2.	"The Miracle – Ceremony"	1:48
3.	"The Miracle – Revolution"	2:45
4.	"The Miracle – Resurrection"	2:17
5.	"The Miracle – Colour and Light"	3:00
6.	"The Miracle – The Meeting (Reprise)"	2:00
7.	"The Wedding"	3:22

== Personnel ==
Credits adapted from the liner notes of The Most Incredible Thing.

- Pet Shop Boys – performance, production, design, art direction, booklet scenario and background
- Wrocław Score Orchestra – performance
- Dominic Wheeler – conducting
- Sven Helbig – production, orchestrations
- Chris Lowe – programming
- Pete Gleadall – programming
- Bartek Bober – concertmaster
- Joris Bartsch Buhle – contractor
- Andreas Gundlach – piano on "Help Me"
- Teldex Studio Berlin – orchestra recording
- Tobias Lehmann – sound engineering, editing
- Tom Russbüldt – Pro Tools engineering
- Dietrich Zöllner – copyist
- Jan-Peter Klöpfel – copyist
- Bob Kraushaar – mixing (at Acton Marina, London)
- Farrow – design, art direction, cover illustration (based on an original paper-cut by Hans Christian Andersen)

== Charts ==
Chart (2011)	Peak position
Croatian International Albums (HDU)	29
Dutch Albums (Album Top 100)	61
German Albums (Offizielle Top 100)	36
Scottish Albums (OCC)	91
Spanish Albums (PROMUSICAE)	69
Swedish Albums (Sverigetopplistan)	45
UK Albums (OCC)	57
