= Elmhurst Ballet School =

Coordinates: 52.4542°N 1.9127°W

Location
- 249 Bristol Road; Edgbaston; Birmingham, West Midlands, B5 7UH; United Kingdom

Information
- Type: Private school
- Founder: Helen Ida Mortimer
- Local authority: Birmingham
- Specialist: Classical Ballet
- Department for Education URN: 134908 Tables
- President: Wayne McGregor
- Patron: The Queen
- Principal: Jessica Wheeler
- Artistic Director: Robert Parker
- Gender: Coeducational
- Age: 11 to 19
- Enrolment: 189
- Website: http://www.elmhurstdance.co.uk

Elmhurst Ballet School is an independent boarding school for professional classical ballet in the United Kingdom. It takes students aged 11–19 years who intend to pursue a career in professional classical ballet. Elmhurst provides a full academic day in conjunction with a full vocational training course in ballet and dance.

== History ==
One of the earliest vocational dance schools in the United Kingdom, Elmhurst was established in 1923 in Camberley, Surrey, by Mrs Helen Ida Mortimer in the grounds of the Prep School run by Miss Violet Crisp. The school moved to purpose-built premises in Edgbaston, Birmingham in 2004. The facilities occupy an area of 5 acres (20,000 m^{2}) and include a 250-seat studio theatre, a theatre workshop and seven dance studios. There is also a medical centre and a physiotherapy/exercise centre. In addition to day students, there is on-site boarding accommodation for up to 121 resident students and off-site boarding for 30 sixth-formers.

Robert Parker, a former Birmingham Royal Ballet principal dancer, has been artistic director since 2012.

== Staff and former staff ==
- Mary Goodhew, former Artistic Director
- Robert Parker, Artistic Director
- Alfreda Thorogood, Artistic Director
- Pamela Motley Verrall, music teacher
- Jessica Wheeler, Principal

== Notable alumni ==
- Jenny Agutter
- Melissa Hamilton
- Helen Baxendale
- Hetty Baynes
- Sarah Brightman
- Tracey Childs
- Thomas Forster
- Fiona Fullerton
- Imogen Hassall
- Jacqueline Chan
- Caroline Langrishe
- Tanja Liedtke
- Jennie Linden
- Deborah Makepeace
- Hayley Mills
- Juliet Mills
- Pamela Franklin
- Dame Merle Park
- Polly Parsons
- Prunella Ransome
- Paul James Rooney
- Hermione Norris
- Jane Slaughter
- Tessa Wyatt
- Lorna Yabsley
