= National Dance Awards 2003 =

Dance awards from The Critics' Circle

The National Dance Awards 2003, were organised and presented by The Critics' Circle, and were awarded to recognise excellence in professional dance in the United Kingdom. The ceremony was held at Sadler's Wells Theatre, London, on 13 January 2004, with awards given for productions staged in the previous year.

== Awards presented ==
- De Valois Award for Outstanding Achievement in Dance - Val Bourne, Artistic Director of Dance Umbrella
- Best Male Dancer - Carlos Acosta of The Royal Ballet
- Best Female Dancer - Zenaida Yanowsky of The Royal Ballet
- Audience Award - Adam Cooper
- Sunday Express Children's Award - Harry Walker, Tap Dancer
- Dance UK Industry Award - Theresa Beattie, Director of Artist Development at The Place
- Best Choreography (Classical) - Michael Corder for English National Ballet
- Best Choreography (Modern) - Akram Khan, for his own company
- Best Choreography (Musical Theatre) - Adam Cooper for On Your Toes
- Outstanding Female Artist (Modern) - Ana Lujan Sanchez of Rambert Dance Company
- Outstanding Male Artist (Modern) - Henry Montes of Siobhan Davies Dance Company
- Outstanding Female Artist (Classical) - Oxana Panchenko of George Piper Dances
- Outstanding Male Artist (Classical) - Robert Parker of Birmingham Royal Ballet
- Company Prize for Outstanding Repertoire (Classical) - English National Ballet
- Company Prize for Outstanding Repertoire (Modern) - Scottish Dance Theatre
- Best Foreign Dance Company - Paul Taylor Dance Company from United States of America

== Special awards ==
Special awards were presented to the following people for excellence in their particular field of dance that would not be recognised by existing award categories.

- Lez Brotherston, Designer
