= Thomas Forster (dancer) =

English ballet dancer (born 1986)

- Born: 1986 (age 38–39); London, England
- Education: Elmhurst School for Dance; Royal Ballet Upper School
- Occupation: ballet dancer
- Years active: 2006-present
- Spouse: Leann Underwood
- Children: 1
- Career
- Current group: American Ballet Theatre

Thomas Alfred Forster MBE (born 1986) is an English ballet dancer who is currently a principal dancer with the American Ballet Theatre.

Forster was born in London. He was first sent to study ballet as his mother believed it would help his karate training. His ballet teacher then recommended him to be a Junior Associate with The Royal Ballet School. At age 11, as the Royal Ballet Lower School did not offer him a spot, he started full-time training at Elmhurst School for Dance in Birmingham, where he stayed for five years. In 2002, Forster returned to London to train at the Royal Ballet Upper School.

In 2006, Forster moved to New York City to join the American Ballet Theatre Studio Company, became an apprentice with the main company in January 2007 and was taken to the corps de ballet in December. As a corps dancer he partnered with principal dancer Julie Kent in Jardin aux lilas when his scheduled partner was injured. He was made soloist in 2015 and principal dancer in 2020. Forster is also a National Academy of Sports Medicine certified personal trainer, and trains his colleagues at ABT.

Forster is married to fellow ABT dancer Leann Underwood and has a son.
