= Sven Helbig =

German composer, director, and music producer

Background information
- Born: 30 October 1968; Eisenhüttenstadt, East Germany
- Genres: Orchestral; modern classical; choral; electronic
- Occupations: Composer; record producer; arranger
- Years active: 1990s–present
- Labels: Deutsche Grammophon; Neue Meister; Modern
- Website: svenhelbig.com

Sven Helbig (born 30 October 1968) is a German composer, director and music producer known for his genre-crossing works that blend classical music with electronic and contemporary elements. His compositions have been performed by renowned ensembles and orchestras around the world, including the Vienna Symphony Orchestra, the Staatskapelle Dresden, the BBC Singers, the Fauré Quartet, the London Contemporary Orchestra, and many others.

Helbig's versatility has made him a much sought-after collaborator for crossover projects; he has worked as a producer, composer and arranger with Rammstein, Pet Shop Boys, Snoop Dogg, cellist Jan Vogler, opera singer René Pape, pianist Olga Scheps and more. Helbig's work builds on the tradition of the Gesamtkunstwerk (all-embracing art form) and he often takes responsibility for concept, music and production at the same time.

== Biography ==
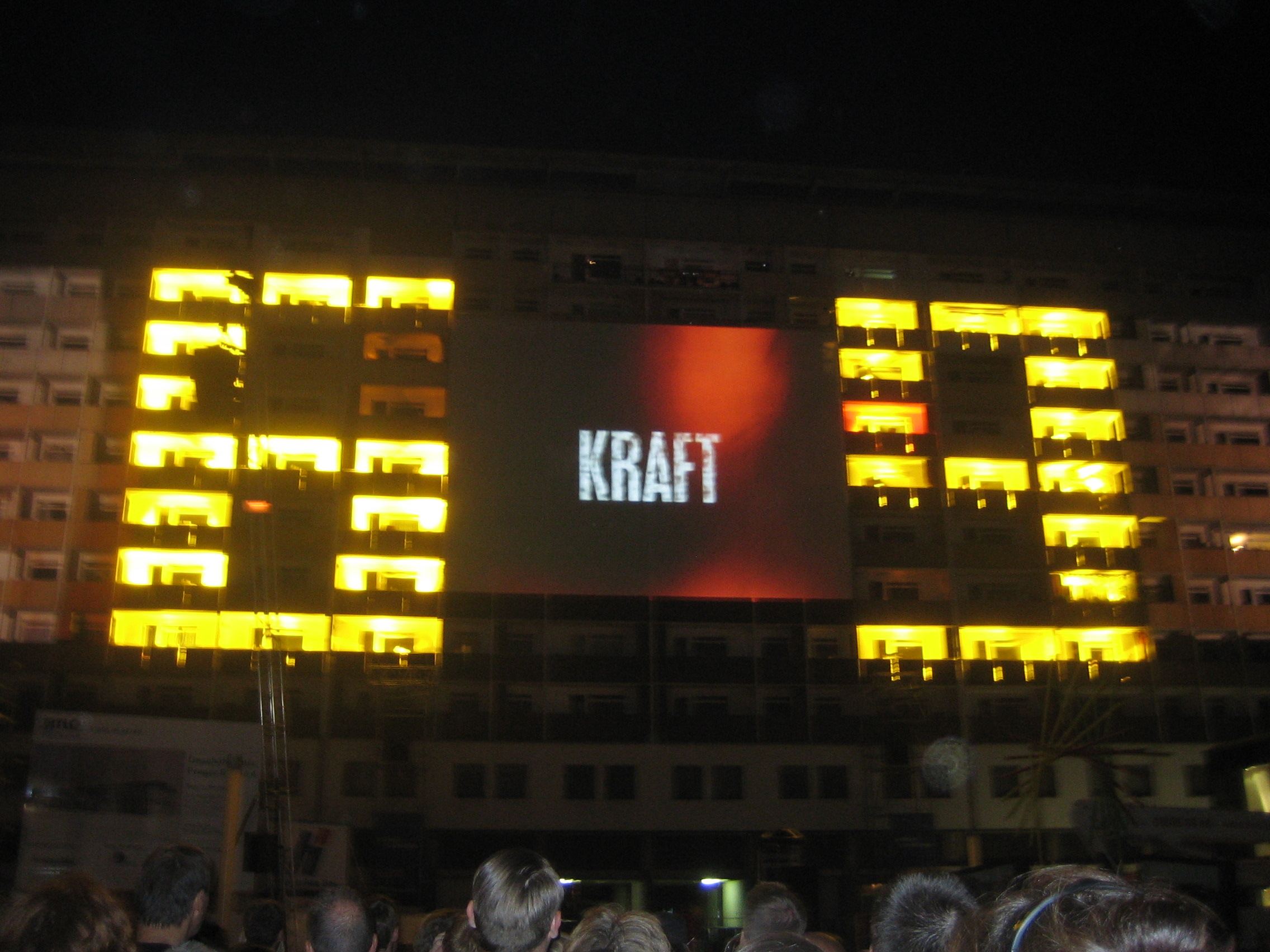
800th anniversary of Dresden, July 2006

Helbig was born in 1968 and grew up in Eisenhüttenstadt, East Germany. His first experience with music began with the clarinet, later he added guitar, piano and drums. In 1996, Helbig and hornist Markus Rindt founded the Dresden Symphony Orchestra. The orchestra is specialized in new, symphonic music in unusual productions and was the first European symphony orchestra to exclusively perform contemporary music.

The self-taught composer's acclaimed debut album Pocket Symphonies has been released on the Deutsche Grammophon label. Since 2016, Helbig is playing live with his Forrklang Quartet. The ensemble is individually formed to fit the need of his current concert program. In 2017 he toured Europe, North- and Southamerica with his choir work I Eat the Sun and Drink the Rain. The production for choir, electronics and visuals has been staged at Milton Court Hall/London, Elbphilharmonie/Hamburg and Reina Sofia Hall/Madrid beside others. In 2025, a new arrangement for men's choir has been premiered in Basel, Switzerland.

In recent years, the artist has delved into work as a director. He directed music videos, stage shows and theatrical multimedia events. For example, he produced the High-rise Symphony on Dresden's 800th anniversary during which the orchestra's musicians sat on individual balconies of an old East German apartment building.

Since 2017, Sven hosts his weekly radio show Schöne Töne on Berlin's Radio 1, celebrating music history and contemporary artists. In 2022 he was honored with the Art Award by the city of Dresden.

The cover artwork he created in the style of 17th century vanitas painting for his album Skills (2022) was shown in a joint exhibition with Gerhard Richter, Tony Cragg and William Kentridge.

In 2025, he released Requiem A on Deutsche Grammophon, based largely on his own texts. The work was premiered on February 9, 2025, in Dresden with the Staatskapelle Dresden, the Dresdner Kreuzchor, and opera singer René Pape. To mark the 80th anniversary of the end of World War II, the piece was performed before an audience of 7,000 at Vienna’s Heldenplatz together with the Wiener Symphoniker, and in October it was presented at London’s Westminster Central Hall.

== Discography ==
Albums under Sven Helbig

- 2013: Album "Pocket Symphonies" - (composer) Deutsche Grammophon
- 2016: Album "Pocket Symphonies Electronica" - (composer)
- 2016: Album "I Eat the Sun and Drink the Rain" - with Vocalconsort Berlin and Kristjan Järvi (composer, lyrics)
- 2018: EP "Tres Momentos" - piece for string orchestra and electronics with the Kammerorchester Berlin (composer)
- 2020: Cello Concerto "Three Continents" - Jan Vogler ( Cello) - (composer) Sony Classical
- 2022: Album "Skills" - (composer)
- 2025: Album Requiem A – (composer, lyrics), Work for Choir, Symphonie Orchester, Soloist (Bass) and Electronics, with René Pape, Staatskapelle Dresden, Dresdner Kreuzchor, Deutsche Grammophon

Albums as Producer or Arranger

- 2003: Album “Mein Herz brennt” - Torsten Rasch with René Pape and Katharina Thalbach, released by Deutsche Grammophon (producer)
- 2004: Album “The Battleship Potemkin” - Pet Shop Boys (producer)
- 2008: Album “The Color Of Snow” - Polarkreis 18 (orchestra arranger/producer)
- 2009: Album “Liebe ist für alle da” - Rammstein (orchestra and choir arranger)
- 2009: Album “Popsongs” - Fauré Quartett (arranger/producer)
- 2010: MTV Unplugged Sido (rapper) - (arranger/producer)
- 2010: Album "Frei" - Polarkreis 18 (orchestra arranger/producer)
- 2011: Album "The Most Incredible Thing" - Pet Shop Boys (orchestra arranger/producer)
- 2013: Album "Wagner Reloaded-Live in Leipzig" - Apocalyptica (orchestra arranger/producer/writer)
- 2019: Untitled – Rammstein (arranger)
- 2022: Zeit – Rammstein (arranger)
- 2022: Adieu – Rammstein (arranger)

== Projects ==
- 2004: Premiere of The Battleship Potemkin at London's Trafalgar Square
- 2006: Production of the high-rise symphony at Dresden's 800th anniversary (director, light design, music)
- 2006: The Mover Ballet, 250 solar panels danced to his music during the opening ceremony of the world's largest solar park in Arnheim
- 2007: MTV Europe Music Awards (EMA) Snoop Dogg and orchestra (arranger)
- 2011: Premier performance of the ballet The Most Incredible Thing in London at Sadler's Wells Theatre, music by Pet Shop Boys with orchestrations by Sven Helbig
- 2014: A Man from the Future, work for orchestra, choir, speaker and electronics about the life of Alan Turing by Pet Shop Boys, premiered by BBC Proms at Royal Albert Hall, (orchestrations)

== Awards ==
- 2004: ECHO Classical Music Award in the world premier recording category for “Mein Herz brennt” to Torsten Rasch
- 2010: ECHO Classical Music Award in the classical music without borders category for “Popsongs” to the Fauré Quartett
- 2013: Maestro title by the National University San Martín (UNSAM), Buenos Aires
- 2019: Golden Stage Cross by the Ministry of Culture, Lithuania
- 2022: Art Award by the city of Dresden
