= Robert Parker (dancer) =

British dancer

Robert Parker is a British dancer.

He has been Artistic Director of the Elmhurst Ballet School since 2012.

Parker trained at the Royal Ballet School. He joined Birmingham Royal Ballet in 1994. He was promoted to Principal dancer in 1999. Parker was presented with the award of Outstanding Male Artist (Classical) at the National Dance Awards 2003. He was a nominee at the National Dance Awards 2001. Parker was a nominee for the Laurence Olivier Award for Outstanding Achievement in Dance at the 2001 Laurence Olivier Awards.

Parker graduated from Birmingham University with an MPhil in Education in 2011.
