= National Dance Awards 2002 =

The National Dance Awards 2002, were organised and presented by The Critics' Circle, and were awarded to recognise excellence in professional dance in the United Kingdom. The ceremony was held at Sadler's Wells Theatre, London, on 14 January 2003, with awards given for productions staged in the previous year.

== Awards Presented ==
- De Valois Award for Outstanding Achievement in Dance - Christopher Bruce
- Best Male Dancer - Thomas Edur
- Richard Sherrington Award for Best Female Dancer - Alina Cojocaru
- Best Choreography (Classical) - Christopher Hampson for Double Concerto
- Best Choreography (Modern) - Mark Morris for V
- Outstanding Young Female Artist (Modern) - Joanne Fong
- Outstanding Young Male Artist (Modern) - Martin Lindinger
- Best Foreign Dance Company - Mark Morris Dance Group from United States of America
- Outstanding Young Female Artist (Classical) - Marianela Nuñez
- Outstanding Young Male Artist (Classical) - Ivan Putrov
- Company Prize for Outstanding Repertoire (Classical) - Birmingham Royal Ballet
- Company Prize for Outstanding Repertoire (Modern) - Rambert Dance Company

== Special awards ==
Special awards were presented to the following people for excellence in their particular field of dance that would not be recognised by existing award categories.

- Dame Beryl Grey
- Thomas Edur and Agnes Oaks
