= Pamela Motley Verrall =

Welsh composer and educator (1915–1996)

Pamela Motley Verrall (13 August 1915 – 1996) was a Welsh composer and music educator. Her compositions and arrangements for school ensembles were published by Bosworth, Chester Music (now Wise Music), Cramer & Company, Feldman, and Forsyth Publishing.

== Career ==
Verrall was born in Penrhiwceiber, South Wales. Her father was a musician. She attended the University of Wales, receiving a B.A. in music in 1937, and a B.A. in English, German, and Latin in 1938. She also earned a Licentiate of the Royal Academy of Music (LRAM) in London.

Verrall was head of the music departments in various schools in the South East of England, including Aldershot Manor Secondary School, The Winston Churchill School, Woking (mid-1970s), Elmhust Ballet School, Camberley and St. Catherine's School for Girls, Twickenham. She composed at least 90 sacred and secular songs, as well as chamber music and musicals for children which have been performed on radio and television. Her cantata for schools Johnny Appleseed (1971), and her hymn tune Cross Over the Road were perhaps the best known of her works.

== Chamber ==
- Clarinets in Chorus
- Clarinets in Concert
- Seven Romances (clarinet and piano)
- Six Conversations (clarinet and piano)
- Six Dance Duets (recorder and piano)
- Six Miniatures for Recorders
- The Well Tempered Wind Quartet, Bach arrangements for flute, oboe, clarinet and bassoon
- Woodwind Trio (oboe, clarinet and bassoon)

== Theatre ==
- Around the World: Francis Drake
- Babushka (Christmas Play)
- Gingerbread Man
- Grand Tour of Europe
- Johnny Appleseed, for narrator, chorus, dancers and mimers
- Legend of the Yellow River
- Miracle Man
- Move Over, Mr. Noah
- Sea Spell
- Silver Arrow
- Son of Assisi
- Summer Water

== Vocal ==
- Cross over the Road (hymn)
- at least 90 songs
