= Bryony Brind =

British ballerina

Bryony Jane Susan St John Brind (27 May 1960 – 2 December 2015) was a British ballerina and principal dancer with the Royal Ballet.

Brind was born in Plymouth, the elder child of Major Roger Brind RM, and his wife, Jennifer Grey. She started at the Royal Ballet School in 1971 at age 11, and joined the Royal Ballet itself in 1978, developing a supple body and flexibility. One year earlier, in 1977, she won a scholarship at the Prix de Lausanne.

At the 1981 Laurence Olivier Awards, Brind received the Outstanding First Achievement of the Year in Ballet, for her performance in The Royal Ballet's Dances of Albion. In 1981, she danced the lead role in the Royal Ballet's Swan Lake, and her fame increased the next year when she partnered Rudolf Nureyev at Covent Garden in La Bayadere: Kingdom of the Shades. With Nureyev, she also danced the Siren in George Balanchine's The Prodigal Son, and as Miranda in his own ballet of The Tempest. She was promoted to principal in 1984. Brind created roles in Frederick Ashton's Rhapsody (1980), Glen Tetley's Dances of Albion (1980), Kenneth MacMillan's Orpheus (1982), David Bintley's Young Apollo (1984) and Michael Corder's Party Game (1984). Her final lead role was in David Bintley's The Planets in 1990.

In 1991, Brind left The Royal Ballet to pursue a freelance career as a dancer and actress, which included appearances with London City Ballet and Dance Advance. She also taught at the Arts Educational Schools London. She appeared on TV in The Ghosts of Oxford Street and The House of Eliott.

Brind was married twice. Her first husband was Anglo-Greek businessman Skevos Theodorou. The year-long marriage ended in divorce in 1998. Her second marriage, in 2001, was to Ian McCorquodale, son of novelist Dame Barbara Cartland. In her later years, Brind took full-time care of her second husband, following health problems related to his two strokes, and her mother.

Brind died of a heart attack on 2 December 2015, aged 55. Her mother, father and her second husband, Ian McCorquodale survived her.

== Awards ==
- 1977 : Prix de Lausanne; Scholarship
- 1981 : Laurence Olivier Award; Outstanding First Achievement of the Year in Ballet
