= National Dance Awards 2004 =

The National Dance Awards 2004, were organised and presented by The Critics' Circle, and were awarded to recognise excellence in professional dance in the United Kingdom. The ceremony was held at the Royal Opera House, London, on 20 January 2005, with awards given for productions staged in the previous year.

== Awards Presented ==
- De Valois Award for Outstanding Achievement in Dance - Sir Peter Wright, Director Laureate of Birmingham Royal Ballet
- Best Male Dancer - Jonathan Cope, of The Royal Ballet
- Best Female Dancer - Leanne Benjamin, of The Royal Ballet
- Working Title Billy Elliot Prize - Taylor Davies
- Audience Award - Northern Ballet Theatre
- Sunday Express Children's Award - Abbie Hastings
- Dance UK Industry Award - Dick Matchett
- Best Choreography (Classical) - Christopher Wheeldon, for Rush for San Francisco Ballet
- Best Choreography (Modern) - Javier de Frutos, for Elsa Canasta for Rambert Dance Company and Milagros for Royal New Zealand Ballet
- Best Choreography (Musical Theatre) - Matthew Bourne for Play Without Words at the Royal National Theatre
- Outstanding Female Artist (Modern) - Amy Hollingsworth, of Rambert Dance Company
- Outstanding Male Artist (Modern) - Paul Liburd, of Rambert Dance Company
- Outstanding Female Artist (Classical) - Lauren Cuthbertson, of The Royal Ballet
- Outstanding Male Artist (Classical) - Thiago Soares, of The Royal Ballet
- Company Prize for Outstanding Repertoire (Classical) - The Royal Ballet
- Company Prize for Outstanding Repertoire (Modern) - Rambert Dance Company
- Best Foreign Dance Company - Merce Cunningham Dance Company from United States of America

== Special awards ==
No special awards were presented for the 2004 season.
