= Javier de Frutos =

Venezuelan choreographer based in the UK

Javier De Frutos
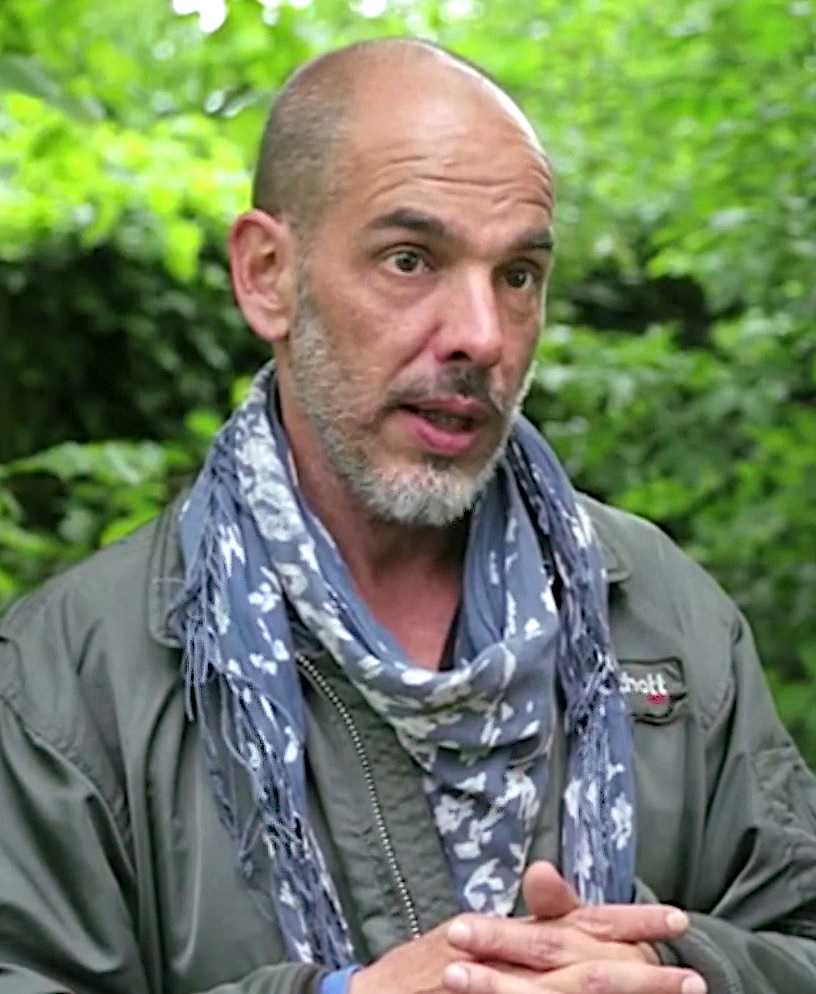
- Javier De Frutos 2015
- Born: 15 May 1963 (age 63); Caracas, Venezuela
- Occupations: Choreographer; dancer; director; designer
- Years active: 1983–present

Javier De Frutos (born 15 May 1963) is a Spanish-Venezuelan choreographer, director, and former dancer. Originally from Caracas, he made a career in London. He was named by the Evening Standard as one of London's most influential people in 2016. He has received nominations in all of the dance categories at the Olivier Awards, including a win for Best Theatre Choreography for Cabaret in 2006. His other awards include an Evening Standard Award for The Most Incredible Thing in collaboration with Pet Shop Boys, a Critics' Circle Award for Milagros with Royal New Zealand Ballet and Elsa Canasta with Rambert Dance Company, and a South Bank Show Award for Grass.

== Early life and education ==
Javier De Frutos was born in Caracas, Venezuela, on 15 May 1963. His father was Spanish. His early studies included architecture and photography, and he developed an interest in the visual arts and theatre. He was inspired to explore dance as a theatrical career after seeing the New York production of the play Cloud Nine directed by Tommy Tune, who was also a noted choreographer. De Frutos began his dance training in Caracas and made his debut there with Danza-Teatro de Abelardo Gameche in 1983. He also studied at the London School of Contemporary Dance and in New York at the Merce Cunningham studio as well as with Sara Rudner.

== Career ==
De Frutos was a member of the Laura Dean Dancers in New York from 1989 to 1992. In 1990, he choreographed his first solo work, D, a new take on The Dying Swan, and in 1992 he performed a solo called Consecration set to The Rite of Spring. He relocated to London in 1994 and started his own dance company. His solo piece The Palace Does Not Forgive (1994) was also set to The Rite of Spring and featured nudity, as did a number of his works from that period.

In 1996, the Ricochet Dance Company performed a piece by De Frutos—E Muoio Disperato (And I Die in Despair) set to Act 3 of Tosca—at the dance festival in Bagnolet, Seine-Saint-Denis, France, earning him a Prix d'Auteur. De Frutos' breakthrough work Grass, a trio set to extracts from Madam Butterfly, won a South Bank Show Award in 1997. A 1999 South Bank Show special on his work was nominated for a Royal Television Society Programme Award. In 2000, De Frutos won a two-year fellowship from the Arts Council of England to study the works of Tennessee Williams, who continued to be source of inspiration for him.

De Frutos stopped dancing professionally at age 39 and continued his work as a choreographer. Elsa Canasta, with the music of Cole Porter, was premiered by the Rambert Dance Company in 2003. De Frutos was nominated for an Olivier Award for Outstanding Achievement in Dance for the work. He won the award for Best Modern Choreography at the Critics' Circle National Dance Awards for both Elsa Canasta and Milagros, a work he created for the Royal New Zealand Ballet using a piano roll recording of The Rite of Spring. Milagros was also nominated for an Olivier Award for Best New Dance Production.

In 2006, De Frutos was appointed as the Artistic Director at the Phoenix Dance Theatre in Leeds in Northern England. His original works for the company, Los Picadores and Paseillo, earned a nomination for Best Modern Choreography at the 2007 Critics' Circle National Dance Awards. The two works were performed at the Venice Dance Biennale in 2007, along with Nopalitos, a piece inspired by the Day of the Dead. He also revived two works by Mexican-American choreographer José Limón: Chaconne (1942), a solo to the Bach piece, and The Moor's Pavane (1949). Despite these successes, tensions behind the scenes led to his acrimonious departure from the company in 2008.

De Frutos has choreographed a number of musicals. In 2006, he worked on Carousel at the Chichester Festival Theatre, and he won the Olivier Award for Best Theatre Choreographer for the West End revival of Cabaret. He received his second nomination in the category for choreographing the original production of London Road in 2011, and he won the 2017 Chita Rivera Award for Outstanding Choreography in a Feature Film for the screen adaptation. From Here to Eternity, the Tim Rice musical which he premiered on the West End in 2013, was nominated for the WhatsOnStage Award for Best Choreography.

For a tribute to ballet impresario Sergei Diaghilev at Sadler's Wells in 2009, De Frutos created Eternal Damnation to Sancho and Sanchez. The piece, which included pregnant nuns and a lecherous pope, received boos and walkouts from the audience, and it was described as "barkingly offensive" with "rampant vulgarity" by a critic for the Financial Times. The BBC reneged on broadcasting the programme, which was scheduled to air in a pre-watershed time slot at Christmastime on BBC 4. The experience adversely affected his mental health and work prospects during the following year.

De Frutos returned to Sadler's Wells in 2011, choreographing a three-act ballet, The Most Incredible Thing, with music by Pet Shop Boys. They won the Beyond Theatre Award, for innovative and genre-crossing productions, at the 2011 Evening Standard Theatre Awards. This time, a recording of the ballet was broadcast in prime time on BBC 4. De Frutos oversaw the US premiere of The Most Incredible Thing with the Charlotte Ballet in North Carolina in 2018, and he was invited to be an artist-in-residence at the McColl Center for Art and Innovation in Charlotte.

In 2013, De Frutos worked again with the Royal New Zealand Ballet, creating Anatomy of a Passing Cloud for their 60th anniversary. It was nominated for both an Olivier Award and a National Dance Award. He created two works for the all-male dance company BalletBoyz: Fiction (2016) was danced to his own fake obituary, read by actor Jim Carter; The Title Is in the Text (2017) was performed on a seesaw to fit the theme of balance. He was commissioned by the Royal Ballet to stage a production of Les Enfants terribles, a danced chamber opera by Philip Glass based on the novel by Jean Cocteau, in 2017.

During the COVID-19 pandemic, De Frutos began to make dance films. The Burning Building (2021), loosely based on the Tennessee Williams play Out Cry, features two dancers stuck in a loop in a circle of light. In Whoever You Are (2022), two dancers in an old house enact Walt Whitman's poem "Whoever You Are Holding Me Now in Hand", while in The Sequestered Disc (2023) the same pair undergo an uncomfortable interview.

In 2023, De Frutos' work 98 Días was premiered at the Venice Dance Biennale by the Cuban dance company, Acosta Danza. The piece was inspired by the 98 days spent in Cuba by the poet Federico García Lorca.

== Awards and nominations ==
Year	Nominated work	Category	Award	Result	Notes	Ref.
1996	E Muoio Disperato		Prix d'Auteur du Conseil Général de la Seine-Saint-Denis	Won	Ricochet Dance Company	
1997	Grass		South Bank Show Award	Won	The Place, London	
2004	Elsa Canasta; Milagros	Best Modern Choreography	Critics' Circle National Dance Award	Won	Rambert Dance Company; Royal New Zealand Ballet	
2004	Elsa Canasta	Outstanding Achievement in Dance	Olivier Award	Nominated	Rambert Dance Company	
2004	Sour Milk		Time Out Live Award	Won	Candoco Dance Company	
2005	Milagros	Best New Dance Production	Olivier Award	Nominated	Royal New Zealand Ballet	
2007	Los Picadores; Paseillo	Best Modern Choreography	Critics' Circle National Dance Award	Nominated	Phoenix Dance Theatre	
2007	Cabaret	Best Theatre Choreographer	Olivier Award	Won	Lyric Theatre, London	
2011	The Most Incredible Thing	Beyond Theatre Award	Evening Standard Award	Won	with Pet Shop Boys; Sadler's Wells Theatre	
2012	London Road	Best Theatre Choreographer	Olivier Award	Nominated	Royal National Theatre	
2012	Inside My Love	Best Choreography in a Video	UK Music Video Award	Nominated	Delilah (mus.); Jake Nava (dir.)	
2014	From Here to Eternity	Best Choreography	WhatsOnStage Award	Nominated	Shaftesbury Theatre	
2016	Anatomy of a Passing Cloud	Outstanding Achievement in Dance	Olivier Award	Nominated	Royal New Zealand Ballet	
2016	Anatomy of a Passing Cloud	Best Modern Choreography	Critics' Circle National Dance Award	Nominated	Royal New Zealand Ballet	
2017	London Road	Outstanding Choreography in a Feature Film	Chita Rivera Award	Won		
2023	Whoever You Are	Best Short Dance Film	Critics' Circle National Dance Award	Won		
2024	The Sequestered Disc	Best Dance Film	Critics' Circle National Dance Award	Nominated		
