= Ivan Putrov =

Ukrainian-born ballet dancer and producer

Ivan Oleksandrovych Putrov (Ukrainian: Іван Олександрович Путров; born 8 March 1980) is a Ukrainian-born ballet dancer and producer. He trained at The Kyiv State Choreographic Institute and at The Royal Ballet School. Upon graduation Sir Anthony Dowell invited him to join the Royal Ballet, which he did in September 1998. He has continued to dance with companies around the world, to organize dance events and to teach.

== Biography ==
Putrov was born in Kyiv to parents who were both ballet dancers from the Ukrainian National Opera and Ballet Theatre, Natalia Berezina-Putrova and Oleksandr Putrov. He later talked of a "childhood [...] spent in the theatre. I thought everyone danced!" He managed to see Bruce Lee films and, his ambition was to do karate; his mother promised him that would be able to lift his legs really high if he took ballet lessons. He appeared on stage for the first time at the age of 10 in the ballet The Forest Song.

Educated at the Kyiv Ballet School, at the age of 15 Ivan Putrov won the Prix de Lausanne competition (1996), where the then Royal Ballet School director Merle Park was a judge. Putrov spent 18 months at the Royal Ballet School and on graduation in 1998 was invited by the Royal Ballet's director, Anthony Dowell, to join the company itself. He was offered a principal's contract with the Kyiv Ballet, but turned it down and decided to join the Royal Ballet, as an artist; he began to dance roles such as the Nutcracker prince, the Boy with the Matted Hair in Shadowplay and Benvolio in Romeo and Juliet. Having taken part in Royal Ballet School performances at Covent Garden in 1998 and 1999, in 1999-2000 he took roles in The Nutcracker, Les Rendezvous, Masquerade and Siren Song. He danced many performances as the Nephew in Peter Wright's production of The Nutcracker and added roles in Romeo and Juliet, The Concert, and Giselle (Albrecht).

He was coached by Dowell for his debut as Beliaev in A Month in the Country in 2001 and also added Basilio in Don Quixote to his repertoire. In 2002 he danced in Onegin (Lensky) and La Bayadère (The Golden Idol), as well as ballets such as The Vertiginous Thrill of Exactitude, Por Vos Muero, and The Leaves are Fading. He became a principal with The Royal Ballet in 2002. Putrov won the National Dance Award for Outstanding Young Male Artist (Classical) the same year. The following year Putrov danced in Coppélia, Mayerling, Swan Lake and Scènes de ballet. His debut as Le Spectre de la Rose at the Royal Opera House was in May 2004 (which he also portrayed, as Nijinsky, in the 2006 film Riot at the Rite).

In Sam Taylor-Wood's 2004 film installation "Strings", Putrov danced suspended by a harness above four musicians playing the slow movement from Tchaikovsky's Second String Quartet, filmed in the Crush Bar of the Royal Opera House. He also appeared (as the artist) in the film installation The Butcher's Shop, commissioned by Kimbell Art Museum, in which Philip Haas recreated the 1582 Annibale Carracci painting of the same name, first seen in 2008 at the Sonnabend Gallery of New York.

In 2004-2005 he danced in Cinderella, La Fille mal gardée (Colas), Rhapsody, Symphonic Variations and Symphony in C. In March 2005 he came on stage from the audience to dance the solos in Rhapsody after Carlos Acosta suffered a twisted ankle. In 2006 Putrov himself suffered an injury in an onstage fall, which led to a lengthy leave from dancing. He returned to the stage without apparent lasting effects, and received notices for roles such as Prince Siegfried in Swan Lake and Lensky in John Cranko's Onegin, for which The Guardian praised his "captivating blitheness." He danced Beliaev alongside Alexandra Ansanelli's Natalia Petrovna in A Month in the Country in her final appearances before retirement, in New York and Havana, and gave his own last performance with the Royal Ballet in May 2010 as the Prince in Ashton's Cinderella.

He created the role of Karl in The Most Incredible Thing at Sadler's Wells Theatre in 2011, and was also credited in the early development of the work. In 2012 Putrov choreographed his first major creation for the stage entitled Ithaca, using La Péri by Paul Dukas.

Putrov has appeared with national ballet companies in Hungary, Lithuania and Ukraine, and appeared at the Vienna Staatsoper. In 2017 he listed as mentors his mother, Irek Mukhamedov and German Zamuel of the Royal Ballet School.

Since leaving the Royal Ballet, Putrov has planned the 'Men in Motion' ballet programmes, which were originally mounted in London and have since toured to Warsaw, Moscow, Łodz and Milan. A 10th-anniversary programme of 'Men in Motion' was produced by Putrov at the London Coliseum in November 2022; Putrov danced Ashton's Dance of the Blessed Spirits. In January 2014 he closed an edition of the BBC2 current affairs programme Newsnight by dancing a solo to a song by Johnny Cash from Affi by Marco Goecke. In 2019 Putrov produced a programme 'Against the Stream' designed as "a tribute to remarkable choreographers who changed the ecology of dance beyond recognition"; he also danced in the Ashton and Macmillan works performed. He was one of the main drivers behind the first performance in Ukraine, by the National Opera of Ukraine, of the Ashton version of La fille mal gardee in June 2025.

He has danced the roles of the swan and the prince in the Matthew Bourne version of Swan Lake.

On film and DVD, Putrov has featured in The Nutcracker (The Nutcracker/Hans-Peter) and as a lead dancer in Scènes de ballet (Ashton) and danced Le Spectre de la rose in the 2006 BBC film Riot at the Rite.
