= Rhapsody (Ashton) =

1980 ballet by Frederick Ashton

- Choreographer: Frederick Ashton
- Music: Sergei Rachmaninoff
- Premiere: 4 August 1980; Royal Opera House
- Original ballet company: The Royal Ballet
- Design: William Chappell; Frederick Ashton
- Created for: Lesley Collier; Mikhail Baryshnikov
- Genre: Neoclassical ballet

Rhapsody is a one-act ballet choreographed by Frederick Ashton to Rachmaninoff's Rhapsody on a Theme of Paganini. The ballet was made for both Queen Elizabeth the Queen Mother's 80th birthday, and Mikhail Baryshnikov's guest appearance with the Royal Ballet. It premiered on 4 August 1980, at the Royal Opera House, with the two principal roles danced by Baryshnikov and Lesley Collier. The ballet is dedicated to the Queen Mother.

== Choreography ==
Ashton had stated that his inspiration was "not just from the nineteenth-century classics, but from classicism." He added, "I've worked to develop my classicism so as to enrich and fit in with the repertory of a classical company." The ballet is danced by a principal couple and a corps de ballet of six men and six women. The lead male role resembles the virtuosic Russian ballet style. Some critics interpret this role as the embodiment of the violin. The female principal role is in the British ballet style. She only enters the stage half-way through the ballet. The contrast becomes less obvious when the principal male role is danced by Royal Ballet-trained dancers. The two mostly dance separately, but the moments when they are together have been compared to Fred Astaire and Ginger Rogers. While the two leads are the main focus of the ballet, the ensemble also has its own dances.

== Production ==
Ashton first choreographed to Rhapsody on a Theme of Paganini for Vincente Minnelli and Gottfried Reinhardt's 1953 film The Story of Three Loves. The dance was featured in the story "The Jealous Lover." The scene features the character portrayed by Moira Shearer, dancing what she "supposedly improvised," before the corps de ballet joins her. Ashton had stated that he "hates" the set-up. However, he was still interested in the music years later.

Ashton finally choreographed to the same score again in 1980. According to him, Princess Margaret approached him about "doing something" for the 80th birthday of Queen Elizabeth the Queen Mother, with whom Ashton was friendly. Coincidentally, Mikhail Baryshnikov was invited to make guest appearances at the Royal Ballet in July and August 1980. However, he did not want to dance classical ballets, and would only perform with the company if Ashton would choreograph a new ballet for him. Ashton had already wanted to create a ballet for Baryshnikov in 1977, after the latter's performance as Colas in the former's La fille mal gardée with the Royal Ballet. Ashton said, "with a gun held at my head and the Queen Mother's birthday, I pulled out the plugs," and decided to choreograph to Rhapsody on a Theme of Paganini.

Lesley Collier was cast as the female lead. She said she was not sure why she was chosen as she believed she was "not an inspiring dancer." She added, "With me [Ashton] has to work and work to find something – he has to start completely from scratch." However, she also said that her speed might be why she was cast. Six men and six women, all younger members of the company, were chosen as the corps de ballet. Rhapsody was Ashton's first ballet in many years without the involvement of Michael Somes, instead, Christopher Newton was chosen as the répétiteur, a decision with which Somes disagreed.

Ashton began choreographing Rhapsody in May 1980. Baryshnikov, however, was only able to arrive in June. Ashton therefore could not work on the ballet chronologically, as he would have preferred. Since he usually mapped out the structures of his works, he was able to work around Baryshnikov. The actual steps were determined once Ashton started working with the dancers, as he wanted "the feeling of spontaneity to the movement". However, Collier had a knee injury, so Ashton had to work around her too. By the time Baryshnikov arrived, the ballet had been outlined. Baryshnikov had a small injury that delayed production for a few days. The choreography of the ballet was completed in late July.

Baryshnikov had hoped that by dancing with the Royal Ballet, he would learn the British ballet style. However, Ashton had him dance in the Russian style, for which Baryshnikov was "a bit disappointed," as he "was trying to escape all those steps." Ashton told him that if he disliked the steps, they could be tweaked, though Baryshnikov did not request any changes to the choreography. Recalling working with Ashton, Collier said, "[Ashton] does not tell you what's on his mind... he lets it remain a mystery and it's better that way, because then it can change." However, Ashton did tell her about the past dancers who inspired her role, which was "his way of giving you his vision." On working with Baryshnikov, Ashton said, "Baryshnikov contributes so much. He's a marvellous dancer, of course. He rings some of his sensational steps and I modify them or develop them to suit the moment. One works with the material they present."

The original set was devised by Ashton, inspired by 18th-century arches. William Chappell, an old friend of Ashton, designed the costumes, though he disagreed with Ashton's feedback so much that they "were practically passing notes to each other by the end." In 1995, the original costumes and sets were replaced by new ones by Patrick Caulfield. They were redesigned in 2005, this time by Jessica Curtis. In 2016, the costumes and sets were reverted to the original designs.

Rhapsody is "by gracious permission" dedicated to the Queen Mother.

== Original cast ==
- Lesley Collier
- Mikhail Baryshnikov
- Bryony Brind
- Angela Cox
- Gillian Kingsley
- Karen Paisey
- Genesia Rosato
- Gail Taphouse
- Michael Batchelor
- Stephen Beagley
- Antony Dowson
- Ross MacGibbon
- Ashley Page
- Andrew Ward

== Performances ==
Rhapsody premiered on 4 August 1980, during the Queen Mother's birthday gala, at the Royal Opera House. The performance was attended by the Queen and the Queen Mother.

In 1996, the Paris Opera Ballet debuted Rhapsody. Sarasota Ballet and K-ballet had also performed the ballet.

== Reception ==
Writing for the Dancing Times, David Vaughan wrote that Rhapsody "is no mere gala party piece." He added that the ballet "is in the same lineage in the Ashton canon as Les Rendezvous, Symphonic Variations, Scenes de Ballet," as well as Monotones and Birthday Offering. Arlene Croce of The New Yorker criticised the work: "Although the expansive material suits the melodramatic Rachmaninoff score, it effectively separates Baryshnikov from the rest of the cast and from the Royal Ballet style." She also wrote that "Baryshnikov doesn't look fresh in Rhapsody. Ashton has indulged an image of him which he has outgrown."
